= Line A1 (Athens Suburban Railway) =

Rapid transit line in Athens, Greece

Line A1 (Piraeus–Airport)
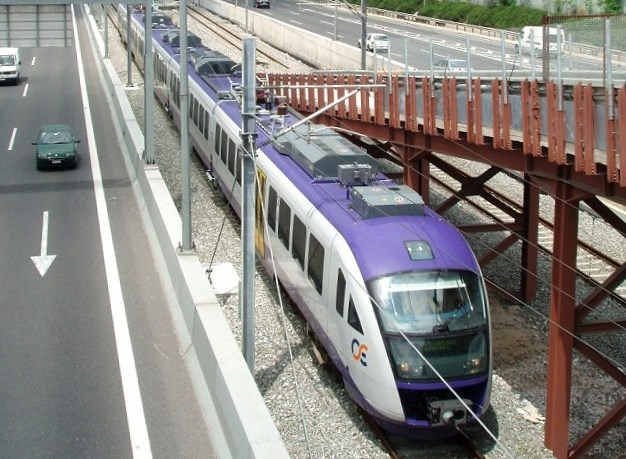
- An OSE class 460 train in the median strip of Attiki Odos, bound for Athens Airport.

Overview
- Service type: Commuter rail
- Status: Operating
- Locale: Attica, Greece
- First service: 30 July 2004 – 6 July 2008 (first iteration) 30 July 2017; 9 years ago
- Current operator: Hellenic Train
- Former operator: TrainOSE (2004–2022)
- Website: www.hellenictrain.gr

Route
- Termini: Piraeus; Athens Airport
- Stops: 19
- Distance travelled: 48.2 km (30.0 mi)
- Average journey time: 1 hour and 5 minutes
- Service frequency: Mon–Fri: 21 pairs per day Sat–Sun: 20 pairs per day
- Lines used: Piraeus–Platy; Athens Airport–Patras

Technical
- Rolling stock: OSE class 460 (EMU)
- Track gauge: 1,435 mm (4 ft 8 1/2 in) standard gauge
- Operating speed: 120 km/h (75 mph) (maximum)
- Track owners: Greek Railways (tracks); GAIAOSE (stations)

Line A1 is an Athens Suburban Railway (Proastiakos) line in Athens, Greece, managed by Hellenic Train. The service connects Piraeus with the Airport. The line shares a part of its course with lines A2 and A4 as well as Metro line 3, but also with line A3 at Athens. Its earlier iteration was the first suburban line, inaugurated on 30 July 2004, using Class 560 DMUs between Larissa Station (now Athens) and the Airport. With the completion of the electrification of the sections of the line to Athens in 2017 and Piraeus in 2018, the service was reinstated, using Class 460 EMUs rolling stock.

== History ==
The initial planning phase of the service provided for the use of express trains (Airport Express) from Piraeus to the Airport with intermediate stations only in Athens, Agioi Anargyroi, Neratziotissa, Kifissias and Doukissis Plakentias, and with a journey time of half an hour. In the end, however, the need to connect the capital's international airport with the city's central metro hub, Syntagma, imposed the joint travel of Suburban and Metro from Doukissis Plakentias to the Airport.

The first section of what is now Line A1 opened on 30 July 2004. The standard gauge service ran from Athens to the Airport, using Class 560 diesel multiple units. Electric train services using Class 460 electric multiple units were introduced between Neratziotissa and the Airport in 2006. On 4 June 2007, diesel services were extended south from Athens to Piraeus, after the completion of construction on the alignment of the former metre-gauge Piraeus–Patras railway that closed in August 2005.

Direct suburban railway services from Piraeus and Athens to the Airport were suspended on 6 July 2008, forcing passengers to change at Ano Liosia and (until 14 February 2009) Neratziotissa. Direct services were later restored with the completion of electrification works on the Piraeus–Platy railway from Agioi Anargyroi to Athens on 30 July 2017, and then to Piraeus on 1 February 2018.

== Route ==
Line A1 follows the Piraeus–Platy railway from Piraeus to Kato Acharnes, before curving east into the Athens Airport–Patras railway, bypassing the Acharnes Railway Center. The route then follows the Airport–Patras railway, along the median strip of the A6 motorway (Attiki Odos), from Metamorfosi to Athens Airport.

As of September 2026, there are 20 pairs of trains per day, with a frequency of one train every two hours. (Note: For the first three airport-bound and last two Piraeus-bound services, the western terminus is Tavros.) On weekdays, there is an extra pair of trains, with an extra airport-bound train during the early morning, and an extra Piraeus-bound train during the late evening, both of which begin/terminate at Tavros.

Lines A2 and Athens Metro Line 3 shares the route from the Airport up to Metamorfosi and Pallini respectively. However, most Metro Line 3 trains start or terminate at Doukissis Plakentias, with a through service to the Airport leaving once every 36 minutes.

=== Map ===
The route of Line A1

== Stations ==
The spelling of the station names on this table, in English and Greek, are according to the signage.

†	Terminal station
#	Interchange station

Station English	Station Greek	Regional unit	Opened	Interchanges and notes	Position
Piraeus ^{†#}	Πειραιάς	Piraeus	30 June 1884 rebuilt 2007	Start of common section with Line A4. Interchange with Athens Metro Line 3.	37.949095°N 23.643430°E
Lefka	Λεύκα	Piraeus	30 June 1884 rebuilt 2007		37.955375°N 23.653910°E
Rentis	Ρέντης	Piraeus	30 June 1884 rebuilt 2007		37.962320°N 23.668540°E
Tauros	Ταύρος	South Athens	1 October 2014	Opened as an infill station.	37.968745°N 23.693320°E
Rouf	Ρουφ	Central Athens; South Athens	30 June 1884 rebuilt 2007		37.973735°N 23.704055°E
Athina ^{#}	Αθήνα	Central Athens	8 March 1904	Interchange with intercity services, Line A3 to Chalcis, and Athens Metro Line 2 at Larissa Station.	37.992365°N 23.720215°E
Agioi Anargyroi ^{#}	Άγιοι Ανάργυροι	West Athens	8 August 2010	Interchange with Line A3 to Chalcis. Opened as an infill station.	38.021770°N 23.718380°E
Pyrgos Vasilissis	Πύργος Βασιλίσσης	West Athens	27 February 2014	Opened as an infill station.	38.039610°N 23.727395°E
Kato Acharnai ^{#}	Κάτω Αχαρναί	East Attica	27 February 2014	End of common section with Line A4. Opened as an infill station.	38.054065°N 23.732580°E
Metamorfosi ^{#}	Μεταμόρφωση	North Athens	8 August 2010	Start of common section with Line A2. Opened as an infill station.	38.060135°N 23.755730°E
Iraklio	Ηράκλειο	North Athens	30 July 2004		38.057155°N 23.771350°E
Neratziotissa (Note: Neratziotissa is signed as "Nerantziotissa" (Greek: Nerantziotissa) on the Athens Metro.) ^{#}	Νερατζιώτισσα	North Athens	6 August 2004	Interchange with Athens Metro Line 1. Opened as an infill station.	38.045120°N 23.792945°E
Kifisias	Κηφισίας	North Athens	30 July 2004		38.042100°N 23.803465°E
Pentelis	Πεντέλης	North Athens	21 February 2007	Opened as an infill station.	38.033460°N 23.821965°E
Plakentias (Note: Plakentias is signed as "Doukissis Plakentias" (Greek: Δουκίσσης Πλακεντίας) on the Athens Metro.) ^{#}	Πλακεντίας	North Athens	30 July 2004	Start of common section with Athens Metro Line 3.	38.024720°N 23.833910°E
Pallini	Παλλήνη	East Attica	30 July 2004		38.005100°N 23.869825°E
Paiania–Kantza	Παιανία - Κάντζα	East Attica	30 July 2004		37.984485°N 23.870020°E
Koropi	Κορωπί	East Attica	30 July 2004		37.912860°N 23.895860°E
Athens International Airport ^{†}	Διεθνής Αερολιμένας Αθηνών	East Attica	30 July 2004	End of common section with Line A2 and Athens Metro Line 3. This station is operated by Athens International Airport S.A.	37.936890°N 23.944700°E

== See also ==
- Hellenic Railways Organisation
- Hellenic Train
- Proastiakos
