= Line A2 (Athens Suburban Railway) =

Rapid transit line in Athens, Greece

Line A2 (Ano Liosia–Airport)
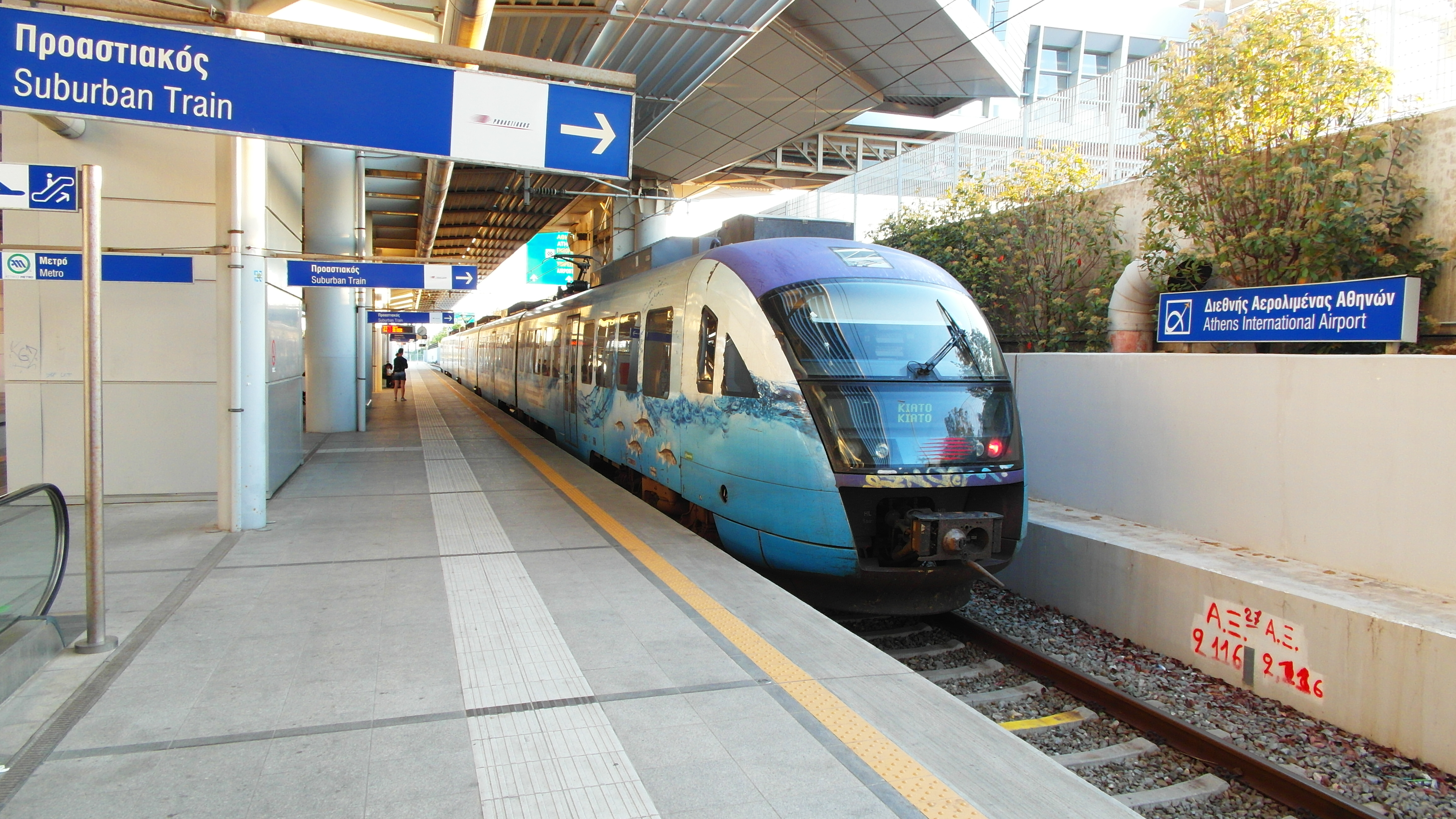
- A OSE class 460 train awaiting departure at Athens Airport.

Overview
- Service type: Commuter rail
- Status: Operating
- Locale: Greece (Attica)
- First service: 30 July 2017; 9 years ago
- Current operator: Hellenic Train
- Former operator: TrainOSE (2017–2022)
- Website: www.hellenictrain.gr

Route
- Termini: Ano Liosia; Athens Airport
- Stops: 12
- Distance travelled: 33.18 km (20.62 mi)
- Average journey time: 34 minutes
- Service frequency: Mon–Fri: 32 pairs per day Sat–Sun: 18 pairs per day
- Line used: Athens Airport–Patras

Technical
- Rolling stock: OSE class 460 (EMU)
- Track gauge: 1,435 mm (4 ft 8 1/2 in) standard gauge
- Operating speed: 120 km/h (75 mph) (maximum)
- Track owners: Greek Railways (tracks); GAIAOSE (stations)

Line A2 is an Athens Suburban Railway (Proastiakos) service in northern Athens and East Attica, managed by Hellenic Train. The service runs between Ano Liosia and Athens International Airport, reinforcing Line A1 along the median strip of the A6 motorway: it also runs concurrently in part with lines A4 and Metro Line 3, and has an interchange with Line A3 at Acharnes Railway Center (SKA).

Although Suburban Railway services through the Athens Airport–Patras axis of SKA started in September 2005, the service in its current form began on 30 July 2017, using OSE class 460 EMUs rolling stock.

== History ==
Line A2 is a remnant of a standard gauge Athens Suburban Railway service that ran between Athens Airport and Kiato, via the Athens Airport–Patras axis of Acharnes Railway Center (SKA). The first section of the service, between the Airport and Corinth and using Class 560 diesel multiple units, began on 27 September 2005: the western extension to Kiato followed on 9 July 2007. Ano Liosia, the current western terminus of Line A2, opened on 18 July 2006.

From 6 July 2008 to 12 December 2010, the service was reduced to running between Ano Liosia and Neratziotissa due to electrification works, although it was extended back east to Athens Airport on 14 February 2009, henceforth being served with Class 460 electric multiple units.

The current service that reinforces what is now Line A1 was introduced on 30 July 2017, following the introduction of a new Suburban Railway network after the extension of electrification to Athens railway station and (from 2018) Piraeus: the service was then extended west to Ano Liosia on 24 February 2018.

== Route ==
Line A2 runs between Ano Liosia and Athens Airport, along the median strip of the A6 and A64 motorways. Since 22 November 2025, there are 32 trains per day on weekdays, and 18 trains per day on weekends and public holidays, resulting in a frequency of two trains and one train per hour respectively.

Line A2 acts as a feeder service in order to reinforce services along parts of Line A1 and Athens Metro Line 3, from the Airport up to Metamorfosi and Pallini respectively. However, most Metro Line 3 trains start or terminate at Doukissis Plakentias (an interchange with Lines A1 and A2 at Plakentias) with a through service to the Airport leaving Piraeus once every 36 minutes.

=== Map ===
The route of Line A2

== Stations ==
The spelling of the station names on this table, in English and Greek, are according to the signage.

†	Terminal station
#	Interchange station

Station English	Station Greek	Regional unit	Opened	Interchanges and notes	Position
Ano Liosia ^{†#}	Άνω Λιόσια	West Attica	18 July 2006	Interchange with Line A4. Opened as infill station.	38.070695°N 23.710135°E
Line A2 does not stop at Zefyri.
Acharnes Railway Center ^{#}	Σιδηροδρομικό Κέντρο Αχαρνών	East Attica	5 April 2011	Interchange with Line A3, and Hellenic Train. Opened as infill station.	38.065735°N 23.737165°E
Metamorfosi ^{#}	Μεταμόρφωση	North Athens	8 August 2010	Start of common section with Line A1. Opened as infill station.	38.060135°N 23.755730°E
Iraklio	Ηράκλειο	North Athens	30 July 2004		38.057155°N 23.771350°E
Neratziotissa (Note: Nerantziotissa is signed as "Nerantziotissa" (Greek: Nerantziotissa) on the Athens Metro.) ^{#}	Νερατζιώτισσα	North Athens	6 August 2004	Interchange with Athens Metro Line 1.	38.045120°N 23.792945°E
Kifisias	Κηφισίας	North Athens	30 July 2004		38.042100°N 23.803465°E
Pentelis	Πεντέλης	North Athens	21 February 2007	Opened as infill station.	38.033460°N 23.821965°E
Plakentias (Note: Plakentias is signed as "Doukissis Plakentias" (Greek: Δουκίσσης Πλακεντίας) on the Athens Metro.) ^{#}	Πλακεντίας	North Athens	30 July 2004	Start of common section with Athens Metro Line 3.	38.024720°N 23.833910°E
Pallini	Παλλήνη	East Attica	30 July 2004		38.005100°N 23.869825°E
Paiania–Kantza	Παιανία - Κάντζα	East Attica	30 July 2004		37.984485°N 23.870020°E
Koropi	Κορωπί	East Attica	30 July 2004		37.912860°N 23.895860°E
Athens International Airport ^{†}	Διεθνής Αερολιμένας Αθηνών	East Attica	30 July 2004	End of common section with Line A1 and Athens Metro Line 3. This station is operated by Athens International Airport S.A.	37.936890°N 23.944700°E

== See also ==
- Hellenic Railways Organisation
- Hellenic Train
- Proastiakos
