= Neratziotissa station =

Athens Suburban Railway and Athens Metro station

Νερατζιώτισσα Neratziotissa Νεραντζιώτισσα Nerantziotissa
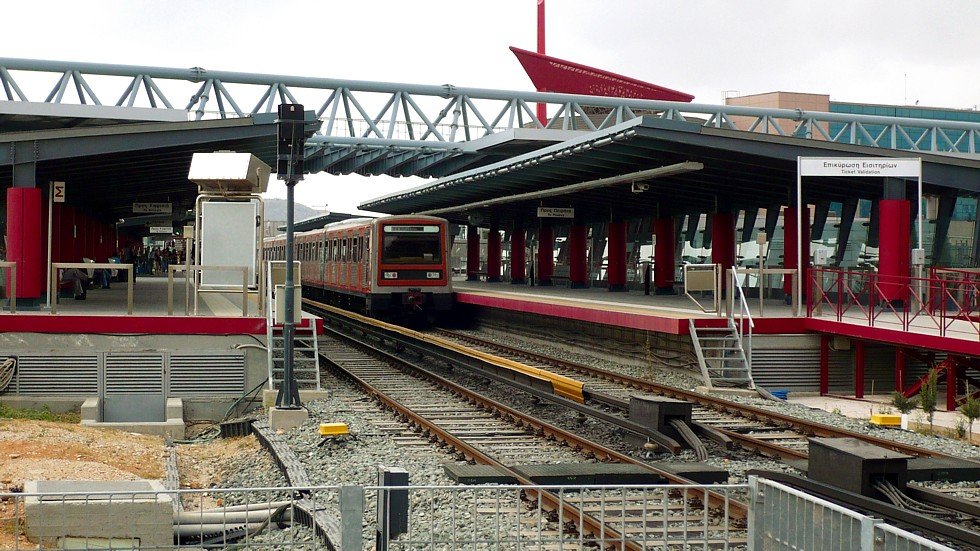
- Line 1 station

General information
- Other names: Nerantziotissa
- Location: 151 22 Marousi; Greece
- Coordinates: 38.045120°N 23.792945°E
- Owner: GAIAOSE (Suburban Rail); STASY (Metro)
- Operator: Hellenic Train (Suburban Rail); STASY (Metro)
- Lines: Airport–Patras railway
- Platforms: 4
- Tracks: 4

Construction
- Structure type: At-grade (Suburban Rail); Elevated (Metro)
- Platform levels: 2
- Accessible: Yes

Key dates
- 10 August 1957: Line 1 opened
- 30 July 2004: Railway opened
- 6 August 2004: Interchange opened
- 4 June 2007: Railway electrified

Services
Preceding station	Suburban Rail	Following station
Irakleio towards Piraeus	Line A1	Kifisias towards Athens Airport
Irakleio towards Ano Liosia	Line A2	Kifisias towards Athens Airport
Preceding station	Athens Metro	Following station
Eirini towards Piraeus	Line 1	Marousi towards Kifissia
Location

Neratziotissa or Nerantziotissa (Greek: Νερατζιώτισσα or Νεραντζιώτισσα respectively), is a complex of two train stations located in the median strip of the Attiki Odos motorway in Marousi, a northern suburb of Athens, Greece. The first is a station of Line 1 of the Athens Metro, and the second is a Athens Suburban Railway (suburban rail) station. It takes its name from the nearby Byzantine church of Παναγία Νεραντζιώτισσα (Panagía Nerantziótissa), which was itself named for the abundance of bitter orange trees in the area. The station is near The Mall Athens, a large American-style shopping mall. It is also close to the Athens Olympic Sports Complex.

Nerantziotissa station was built for the 2004 Olympic Games, opening on 6 August 2004. It is served by lines 1, 4 and 5 of the Athens Suburban Railway, all of which terminate at Athens Airport.

== Station layout ==
L1
Footbridge
- Entry/Exit
- Shopping centre
G
Side platform
Southbound
← towards Piraeus (Eirini)
Northbound
towards Kifissia (Marousi) →
Side platform
Concourse
- Customer service
- Tickets
- Entry/Exit
B1

← A6 towards Elefsina
Platform 2
← towards Piraeus / towards Ano Liosia (Irakleio)
Island platform
Platform 1
towards Athens Airport (Kifisias) →

A6 towards Markopoulo →

== Services ==
Since 22 November 2025, the following services call at this station:

- Athens Suburban Railway Line A1 between Piraeus and Athens Airport, with up to one train per hour;
- Athens Suburban Railway Line A2 between Ano Liosia and Athens Airport, with up to two trains per hour on weekdays, and up to one train per hour on weekends and public holidays;
- Athens Metro Line 1 between Piraeus and Kifissia.

The Metro and Suburban Railway platforms are separated by ticket barriers.

== See also ==
- Athens Metro
- Athens Suburban Railway
