= Kifisias railway station =

Athens Suburban Railway station

Κηφισίας Kifisias
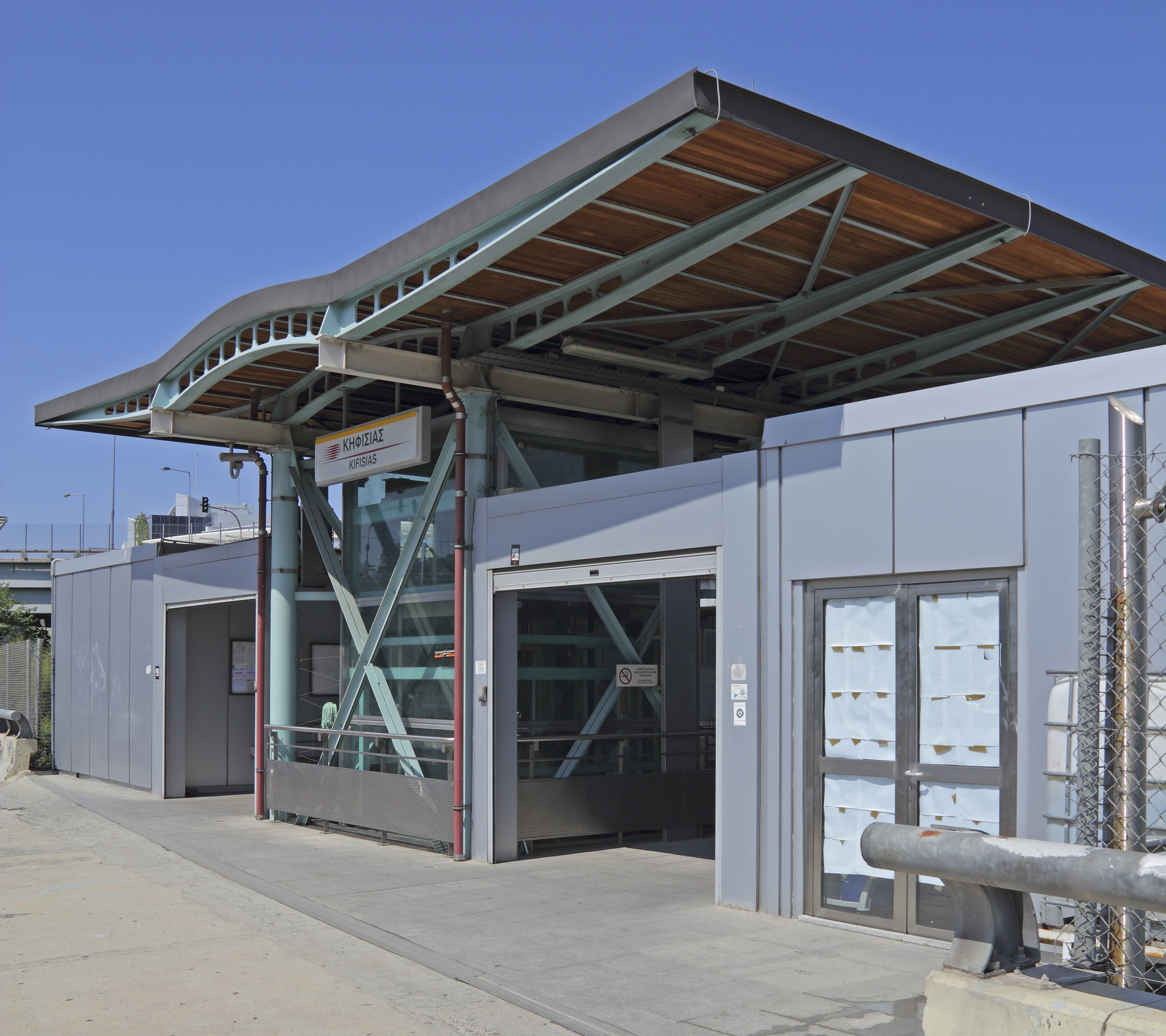
- Kifissias railway station, July 2013

General information
- Location: Kifisias Avenue; Marousi 151 25, North Athens
- Coordinates: 38°2′31″N 23°48′12″E
- Owner: GAIAOSE
- Operator: Hellenic Train
- Line: Airport–Patras railway
- Platforms: 2
- Tracks: 3

Construction
- Platform levels: 2
- Parking: No
- Cycle facilities: No
- Accessible: Yes

Other information
- Status: Staffed

Key dates
- 30 July 2004: Opened
- 4 June 2007: Electrified

Services
| Preceding station | Suburban Rail | Following station |
|---|---|---|
| Neratziotissa towards Piraeus | Line A1 | Pentelis towards Athens Airport |
| Neratziotissa towards Ano Liosia | Line A2 | Pentelis towards Athens Airport |
Location

Kifisias railway station (Greek: Σιδηροδρομικός Σταθμός Κηφισίας, romanized: Sidirodromikós Stathmós Kifisías) is a station located on Kifisias Avenue in Marousi, a municipality of the regional unit of North Athens, Attica, Greece, located in the median strip of the A6 motorway (Attiki Odos), at the interchange of Kifisias Avenue, from which the station is named. It was first opened on 30 July 2004, along with the first section of the Athens Airport–Patras railway. The station consists of an island platform and a train storage line. In the future, it will meet with Metro Line 4, through Paradise Station, which is planned to open after 2035.

The station should not be confused with the metro station of Line 1, which lies further north in the suburb of Kifisia.

== History ==
The station opened on 30 July 2004, along with the first section of the Athens Airport–Patras railway. In 2009, with the Greek debt crisis unfolding OSE's Management was forced to reduce services across the network. Timetables were cut back, and routes closed as the government-run entity attempted to reduce overheads. Services from Athens Airport & Athens were cut back, with some ticket offices closing, reducing the reliability of services and passenger numbers. In 2017 OSE's passenger transport sector was privatised as TrainOSE, currently, a wholly owned subsidiary of Ferrovie dello Stato Italiane infrastructure, including stations, remained under the control of OSE.

The station is owned by GAIAOSE, which since 3 October 2001 owns most railway stations in Greece: the company was also in charge of rolling stock from December 2014 until October 2025, when Greek Railways (the owner of the Airport–Patras railway) took over that responsibility.

== Facilities ==
The station has a ticket office and cafe (since closed). At platform level, the station is equipped with Dot-matrix display departure and arrival screens on the platforms for passenger information, seating, and information boards, with access to the platforms via life or escalator. Outside the station, there is a limited number of parking spaces for railway users.

== Services ==
Since 22 November 2025, the following services call at this station:

- Athens Suburban Railway Line A1 between Piraeus and Athens Airport, with up to one train per hour;
- Athens Suburban Railway Line A2 between Ano Liosia and Athens Airport, with up to two trains per hour on weekdays, and up to one train per hour on weekends and public holidays.

== Future ==
The Athens Metro Development Plan of October 2022 currently proposes an interchange from this station with Line 4, at Paradissos.

== Station layout ==
| L Ground/Concourse | Customer service | Tickets/Exits |
| Level; Ε1 | Platform 2 | ← to Piraeus / to Ano Liosia (Nerantziotissa) |
| Level; Ε1 | Island platform, doors will open on the left |
| Level; Ε1 | Platform 1 | → to Athens Airport (Pentelis) → |
