= Irakleio railway station =

Railway station in Athens, Greece

Ηράκλειο Iraklio

General information
- Location: Irakleio, 141 22, North Athens
- Coordinates: 38°03′26″N 23°46′17″E
- Owner: GAIAOSE
- Operator: Hellenic Train
- Line: Airport–Patras railway
- Platforms: 2
- Tracks: 3

Construction
- Platform levels: 2
- Parking: Yes
- Cycle facilities: No
- Accessible: Yes

Other information
- Status: Staffed

History
- Former names: Ano Iraklio

Key dates
- 30 July 2004: Opened
- 14 February 2009: Electrified

Services
Preceding station	Suburban Rail	Following station
Metamorfosi towards Piraeus	Line A1	Neratziotissa towards Athens Airport
Metamorfosi towards Ano Liosia	Line A2	Neratziotissa towards Athens Airport
Location

Irakleio railway station (Greek: Σιδηροδρομικός Σταθμός Ηρακλείου, romanized: Sidirodromikós Stathmós Iraklíou) is a station on the Airport–Patras railway line, located in the municipality of Irakleio, Attica close to the municipalities of Vrilissia, Maroussi, and Chalandri Greece. It was first opened on 30 July 2004 and is located in the median strip of the A6 motorway, at the interchange of Pentelis Avenue, at the intersection of which with the railway line SKA - Athens International Airport has been built. Prior to its construction, it was referred to as "Ano Iraklio" station.

== History ==
The station opened on 30 July 2004. The current station should not be confused with the old Iraklio railway station, on the Piraeus, Athens and Peloponnese Railway, which was located to the south of the current station, or to Irakleio station of the Athens metro, which is located in the old station site. In 2008, all Athens Suburban Railway services were transferred from OSE to TrainOSE. In 2009, with the Greek debt crisis unfolding OSE's Management was forced to reduce services across the network. Timetables were cut back, and routes closed as the government-run entity attempted to reduce overheads. Services from Athens Airport & Athens were cut back, with some ticket offices closing, reducing the reliability of services and passenger numbers. In 2017 OSE's passenger transport sector was privatised as TrainOSE (Now Hellenic Train), currently a wholly owned subsidiary of Ferrovie dello Stato Italiane infrastructure, including stations, remained under the control of OSE. In July 2022, the station began being served by Hellenic Train, the rebranded TranOSE.

The station is owned by GAIAOSE, which since 3 October 2001 owns most railway stations in Greece: the company was also in charge of rolling stock from December 2014 until October 2025, when Greek Railways (the owner of the Airport–Patras railway) took over that responsibility.

== Facilities ==
The station has a ticket office and cafe. At platform level, the station is equipped with Dot-matrix display departure and arrival screens on the platforms for passenger information, seating, and information boards, with access to the platforms via life or escalator. Outside the station is a bus stop where the local 500, 460, 640 & A8 call. Parking is also available at the station.

== Services ==
Since 22 November 2025, the following services call at this station:

- Athens Suburban Railway Line A1 between Piraeus and Athens Airport, with up to one train per hour;
- Athens Suburban Railway Line A2 between Ano Liosia and Athens Airport, with up to two trains per hour on weekdays, and up to one train per hour on weekends and public holidays.

== Station layout ==
L Ground/Concourse	Customer service	Tickets/Exits
Level; Ε1	Platform 2	← to Piraeus / to Ano Liosia (Metamorfosi)
Level; Ε1	Island platform, doors will open on the left
Level; Ε1	Platform 1	→ to Athens Airport (Nerantziotissa) →

== See also ==
- Hellenic Railways Organization
- TrainOSE
- Proastiakos
- P.A.Th.E./P.
