= Pentelis railway station =

Athens Suburban Railway station

Πεντέλης Pentelis
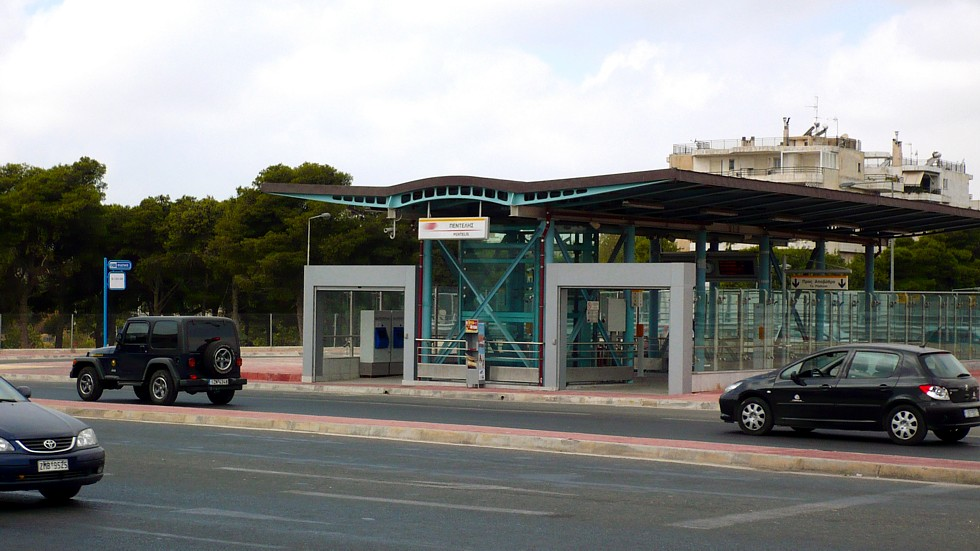

General information
- Location: Pentelis Avenue; Vrilissia 152 34, North Athens
- Coordinates: 38°02′0″N 23°49′19″E
- Owner: GAIAOSE
- Operator: Hellenic Train
- Line: Airport–Patras railway
- Platforms: 2
- Tracks: 3

Construction
- Platform levels: 2
- Parking: Yes
- Cycle facilities: No
- Accessible: Yes

Other information
- Status: Staffed

Key dates
- 30 July 2004: Line opened
- 21 February 2007: Station opened
- 4 June 2007: Line electrified

Services
Preceding station	Suburban Rail	Following station
Kifisias towards Piraeus	Line A1	Doukissis Plakentias towards Athens Airport
Kifisias towards Ano Liosia	Line A2	Doukissis Plakentias towards Athens Airport
Location

Pentelis railway station (Greek: Σιδηροδρομικός Σταθμός Πεντέλης, romanized: Sidirodromikós Stathmós Pentélis) is a station located in the municipality of Vrilissia near the borders of the municipalities of Maroussi and Chalandri Greece. It was first opened on 21 February 2007 and is located in the median strip of the A6 motorway, at the interchange of Pentelis Avenue, at the intersection of which with the railway line SKA - Athens International Airport has been built, from which the station is named. The station consists of an island platform and a train storage line.

== History ==
The station opened on 21 February 2007, by the Greek Minister of Transport and Communications, Michalis Liapis. In 2009, with the Greek debt crisis unfolding OSE's management was forced to reduce services across the network. Timetables were cutback, and routes closed as the government-run entity attempted to reduce overhead. Service from Athens Airport & Athens were cut back, with some ticket offices closing, reducing the reliability of services, and passenger numbers. In 2017 OSE's passenger transport sector was privatised as TrainOSE, currently, a wholly owned subsidiary of Ferrovie dello Stato Italiane infrastructure, including stations, remained under the control of OSE.

The station is owned by GAIAOSE, which since 3 October 2001 owns most railway stations in Greece: the company was also in charge of rolling stock from December 2014 until October 2025, when Greek Railways (the owner of the Airport–Patras railway) took over that responsibility.

== Facilities ==
The station has a ticket office and cafe. At platform level, the station is equipped with Dot-matrix display departure and arrival screens on the platforms for passenger information, seating, and information boards, with access to the platforms via lift or escalator. Outside the station, there is a bus stop where the local 450, 451, 460 & 461 call. Parking is also available at the station.

== Services ==
Since 22 November 2025, the following services call at this station:

- Athens Suburban Railway Line A1 between Piraeus and Athens Airport, with up to one train per hour;
- Athens Suburban Railway Line A2 between Ano Liosia and Athens Airport, with up to two trains per hour on weekdays, and up to one train per hour on weekends and public holidays.

== Station layout ==
L Ground/Concourse	Customer service	Tickets/Exits
Level; Ε1	Platform 2	← to Piraeus / to Ano Liosia (Kifisias)
Level; Ε1	Island platform, doors will open on the left
Level; Ε1	Platform 1	→ to Athens Airport (Doukissis Plakentias) →
