= Zefyri railway station =

Railway station in Athens, Greece

Ζεφύρι Zefyri

General information
- Location: Zefyri 134 51,Athens; West Athens; Greece
- Coordinates: 38°04′11″N 23°43′02″E
- Owner: GAIAOSE
- Operator: Hellenic Train
- Line: Airport–Patras railway
- Platforms: 2
- Tracks: 2

Construction
- Structure type: at-grade
- Platform levels: 1
- Cycle facilities: No
- Accessible: Yes

Other information
- Status: Staffed
- Website: http://www.ose.gr/en/

Key dates
- 6 July 2007: Connection opened
- 30 July 2017: Connection electrified
- 10 May 2018: Station opened

Services
Preceding station	Suburban Rail	Following station
Ano Liosia towards Kiato	Line A4	Kato Acharnes towards Piraeus
Line A2 does not stop here
Location

Zefyri railway station (Greek: Σιδηροδρομικός σταθμός Ζεφυρίου, romanized: Sidirodromikos Stathmos Zefyriou) is a station on the Athens Airport-Patras railway line in Zefyri, a suburb in the north-central part of Athens, Greece. Located inside a tunnel on the islet of Attiki Odos, The station opened on 10 May 2018 and is served by the Athens Suburban Railway.

== History ==
The station was inaugurated on Wednesday 2 August 2017, when the Minister of Infrastructure and Transport Christos Spirtzis opened the station, arriving on a special "ministerial" train. however due to technical issues the station remain closed to passengers for a further nine mouths. The stations operation started at 5:49 AM on 10 May 2018. Constructed by ERGOSE within the existing cutting, as the line open several years prior. Built using the cut & cover metherd, it was an independent technical object of the project: Zefyriou "(Α.Σ. 541/13).

The station is owned by GAIAOSE, which since 3 October 2001 owns most railway stations in Greece: the company was also in charge of rolling stock from December 2014 until October 2025, when Greek Railways (the owner of the Airport–Patras railway) took over that responsibility.

== Facilities ==
The station has a ticket office. At platform level, seating and information boards are available, with access to the platforms via life or escalator. There is a bus stop outside the station where the local 735 calls.

== Services ==
Since 22 November 2025, the following services call at this station:

- Athens Suburban Railway Line A4 between Piraeus and Kiato, with up to one train per hour.

== Station layout ==
P Platforms	Platform 2	→ ← to Kiato (Ano Liosia)
P Platforms	Island platform, doors will open on the left
P Platforms	Platform 1	→ to Piraeus (Kato Acharnes) →
Ground level	Customer service	Exits/Tickets

== Future plans ==
Elliniko Metro plans to make Zefyri station part of the Athens Metro Line 2 extension to Acharnes.

== See also ==
- Railway stations in Greece
- Hellenic Railways Organization
- Hellenic Train
- Proastiakos
