= Lefka railway station =

Railway station in Athens, Greece

Λεύκα Lefka

General information
- Location: Lefka, Piraeus; Piraeus; Greece
- Coordinates: 37°57′21″N 23°39′16″E
- Owner: GAIAOSE
- Operator: Hellenic Train
- Line: Piraeus–Platy railway
- Platforms: 2
- Tracks: 4 (2 through lines)

Construction
- Structure type: at-grade
- Platform levels: 1
- Parking: Yes
- Cycle facilities: No
- Accessible: Yes

Other information
- Status: Unstaffed
- Website: http://www.ose.gr/en/

Key dates
- 30 June 1884: Opened
- 7 August 2005: Closed
- 4 June 2007: Rebuilt
- 1 February 2018: Electrified

Services
Preceding station	Suburban Rail	Following station
Piraeus Terminus	Line A1	Rentis towards Athens Airport
Piraeus Terminus	Line A4	Rentis towards Kiato
Location

Lefka railway station (Greek: Σιδηροδρομικός Σταθμός Λεύκα, romanized: Sidirodromikos stathmos Lefka) is a station on the Piraeus–Platy railway line in Piraeus, Athens. Originally opened on 30 June 1884, it was rebuilt to serve the Athens Suburban Railway lines when this section came into operation in June 2007.

== History ==
The Station opened in its original form on 30 June 1884 on what was the Piraeus, Athens and Peloponnese line (or SPAP) build to connect Piraeus and Athens. This had been superseded by the Lefkas Facilities, also known as the "Piraeus Central Factory", built in 1882. In the early 20th century, a large freight depot was built alongside the station, and was the main freight base of the Greek railways. By the early 20th century, the Lefka railway facilities had become the largest railway complex of machine shops in the whole country.

In 1920, Hellenic State Railways or SEK was established; however, many railways, such as the SPAP continued to be run as a separate company, becoming an independent company once more two years later. Due to growing debts, the SPAP came under government control between 1939 and 1940. During the Axis occupation of Greece (1941–44), Athens was controlled by German military fourses, and the line used for the transport of troops and weapons. During the occupation (and especially during German withdrawal in 1944), the network was severely damaged by both the German army and Greek resistance groups. The track and rolling stock replacement took time following the civil war, with normal service levels resumed around 1948. In 1954 SPAP was nationalized once more. In 1962 the SPAP was amalgamated into SEK. In 1970 OSE became the legal successor to the SEK, taking over responsibilities for most of Greece's rail infrastructure. On 1 January 1971, the station and most of the Greek rail infrastructure was transferred to the Hellenic Railways Organisation S.A., a state-owned corporation. The train shed and machine shop were downgrade in the 1990s but still in operation. Freight traffic declined sharply when the state-imposed monopoly of OSE for the transport of agricultural products and fertilisers ended in the early 1990s. Many small stations of the network with little passenger traffic were closed down.

In 2001 the infrastructure element of OSE was created, known as GAIAOSE, it would henceforth be responsible for the maintenance of stations, bridges and other elements of the network, as well as the leasing and the sale of railway assists. In 2003, OSE launched "Proastiakos SA", as a subsidiary to serve the operation of the suburban network in the urban complex of Athens during the 2004 Olympic Games. In 2005, TrainOSE was created as a brand within OSE to concentrate on rail services and passenger interface. On 7 August 2005, the station was closed for major upgrades to allow the new suburban railway to use the station. On 3 June 2007, its extensive renovation and integration into the new suburban railway network were completed. In 2005 the train shed and machine shop closed. In 2008, all Athens Suburban Railway services were transferred from OSE to TrainOSE.

In 2009, with the Greek debt crisis unfolding OSE's Management was forced to reduce services across the network. Timetables were cutback and routes closed, as the government-run entity attempted to reduce overheads. On 3 June 2007, renovation and integration into the new suburban railway network as Line 1 and Line 2 of Athens Suburban Railway were completed. In 2017 OSE's passenger transport sector was privatised as TrainOSE (Now Hellenic Train), currently, a wholly owned subsidiary of Ferrovie dello Stato Italiane infrastructure, including stations, remained under the control of OSE. Some of the remaining structures of the old works now house the new railway museum of OSE (Ymittos & Adrianou, Kaminia), which was relocated from Thymarakia. In July 2022, the station began being served by Hellenic Train, the rebranded TranOSE.

The station is owned by GAIAOSE, which since 3 October 2001 owns most railway stations in Greece: the company was also in charge of rolling stock from December 2014 until October 2025, when Greek Railways (the owner of the Piraeus–Platy railway) took over that responsibility.

== Facilities ==
The station building is located on two side platforms, with access to the platform level via ramps. The Station buildings are also equipped with a staffed ticket office. At platform level, there are sheltered seating in a new air-conditioned indoor passenger shelter and Dot-matrix display departure and arrival screens or timetable poster boards on both platforms. There is a small car park on-site. Outside the station, there is a bus stop where the local 828 calls.

== Services ==
Since 22 November 2025, the following services call at this station:

- Athens Suburban Railway Line A1 between Piraeus and Athens Airport, with up to one train per hour;
- Athens Suburban Railway Line A4 between Piraeus and Kiato, with up to one train per hour.

== Station layout ==
G
Side platform, doors open on the right
Platform 2
← to Piraeus (terminus)
Platform 1
to Athens Airport / to Kiato (Rentis) →
Side platform, doors open on the right
- Street level
- Concourse
- Customer service
- Tickets
- Exits

== Gallery ==
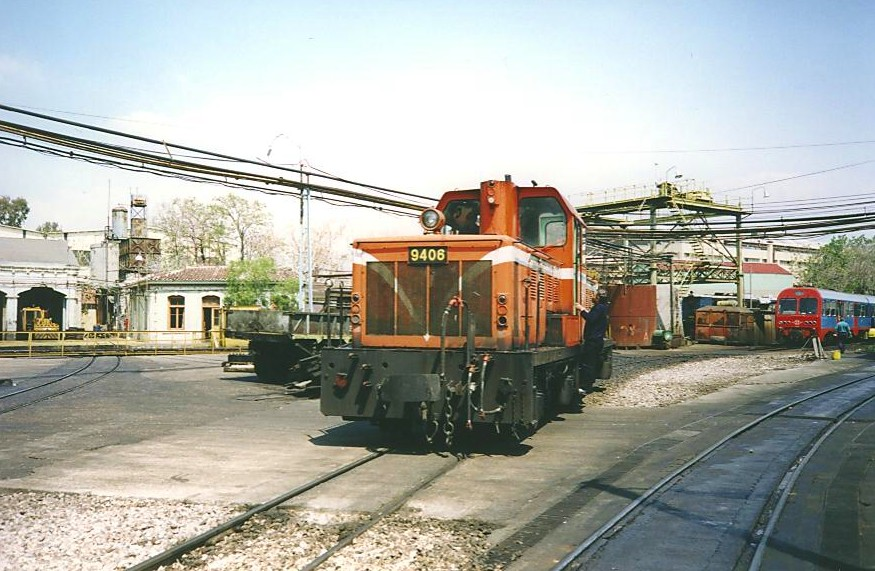
OSE narrow-gauge Mitsubishi shunter, is shunting at Piraeus OSE Depot, Lefka, November 2011.

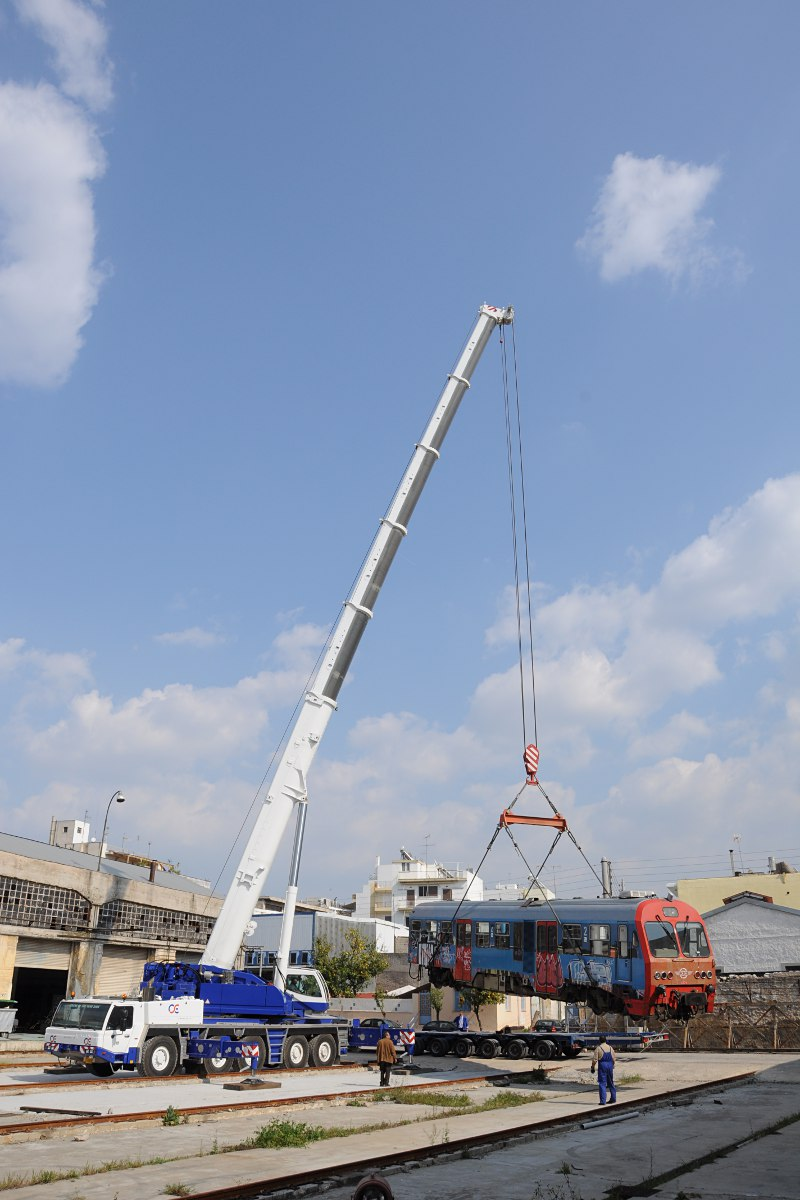
Tadano-Faun ATF all-terrain crane unloads MAN railcar 6525 at the now-abandoned Piraeus Engine Sheds at Lefka, March 2011.

== See also ==
- Railway stations in Greece
- Hellenic Railways Organization
- Hellenic Train
- Proastiakos
