= Metamorfosi railway station =

Rail station near Athens, Greece

Μεταμόρφωση Metamorfosi

General information
- Location: 144 52 Metamorfosi; Greece
- Coordinates: 38°03′36″N 23°45′23″E
- Owner: GAIAOSE
- Operator: Hellenic Train
- Line: Airport–Patras railway
- Platforms: 2
- Tracks: 2

Construction
- Platform levels: 2
- Parking: No
- Cycle facilities: No
- Accessible: Yes

Other information
- Status: Staffed

Key dates
- 30 July 2004: Line opened
- 14 February 2009: Line electrified
- 8 August 2010: Station opened

Services
Preceding station	Suburban Rail	Following station
Kato Acharnes towards Piraeus	Line A1	Irakleio towards Athens Airport
Acharnes Railway Center towards Ano Liosia	Line A2	Irakleio towards Athens Airport
Location

Metamorfosi railway station (Greek: Σιδηροδρομικός Σταθμός Μεταμόρφωσης, romanized: Sidirodromikós Stathmós Metamórfosis) is a station on the Piraeus–Platy railway line, located on Kifisias Avenue in Marousi, a municipality in the regional unit of North Athens, Attica, Greece, located in the median strip of the Attiki Odos motorway. The station opened on 8 August 2010. The station consists of an island platform and a train storage line.

== History ==
The station opened on 8 August 2010, during the Greek debt crisis. With the crisis unfolding OSE's Management was forced to reduce services across the network. Timetables were cutback, and routes closed as the government-run entity attempted to reduce overheads. Services from Athens Airport & Athens were cut back, with some ticket offices closing, reducing the reliability of services and passenger numbers. In 2017 OSE's passenger transport sector was privatised as TrainOSE, currently, a wholly owned subsidiary of Ferrovie dello Stato Italiane infrastructure, including stations, remained under the control of OSE.

The station is owned by GAIAOSE, which since 3 October 2001 owns most railway stations in Greece: the company was also in charge of rolling stock from December 2014 until October 2025, when Greek Railways (the owner of the Airport–Patras railway) took over that responsibility.

== Facilities ==
The station has a ticket office and cafe 'Out of the Box coffee shop'. At platform level, the station is equipped with Dot-matrix display departure and arrival screens on the platforms for passenger information, seating, and information boards, with access to the platforms via life or escalator. Outside the station is a bus stop where the local 604, 724 & B9 call. There is no onsite Parking available at the station.

== Services ==
Since 22 November 2025, the following services call at this station:

- Athens Suburban Railway Line A1 between Piraeus and Athens Airport, with up to one train per hour;
- Athens Suburban Railway Line A2 between Ano Liosia and Athens Airport, with up to two trains per hour on weekdays, and up to one train per hour on weekends and public holidays.

== Station layout ==
L Ground/Concourse	Customer service	Tickets/Exits
Level; Ε1	Platform 2	← to Piraeus / to Ano Liosia (SKA)
Level; Ε1	Island platform, doors will open on the left
Level; Ε1	Platform 1	→ to Athens Airport (Irakleio) →

== See also ==
- Hellenic Railways Organization
- Hellenic Train
- Proastiakos
- P.A.Th.E./P.
