= Athens International Airport S.A. =

- Company type: S.A.
- Industry: Transportation
- Founded: 1996; 30 years ago
- Headquarters: Athens International Airport, Spata, Greece
- Key people: Riccardo Lambiris (Chairman)
- Products: Airport operations and services
- Revenue: €382.23 million (2021)
- Operating income: €282.44 million (2021)
- Net income: €158.81 million (2021)
- Total assets: €2.224 billion (2021)
- Total equity: €990.28 million (2021)
- Owner: AviAlliance (50,00002%); Hellenic Corporation of Assets & Participations S.A. (25,5%); Free float (24,49998%)
- Number of employees: 14.345 (2021)
- Website: www.aia.gr

Athens International Airport S.A. or AIA is the airport authority that owns and manages Athens International Airport.

== History ==
AIA was created in 1996 with the Greek government as a majority stakeholder (55%) and Hochtief holding 45% of the capital. AIA received a 250 million-fund from the EU to build the new Athens airport Operations of the Athens International Airport started March 29, 2001. In 2004, it was declared European airport of the year. The airport was built in preparation for the 2004 Summer Olympics. AIA holds a 30-year concession on the Athens airport, concession that will expire in 2026.

In October 2012, AIA launched the largest unified photovoltaic installation at any airport worldwide, an 8 MWp and 160,000 square meter project that cost 20 million euros and is expected to provide 20% (11 million kWh) of the airport's annual energy consumption.

In March 2013, AIA reduced its airport fees (the highest in Europe then) in a move to increase traffic. Ryanair publicly attacked the airport operator and its high fees, arguing that those were to be blamed for the drop of air traffic in recent years.

In May 2013, Hochtief sold its 40% stakes of AIA to Canada's Public Sector Pension Investment Board (PSP Investments) for 1.1 billion euros.

In February 2014, a Chinese consortium consisting of FPAM and the Shenzhen Airport company expressed its intention to buy the 55% shares held by the Greek government.

In September 2014, a Greek court found that Hochtief did not pay value added tax in Greece for more than 20 years, holding the German company accountable for reimbursing 500 million euros to the Greek government, even though a British court ruled in favor of Hochtief in March 2013.

In the midst of the Greek government-debt crisis, Europe has constantly advised the Greek government to privatize AIA SA, yet political resistance has led this recommendation unenacted.

In June 2019, Greece's Hellenic Republic Asset Development Fund invited schemes to submit an Expression of Interest (Phase A) for the acquisition of a 30% stake in Athens International Airport SA. The deadline (initially until September 2019) expired on October 29, 2019 and ten investment schemes expressed their interest, including Groupe ADP, APG Asset Management, AviAlliance, Vinci Airports, Ferrovial, First Sentier Investors, Global Infrastructure Partners and a consortium of Ardian Infrastructure Fund S.C.A., Sicar and Ardian Infrastructure Fund V B S.C.S. SICAV – RAIF, another consortium of KKR and Egis and a consortium of MEIF 6 Attic Investment, RAFFLES INFRA HOLDING and Chengdong Investment Corporation.
