= Stadler GTW in Greece =

Two classes of Stadler trains in Greece

OSE 560 & 4500 class
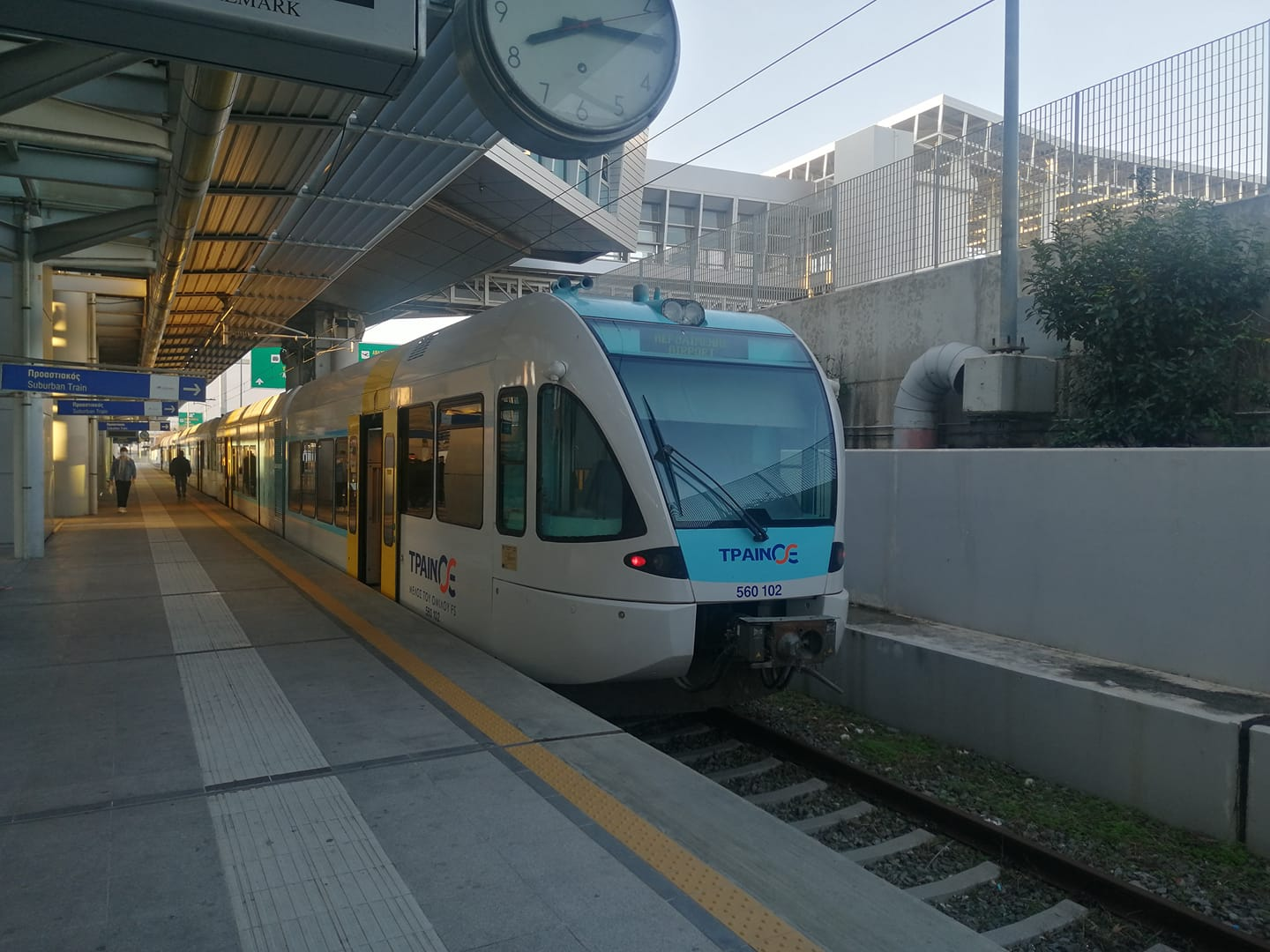
- 560 class trainset at Athens Airport station in 2020
- Manufacturer: Stadler Rail
- Family name: GTW
- Constructed: 2003
- Fleet numbers: 560 101/901/201–560 117/917/217; 4501–4512
- Operator: Hellenic Train

Specifications
- Width: 560: 3 m (9 ft 10 in); 4500: 2.8 m (9 ft 2 in)
- Height: 4.11 m (13 ft 6 in)
- Wheel diameter: 860–750 mm (34–30 in) (new–worn)
- Maximum speed: 115 km/h (71 mph)
- Engine type: Diesel-electric
- Acceleration: 1.0 m/s^{2} (3.3 ft/s^{2})
- Deceleration: 1.2 m/s^{2} (3.9 ft/s^{2}) (service); 1.4 m/s^{2} (4.6 ft/s^{2}) (emergency)
- Power supply: Diesel fuel
- UIC classification: 2′Bo2′
- Multiple working: 1–3 trainsets
- Track gauge: 560: 1,435 mm (4 ft 8 1/2 in) standard gauge 4500: 1,000 mm (3 ft 3 3/8 in) metre gauge

In Greece, there are two similar classes of Stadler GTW trainsets, namely the 560 (standard gauge) and the 4500 (metre gauge), which are operated by Hellenic Train and are part of OSE rolling stock. These are suburban DMUs with two coaches, of type G.T.W. 2/6, which were built by a consortium of Stadler, Bombardier and Hellenic Shipyards (Note: The original order was placed by AdTranz, which merged with Bombardier.) and were put into operation by OSE, between 2003 and 2004. The trainsets are either standard (560 class) or metre gauge (4500 series), but with the same technical characteristics (capacity, speed, appearance, manufacturers, power supply and number of coaches). They can be coupled in multiple coupling with up to three railcars (composition of 9 coaches together with the drive vehicles).

In total, there are 29 such trainsets, 17 of the 560 class and 12 of the 4500 class. They can accommodate up to 200 passengers, 106 standing and 94 seated. They have a diesel engine type MTU 12V 183 with a power of 550 kW and reach speeds of up to 115 kilometers per hour (standard gauge) and 100 kilometers per hour (metre gauge). These trainsets are also known informally as "Railbus" (literally "rail bus"), a name used by normal people to describe the light rail cars to which they belong.

== Features ==
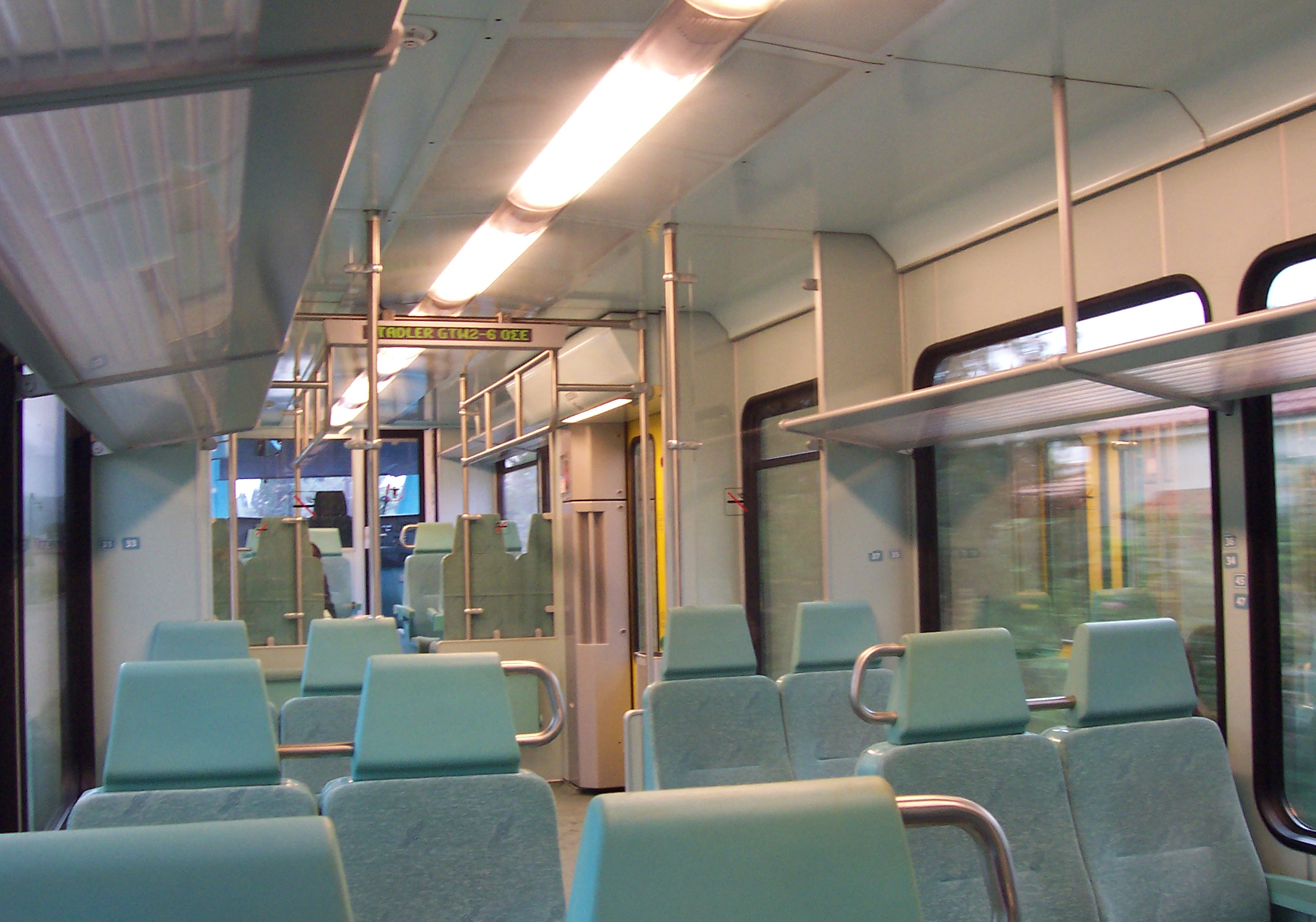
Interior of the trainsets

The trainsets are air conditioned and have destination tables, a passenger information system and enclosed toilets, which are easily accessible for the disabled. In the middle, they have a drive coach that is a power module, which carries the engines of trains.

== Route ==
The 560 class serves trains on the Lianokladi-Stylida railway line, connecting the latter with Athens.

The 4500 class serves trains on the Katakolo-Olympia railway line, as well as the Patras Suburban Railway

In the past, they also operated routes on the Athens-Chalkida, Athens-Afidnai, etc. routes, on which they withdrew due to their electrification, while they have also been tested on the Thessaloniki-Edessa route.

Prior to the suspension of the metre-gauge network for most of it in 2011, they operated on other lines of the network, such as Corinth-Pyrgos-Kalamata.

From 2020, they also operate on the Kiato-Aigio line (of the total Athens Airport-Patras axis)

Finally, the standard Railbus are now the only trains that serve the old railway line Tithorea-Bralos-Leianokladi, which has now been officially bypassed.

== History ==
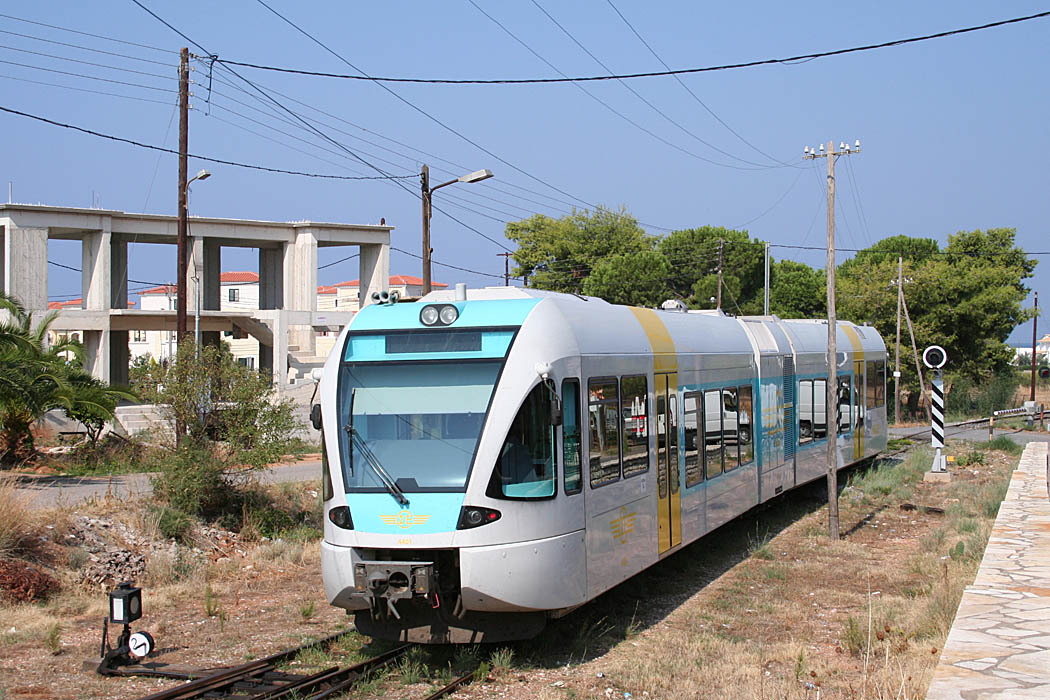
Train 351 from Kalamata to Pyrgos leaving Kalo Nero with a 4500 class trainset in 2007

In 1997, the MAN-2 620 class (formerly 701) and Ganz-Mavag AA.91 class were in service on the standard gauge network, while the metre-gauge 6521, MAN-4 class 6501 and Ganz-Mavag 6451 and 6461 classes were on the metre-gauge network. Although they were successful, they were outdated, so new, high-quality trainsets were required. For the order of the new trainsets, OSE turned to the Stadler-ADtranz-Scaramanga Shipyard consortium, through program agreements. The order included 17 new DMU type railcars for the standard gauge network (560 class) and 12 for the metre gauge network (4500 class).

The G.T.W. (pronounced Ghe-Teh-Ve) means Gelenktriebwagen, which translates to "articular trainset", ie having two or more parts connected to each other, while 2/6 means that of the 6 axles, 2 are drivable. As for the "Railbus", it is used informally to describe light trainsets. The arrangement of the trainsets is 2′Bo2′ and they are made of aluminum and steel alloys, and in the middle there is a drive vehicle, which is called "Power Module", where the 550 kW power diesel engine named MTU 12V 183, as well as the other mechanisms are located.

The final assembly of the 560 took place at the Stadler plant in Bussnang, while the 4500 at the Rhaetische Bahn plant in Switzerland. The first composition of 3 coaches arrived on June 25, 2003 and from November 24, the first 4 were launched on the lines Athens-Chalkida and Athens-Afidnes with a temporary headquarters in Agios Ioannis Rentis depot, while 560 110 was transferred to Thessaloniki depot and was launched on the Thessaloniki-Edessa line.

In December 2018, GAIAOSE announced a competition for a feasibility study for the conversion of the units of the standard gauge series into fully electric ones

== Appearance ==
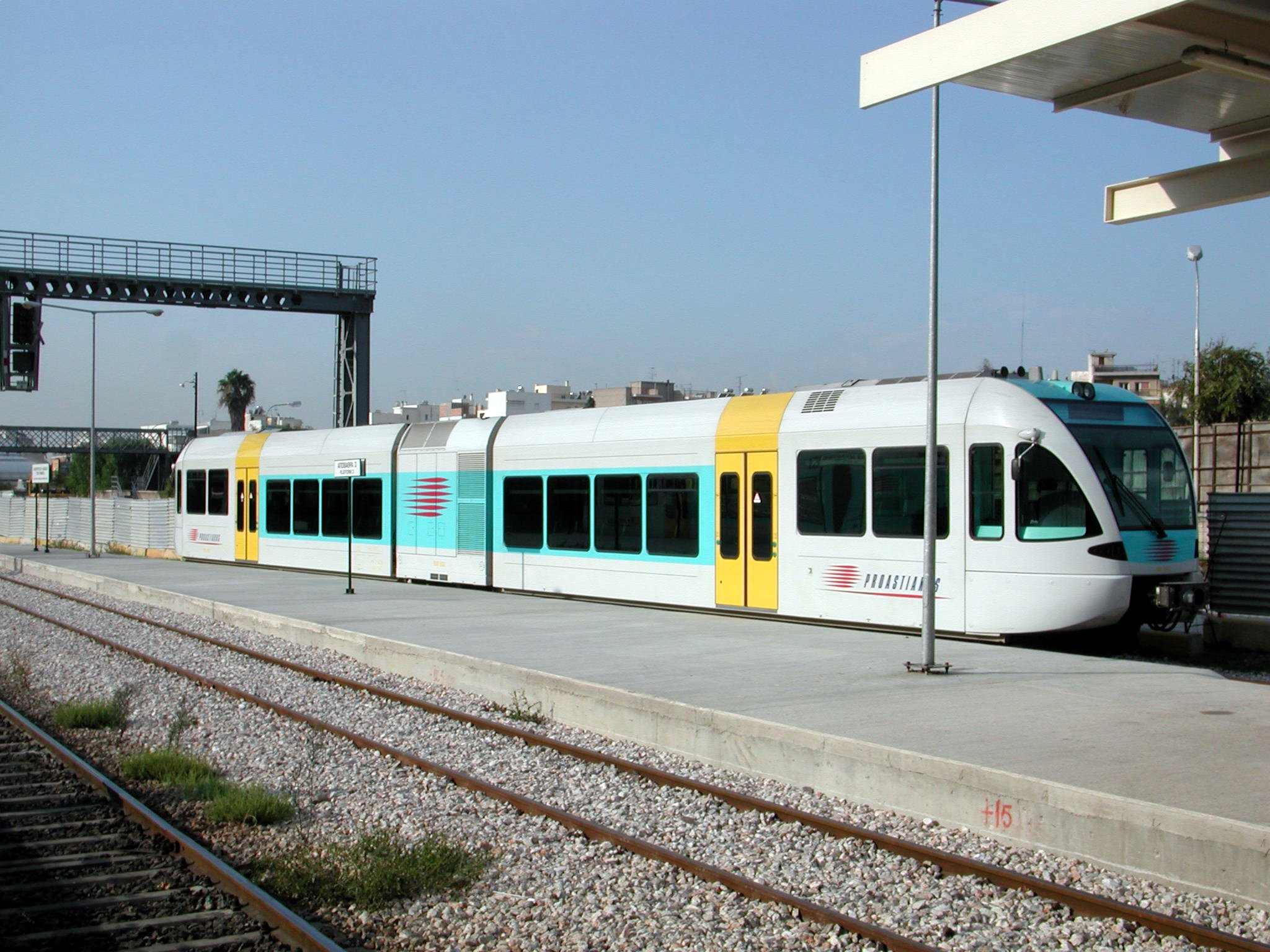
Car train with the colors of the Suburban (Athens, 2005)

The color of the cars consists of a white surface with blue elements on the front and yellow around the doors. The logos of OSE, TRAINOSE, or Proastiakos can be used.
