= OSE class 460 =

OSE Class 460
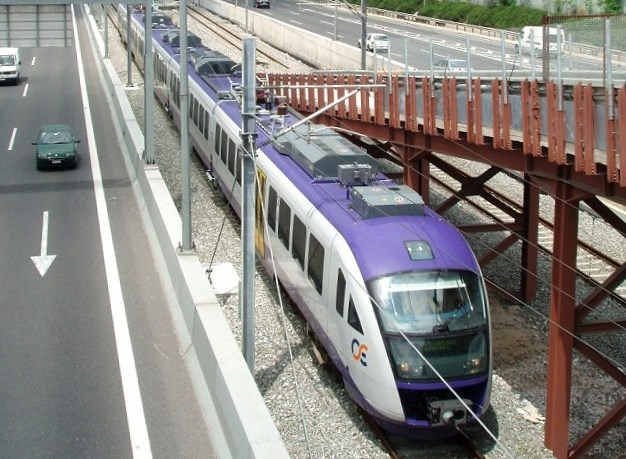
- Class 460 trainset near Nerantziotissa in 2007
- In service: 2006 – present
- Constructed: 2004/2005/2006
- Number built: 20
- Number in service: 20
- Fleet numbers: 460-101 – 460 120
- Operator: Hellenic Train

Specifications
- Train length: 89.3 metres (292 ft 11 3/4 in)
- Width: 2.8 metres (9 ft 2 1/4 in)
- Maximum speed: 160 km/h (99 mph)
- Weight: 185 tonnes (408,000 lb)
- Power output: 3,840 kW (5,150 hp)
- Electric system: 25 kV 50 Hz AC
- Current collection: Pantograph
- UIC classification: Bo′(2)′(Bo)′(Bo)′(2)′Bo′
- Track gauge: 1,435 mm (4 ft 8 1/2 in) standard gauge

The OSE Class 460 is the first class of electric trainsets (EMU) in Greece and, together with the 621 class, it is the second most recent series of railcars operated by TRAINOSE after the 3107 class. They are OSE rolling stock and belong to the Desiro Classic generation, while they were manufactured by Siemens in 2006. They come in line with the 660 class but their main difference is that the 460 is electric-powered with five coaches while the 660 is diesel-powered by two coaches but they have the same manufacturers and gauge.

Class 460 trainsets can be coupled to another trainset on a double coupling to form an EMU-10, controlled by the driver of the leading cab. In total, there are 20 such trainsets, numbered 460 101/460 201 – 460 120/460 220. They have an electric engine and reach speeds of up to 180 km / h, and have a capacity of 304 people Their weight is 150 tonnes. The traction of the train is carried out by two pantographs that touch in aerial cables. Their voltage is 25 kV 50 Hz AC.

== Route ==
Series 460 is used on the Athens Suburban Railway and in the Thessaloniki Suburban Railway.

== History ==
In 2004, OSE proceeded to order 20 trainsets on the Desiro family of 5 coaches by Siemens AG which, in collaboration with Greek shipyards and based on the Desiro platform, supplied OSE with the Desiro EMU-5 trains. They were built in the Greek Shipyards of Skaramangas. In 2004, one of them came to Greece and eventually received by OSE in 2006. On 14-2-2009 the routes Ano Liossia – Airport with these trains started. Already in 2016, it was operating on the suburban line of Athens to the airport, Chalkis and Kiato, as well as in Thessaloniki, in the line to Larissa, however, with the gradual electrification of the railway lines, they were also launched on the Piraeus Line. On 28 March 2016, the first Desiro EMU-5 series 460 was launched in Dhekelia.

== Livery ==
The coloring of the wagons consists of purple horizontal strips on white, covering the largest surface of the vehicles. The doors are yellow.
