= Athens Airport station =

Athens Suburban Railway and Athens Metro station

Διεθνής Αερολιμένας Αθηνών Athens International Airport
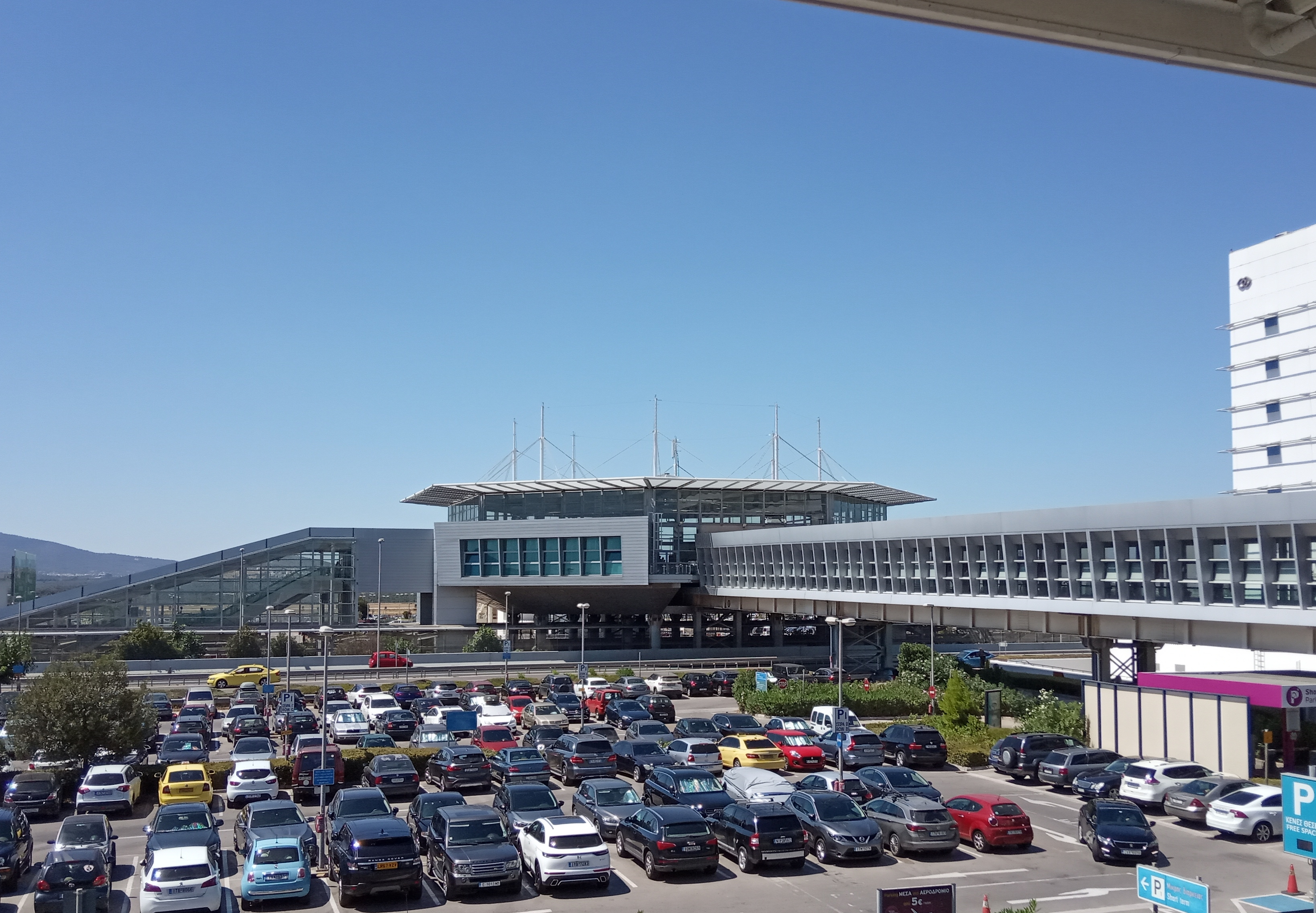
- Athens International Airport train station (2019)

General information
- Location: 190 04 Spata; Greece
- Coordinates: 37.936890°N 23.944700°E
- Owner: Athens International Airport
- Line: Airport–Patras railway
- Platforms: 2
- Tracks: 3
- Train operators: Hellenic Train (Suburban Rail); STASY (Metro)

Construction
- Structure type: At-grade
- Parking: Yes
- Accessible: Yes

Other information
- Website: Official page

Key dates
- 30 July 2004: Opened
- 4 June 2007: Suburban Rail electrified

Services
Preceding station	Suburban Rail	Following station
Koropi towards Piraeus	Line A1	Terminus
Koropi towards Ano Liosia	Line A2	Terminus
Preceding station	Athens Metro	Following station
Koropi towards Dimotiko Theatro	Line 3	Terminus
Location

Athens Airport (Greek: Αεροδρόμιο, Aerodromio), also known as Athens International Airport (Διεθνής Αερολιμένας Αθηνών, Diethnis Aerolimenas Athinon) on signage, is a railway station and metro station that serves the international airport of Athens, Greece. It operates on both the Athens Suburban Railway as well as Line 3 of the Athens Metro. It is the first and only train station in Greece that is not managed by GAIAOSE. It is owned by the airport, which charges the train operating companies (Hellenic Train and STASY) fees for its use.

== History ==
The station opened on 30 July 2004, two weeks before the Athens Olympics. Although it was projected that only commuter rail would use the station, the Athens Metro operating company decided to extend Line 3 to the airport. However, building new tracks was not economically viable, so the route would be served by dual-voltage second-generation trains and would share tracks with Suburban Railway trains between Doukissis Plakentias station and the airport. Because of the limited availability of these trains (7 in total), only 1 or 2 per hour reach the station, leaving the airport every 36 minutes from 06:10 to 23:34.

The decision to extend Line 3 to the airport forced a change to the station design; Metro trains have a higher floor than Suburban Railway trains, so the central track had to be lowered. This is why initial services to the airport did not use any stations between Doukissis Plakentias and the airport. The intermediate stations did not have the tracks lowered; parts of the platforms were raised in 2006. Since then, all intermediate stations have been used by both services.

== Access ==
The railway station is immediately adjacent to the airport terminal, accessible by an elevated walkway. Because of the additional cost of using the station, there is a surcharge for passengers entering or exiting the airport. As of 2023, the base fare to the airport is €9, with varying prices for round trips or groups.

== Facilities ==
The station building is above the platforms, with access to the platform level via stairs, lifts or escalators. The station buildings are also equipped with toilets and a ticket/Information office. There is cafe and seating in which you can sit and eat. At the platform level, there are sheltered seating, Dot-matrix display departure or arrival screens and timetable poster boards on all the platforms.

== Services ==
Since 22 November 2025, the following services call at this station:

- Athens Suburban Railway Line A1 towards Piraeus (via Metamorfosi), with up to one train per hour;
- Athens Suburban Railway Line A2 towards Ano Liosia, with up to two trains per hour on weekdays, and up to one train per hour on weekends and public holidays;
- Athens Metro Line 3 towards Dimotiko Theatro (via Syntagma), with up to one train every 36 minutes.

== Station layout ==
Access/Concourse; A/C	Customer service	Tickets; Exits
Level; L1	Platform 3	← to Piraeus / to Ano Liosia (Koropi)
Level; L1	Island platform (Spanish solution), outbound or interchange to
Level; L1	Platform 2	← to Dimotiko Theatro (Koropi)
Level; L1	Island platform (Spanish solution), doors will open on the left, right
Level; L1	Platform 1	Unused
Level; L1	Side platform (Spanish solution), outbound or interchange to

== Future developments ==
As the airport's passenger numbers are rising, services may get denser and Track 1 could be used again. Moreover, for many years there have been plans to extend Suburban Railway services to Rafina, a suburb of Athens and the third largest harbour of the city as well. Although original plans show the line branching off the main one after Pallini or Doukissis Plakentias Station, then running in a reserved-for-this-purpose median of the A62 Mount Hymmetus Ring Road and then extending to Rafina, recent plans have called for an extension of the line from the Airport. Such an extension would be shorter and less expensive to build, however, it has been unpopular due to the fact that the travelling time from and to Rafina will be longer and certain areas will not be served.

== Gallery ==
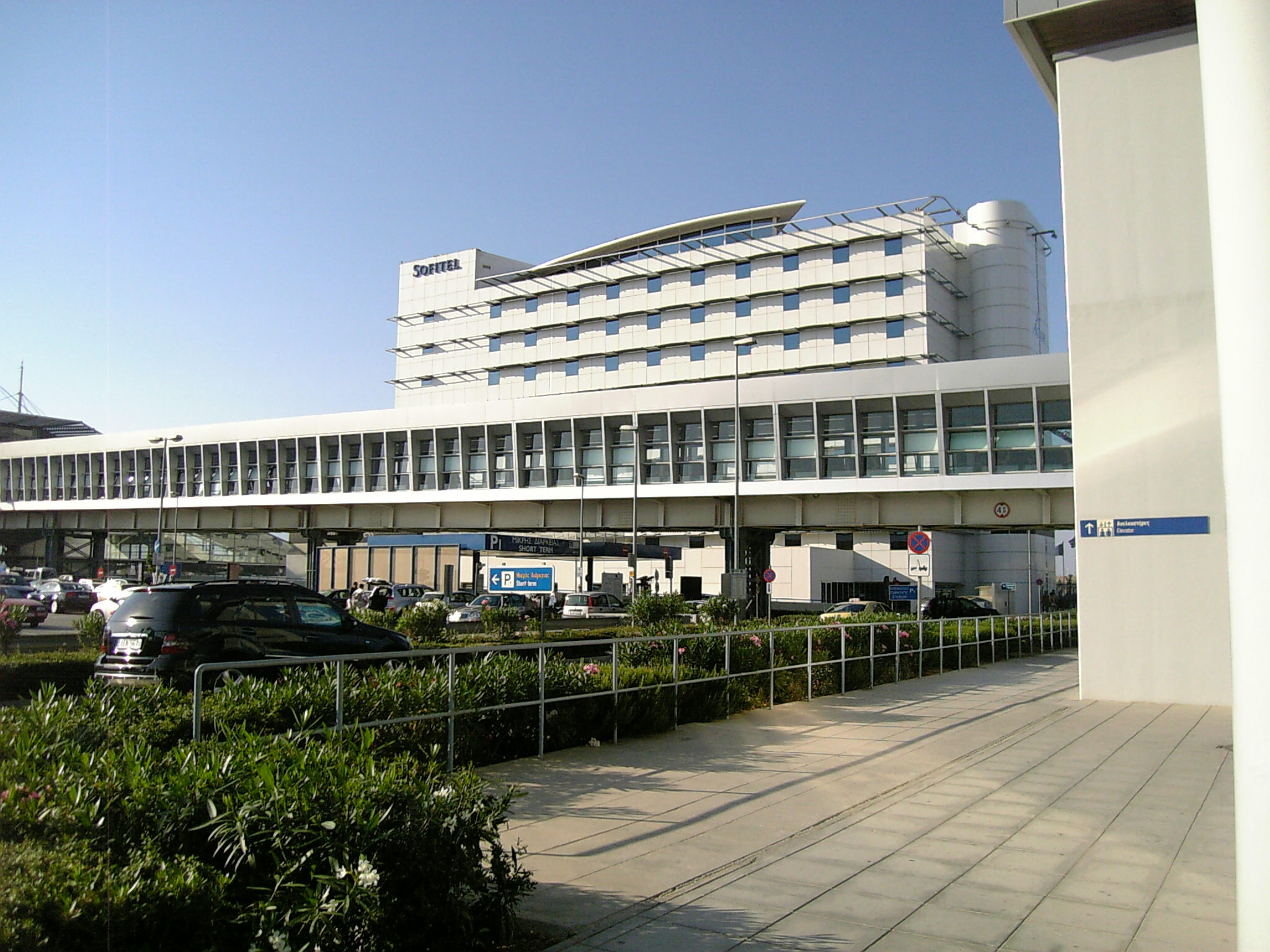
Footbridge to the station and the Sofitel hotel, 2008

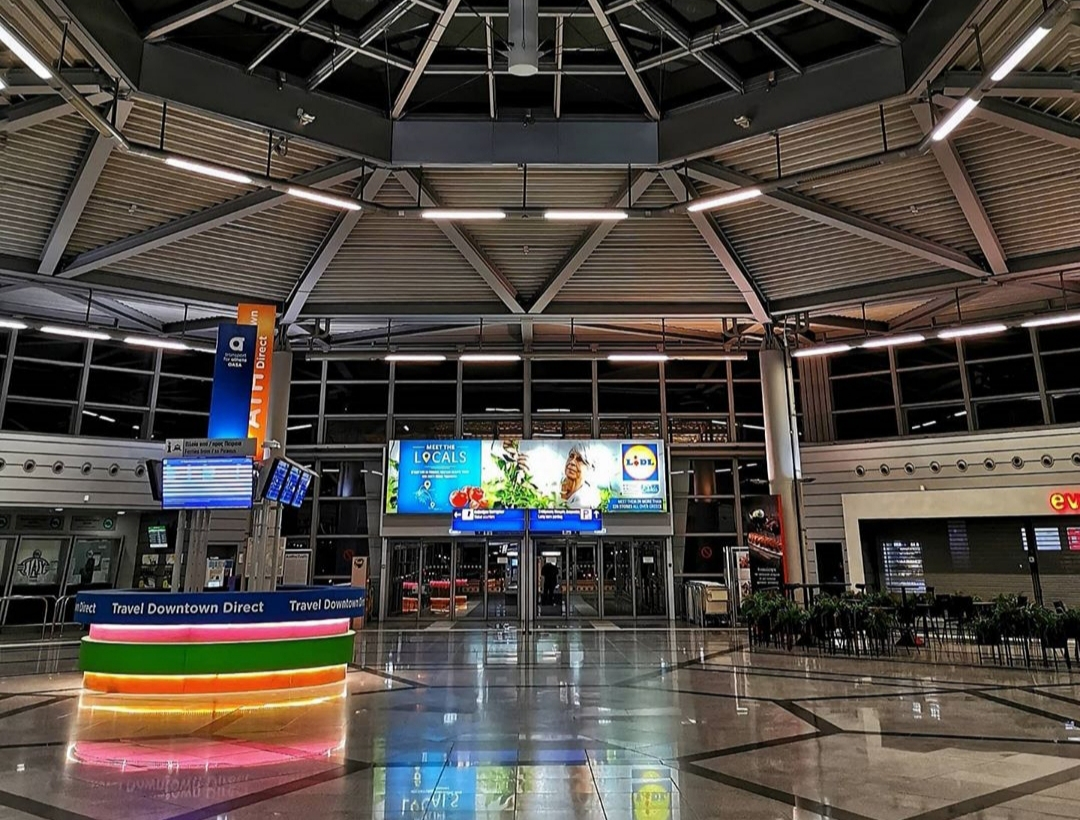
The station concourse, 2020

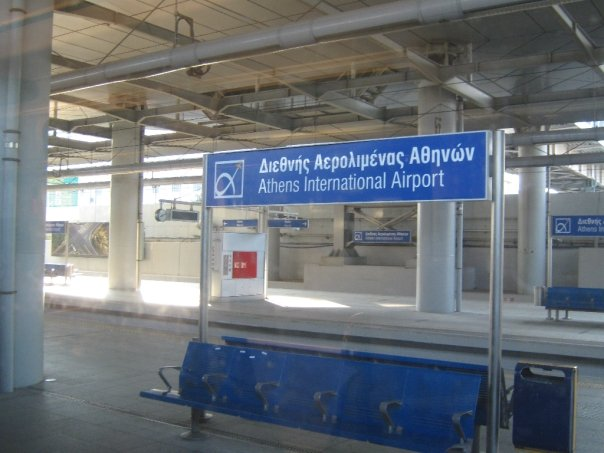
View of the platforms, 2011

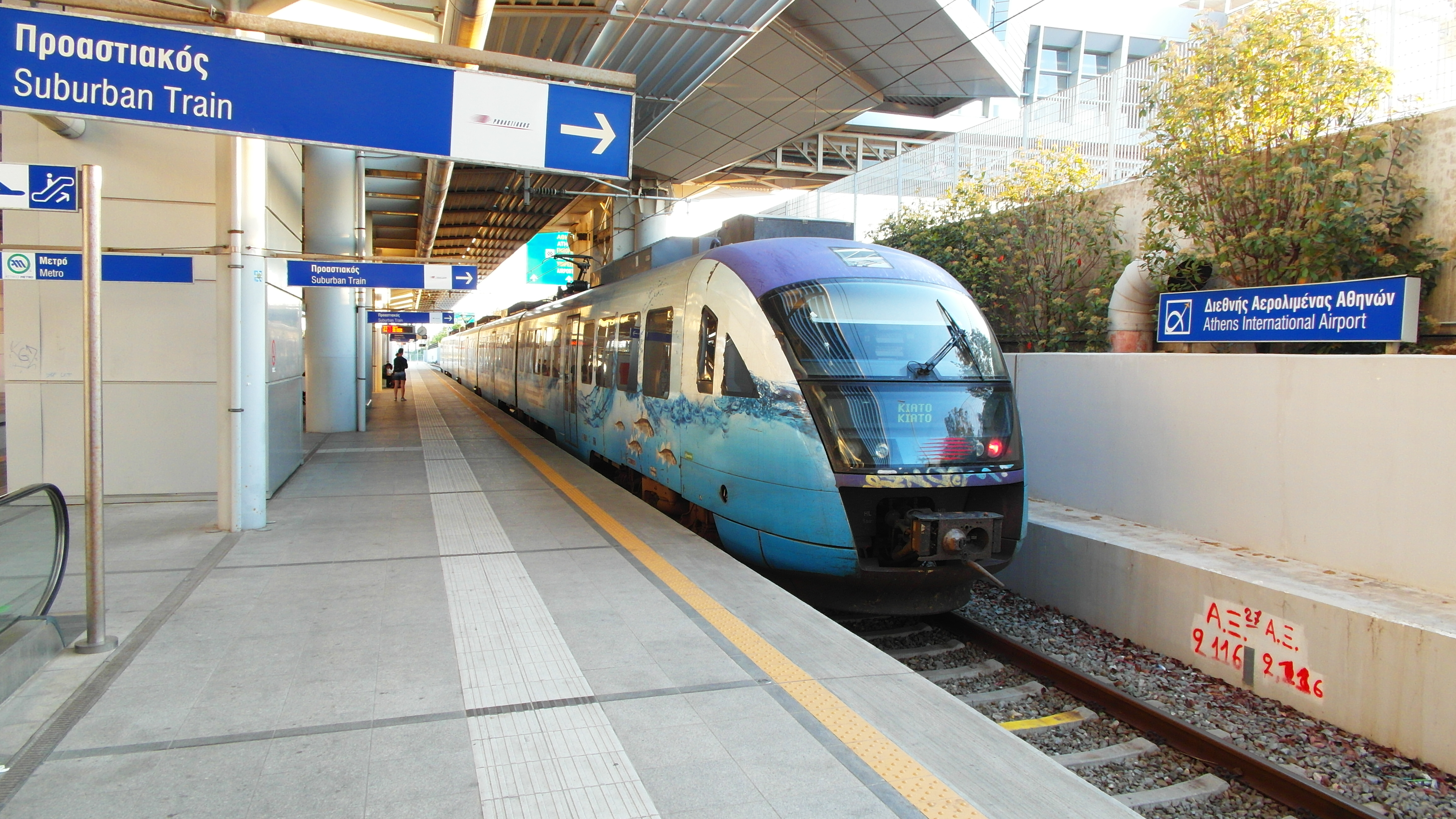
OSE class 460 train to Kiato, 2015

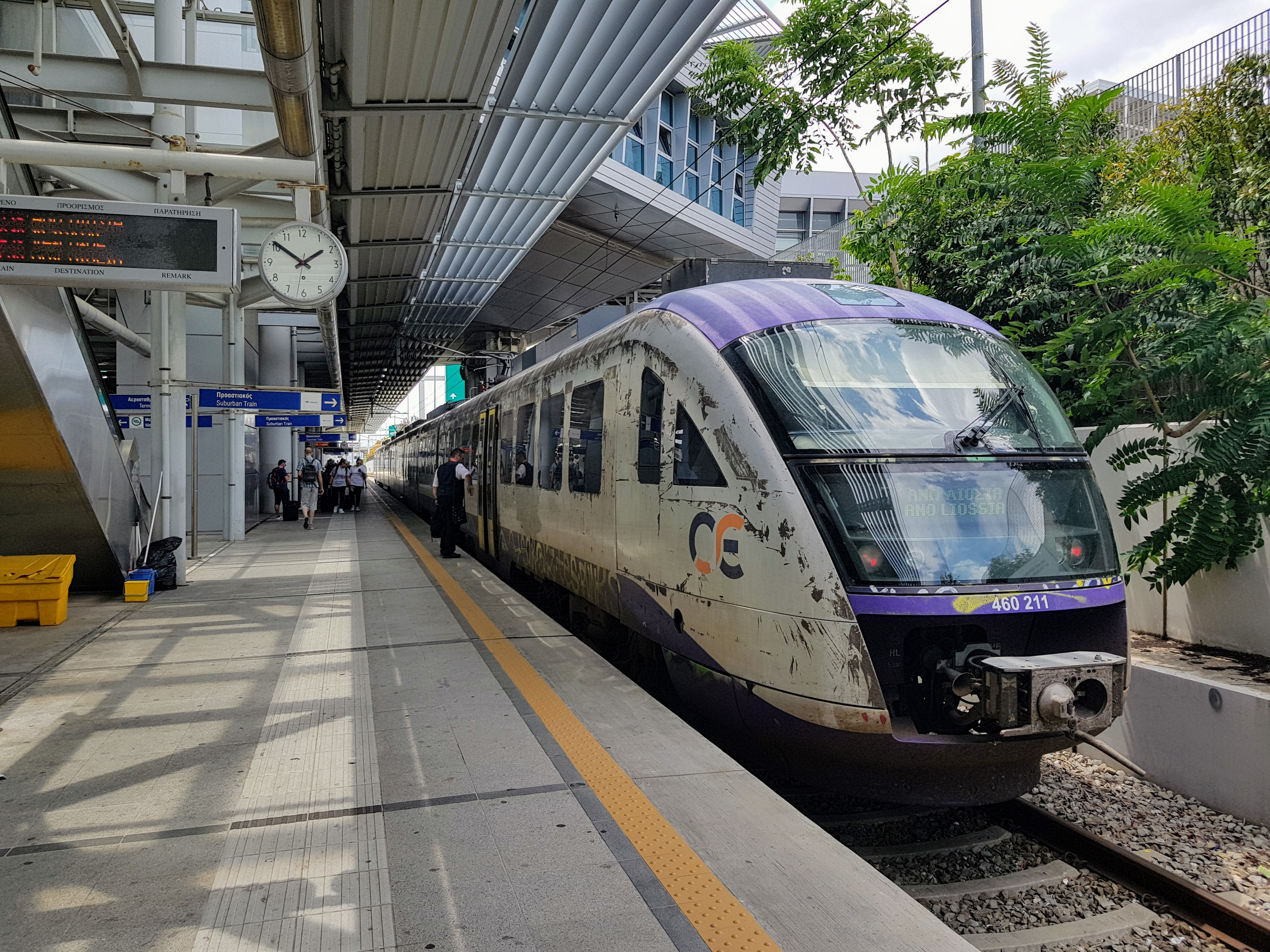
OSE class 460 train to Ano Liosia, 2018

== See also ==
- Railway stations in Greece
- Hellenic Railways Organization
- Hellenic Train
- Proastiakos
