= Ano Liosia railway station =

Station on the Proastiakos railway of Athens, Greece

Άνω Λιόσια Ano Liosia
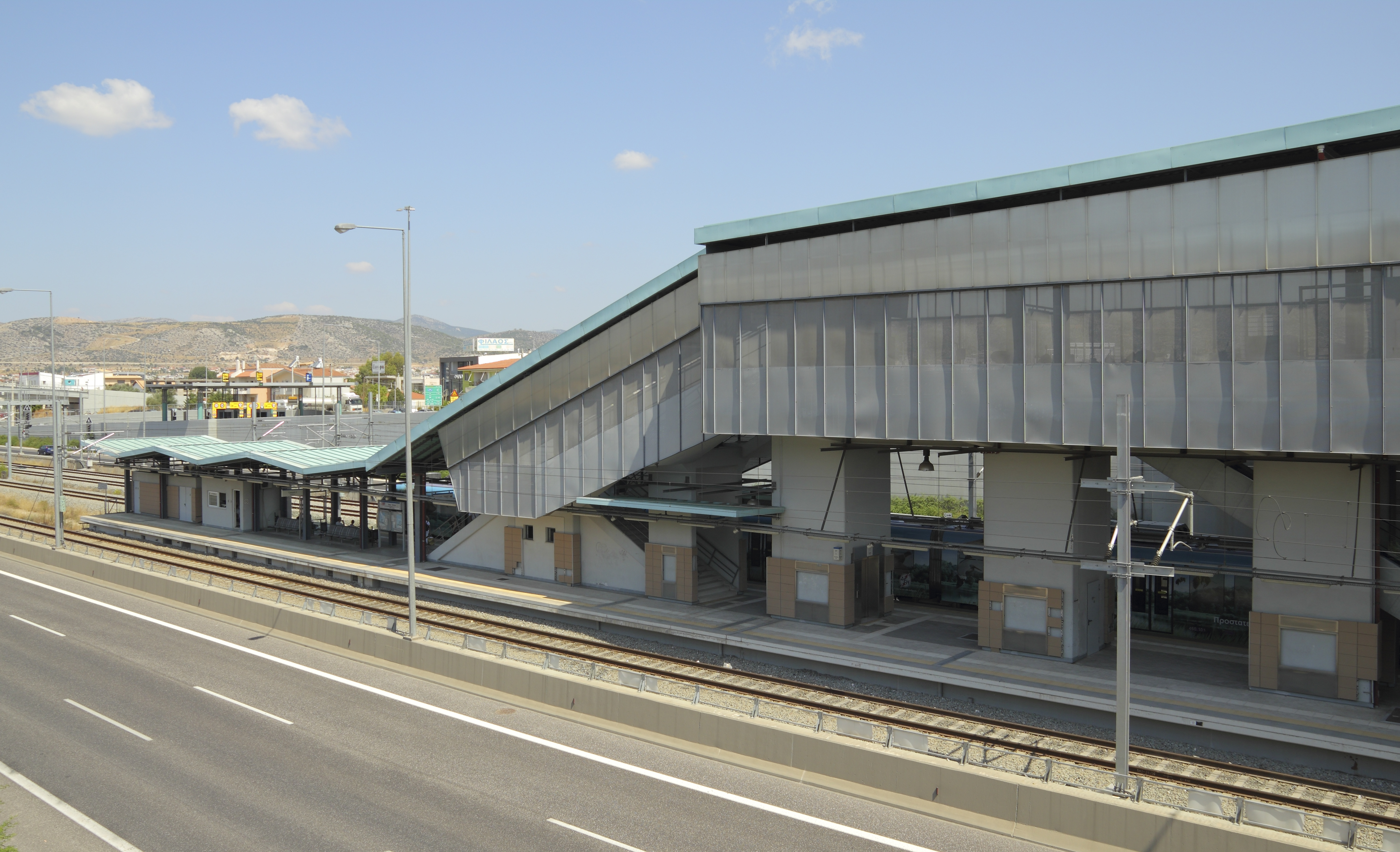
- A view of the station in 2013.

General information
- Location: Ano Liosia, 133 41, Fyli; West Attica; Greece
- Coordinates: 38°04′15″N 23°42′36″E
- Owner: GAIAOSE
- Operator: Hellenic Train
- Line: Airport–Patras railway
- Platforms: 2
- Tracks: 4
- Bus routes: 723, 749, 712, B12
- Connections: Bus

Construction
- Structure type: at-grade
- Platform levels: 2
- Parking: Yes
- Accessible: Yes

Other information
- Status: Staffed

Key dates
- 27 September 2005: Line opened
- 18 July 2006: Station opened
- 14 February 2009: Line electrified

Services
Preceding station	Suburban Rail	Following station
Terminus	Line A2	Acharnes Railway Center towards Athens Airport
Aspropyrgos towards Kiato	Line A4	Zefyri towards Piraeus
Location

Ano Liosia (Greek: Σιδηροδρομικός Σταθμός Άνω Λιοσίων, romanized: Sidirodromikós Stathmós Áno Liosíon) is a train station in Ano Liosia, a western suburb in the municipality of Fyli, West Attica, Greece. It is located in the median strip of the Attiki Odos motorway, and has a single island platform. The station is the western terminus of the Athens Suburban Railway to and from Athens Airport. It is also served by trains to and from Piraeus and Kiato. it sits a 700 meaters from Zefyri, or a 2 min train ride.

== History ==
It opened on 18 July 2006. In 2008, all Athens Suburban Railway services were transferred from OSE to TrainOSE. In 2009, with the Greek debt crisis unfolding OSE's Management was forced to reduce services across the network. Timetables were cutback and routes closed, as the government-run entity attempted to reduce overheads. In 2017 OSE's passenger transport sector was privatised as TrainOSE, currently, a wholly owned subsidiary of Ferrovie dello Stato Italiane rail infrastructure, remained under the control of OSE and station infrastructure under Gaiose. In July 2022, the station began being served by Hellenic Train, the rebranded TranOSE.

The station is owned by GAIAOSE, which since 3 October 2001 owns most railway stations in Greece: the company was also in charge of rolling stock from December 2014 until October 2025, when Greek Railways (the owner of the Airport–Patras railway) took over that responsibility.

== Facilities ==
The station building is above the platforms, with access to the platform level via stairs or lifts. The station buildings are also equipped with toilets and a ticket office (closed as of 2020). There is no cafe or shop on-site. However, vending machines are provided (inoperable as of 2021). At the platform level, there are sheltered seating, Dot-matrix display departure or arrival screens and timetable poster boards on all the platforms. There are lifts and stairs to the Island platform's. Access to platforms 1-2 is via the main concourse. There is no passenger car park at this station. Outside the station, there is a taxi rank and bus stop where the local 723, 749, 712 & B12 call.

== Services ==
Since 22 November 2025, the following services call at this station:

- Athens Suburban Railway Line A2 towards Athens Airport, with up to two trains per hour on weekdays, and up to one train per hour on weekends and public holidays.
- Athens Suburban Railway Line A4 between Piraeus and Kiato, with up to one train per hour.

== Station layout ==
L Ground/Concourse	Customer service	Tickets/Exits
Level; L1	Though Line	not in use
Level; L1	Platform 1A	← to Kiato (Aspropyrgos)
Level; L1	Platform 1B	to Athens Airport (SKA) →
Level; L1	Island platform, doors will open on the left, right
Level; L1	Platform 2	to Piraeus (Zefyri) →

== Future ==
In 2009, a future connection to Line 2 of the Athens Metro was officially proposed. However, according to the October 2022 plan, the Line 2 station will be built in Zefyri instead.

== See also ==
- Railway stations in Greece
- Greek Railways
- Hellenic Railways Organization
- TrainOSE
- Proastiakos
