= Piraeus station =

Athens Metro and Athens Suburban Railway station

Πειραιάς Piraeus
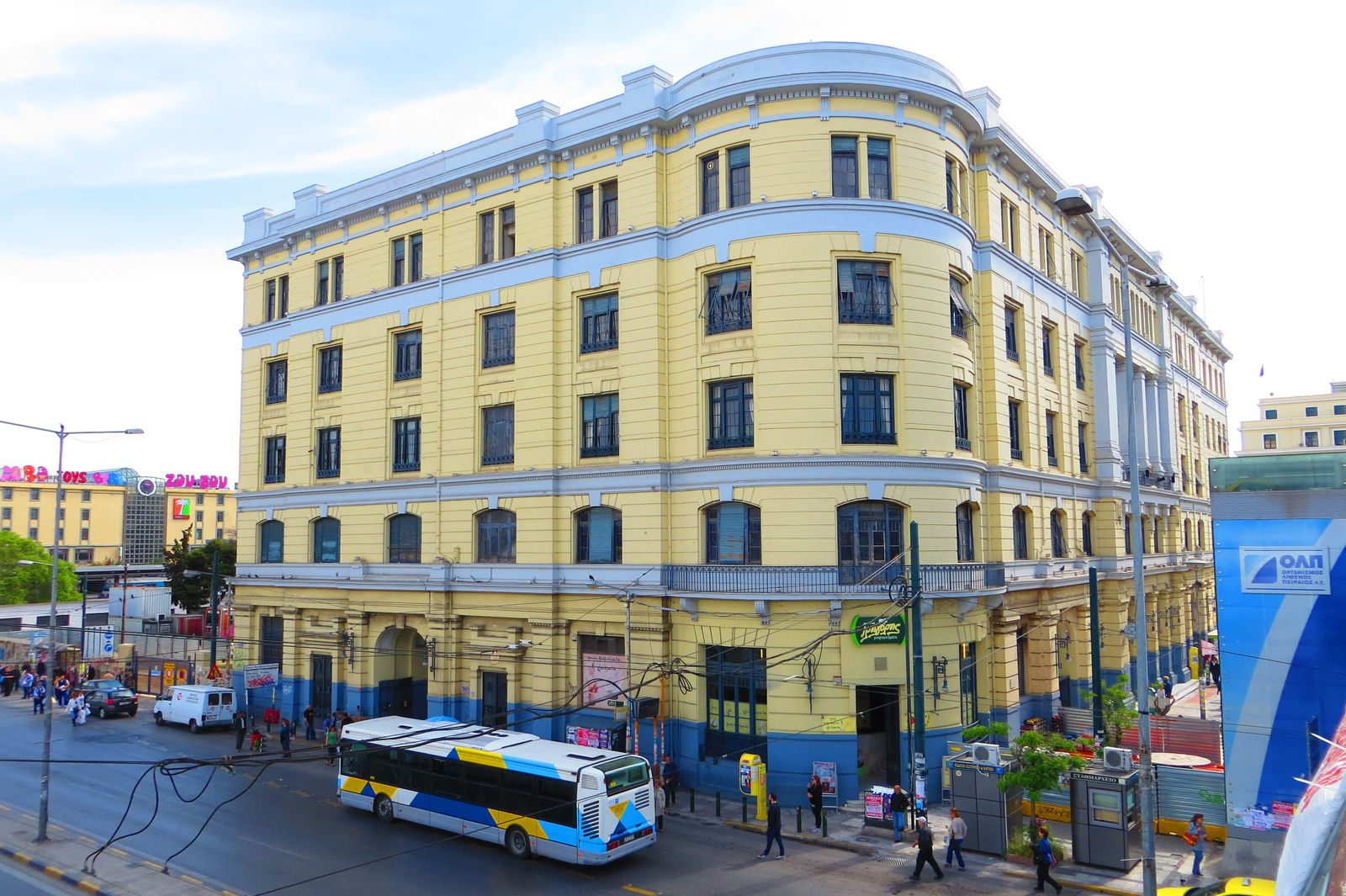
- The line 1 station building, built in 1928 from EIS (Hellenic Electric Railways S.A) company

General information
- Location: 185 45 Piraeus; Greece
- Coordinates: 37.948020°N 23.643555°E
- Owner: GAIAOSE (Suburban Rail); STASY (Metro)
- Operator: Hellenic Train (Suburban Rail); STASY (Metro)
- Lines: Piraeus–Platy railway
- Platforms: 10
- Tracks: 8

Construction
- Structure type: At-grade (Line 1 and Suburban Rail); Underground (Line 3)
- Platform levels: 2
- Accessible: Yes

Key dates
- 27 February 1869: Line 1 station opened
- 30 June 1884: Railway station opened
- 1904: Line 1 electrified
- 30 June 1928: Line 1 station rebuilt
- December 2001: Line 1 station rebuilt
- 4 June 2007: Railway station rebuilt
- 1 February 2018: Railway electrified
- 10 October 2022: Line 3 station opened

Services
Preceding station	Athens Metro	Following station
Terminus	Line 1	Faliro towards Kifissia
Dimotiko Theatro Terminus	Line 3	Maniatika towards Athens Airport
Preceding station	Suburban Rail	Following station
Terminus	Line A1	Lefka towards Athens Airport
Terminus	Line A4	Lefka towards Kiato
Former services
Preceding station	Former railways	Following station
Terminus	Piraeus–Patras Railway (SPAP)	Lefka towards Patras
Location

Piraeus (Greek: Πειραιάς, Peiraias) is the name of two railway stations in Piraeus, Athens, Greece, approximately 9 kilometres (5.6 mi) south-west of the centre of Athens. The southern building is an interchange station between Line 1 and Line 3 and is the present terminus of Athens Metro Line 1, formerly the Athens-Piraeus Railways Co that opened in 1869. The northern building is the railway terminus for standard gauge railway services of the Athens Suburban Railway to the Acharnes Railway Center and Chalcis. Both buildings are located next to the seaport, with the Electric Railways Museum of Piraeus located in the metro station, in the space of the former Post Office.

== History ==
=== Piraeus metro station ===
The Piraeus metro station opened in 1869 by Sap company to connect Piraeus and Athens (at the time Piraeus was not yet integral part of Athens agglomeration) as conventional steam single-track mixed cargo and passenger railway line and electrified in 1904 however, the line had open between Thissio and Piraeus (with the first terminal in Neo Faliro) in 1869, becoming the first railway line in Greece. The current station of Line 1 opened on 30 June 1928 by EIS company. The Line 3 extension opened on 10 October 2022. Elliniko Metro plans to undergrounding the section between Piraeus and Faliro stations of Line 1.

=== Piraeus railway station ===
The Station opened on then Ploutonos Street, today's Kallimassioti coast on 30 June 1884 on what was the Piraeus, Athens and Peloponnese line (or SPAP) build to connect In 1920 Hellenic State Railways or SEK was established, however, many railways, such as the SPAP continued to be run as a separate company, becoming an independent company once more two years later.

Due to growing debts, the SPAP came under government control between 1939 and 1940. During the Axis occupation of Greece (1941–44), Athens was controlled by German military forces, and the line was used for the transport of troops and weapons. During the occupation (and especially during the German withdrawal in 1944), the network was severely damaged by both the German army and Greek resistance groups. The track and rolling stock replacement took time following the civil war, with normal service levels resumed around 1948. In 1954 SPAP was nationalized once more. In 1962 the SPAP was amalgamated into SEK. In 1970, OSE became the legal successor to the SEK, taking over responsibilities for most of Greece's rail infrastructure. On 1 January 1971 the station and most of the Greek rail infrastructure were transferred to the Hellenic Railways Organisation S.A., a state-owned corporation. Freight traffic declined sharply when the state-imposed monopoly of OSE for the transport of agricultural products and fertilisers ended in the early 1990s. Many small stations of the network with little passenger traffic were closed down.

In 2001 the infrastructure element of OSE was created, known as GAIAOSE; it would henceforth be responsible for the maintenance of stations, bridges and other elements of the network, as well as the leasing and the sale of railway assists. In 2003, OSE launched "Proastiakos SA", as a subsidiary to serve the operation of the suburban network in the urban complex of Athens during the 2004 Olympic Games. In 2005, TrainOSE was created as a brand within OSE to concentrate on rail services and passenger interface. That same year the station closed, with the last service 7 August 2005, together with the section Piraeus-Agioi Anargyroi of the railway line Athens "Peloponnese Central station-Corinth. After reconstruction, it was reopened as a station of the Athens Suburban Railway on 3 June 2007. Until 2005 it served the rail transport between Piraeus and Piraeus. this was also known informally as the Peloponnese Station. From Piraeus station, a line led to the port of Piraeus, through which freight trains were circulating that performed transhipments between the railway and the ships.

In 2008, the Athens Suburban Railway was transferred to TrainOSE. In 2009, with the Greek debt crisis unfolding OSE's Management was forced to reduce services across the network. Timetables were cutback and routes closed, as the government-run entity attempted to reduce overheads. In 2014 work began to update and expand the station in advance of the introduction of electric trains to this station.

The station is owned by GAIAOSE, which since 3 October 2001 owns most railway stations in Greece: the company was also in charge of rolling stock from December 2014 until October 2025, when Greek Railways (the owner of the Piraeus–Platy railway) took over that responsibility.

== Services ==
Since 22 November 2025, the following services call at the railway station:

- Athens Suburban Railway Line A1 towards Athens Airport (via Metamorfosi), with up to one train per hour;
- Athens Suburban Railway Line A4 towards Kiato, with up to one train per hour.

The surface metro station is served by Athens Metro Line 1 trains towards Kifissia, while the underground station is served by Line 3 trains towards Doukissis Plakentias or Athens Airport to the east, and Dimotiko Theatro to the south.

== Station layout ==
G
Side platform
Platform 5
No regular service
Platform 4
No regular service
Island platform
Platform 3
towards Athens Airport / towards Kiato (Lefka) →
Platform 2
towards Athens Airport / towards Kiato (Lefka) →
Island platform
Platform 1
No regular service
Concourse
- Customer service
- Tickets
- Entry/Exit

EO56 – Kononos Street
G
Side platform
North track
towards Kifissia (Faliro) →
Island platform
South track
towards Kifissia (Faliro) →
Side platform
Concourse
- Customer service
- Tickets
- Entry/Exit
B1
Concourse
- Customer service
- Tickets
B2
Landing
Escalator/stairway landing
B3
Side platform
Northbound
← towards Athens Airport (Maniatika)
Southbound
towards Dimotiko Theatro (Terminus) →
Side platform

== Gallery ==
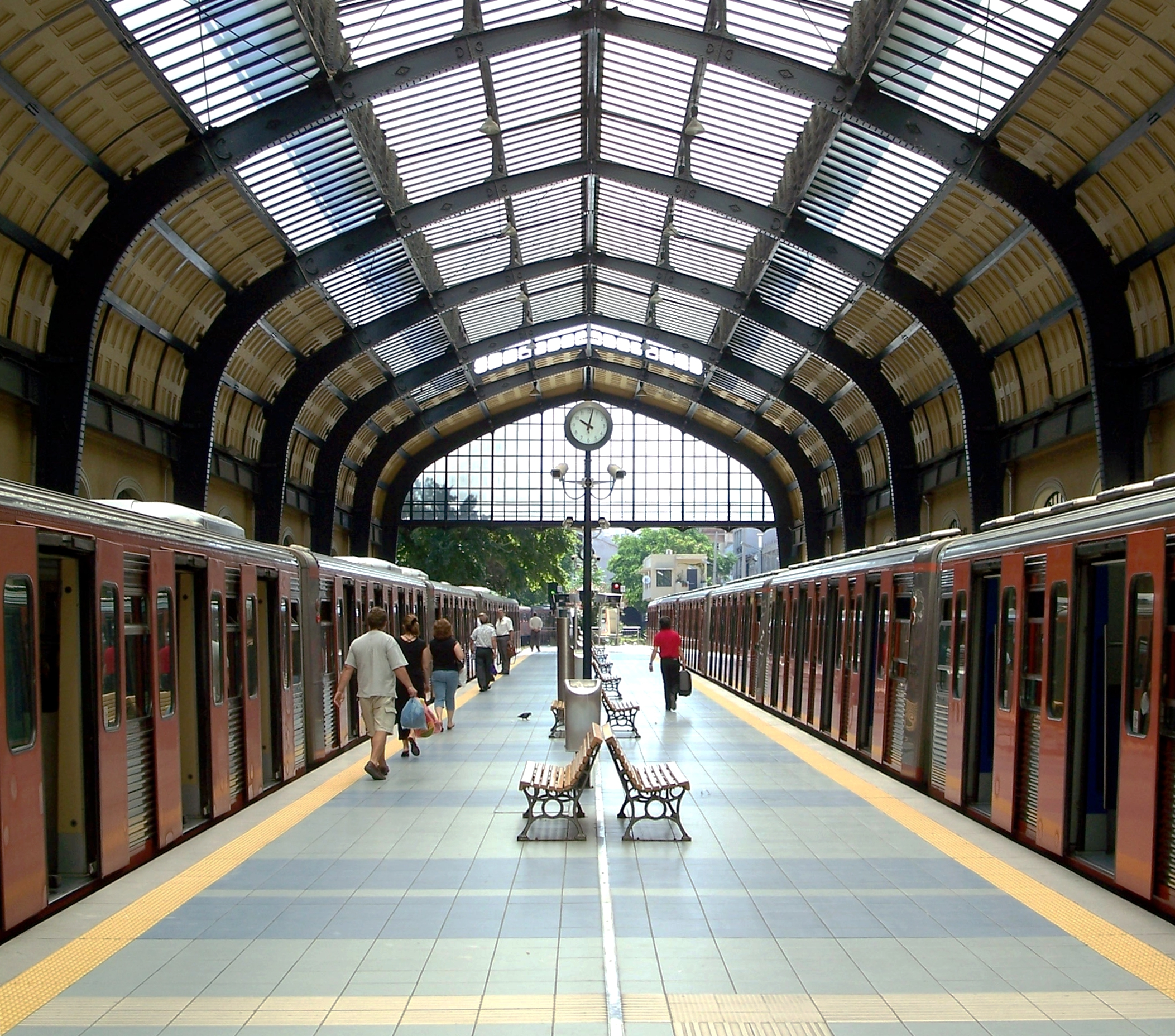
Line 1 platform

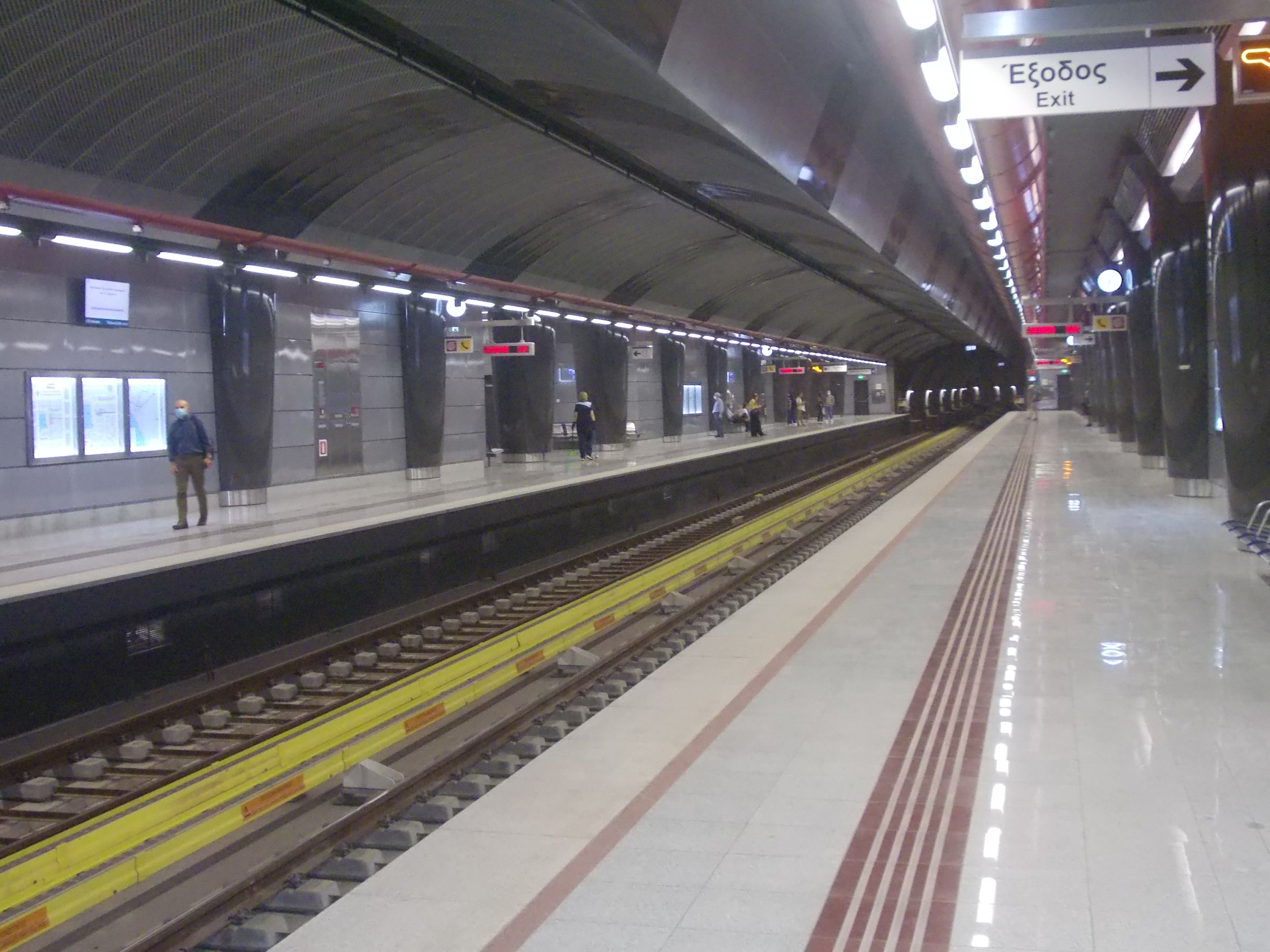
Line 3 platform

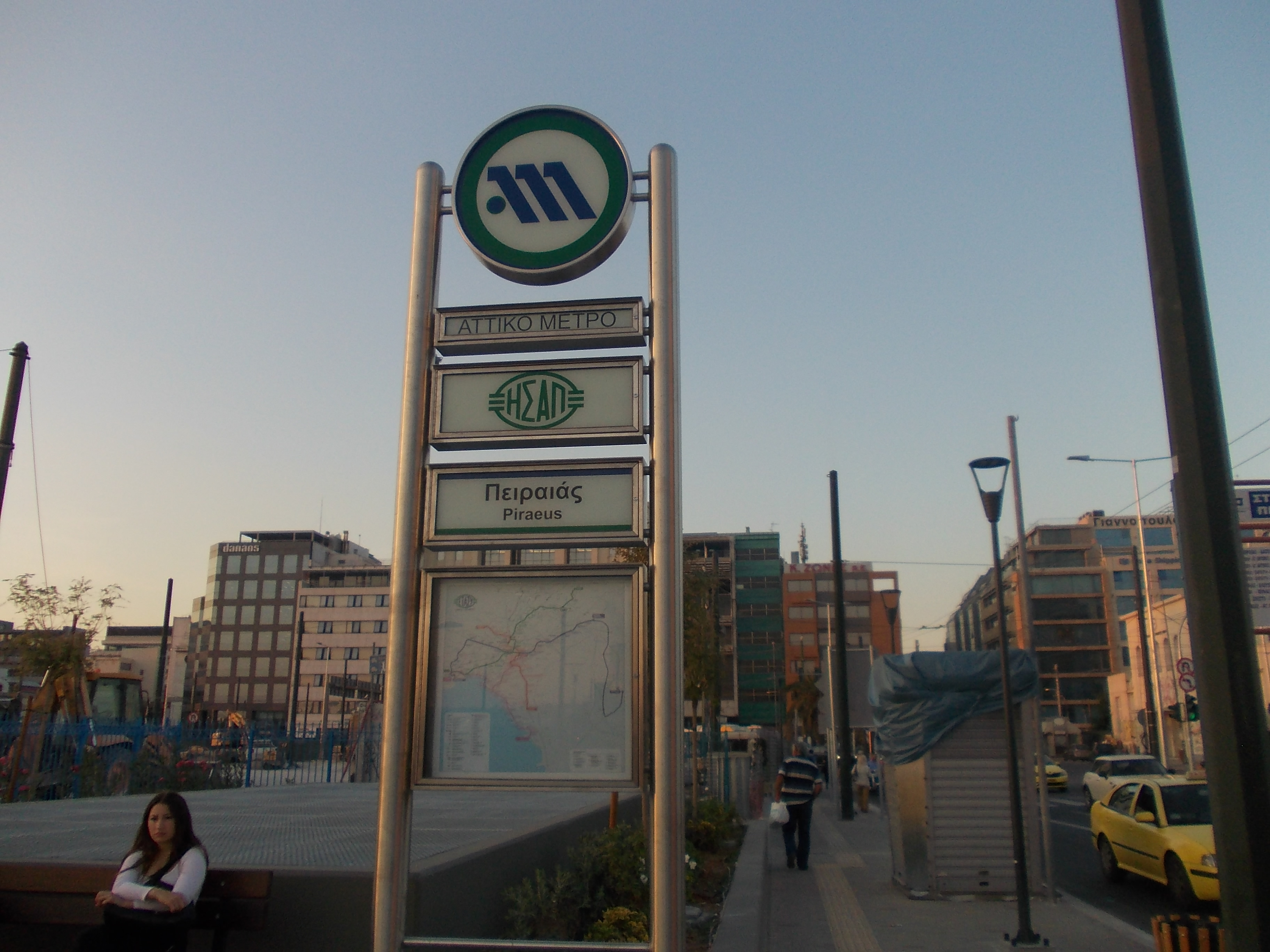
Station's sign at Akti Kallimasioti

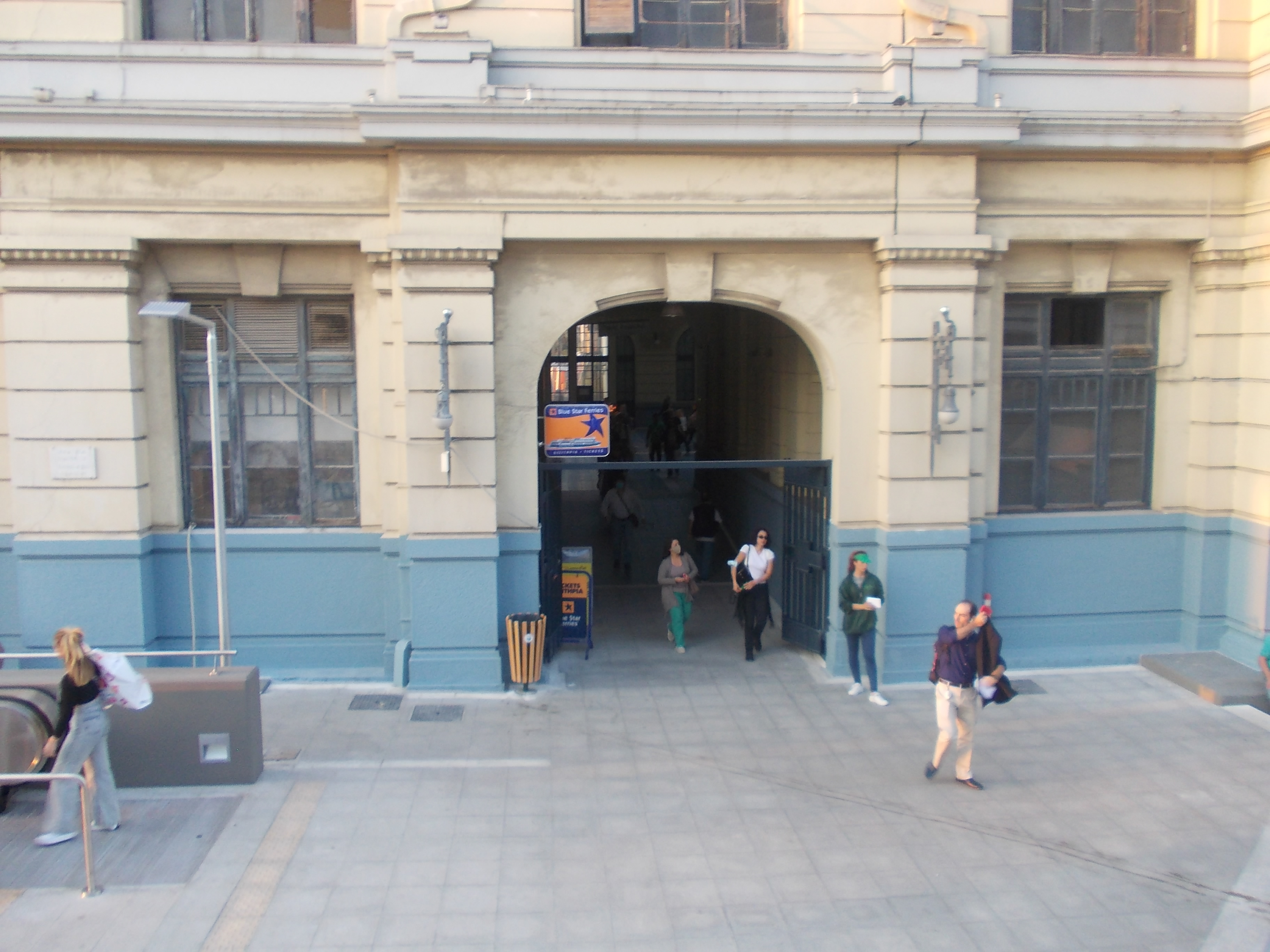
Line 1's entrance at Odissou Sq.

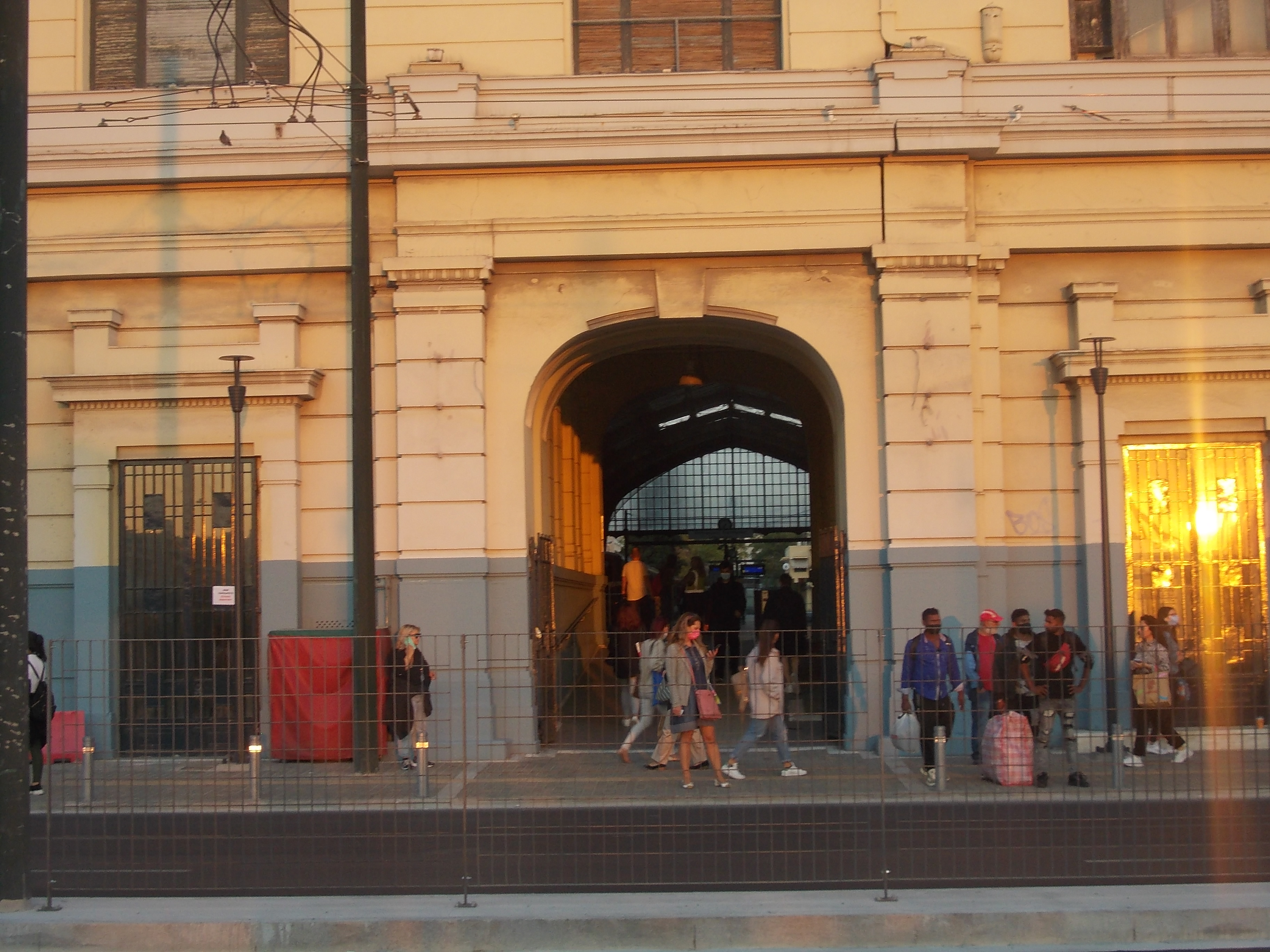
Line 1's entrance at Akti Kallimasioti

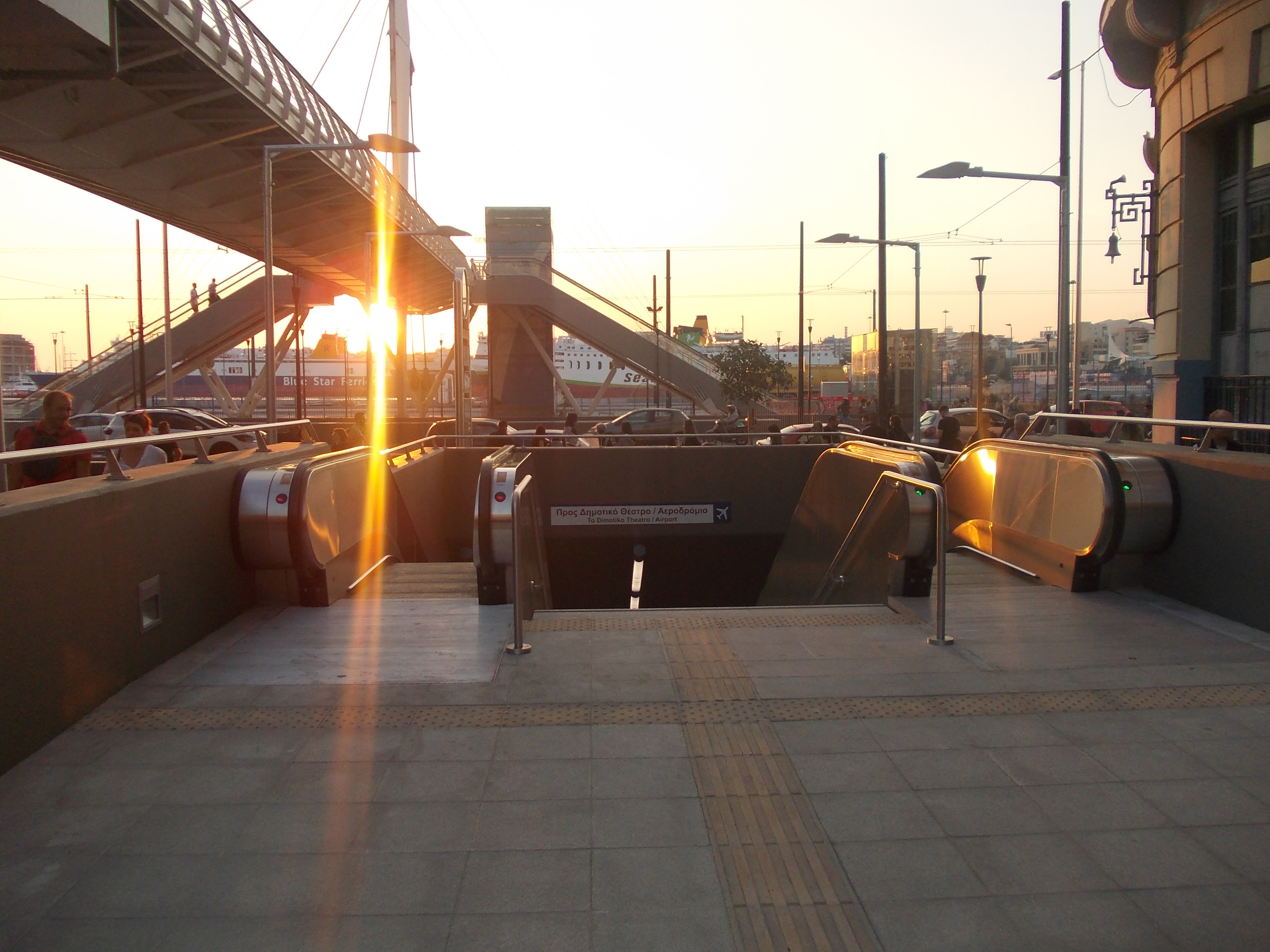
Line 3's entrance at Odissou Sq.

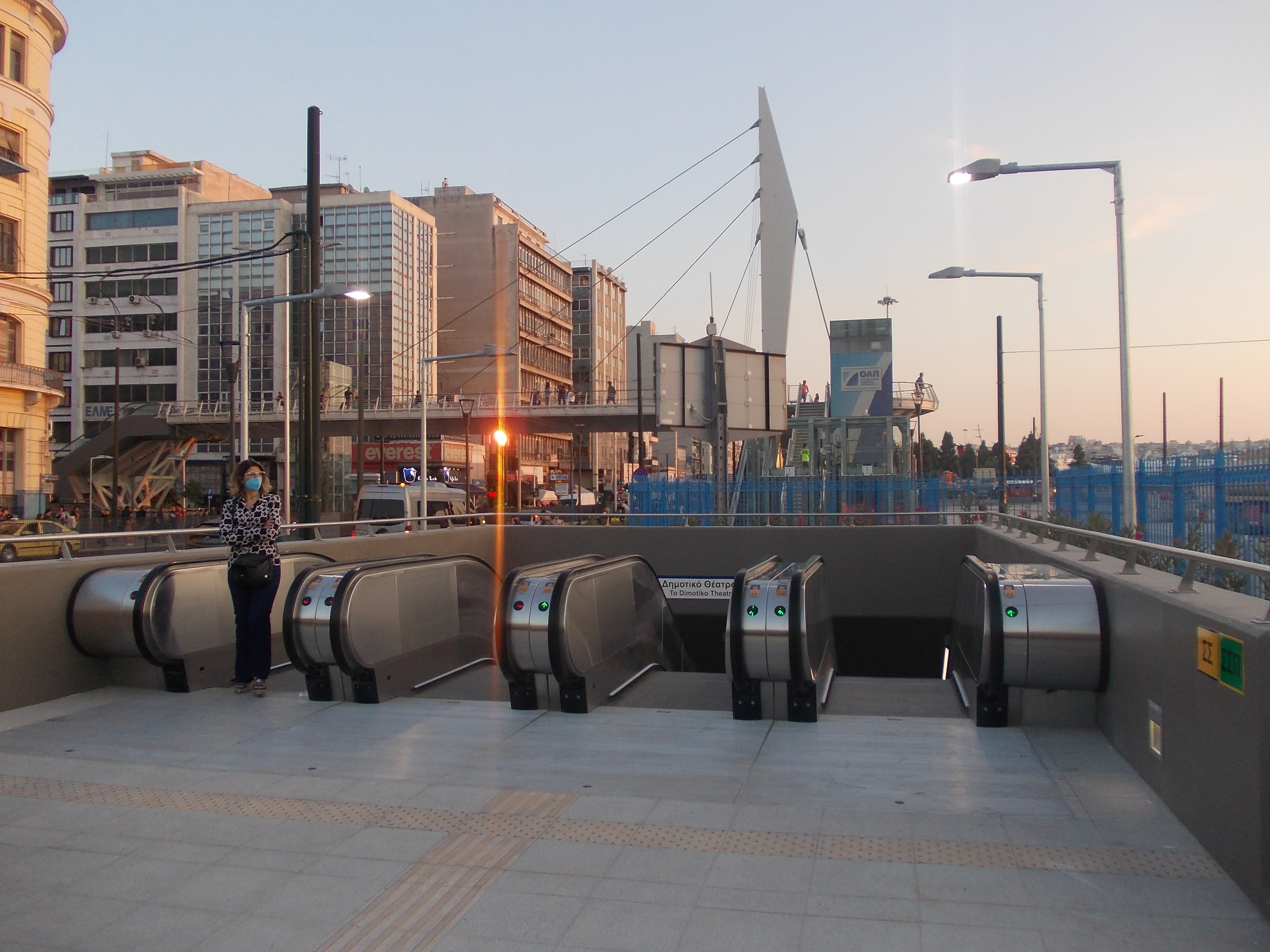
Line 3's entrance at Akti Kallimasioti

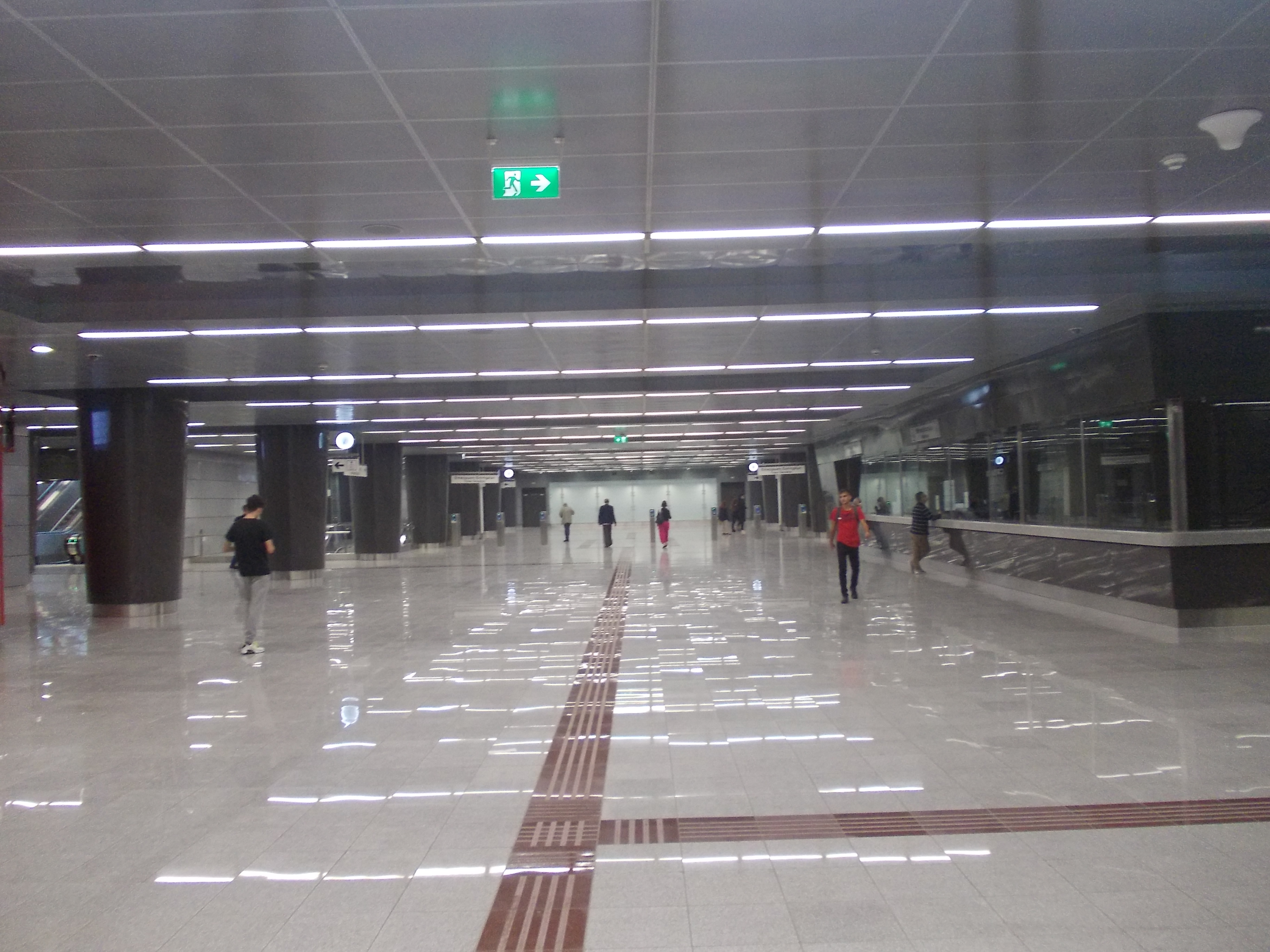
Line 3 station's concourse level

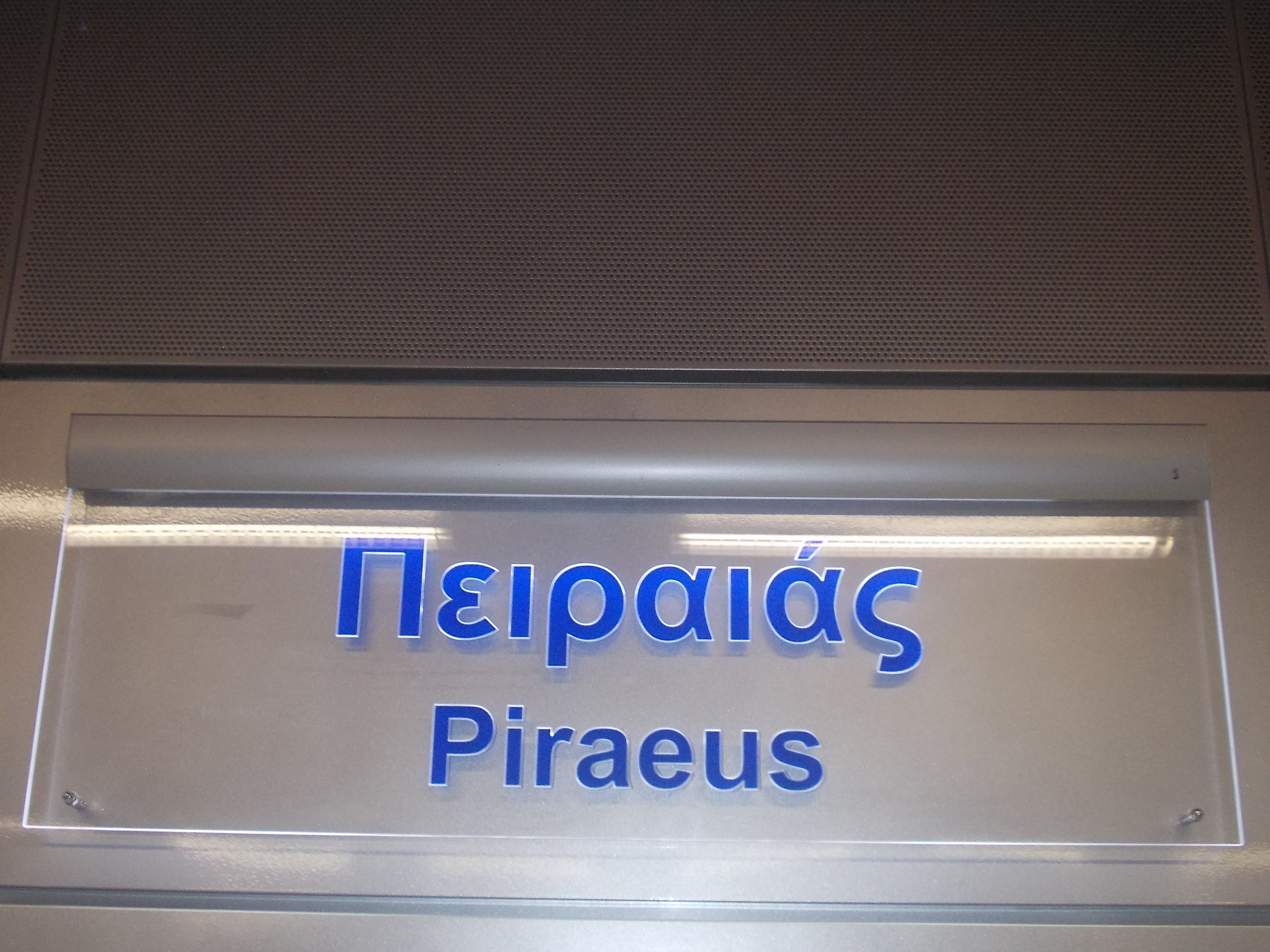
Station's Line 3 platform sign

== See also ==
- Railway stations in Greece
- Hellenic Railways Organization
- Athens-Piraeus Electric Railways
- Hellenic Train
- Proastiakos
- P.A.Th.E./P.
- Piraeus
- Athens railway station
