= Railway stations in Greece =

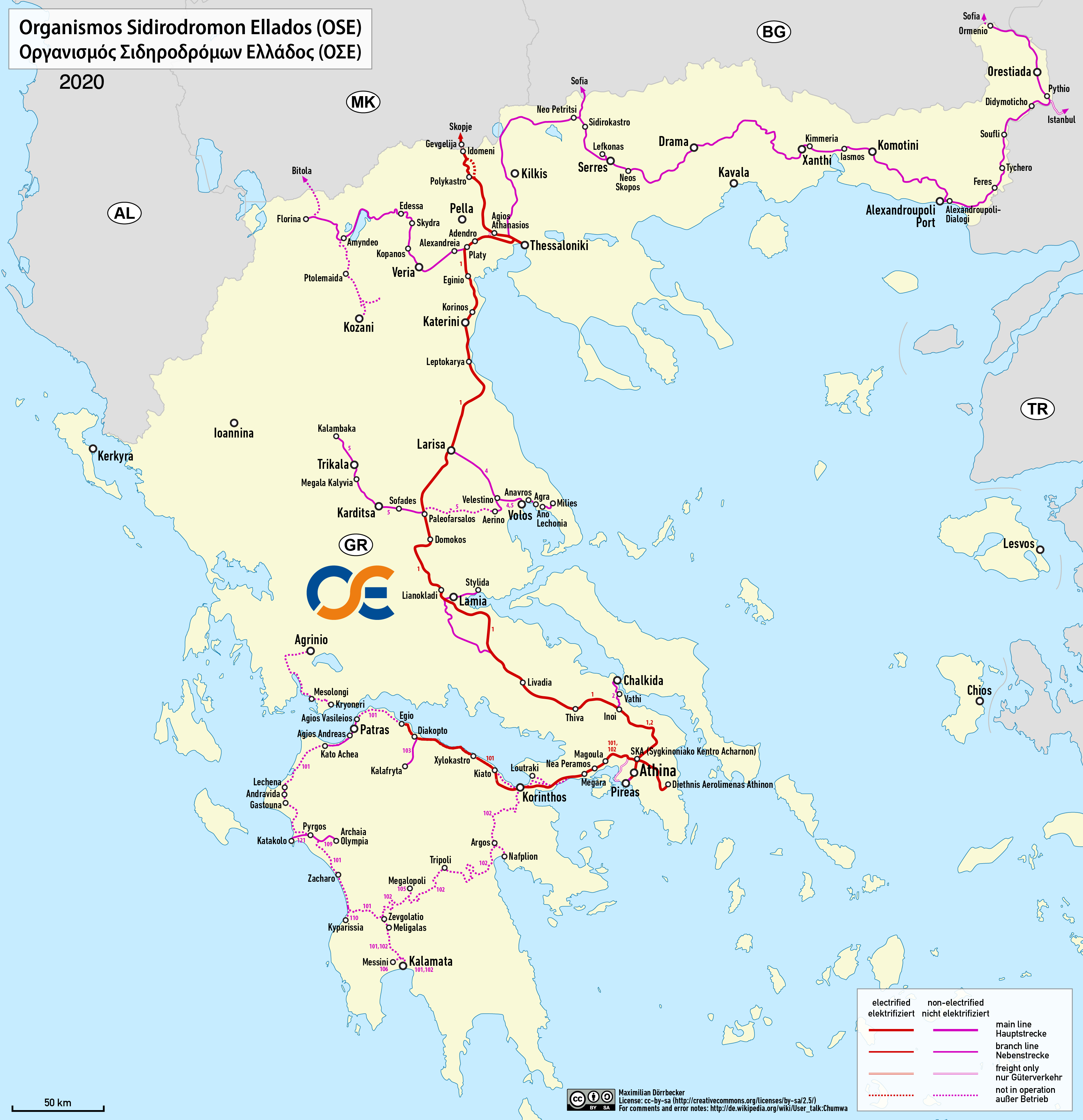
Railway network in Greece: main, secondary, under construction/disused.

This article shows a list of railway stations in Greece. Currently (as of 2025), around 210 railway stations in Greece see a daily rail service. Greek Railways manages and owns all railway stations in Greece, not including metro stations or Athens Airport station, this is the case following the reorganisation and reintegration of GAIAOSE in 2025.

== List of stations ==
| † | Terminal station |
| # | Interchange station |
| × | Under construction |
| Hellenic Train | Local, Regional, Express and Intercity: services |
| Athens Metro | Athens Metro interchange |
| Thessaloniki Metro | Thessaloniki Metro interchange |
| Bus interchange | Local bus interchange |
| Athens Suburban Railway Line A1 | Athens Suburban Railway Line 1 |
| Athens Suburban Railway Line A2 | Athens Suburban Railway Line 2 |
| Athens Suburban Railway Line A3 | Athens Suburban Railway Line 3 |
| Athens Suburban Railway Line A4 | Athens Suburban Railway Line 4 |
| Thessaloniki Regional Railway Line T1 | Thessaloniki Regional Railway Line 1 |
| Thessaloniki Regional Railway Line T2 | Thessaloniki Regional Railway Line 2 |
| Thessaloniki Regional Railway Line T3 | Thessaloniki Regional Railway Line 3 |
| | Patras Suburban Railway Line 1 |
| | Patras Suburban Railway Line 2 |

| # | Station English | Station Greek | Lines | Services | Interchanges | Regional unit | Position |
|---|---|---|---|---|---|---|---|
| 1 | Acharnes | Αχαρνές | Athens–Chalcis | Athens Suburban Railway Line A3 | Bus | East Attica | 38°04′49″N 23°44′38″E |
| 2 | Acharnes Railway Center # | Σιδηροδρομικό Κέντρο Αχαρνών | Ano Liosia–Airport; Athens–Chalcis | Athens Suburban Railway Line A2 Athens Suburban Railway Line A3 | Hellenic Train | East Attica | 38°03′59″N 23°44′12″E |
| 3 | Adendro # | Άδενδρο | Athens–Thessaloniki; Thessaloniki–Bitola | Thessaloniki Regional Railway Line T1 Thessaloniki Regional Railway Line T2 | Hellenic Train | Thessaloniki | 40°38′11″N 22°31′47″E |
| 4 | Afidnes | Αφίδναι | Athens–Chalcis | Athens Suburban Railway Line A3 | | East Attica | 38°11′16″N 23°50′41″E |
| 5 | Agia Marina | | Leianokladi–Stylida | Hellenic Train | | Phthiotis | 38°53′46″N 22°34′58″E |
| 6 | Agioi Anargyroi # | Άγιοι Ανάργυροι | Athens–Thessaloniki | Athens Suburban Railway Line A1 Athens Suburban Railway Line A3 Athens Suburban Railway Line A4 | | West Athens | 38°01′18.5″N 23°43′06.25″E |
| 7 | Agioi Theodoroi | Άγιοι Θεόδωροι | Piraeus–Kiato; Aigio–Airport | Athens Suburban Railway Line A4 | | Corinthia | 37.9331°N 23.1369°E |
| 8 | Agios Andreas # | Άγιος Ανδρέας | Patras–Kyparissia | Hellenic Train | Bus | Patras | 38°08′33″N 21°26′02″E |
| 9 | Agios Georgios | Άγιος Γεώργιος | Athens–Chalcis | Athens Suburban Railway Line A3 | | Boeotia | 38°21′18″N 23°36′26″E |
| 10 | Agios Panteleimonas # | Άγιος Παντελεήμονας | Thessaloniki–Bitola | Thessaloniki Regional Railway Line T2 | Hellenic Train | Florina | 40°48′35″N 21°58′52″E |
| 11 | Agios Stefanos | Athens–Chalcis | Athens Suburban Railway Line A3 | | East Attica | 38°08′25″N 23°51′34″E | |
| 12 | Agios Thomas | Athens–Chalcis | Athens Suburban Railway Line A3 | | Boeotia | 38.27754°N 23.66983°E | |
| 13 | Agyia | Patras–Kyparissia | Hellenic Train | | Achaea | 38.270271°N 21.746045°E | |
| 14 | Aigio † | Aigio–Airport; Aigio–Athens; Aigio–Kiato | Hellenic Train | Bus | Achaea | 38.2400°N 22.1035°E | |
| 15 | Aiginio | Athens–Thessaloniki | Thessaloniki Regional Railway Line T1 | Hellenic Train | Pieria | 40°29′52″N 22°33′08″E | |
| 16 | Akrata | Aigio–Airport; Aigio–Athens; Aigio–Kiato | Hellenic Train | | Achaea | 38°07′56″N 22°26′24″E | |
| 17 | Akrolimni | Thessaloniki–Alexandroupoli | Hellenic Train | | | | |
| 18 | Alalkomenes | Piraeus–Platy | Hellenic Train | | Boeotia | 38°24′30″N 22°58′57″E | |
| 19 | Alexandreia # | Thessaloniki–Bitola | Thessaloniki Regional Railway Line T2 | Hellenic Train | Imathia | 40°37′14″N 22°26′34″E | |
| 20 | Alexandroupoli † | Thessaloniki–Alexandroupoli Alexandroupoli–Svilengrad | Hellenic Train | Hellenic Train | Evros | 40°50′42″N 25°52′45″E | |
| 21 | Aliartos | Piraeus–Platy | Hellenic Train | | Boeotia | 38°22′45″N 23°06′42″E | |
| 22 | Alissos | Patras–Kyparissia | Hellenic Train | | | | |
| 23 | Amfikleia | Piraeus–Platy | Hellenic Train | | Phthiotis | 38°39′31″N 22°35′41″E | |
| 24 | Amyntaio # | Thessaloniki–Bitola | Thessaloniki Regional Railway Line T2 | Hellenic Train | Florina | 40°41′28″N 21°41′08″E | |
| 25 | Ano Liosia † | Piraeus–Kiato; Ano Liosia–Airport; Aigio–Airport | Athens Suburban Railway Line A2 Athens Suburban Railway Line A4 | | West Attica | 38°04′15″N 23°42′36″E | |
| 26 | Antheias | Patras–Kyparissia | Hellenic Train | | | | |
| 27 | Armenio | Larissa–Volos | Hellenic Train | | Larissa | 39°29′03″N 22°41′43″E | |
| 28 | Arnissa # | Thessaloniki–Bitola | Thessaloniki Regional Railway Line T2 | Hellenic Train | Florina | 40°47′53″N 21°50′06″E | |
| 29 | Aspropyrgos | Piraeus–Kiato | Athens Suburban Railway Line A4 | | West Attica | 38°04′51″N 23°36′15″E | |
| 30 | Athens # | Athens–Thessaloniki | Athens Suburban Railway Line A1 Athens Suburban Railway Line A3 Athens Suburban Railway Line A4 | Hellenic Train Athens Metro Athens Metro Line 2 | Central Athens | 37°59′32.24″N 23°43′14″E | |
| 31 | Athens Airport † | Piraeus–Airport; Ano Liosia–Airport; Aigio–Airport | Athens Suburban Railway Line A1 Athens Suburban Railway Line A4 | Athens Metro Athens Metro Line 3 | East Attica | 37.936890°N 23.944700°E | |
| 32 | Avlida | Athens–Chalcis | Athens Suburban Railway Line A3 | | Euboea | 38°24′16″N 23°36′15″E | |
| 33 | Avlona | Athens–Chalcis | Athens Suburban Railway Line A3 | | East Attica | 38.2499°N 23.6956°E | |
| 34 | Bozaitika | Patras–Kyparissia | Hellenic Train | | Achaea | 38°16′53″N 21°45′52″E | |
| 35 | Bralos | Piraeus–Platy | Hellenic Train | | Phthiotis | 38°42′08″N 22°27′28″E | |
| 36 | Chaeronea | Piraeus–Platy | Hellenic Train | | Boeotia | 38°24′30″N 22°58′57″E | |
| 37 | Chalcis † | Athens–Chalcis | Athens Suburban Railway Line A3 | | Euboea | 38°27′46″N 23°35′10″E | |
| 38 | Chersos # | Thessaloniki–Alexandroupoli | Thessaloniki Regional Railway Line T3 | Hellenic Train | Kilkis | 41°05′25″N 22°46′59″E | |
| 39 | Corinth | Piraeus–Kiato; Aigio–Airport; Aigio–Athens | Athens Suburban Railway Line A4 | | Corinthia | 37°55′16″N 22°55′57″E | |
| 40 | Davleia | Piraeus–Platy | Hellenic Train | | Boeotia | 38°32′03″N 22°48′44″E | |
| 41 | Dekeleia | Athens–Chalcis | Athens Suburban Railway Line A3 | | East Attica | 38°05′59″N 23°46′47″E | |
| 42 | Diakopto # | Aigio–Athens; Aigio–Kiato | Hellenic Train | Hellenic Train | Achaea | 38°11′30″N 22°11′52″E | |
| 43 | Didymoteicho | Alexandroupoli–Svilengrad | Hellenic Train | | Evros | 41°13′01″N 26°18′15″E | |
| 44 | Dilesi | Athens–Chalcis | Athens Suburban Railway Line A3 | | Boeotia | 38°20′15″N 23°36′34″E | |
| 45 | Dilofos | Alexandroupoli–Svilengrad | Hellenic Train | | Evros | 41°41′35″N 26°22′41″E | |
| 46 | Dikaia | Alexandroupoli–Svilengrad | Hellenic Train | | Evros | 41.7060°N 26.2974°E | |
| 47 | Doirani # | Thessaloniki–Alexandroupoli | Thessaloniki Regional Railway Line T3 | Hellenic Train | Kilkis | 41°10′22″N 22°46′20″E | |
| 48 | Domokos | Piraeus–Platy | Hellenic Train | | Phthiotis | 39°10′44″N 22°17′12″E | |
| 49 | Doukissis Plakentias # | Piraeus–Airport; Ano Liosia–Airport; Aigio–Airport | Athens Suburban Railway Line A1 Athens Suburban Railway Line A2 | Athens Metro Athens Metro Line 3 | North Athens | 38°01′24.1″N 23°49′59″E | |
| 50 | Drama | Thessaloniki–Alexandroupoli | Hellenic Train | | Drama | 41°08′25″N 24°08′49″E | |
| 51 | Edessa # | Thessaloniki–Bitola | Thessaloniki Regional Railway Line T2 | Hellenic Train | Pella | 40°48′32″N 22°03′06″E | |
| 52 | Eliki | Aigio–Airport; Aigio–Athens; Aigio–Kiato | Hellenic Train | | Achaea | 38°12′57″N 22°08′28″E | |
| 53 | Episkopi | Thessaloniki–Bitola | Thessaloniki Regional Railway Line T2 | | Imathia | 40°41′10″N 22°08′27″E | |
| 54 | Fanari | Palaiofarsalos–Kalambaka | Hellenic Train | | Karditsa | 39°25′01″N 21°49′03″E | |
| 55 | Feres | Alexandroupoli–Svilengrad | Hellenic Train | | Evros | 40°53′28″N 26°11′05″E | |
| 56 | Filakto | Alexandroupoli–Svilengrad | Hellenic Train | | Evros | 41°03′10″N 26°16′46″E | |
| 57 | Florina † | Thessaloniki–Bitola | Thessaloniki Regional Railway Line T2 | | Florina | 40.782079°N 21.415380°E | |
| 58 | Fotolivos | Thessaloniki–Alexandroupoli | Hellenic Train | | | | |
| 59 | Ptelea | Alexandroupoli–Svilengrad | Hellenic Train | | Evros | 41°43′03″N 26°15′13″E | |
| 60 | Gallikos # | Thessaloniki–Alexandroupoli | Thessaloniki Regional Railway Line T3 | Hellenic Train | Kilkis | 40°51′33″N 22°53′04″E | |
| 61 | Gazoros | Thessaloniki–Alexandroupoli | Hellenic Train | | | | |
| 62 | Gorgopotamos | Piraeus–Platy | Hellenic Train | | Phthiotis | 38°30′11″N 22°13′59″E | |
| 63 | Hersos | Thessaloniki–Alexandroupoli | Thessaloniki Regional Railway Line T3 | Hellenic Train | Kilkis | 41°05′25″N 22°46′59″E | |
| 64 | Iasmos | Thessaloniki–Alexandroupoli | Hellenic Train | | | | |
| 65 | Idomeni | Thessaloniki–Skopje | Hellenic Train | | Kilkis | 41°04′17″N 22°18′38″E | |
| 66 | Irakleio | Piraeus–Airport; Ano Liosia–Airport; Aigio–Airport | | | North Athens | 38°03′26″N 23°46′17″E | |
| 67 | Ities | Patras–Kyparissia railway | | | Achaea | 38°12′43″N 21°43′07″E | |
| 68 | Kalambaka † | Palaiofarsalos–Kalambaka railway | Hellenic Train | | Trikala | 39°42′11″N 21°37′31″E | |
| 69 | Kalindria | Thessaloniki–Alexandroupoli | Hellenic Train | | | | |
| 70 | Kalochori-Panteichi | Athens–Chalcis | Athens Suburban Railway Line A3 | | Boeotia | 38°23′23″N 23°35′34″E | |
| 73 | Kalyvia Lamias | Leianokladi–Stylida | Hellenic Train | | Phthiotis | | |
| 72 | Kaminia | Patras–Kyparissia | Hellenic Train | | | | |
| 73 | Kastanies | Alexandroupoli–Svilengrad | Hellenic Train | | Evros | 41.6472867°N 26.4865270°E | |
| 74 | Kastellokampos | Patras–Kyparissia | Hellenic Train | | Achaea | 38°17′28″N 21°46′17″E | |
| 75 | Kato Acharnes | Piraeus–Airport; Piraeus–Kiato | Athens Suburban Railway Line A1 Athens Suburban Railway Line A4 | | West Athens | 38°03′14″N 23°43′57″E | |
| 76 | Kato Achaia | Patras–Kyparissia | | | Achaea | 38°05′04″N 21°20′02″E | |
| 77 | Karditsa | Palaiofarsalos–Kalambaka | Hellenic Train | | Karditsa | 39°21′14″N 21°54′53″E | |
| 78 | Kastanoussa | Thessaloniki–Alexandroupoli | Thessaloniki Regional Railway Line T3 | Hellenic Train | Serres | | |
| 79 | Katerini # | Athens–Thessaloniki | Thessaloniki Regional Railway Line T1 | Hellenic Train | Pieria | 40°16′07″N 22°31′53″E | |
| 80 | Kavyli | Alexandroupoli–Svilengrad | Hellenic Train | | Evros | | |
| 81 | Kefalochori | Thessaloniki–Bitola | Thessaloniki Regional Railway Line T2 | | Imathia | | |
| 82 | Kiato † | Piraeus–Kiato; Aigio–Airport; Aigio–Athens; Aigio–Kiato | Athens Suburban Railway Line A4 | Bus | Corinthia | 38°00′33″N 22°44′19″E | |
| 83 | Kifissos | Piraeus–Platy | Hellenic Train | | Boeotia | 38°35′10″N 22°44′41″E | |
| 84 | Kifisias | Piraeus–Airport; Ano Liosia–Airport; Aigio–Airport | Athens Suburban Railway Line A1 Athens Suburban Railway Line A2 | | North Athens | 38°2′31″N 23°48′12″E | |
| 85 | Kilkis # | Thessaloniki–Alexandroupoli | Thessaloniki Regional Railway Line T3 | Hellenic Train | Kilkis | 40°57′30″N 22°51′25″E | |
| 86 | Kinetta | Piraeus–Kiato | Athens Suburban Railway Line A4 | | West Attica | 37.965366°N 23.201099°E | |
| 87 | Kirki | Thessaloniki–Alexandroupoli | Hellenic Train | | Evros | 40°58′32″N 25°47′52″E | |
| 88 | Komotini | Thessaloniki–Alexandroupoli | Hellenic Train | | Rhodope | 41°06′36″N 25°23′38″E | |
| 89 | Korinos | Athens–Thessaloniki | Thessaloniki Regional Railway Line T1 | Hellenic Train | Pieria | 40°18′58″N 22°34′39″E | |
| 90 | Koropi # | Piraeus–Airport; Ano Liosia–Airport | Athens Suburban Railway Line A1 Athens Suburban Railway Line A2 | Athens Metro Athens Metro Line 3 | East Attica | 37°54′46″N 23°53′45″E | |
| 91 | Kouloura | Thessaloniki–Bitola | Thessaloniki Regional Railway Line T2 | | Imathia | 40.5492381°N 22.3143807°E | |
| 92 | Kranonas | Piraeus–Platy | Hellenic Train | | Larissa | | |
| 93 | Kryoneri ^{×} | Piraeus–Platy | Athens Suburban Railway Line A3 | | East Attica | 38.123095°N 23.830170°E | |
| 94 | Kypseli | Larissa–Volos | Hellenic Train | | Larissa | 39°31′21″N 22°39′12″E | |
| 95 | Lagyna | Alexandroupoli–Svilengrad | Hellenic Train | | Evros | 41°05′10″N 26°18′05″E | |
| 95 | Lamia | Leianokladi–Stylida | Hellenic Train | | Phthiotis | 38°53′46″N 22°26′05″E | |
| 96 | Larissa # | Athens–Thessaloniki | Thessaloniki Regional Railway Line T1 Hellenic Train | Hellenic Train | Larissa | 39°37′46″N 22°25′22″E | |
| 97 | Lefka | Piraeus–Airport; Piraeus–Kiato | Athens Suburban Railway Line A1 Athens Suburban Railway Line A4 | | Piraeus | 37°57′21″N 23°39′16″E | |
| 98 | Lefkothea | Thessaloniki–Alexandroupoli | Hellenic Train | | | | |
| 99 | Leianokladi | Piraeus–Platy; Leianokladi–Stylida | Hellenic Train | Hellenic Train | Phthiotis | 37°57′21″N 23°39′16″E | |
| 100 | Leptokarya | Athens–Thessaloniki | Thessaloniki Regional Railway Line T1 | Hellenic Train | Pieria | 40°03′32″N 22°33′56″E | |
| 101 | Lianovergi | Thessaloniki–Bitola | | Hellenic Train | Imathia | 40°37′49″N 22°30′16″E | |
| 102 | Lilaia | Piraeus–Platy | Hellenic Train | | Phthiotis | 38°40′12″N 22°32′40″E | |
| 103 | Litochoro | Athens–Thessaloniki | Thessaloniki Regional Railway Line T1 | Hellenic Train | Pieria | 40°07′31″N 22°33′01″E | |
| 104 | Livadeia | Piraeus–Platy | Hellenic Train | | Boeotia | 38°28′14″N 22°55′36″E | |
| 105 | Loutros | Thessaloniki–Bitola | Thessaloniki Regional Railway Line T2 | | Imathia | | |
| 106 | Lygia | Aigio–Airport; Aigio–Athens; Aigio–Kiato | Hellenic Train | | Corinthia | 38°04′36″N 22°30′21″E | |
| 107 | Lykoporia | Aigio–Airport; Aigio–Athens; Aigio–Kiato | Hellenic Train | | Achaea | 38°04′36″N 22°30′21″E | |
| 108 | Magoula | Piraeus–Kiato; Aigio–Airport; Aigio–Athens | Athens Suburban Railway Line A4 | | West Attica | 38°04′25″N 23°31′46″E | |
| 109 | Magoula Karditsa | Palaiofarsalos–Kalambaka | Hellenic Train | | Karditsa | 39°27′07″N 21°47′18″E | |
| 110 | Megara | Piraeus–Kiato; Aigio–Airport; Aigio–Athens | Athens Suburban Railway Line A4 | | West Attica | 37°59′28″N 23°21′40″E | |
| 111 | Mandhraki | Thessaloniki–Alexandroupoli | Thessaloniki Regional Railway Line T3 | Hellenic Train | Serres | | |
| 112 | Mandra | Alexandroupoli–Svilengrad | Hellenic Train | | Evros | | |
| 113 | Marasia | Alexandroupoli–Svilengrad | Hellenic Train | | Evros | 41°40′08″N 26°28′12″E | |
| 114 | Megali Vrysi | Leianokladi–Stylida | Hellenic Train | | Phthiotis | 38°53′40″N 22°28′27″E | |
| 115 | Mesi | Thessaloniki–Bitola | Thessaloniki Regional Railway Line T2 | | Imathia | | |
| 116 | Mesti | Thessaloniki–Alexandroupoli | Hellenic Train | | Evros | | |
| 117 | Metalliko | Thessaloniki–Alexandroupoli | Thessaloniki Regional Railway Line T3 | Hellenic Train | Kilkis | 41°01′10″N 22°48′11″E | |
| 118 | Metamorfosi | Piraeus–Airport; Ano Liosia–Airport | Athens Suburban Railway Line A1 Athens Suburban Railway Line A2 | | North Athens | 39°37′07″N 22°24′26″E | |
| 119 | Mezourlo | Piraeus–Platy | Hellenic Train | | Larissa | 38°03′36″N 23°45′23″E | |
| 120 | Molos | Athens–Kalambaka | Hellenic Train | | Phthiotis | 38°48′44″N 22°39′27″E | |
| 121 | Mouries # | Thessaloniki–Alexandroupoli | Thessaloniki Regional Railway Line T3 | Hellenic Train | Kilkis | | |
| 122 | Naousa # | Thessaloniki–Bitola | Thessaloniki Regional Railway Line T2 | Hellenic Train | Imathia | | |
| 123 | Nea Filadelfeia # | Thessaloniki–Alexandroupoli | Thessaloniki Regional Railway Line T3 | Hellenic Train | Thessaloniki | 40°47′48″N 22°50′56″E | |
| 124 | Nea Peramos | Aigio–Piraeus | Athens Suburban Railway Line A4 | | West Attica | 38°00′46″N 23°24′51″E | |
| 125 | Nea Vyssa | Alexandroupoli–Svilengrad | Hellenic Train | | Evros | 41°34′43″N 26°32′04″E | |
| 126 | Neo Chori | Thessaloniki–Alexandroupoli | Hellenic Train | | | | |
| 127 | Neo Petritsi # | Thessaloniki–Alexandroupoli | Thessaloniki Regional Railway Line T3 | Hellenic Train | Serres | 41°16′12″N 23°17′52″E | |
| 128 | Neoi Poroi # | Athens–Thessaloniki | Thessaloniki Regional Railway Line T1 | Hellenic Train | Pieria | 39°53′59″N 22°36′53″E | |
| 129 | Nikiforos | Thessaloniki–Alexandroupoli | Hellenic Train | | Drama | 41°10′04″N 24°18′42″E | |
| 130 | Neratziotissa # | Piraeus–Airport; Ano Liosia–Airport; Aigio–Airport | Athens Suburban Railway Line A1 Athens Suburban Railway Line A2 | Athens Metro Athens Metro Line 1 | North Athens | 38.045120°N 23.792945°E | |
| 131 | Oinofyta | Athens–Chalcis | Athens Suburban Railway Line A3 | | Boeotia | 38.30690°N 23.63376°E | |
| 132 | Oinoi # | Ano Liosia–Airport | Athens Suburban Railway Line A3 | Hellenic Train | Boeotia | 38°19′21″N 23°36′34″E | |
| 133 | Olympia † | Katakolo-Olympia | Hellenic Train | | Elis | 37°38′44″N 21°37′35″E | |
| 134 | Omalo Thrakis | Thessaloniki–Alexandroupoli | Thessaloniki Regional Railway Line T3 | Hellenic Train | Serres | | |
| 135 | Orestiada | Alexandroupoli–Svilengrad | Hellenic Train | | Evros | 41°30′11″N 26°32′14″E | |
| 136 | Orfana | Ano Liosia–Airport | Hellenic Train | | Karditsa | 39°24′12″N 22°13′41″E | |
| 137 | Ormenio † | Alexandroupoli–Svilengrad | Hellenic Train | | Evros | 41°43′42″N 26°12′44″E | |
| 138 | Pagrati | Leianokladi–Stylida | Hellenic Train | | Phthiotis | | |
| 139 | Paiania–Kantza # | Piraeus–Airport; Ano Liosia–Airport | Athens Suburban Railway Line A1 Athens Suburban Railway Line A2 | Athens Metro Athens Metro Line 3 | East Attica | 37°59′03″N 23°52′12″E | |
| 140 | Pallini # | Piraeus–Airport; Ano Liosia–Airport | Athens Suburban Railway Line A1 Athens Suburban Railway Line A2 | Athens Metro Athens Metro Line 3 | East Attica | 38°00′19″N 23°52′11″E | |
| 141 | Panachaiki | Patras–Kyparissia | Hellenic Train | | Achaea | 38°15′44″N 21°44′32″E | |
| 142 | Paralia | Patras–Kyparissia | Hellenic Train | | | | |
| 143 | Parori | Piraeus–Platy | Hellenic Train | | Boeotia | 38°34′28″N 22°45′43″E | |
| 144 | Paranesti | Thessaloniki–Alexandroupoli | Hellenic Train | | Drama | 41°09′21″N 24°18′02″E | |
| 145 | Patras | Piraeus–Patras railway and Patras–Kyparissia railway | | | Achaea | 38°14′59″N 21°44′06″E | |
| 146 | Pedino # | Thessaloniki–Alexandroupoli | Thessaloniki Regional Railway Line T3 | Hellenic Train | Kilkis | | |
| 147 | Pentelis | Piraeus–Airport; Ano Liosia–Airport | Athens Suburban Railway Line A1 Athens Suburban Railway Line A2 | | North Athens | 38°02′0″N 23°49′19″E | |
| 148 | Peplos | Alexandroupoli–Svilengrad railway | Hellenic Train | | Evros | 40°57′34″N 26°16′36″E | |
| 149 | Petrades | Alexandroupoli–Svilengrad | Hellenic Train | | Evros | 41°20′20″N 26°36′40″E | |
| 150 | Petrea | Thessaloniki–Bitola | Thessaloniki Regional Railway Line T2 | | Pella | | |
| 151 | Piraeus † | Piraeus–Airport; Piraeus–Kiato | Athens Suburban Railway Line A1 Athens Suburban Railway Line A4 | Athens Metro Athens Metro Line 1 Athens Metro Line 3 | Piraeus | | |
| 152 | Platania | Thessaloniki–Alexandroupoli | Hellenic Train | | | | |
| 153 | Platanos | Aigio–Kiato | Hellenic Train | | Achaea | 38°07′56″N 22°26′24″E | |
| 154 | Platy # | Athens–Thessaloniki; Thessaloniki–Bitola | Thessaloniki Regional Railway Line T1 Thessaloniki Regional Railway Line T2 | Hellenic Train | Imathia | 40°38′11″N 22°31′47″E | |
| 155 | Polyantho | Thessaloniki–Alexandroupoli | Hellenic Train | | | | |
| 156 | Polysitos | Thessaloniki–Alexandroupoli | Hellenic Train | | | | |
| 157 | Praggio | Alexandroupoli–Svilengrad | Hellenic Train | | Evros | | |
| 158 | Pyrgos Vasilissis | Piraeus–Airport; Piraeus–Kiato | Athens Suburban Railway Line A1 Athens Suburban Railway Line A4 | | West Athens | 38°02′22″N 23°43′39″E | |
| 159 | Pythio | Alexandroupoli–Svilengrad | Hellenic Train | | Evros | 41°22′13″N 26°37′19″E | |
| 160 | Rigio | Alexandroupoli–Svilengrad | Hellenic Train | Bus | Evros | 41°23′53″N 26°35′29″E | |
| 161 | Rio † | Patras–Kyparissia | | Bus | Achaea | 38°18′03″N 21°46′56″E | |
| 162 | Rentis | Piraeus–Airport; Piraeus–Kiato | Athens Suburban Railway Line A1 Athens Suburban Railway Line A4 | | Piraeus | 37°57′45″N 23°40′07″E | |
| 163 | Rouf | Piraeus–Airport; Piraeus–Kiato | Athens Suburban Railway Line A1 Athens Suburban Railway Line A4 | | Central Athens | 37°58′26″N 23°42′13″E | |
| 164 | Rapsani | Athens–Thessaloniki | Thessaloniki Regional Railway Line T1 | Hellenic Train | Larissa | 39°53′59″N 22°36′53″E | |
| 165 | Revenia | Leianokladi–Stylida | Hellenic Train | | Phthiotis | | |
| 166 | Roditsa | Leianokladi–Stylida | Hellenic Train | | Phthiotis | 38°53′42″N 22°27′26″E | |
| 167 | Rodopolis # | Thessaloniki–Alexandroupoli | Thessaloniki Regional Railway Line T3 | Hellenic Train | Serres | 41°15′33″N 22°59′57″E | |
| 168 | Sakkos | Alexandroupoli–Svilengrad | Hellenic Train | | Evros | | |
| 169 | Serres # | Thessaloniki–Alexandroupoli | Thessaloniki Regional Railway Line T3 | Hellenic Train | Serres | 41°02′33″N 23°19′16″E | |
| 170 | Sfendali | Athens–Chalcis | Athens Suburban Railway Line A3 | | East Attica | 38°14′08″N 23°47′04″E | |
| 171 | Sidirochori | Thessaloniki–Alexandroupoli | Hellenic Train | | | | |
| 172 | Sidirokastro # | Thessaloniki–Alexandroupoli | Thessaloniki Regional Railway Line T3 | Hellenic Train | Serres | 41°08′04″N 23°13′56″E | |
| 173 | Sindos # | Athens–Thessaloniki; Thessaloniki–Bitola | Thessaloniki Regional Railway Line T1 Thessaloniki Regional Railway Line T2 | Hellenic Train | Thessaloniki | 40°40′27″N 22°48′20″E | |
| 174 | Sitaria | Thessaloniki–Bitola | Hellenic Train | | | | |
| 175 | Skotoussa | Thessaloniki–Alexandroupoli | Thessaloniki Regional Railway Line T3 | Hellenic Train | Serres | | |
| 176 | Skydra # | Thessaloniki–Bitola | Thessaloniki Regional Railway Line T2 | Hellenic Train | Pella | 40°27′38″N 22°05′34″E | |
| 177 | Sofades | Palaiofarsalos–Kalambaka | Hellenic Train | | Karditsa | 39°12′09″N 21°03′04″E | |
| 178 | Sofiko | Alexandroupoli–Svilengrad | Hellenic Train | | Evros | | |
| 179 | Soufli | Alexandroupoli–Svilengrad | Hellenic Train | | Evros | 41°11′15″N 26°18′06″E | |
| 180 | Stavroupoli | Thessaloniki–Alexandroupoli | Hellenic Train | | | | |
| 181 | Stefanovikeio | Larissa–Volos | Hellenic Train | | Magnesia | 39°27′17″N 22°42′42″E | |
| 182 | Struma # | Thessaloniki–Alexandroupoli | Thessaloniki Regional Railway Line T3 | Hellenic Train | Serres | | |
| 183 | Strymonas | Thessaloniki–Alexandroupoli | Hellenic Train | | Serres | 41°09′15″N 23°12′15″E | |
| 184 | Sykorrachi | Thessaloniki–Alexandroupoli | Hellenic Train | | Evros | 41°09′15″N 23°12′15″E | |
| 185 | Tanagra | Piraeus–Platy | Hellenic Train | | Boeotia | 38°20′24″N 23°34′53″E | |
| 186 | Tavros | Piraeus–Airport; Piraeus–Kiato | Athens Suburban Railway Line A1 Athens Suburban Railway Line A4 | | South Athens | 37°58′08″N 23°41′37″E | |
| 187 | Thebes # | Athens–Thessaloniki | Hellenic Train | Hellenic Train | Boeotia | 38°19′47″N 23°19′06″E | |
| 188 | Thessaloniki # | Athens–Thessaloniki; Thessaloniki–Bitola | Thessaloniki Regional Railway Line T1 Thessaloniki Regional Railway Line T2 Thessaloniki Regional Railway Line T3 | Hellenic Train Thessaloniki Metro Thessaloniki Metro Line 1 | Thessaloniki | 40°38′40″N 22°55′46″E | |
| 189 | Thourio | Alexandroupoli–Svilengrad | Hellenic Train | | Evros | | |
| 190 | Tithorea | Piraeus–Platy | Hellenic Train | | Phthiotis | 38°36′30″N 22°43′07″E | |
| 191 | Toxotes | Thessaloniki–Alexandroupoli | Hellenic Train | | | | |
| 192 | Trikala | Palaiofarsalos–Kalambaka | Hellenic Train | | Trikala | 39°32′43″N 21°45′50″E | |
| 193 | Tsaousi - Mintilogli | Patras–Kyparissia | Hellenic Train | | | | |
| 194 | Tsoukalaika | Patras–Kyparissia | Hellenic Train | | | | |
| 195 | Tychero | Alexandroupoli–Svilengrad | Hellenic Train | | Evros | 40°53′28″N 26°11′05″E | |
| 196 | Vasiliki | Leianokladi–Stylida | Hellenic Train | | Phthiotis | 38°54′33″N 22°36′06″E | |
| 197 | Velestino | Larissa–Volos | Hellenic Train | | Magnesia | 39°23′24″N 22°45′35″E | |
| 198 | Venna | Thessaloniki–Alexandroupoli | Hellenic Train | | | | |
| 199 | Vevi # | Thessaloniki–Bitola | Thessaloniki Regional Railway Line T2 | Hellenic Train | Florina | 40°46′25″N 21°34′03″E | |
| 200 | Volos † | Larissa–Volos | Hellenic Train | | Magnesia | 39.3651°N 22.9366°E | |
| 201 | Vrachneika | Patras–Kyparissia | Hellenic Train | | Achaea | 38.165526°N 21.672020°E | |
| 202 | Vyroneia # | Thessaloniki–Alexandroupoli | Thessaloniki Regional Railway Line T3 | Hellenic Train | Serres | 41.1544°N 23.1517°E | |
| 203 | Xanthi | Thessaloniki–Alexandroupoli | Hellenic Train | | Xanthi | 41°07′26″N 24°53′33″E | |
| 204 | Xechasmeni # | Thessaloniki–Bitola | Thessaloniki Regional Railway Line T2 | Hellenic Train | Imathia | 40°33′48″N 22°20′15″E | |
| 204 | Cheimonio | Alexandroupoli–Svilengrad | Hellenic Train | | Evros | 41°27′00″N 26°33′21″E | |
| 206 | Xino Nero | Thessaloniki–Bitola | Hellenic Train | | | | |
| 207 | Xylokastro | Aigio–Kiato | Hellenic Train | | Corinthia | 38°04′36″N 22°36′34″E | |
| 208 | Ypsilantis | Piraeus–Platy | Hellenic Train | | Boeotia | 38°22′45″N 23°06′42″E | |
| 209 | Zefyri | Piraeus–Kiato | Athens Suburban Railway Line A4 | | West Athens | 38°04′11″N 23°43′02″E | |
| 210 | Zevgolatio | Piraeus–Kiato; Aigio–Athens | Athens Suburban Railway Line A4 | | Corinthia | 37°55′34″N 22°48′20″E | |
