= Agios Georgios railway station =

Άγιος Γεώργιος Agios Georgios

General information
- Location: near Schimatari; Boeotia; Greece
- Coordinates: 38°21′18″N 23°36′26″E
- Owner: GAIAOSE
- Operator: Hellenic Train
- Line: Oinoi–Chalcis railway
- Platforms: 2 (Split)
- Tracks: 1

Construction
- Structure type: at-grade
- Platform levels: 1
- Parking: Yes (3)
- Cycle facilities: No
- Accessible: Yes

Other information
- Status: Unstaffed
- Website: http://www.ose.gr/en/

Key dates
- 8 March 1904: Line opened
- 6 April 2005: Station opened
- 30 July 2017: Line electrified

Services
Preceding station	Suburban Rail	Following station
Dilesi towards Athens	Line A3	Kalochori-Panteichi towards Chalcis
Location

Agios Georgios railway station (Greek: Σιδηροδρομικός Σταθμός Αγίου Γεωργίου, romanized: Sidirodromikos stathmos Agiou Georgiou) is a railway halt east of Schimatari, a town in Boeotia, Greece. GAIAOSE owns the station, but services are provided by Hellenic Train's Athens Suburban Railway between Athens and Chalcis.

== History ==
The station opened on 6 April 2005 as an unstaffed intermediate station on the Athens to Chalcis line. That same year TrainOSE was created as a brand within OSE to concentrate on rail services and passenger interface. In 2008, all Athens Suburban Railway services were transferred from OSE to TrainOSE.

The station is owned by GAIAOSE, which since 3 October 2001 owns most railway stations in Greece: the company was also in charge of rolling stock from December 2014 until October 2025, when Greek Railways (the owner of the Oinoi–Chalcis railway) took over that responsibility.

== Facilities ==
The station is little more than a halt, with only a small car park; however, there are ramps and thus disabled access.

== Services ==
Since 22 November 2025, the following weekday services call at this station:

- Athens Suburban Railway Line A3 between Athens and Chalcis, with up to one train every two hours, plus one extra train during the weekday afternoon peak.

== Station layout ==
Ground level		Exit
Level; Ε1	Side platform, doors will open on the right/left
Level; Ε1	Platform 1Α	→ to Athens (Kalochori-Pantichi) →
Level; Ε1	platform 1Β	← to Chalcis (Dilesi)

== See also ==
- Railway stations in Greece
- Hellenic Railways Organization
- Hellenic Train
- Proastiakos
