= Agios Stefanos railway station =

Station on the Proastiakos railway of Athens, Greece

Άγιος Στέφανος Agios Stefanos
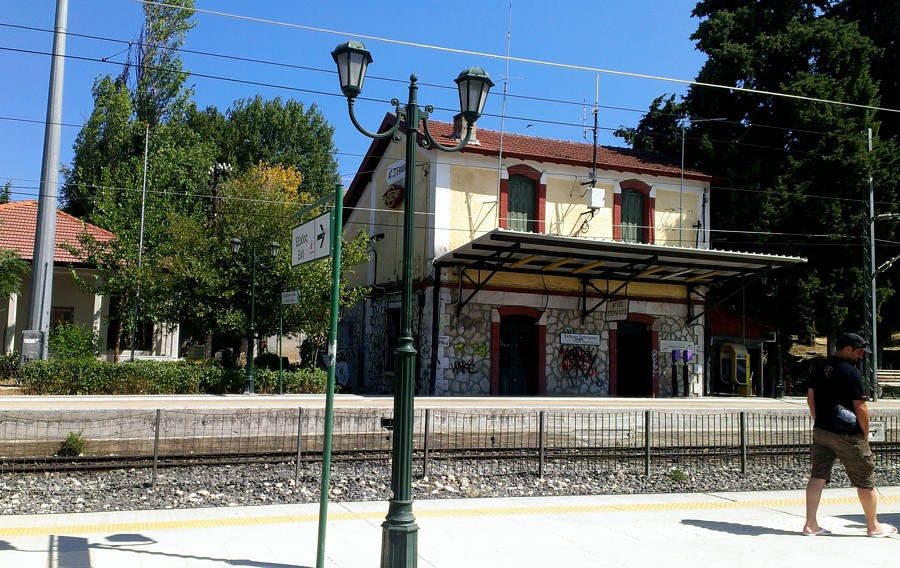
- The old Agios Stefanos station building on eastbound platform, August 2013

General information
- Location: Agios Stefanos, 145 65, Dionysos; East Attica; Greece
- Coordinates: 38°08′25″N 23°51′34″E
- Owner: GAIAOSE
- Operator: Hellenic Train
- Line: Piraeus–Platy railway
- Platforms: 2
- Tracks: 2

Construction
- Structure type: at-grade
- Parking: Yes
- Cycle facilities: No
- Accessible: Yes

Other information
- Status: Unstaffed (as of 2021)
- Website: http://www.ose.gr/en/

History
- Former names: Bogiati/Vogiati; Oion (before 1981)

Key dates
- 8 March 1904: Opened
- 6 May 2005: Rebuilt
- 30 July 2017: Electrified

Services
| Preceding station | Suburban Rail | Following station |
|---|---|---|
| Dekeleia towards Athens | Line A3 | Afidnes towards Chalcis |
Location

Agios Stefanos railway station (Greek: Σιδηροδρομικός Σταθμός Αγίου Στεφάνου, romanized: Sidirodromikós Stathmós Agíou Stefánou) is a station on the Piraeus–Platy railway line in the northern part of the Athens metropolitan area, in the municipal unit of Agios Stefanos of the municipality of Dionysos, East Attica, Greece. It was inaugurated on 8 March 1904 and reopened on 6 May 2005. It is owned by GAIAOSE, however, services are provided by Hellenic Train, through the Athens Suburban Railway from Athens to Chalcis. The station was the setting for 1954 Greek film Neither Cat nor Damage, starring Vasilis Logothetidis.

== History ==
The Station opened on 8 March 1904, as Bogiati railway station (Greek: Σιδηροδρομικός σταθμός Μπογιάτι, romanized: Sidirodromikós stathmós Bogiati) or as Vogiati railway station (Greek: Σιδηροδρομικός σταθμός Βογιάτι, romanized: Sidirodromikós stathmós Vogiati), the information is not that clear, in what was then the Central Greece on what was a branch line of the Piraeus, Demerli & Frontiers Railway. The name derived from a common name of the settlement of Agios Stefanos. In 1920 the station and most of the standard gauge railways in Greece came under the control of the Hellenic State Railways (SEK). It was renamed to Oion railway station (Greek: Σιδηροδρομικός σταθμός Οίον, romanized: Sidirodromikós stathmós Oion) at some point during this period. In 1924 the settlement's name was changed to Agios Stefanos, however the railway station continued to be called Oion

During the Axis occupation of Greece (1941–44), Athens was controlled by German military fourses, and the line used for the transport of troops and weapons. During the occupation (and especially during German withdrawal in 1944), the network was severely damaged by both the German army and Greek resistance groups. The track and rolling stock replacement took time following the civil war, with normal service levels resumed around 1948. The station (then still known as Oion railway station) was the cinematic setting for "Thymaria train station" in the 1954 Greek film Neither Cat nor Damage, starring Vasilis Logothetidis. In 1970 OSE became the legal successor to the SEK, taking over responsibilities for most of Greece's rail infrastructure. On 1 January 1971 the station, and most of the Greek rail infrastructure was transferred to the Hellenic Railways Organisation S.A., a state-owned corporation. The line was converted to diesel sometime before 1990. The station was remanded to Agios Stefanos 1 August 1981. Freight traffic declined sharply when the state-imposed monopoly of OSE for the transport of agricultural products and fertilisers ended in the early 1990s. Many small stations of the network with little passenger traffic were closed down.

In 2001 the infrastructure element of OSE was created, known as GAIAOSE, it would henceforth be responsible for the maintenance, of stations, bridges and other elements of the network, as well as the leasing and the sale of railway assists. In 2003, OSE launched "Proastiakos SA", as a subsidiary to serve the operation of the suburban network in the urban complex of Athens during the 2004 Olympic Games. In 2005, TrainOSE was created as a brand within OSE to concentrate on rail services and passenger interface. In 2008, all Athens Suburban Railway services were transferred from OSE to TrainOSE. The station was reopened on 6 May 2005. The following year its name changed again to its current form in 2006.

In 2009, with the Greek debt crisis unfolding OSE's Management was forced to reduce services across the network. Timetables were cutback and routes closed, as the government-run entity attempted to reduce overheads. In 2017 OSE's passenger transport sector was privatised as TrainOSE, currently, a wholly owned subsidiary of Ferrovie dello Stato Italiane infrastructure, including stations, remained under the control of OSE. That same year on 30 July Line 3 of the Athens Suburban Railway began serving the station.

The station is owned by GAIAOSE, which since 3 October 2001 owns most railway stations in Greece: the company was also in charge of rolling stock from December 2014 until October 2025, when Greek Railways (the owner of the Piraeus–Platy railway) took over that responsibility.

== Facilities ==
The ground-level station is accessed via stairs or a ramp. It has two side platforms, with the main station buildings located on the eastbound platform, these are however now inaccessible and partially rundown, with access to the platforms via stairs or lifts. The Station is housed in the original stone-built station, which is closed. A cafe 'The Station' is located in an adjacent building. At platform level, there are sheltered seating and Dot-matrix display departure and arrival screens and timetable poster boards on both platforms. There is a large car park next to the westbound platforms, open from 06:00-19:30 daily. Outside the station, there is a bus stop where the local call.

== Services ==
=== Suburban rail services ===
Since 22 November 2025, the following weekday services call at this station:

- Athens Suburban Railway Line A3 between Athens and Chalcis, with up to one train every two hours, plus one extra train during the weekday afternoon peak.

=== Bus ===
The station is also served by local and regional buses:

Transport for Athens operates Lines 509, 535 & 535 A

== Future ==
In 2006, plans were published to expand Line 1 (previously the Athens–Piraeus Electric Railways) of the Athens Metro from Kifisia to Agios Stefanos. Since that date, however little progress has been made on these proposals.

== Station layout ==
| L Ground/Concourse | Customer service | Tickets/Exits |
| Level; L1 | Side platform, doors will open on the right |
| Level; L1 | Platform 1 | ← to Chalcis (Afidnes) |
| Level; L1 | Platform 2 | to Athens (Dekeleia) → |
| Level; L1 | Side platform, doors will open on the right |

== Gallery ==
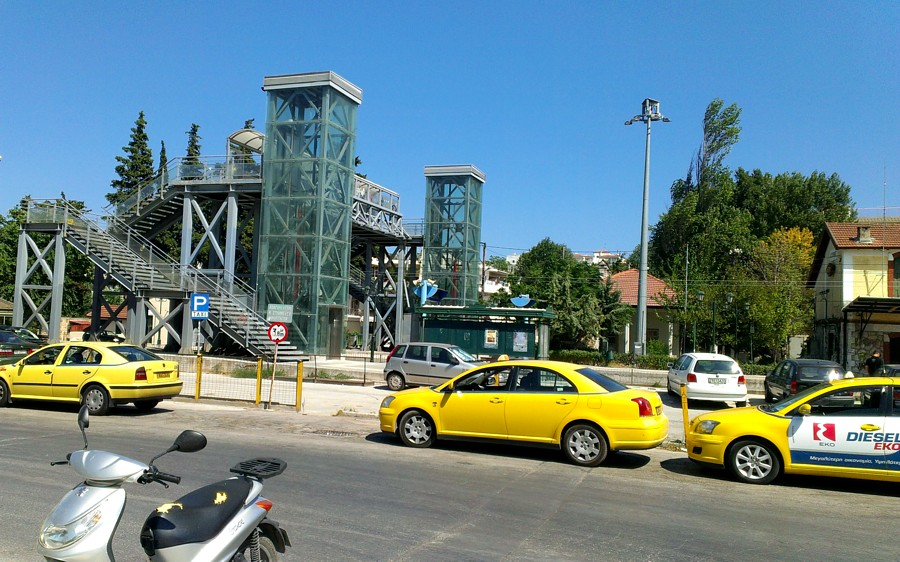
View of the station in 2013, with the new lifts in view.

== See also ==
- Railway stations in Greece
- Hellenic Railways Organization
- Hellenic Train
- Proastiakos
- P.A.Th.E./P.
