= Kalochori-Panteichi =

Kalochori-Panteichi Καλοχώρι-Παντείχι
- Community
- Location within Greece
- Coordinates: 38°23′N 23°36′E
- Country: Greece
- Administrative region: Central Greece
- Regional unit: Euboea
- Municipality: Chalcis
- Municipal unit: Avlida

Population (2021)
  - Community: 764
- Time zone: UTC+2 (EET)
  - Summer (DST): UTC+3 (EEST)
- Vehicle registration: ΧΑ

Kalochori-Panteichi (Greek: Καλοχώρι-Παντείχι) is a village in Euboea regional unit, Greece. Since the 2011 local government reform it is part of the municipality Chalcis. The population was 764 inhabitants at the 2021 census. Although part of the Euboea regional unit, it is not located on the island Euboea, but on the mainland, attached to the northeastern part of Boeotia.

== Transport ==
The village is severed by the Kalochori-Panteichi railway station, with Suburban Railway services to Chalcis and Athens.
