= Oinoi, Boeotia =

Oinoi Οινόη
- Settlement
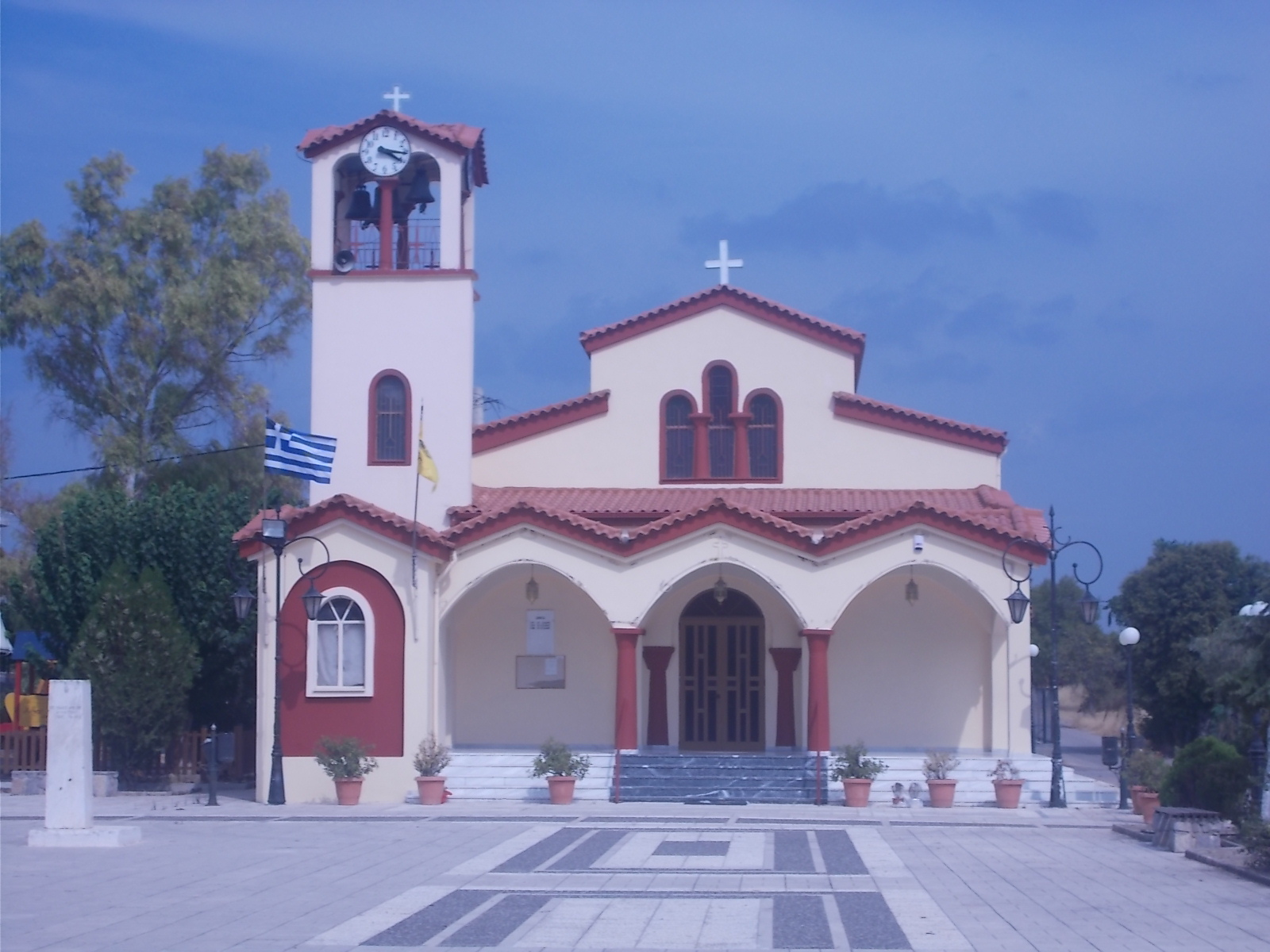
- Analipsi Church in Oinoi

- Location within Greece
- Coordinates: 38°19′N 23°37′E
- Country: Greece
- Administrative region: Central Greece
- Regional unit: Boeotia
- Municipality: Tanagra
- Municipal unit: Schimatari
- Community: Schimatari
- Elevation: 134 m (440 ft)

Population (2021)
  - Total: 855
- Time zone: UTC+2 (EET)
  - Summer (DST): UTC+3 (EEST)
- Vehicle registration: ΒΙ

Oinoi (Greek: Οινόη) is a village in Boeotia, Greece. Since the 2011 local government reform it is part of the municipality Tanagra, and the municipal unit of Schimatari. Population 855 (2021). It is situated in the wide valley of the river Asopos, at 6 km from the South Euboean Gulf coast. It is situated about 3 km southeast of Schimatari, 26 km east of Thebes and 41 km north-northwest of Athens.

== Transport ==
=== Road ===
The A1 motorway (Athens - Lamia - Thessaloniki) passes northeast of Oinoi.

=== Rail ===
The village is served by Oinoi railway station, just west of the town on the Piraeus–Platy line and Athens-Chalcis line (the Oinoi–Chalcis line), with frequent service in both directions.

=== Air ===
The Hellenic Air Force's Tanagra Airport lies to the northwest.

== Population ==
Year	Population
1991	430
2001	396
2011	442
2021	855
