= Dilesi railway station =

Railway station in Boeotia, Greece

Δήλεσι Dilesi

General information
- Location: 320 09 Schimatari; Boeotia; Greece
- Coordinates: 38°20′15″N 23°36′34″E
- Owner: GAIAOSE
- Operator: Hellenic Train
- Line: Oinoi–Chalcis railway
- Platforms: 2 (Split)
- Tracks: 1

Construction
- Structure type: at-grade
- Accessible: Yes

Other information
- Status: Unstaffed
- Website: http://www.ose.gr/en/

Key dates
- 8 March 1904: Line opened
- 6 April 2005: Station opened
- 30 July 2017: Line electrified

Services
Preceding station	Suburban Rail	Following station
Oinoi towards Athens	Line A3	Agios Georgios towards Chalcis
Location

Dilesi railway station (Greek: Σιδηροδρομικός σταθμός Δήλεσι, romanized: Sidirodromikós stathmós Dílesi) is a railway station outside the town of Dilesi, in Boeotia, Greece. It is owned by OSE, but service are provided by Hellenic Train, through the Athens Suburban Railway from Athens to Chalcis.

== History ==
The station opened on 6 April 2005. That same year TrainOSE was created as a brand within OSE to concentrate on rail services and passenger interface. In 2008, all Athens Suburban Railway services were transferred from OSE to TrainOSE. In 2014 a disabled ramp was installed to improve access to the platforms. In July 2022, the station began being served by Hellenic Train, the rebranded TrainOSE.

The station is owned by GAIAOSE, which since 3 October 2001 owns most railway stations in Greece: the company was also in charge of rolling stock from December 2014 until October 2025, when Greek Railways (the owner of the Oinoi–Chalcis railway) took over that responsibility.

== Services ==
Since 22 November 2025, the following weekday services call at this station:

- Athens Suburban Railway Line A3 between Athens and Chalcis, with up to one train every two hours, plus one extra train during the weekday afternoon peak.

== Station layout ==
Ground level		Exit
Level; Ε1	Side platform, doors will open on the right/left
Level; Ε1	Platform 1Α	→ to Athens (Agios Georgios) →
Level; Ε1	platform 1Β	← to Chalcis (Oinoi)
