= Kalochori-Panteichi railway station =

Καλοχώρι-Παντείχι Kalochori-Panteichi

General information
- Location: Kalochori-Panteichi 341 00; Euboea; Greece
- Coordinates: 38°23′23″N 23°35′34″E
- Owner: GAIAOSE
- Operator: Hellenic Train
- Line: Oinoi–Chalcis railway
- Platforms: 2 (Split)
- Tracks: 1

Construction
- Structure type: at-grade
- Accessible: Yes

Other information
- Website: http://www.ose.gr/en/

Key dates
- 8 March 1904: Line opened
- 6 April 2005: Station opened
- 30 July 2017: Line electrified

Services
Preceding station	Suburban Rail	Following station
Agios Georgios towards Athens	Line A3	Avlida towards Chalcis
Location

Kalochori-Panteichi (Greek: Καλοχώρι-Παντείχι) is a halt, in Euboea, Greece. The station serves the village of Kalochori-Panteichi. It is owned by OSE, but service are provided by Hellenic Train, through the Athens Suburban Railway from Athens to Chalcis.

== History ==
The station opened on 6 April 2005 as an unstaffed intermediate station on the Athens to Chalcis service of the Athens Suburban Railway. That same year TrainOSE was created as a brand within OSE to concentrate on rail services and passenger interface. In 2008, all Athens Suburban Railway services were transferred from OSE to TrainOSE.

The station is owned by GAIAOSE, which since 3 October 2001 owns most railway stations in Greece: the company was also in charge of rolling stock from December 2014 until October 2025, when Greek Railways (the owner of the Oinoi–Chalcis railway) took over that responsibility.

== Facilities ==
The station is an unstaffed halt, with few facilities, aside from two small shelters with seating. There is no cafe or shop on-site. At platform level, there are sheltered seating but no Dot-matrix display departure, arrival screens or public address (PA) systems; however, timetable poster boards on both platforms are available. The A1 motorway passes west of the station; however, there are no car parking facilities or drop-off capability.

== Services ==
Since 22 November 2025, the following weekday services call at this station:

- Athens Suburban Railway Line A3 between Athens and Chalcis, with up to one train every two hours, plus one extra train during the weekday afternoon peak.

== Station layout ==
Ground level		Exit
Level; Ε1	Side platform, doors will open on the right/left
Level; Ε1	Platform 1Α	→ to Athens (Avlida) →
Level; Ε1	platform 1Β	← to Chalcis (Agios Georgios)

== See also ==
- Railway stations in Greece
- Hellenic Railways Organization
- Hellenic Train
- Proastiakos
