= Oinoi–Chalcis railway =

Railway line in Greece

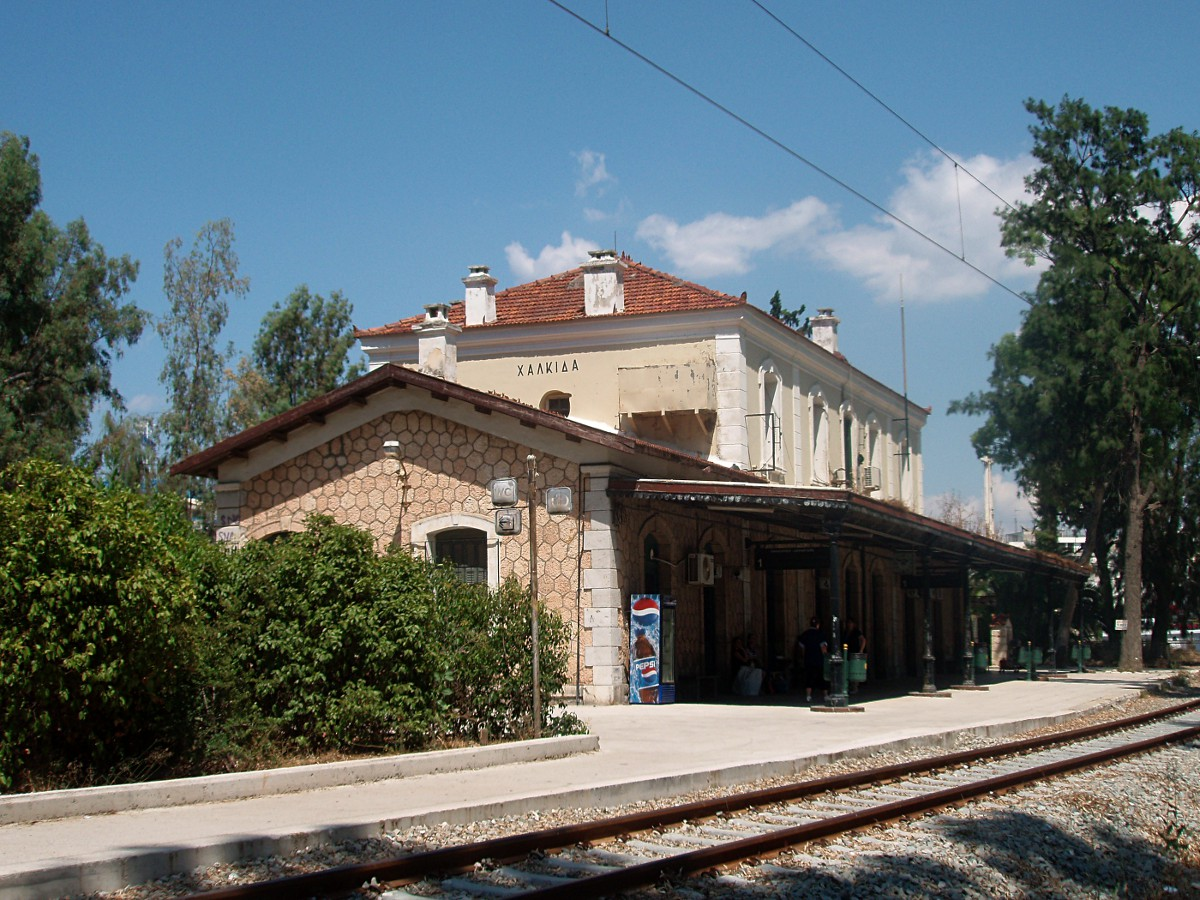
- Chalcis railway station in June 2001.

Overview
- Status: Operational
- Owner: GAIAOSE
- Locale: Central Greece, Greece
- Termini: Oinoi 38°19′21″N 23°36′34″E; Chalcis 38°27′46″N 23°35′10″E
- Stations: 6

Service
- Type: railway line
- Services: Athens Suburban Railway
- Operator(s): Hellenic Train

History
- Opened: 8 March 1904; 121 years ago

Technical
- Line length: 21.69 km (13.48 mi)
- Number of tracks: Single
- Track gauge: 1,435 mm (4 ft 8 1/2 in) standard gauge
- Electrification: 25 kV AC
- Operating speed: 120 km/h (75 mph) (maximum)

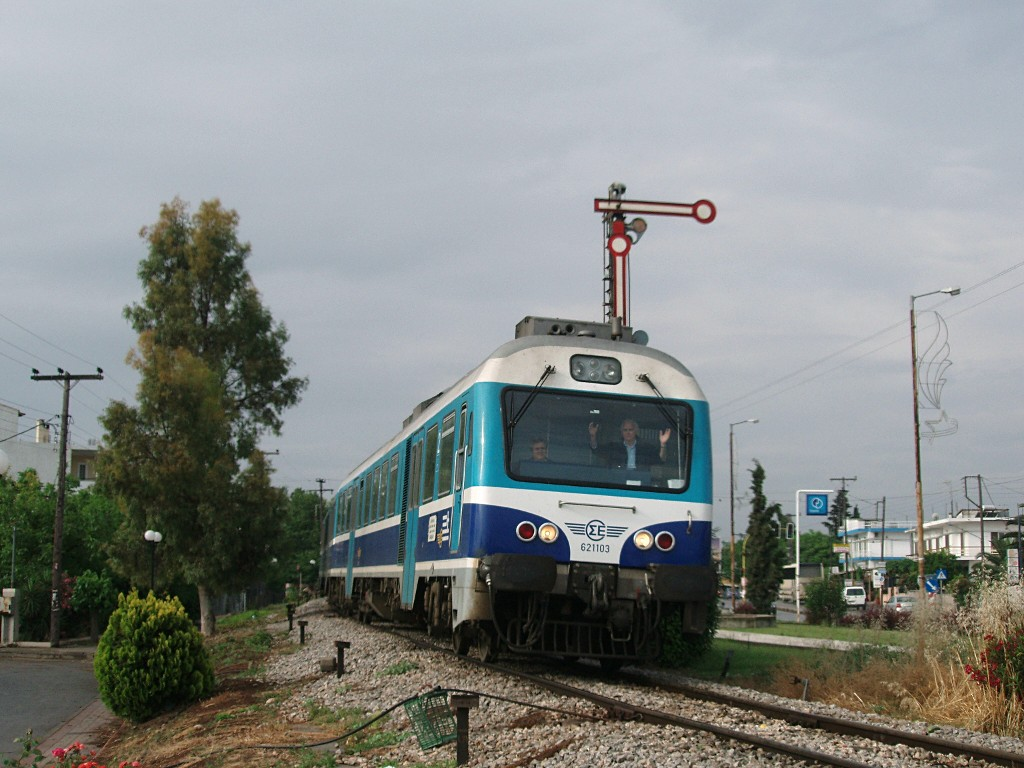
A MAN-2000 DMU train leaves Avlis station towards Chalkis in 2007

The Oinoi–Chalcis railway is an 21.69-kilometre-long (13.48 mi) railway line that connects Oinoi (Boeotia) with Chalcis, capital of Euboea in Greece. It is one of the most important railway lines in Central Greece. Its southern terminus is Oinoi, where there are connections to Athens and Thessaloniki.

== Route ==
The southern terminus of the Oinoi-Chalkida line is Oinoi railway station in Oinoi, Boeotia. It is separated from the Athens-Thessaloniki line and follows a branch of approximately 22 kilometres (14 mi). It passes through Kalochori-Panteichi, continuing via Avlida, proceeding north before turning right and ending in Chalcis, in Chalcis, west of the Euripus Strait. The journey time between Athens and Chalcis is around 1 hour and 19 minutes.

== Stations ==
The stations on the line are

- Oinoi railway station (connecting to Athens, Thessaloniki)
- Dilesi railway station
- Agios Georgios railway station
- Kalochori-Panteichi railway station
- Avlida railway station
- Chalcis railway station

== History ==
The Oinoi–Chalcis railway line was opened on 8 March 1904. Construction of the line had been authorized in 1889 by the law AΨΜΕ / 7-4-1889 concerning the construction and operation of the Piraeus-Larissa and Border railway line, but it was started only in 1902 after the foundation of Hellenic State Railways. The inauguration of the line took place on 6 March 1904, along with the construction of the first 121 kilometres (75 mi) of the line, when an official dinner for 400 people was given on the premises of Chalcis railway station, with the presence of three warships, one British, one French and one Greek. The line opened to the traffic two days later on 8 March 1904.

== Services ==
Line A3 of the Athens Suburban Railway operates on the railway, between Athens and Chalcis via Oinoi, calling at all stations except Pyrgos Vasilissis and Kato Acharnes.
