= Dekeleia railway station =

Station on the Athens Suburban Railway

Δεκέλεια Dekeleia
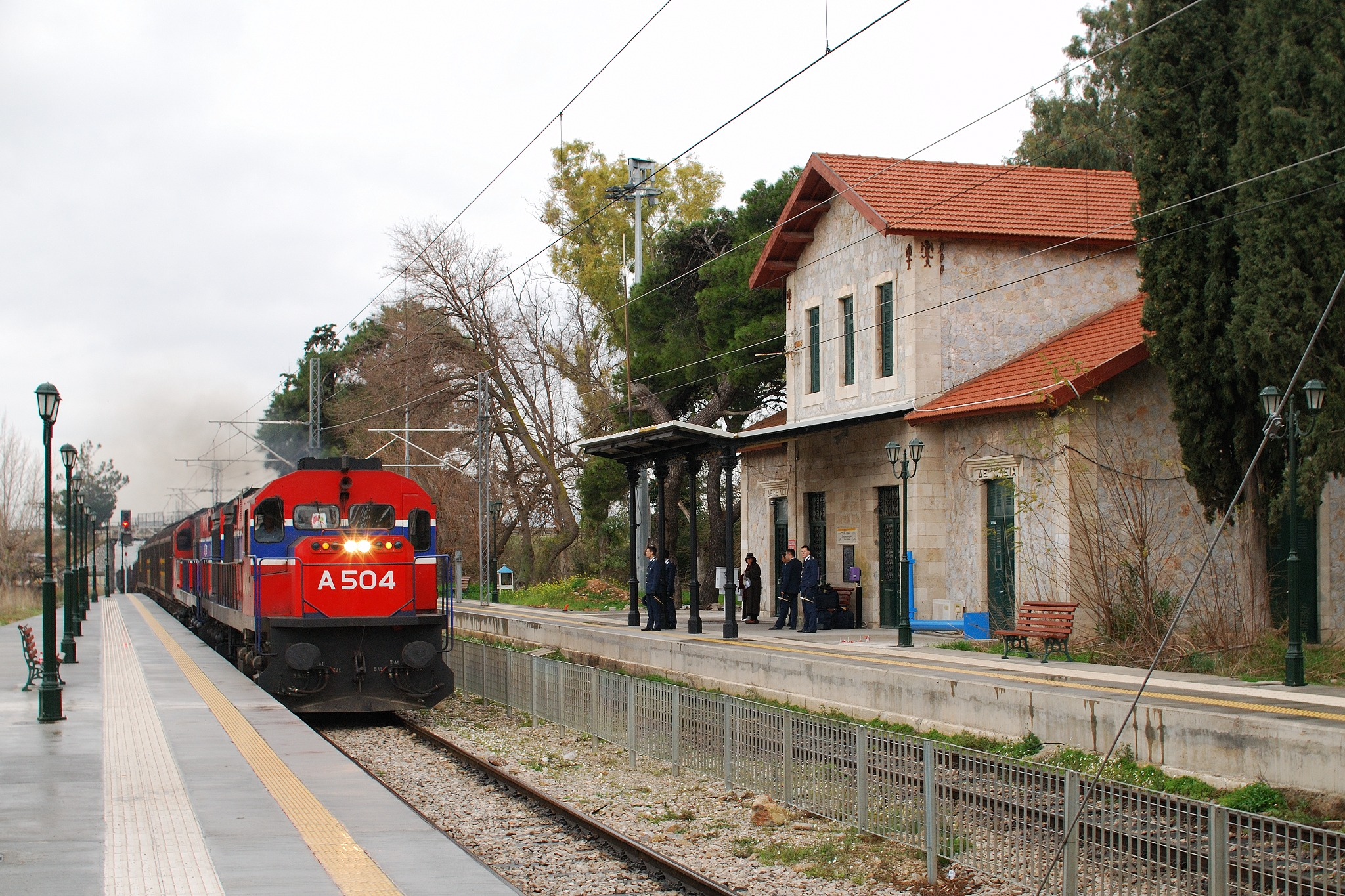
- OSE MLW diesel locomotive A-504 with freight train 80506 passes Dekelia station northbound, January 2009.

General information
- Location: 136 77 Acharnes; Greece
- Coordinates: 38°05′59″N 23°46′47″E
- Owner: GAIAOSE
- Operator: Hellenic Train
- Line: Piraeus–Platy railway
- Platforms: 2
- Tracks: 2

Construction
- Structure type: at-grade
- Platform levels: 1
- Parking: 20 Spaces
- Cycle facilities: No
- Accessible: Yes

Other information
- Status: Staffed
- Website: http://www.ose.gr/en/

History
- Former names: Tatoi

Key dates
- 8 March 1904: Opened
- 6 May 2005: Rebuilt
- 30 July 2017: Electrified

Services
| Preceding station | Suburban Rail | Following station |
|---|---|---|
| Acharnes towards Athens | Line A3 | Agios Stefanos towards Chalcis |
Location

Dekeleia railway station (Greek: Σιδηροδρομικός Σταθμός Δεκελείας, Sidirodromikos Stathmos Dekeleias) is a station on the Piraeus–Platy railway line in the northern part of the Athens metropolitan area, in the municipality of Acharnes, East Attica, Greece. It was inaugurated on 8 March 1904 and reopened on 6 May 2005. It is owned by GAIAOSE, however, service are provided by Hellenic Train, through the Athens Suburban Railway from Athens to Chalcis. It is located close Tatoi Airport, however it does not serve the airport.

== History ==
The Station opened on 8 March 1904 as Tatoi railway station (Greek: Σιδηροδρομικός σταθμός Τατόι, romanized: Sidirodromikós stathmós Tatoi) in what was then the Central Greece on what was a branch line of the Piraeus, Demerli & Frontiers Railway. The station building is elaborate for such a small station (exceeding the traffic needs of the area it serves); however, since it was formerly used to service the nearby Tatoi Palace, the summer residence of the Greek Royal Family from which the station receives its name. In 1920, the station and most of the standard-gauge railways in Greece came under the control of the Hellenic State Railways (SEK). During the Axis occupation of Greece (1941–44), Athens was controlled by German military forces and the line used for the transport of troops and weapons. During the occupation (and especially during German withdrawal in 1944), the network was severely damaged by both the German army and Greek resistance groups. The track and rolling stock replacement took time following the civil war, with normal service levels resumed around 1948. In 1970 OSE became the legal successor to the SEK, taking over responsibilities for most of Greece's rail infrastructure. On 1 January 1971, the station and most of the Greek rail infrastructure was transferred to the Hellenic Railways Organisation S.A., a state-owned corporation known as OSE. The line was converted to diesel sometime before 1990. Freight traffic declined sharply when the state-imposed monopoly of OSE for the transport of agricultural products and fertilisers ended in the early 1990s. Many small stations of the network with little passenger traffic were closed down.

In 2001, the infrastructure element of OSE was created, known as GAIAOSE; it would henceforth be responsible for the maintenance of stations, bridges and other elements of the network, as well as the leasing and the sale of railway assets. In 2003, OSE launched "Proastiakos SA", as a subsidiary to serve the operation of the suburban network in the urban complex of Athens during the 2004 Olympic Games. In 2005, TrainOSE was created as a brand within OSE to concentrate on rail services and passenger interface. In 2008, all Athens Suburban Railway services were transferred from OSE to TrainOSE.

The station was reopened on 6 May 2005. In 2009, with the Greek debt crisis unfolding OSE's Management was forced to reduce services across the network. Timetables were cutback and routes closed, as the government-run entity attempted to reduce overheads. In 2017 OSE's passenger transport sector was privatised as TrainOSE, currently, a wholly owned subsidiary of Ferrovie dello Stato Italiane infrastructure, including stations, remained under the control of OSE. That same year on 30 July, Line 3 of the Athens Suburban Railway began serving the station. The Amnizia Railfan Club's Amnizia Railroad Club is housed within the station building.

The station is owned by GAIAOSE, which since 3 October 2001 owns most railway stations in Greece: the company was also in charge of rolling stock from December 2014 until October 2025, when Greek Railways (the owner of the Piraeus–Platy railway) took over that responsibility.

== Facilities ==
The ground-level station is accessed via stairs or a ramp. It has two side platforms, with the main station buildings located on the westbound platform; however inaccessible and rundown, with access to the platforms via stairs or lifts. The Station is housed in the original stone-built station buildings and is equipped with a booking office and waiting area. At platform level, both platforms have sheltered seating and Dot-matrix display departure and arrival screens and timetable poster boards. there is also a payphone located on the westbound platform. There is currently a small car park on-site. There is a bus stop outside the station where the local 537 call.

== Services ==
Since 22 November 2025, the following weekday services call at this station:

- Athens Suburban Railway Line A3 between Athens and Chalcis, with up to one train every two hours, plus one extra train during the weekday afternoon peak.

== Station layout ==
| L Ground/Concourse | Customer service | Tickets/Exits |
| Level; L1 | Side platform, doors will open on the right |
| Level; L1 | Platform 1 | to Athens (Acharnes) ← |
| Level; L1 | Platform 2 | → to Chalcis (Agios Stefanos) |
| Level; L1 | Side platform, doors will open on the right |

== See also ==
- Hellenic Railways Organization
- TrainOSE
- Proastiakos
- P.A.Th.E./P.
