= Oinofyta railway station =

Railway station in Boeotia, Greece

Οινόφυτα Oinofyta

General information
- Location: 320 11 Oinofyta; Boeotia; Greece
- Coordinates: 38.30690°N 23.63376°E
- Owner: GAIAOSE
- Operator: Hellenic Train
- Line: Piraeus–Platy railway
- Platforms: 2
- Tracks: 2

Construction
- Structure type: at-grade
- Accessible: Yes

Other information
- Status: Unstaffed
- Website: http://www.ose.gr/en/

Key dates
- 8 March 1904: Line opened
- 27 October 1983: Station opened
- 30 July 2017: Line electrified

Services
Preceding station	Suburban Rail	Following station
Agios Thomas towards Athens	Line A3	Oinoi towards Chalcis
Location

Oinofyta railway station (Greek: Σιδηροδρομικός σταθμός Οινοφύτων, romanized: Sidirodromikos stathmos Oinofyton) is a small train station on the Piraeus–Platy railway line in the village of Oinofyta in Boeotia, Greece. It is owned by OSE, but train services are provided by Hellenic Train, through the Athens Suburban Railway from Athens to Chalcis.

== History ==
The station was opened on 27 October 1983 when the line was upgraded. The line was converted to diesel sometime before 1990. Freight traffic declined sharply when the state-imposed monopoly of OSE for the transport of agricultural products and fertilisers ended in the early 1990s. Many small stations of the network with little passenger traffic were closed down. In 2001 the infrastructure element of OSE was created, known as GAIAOSE; it would henceforth be responsible for the maintenance of stations, bridges and other elements of the network, as well as the leasing and the sale of railway assists. In 2003, OSE launched "Proastiakos SA", as a subsidiary to serve the operation of the suburban network in the urban complex of Athens during the 2004 Olympic Games. In 2005, TrainOSE was created as a brand within OSE to concentrate on rail services and passenger interface. In 2008, all Athens Suburban Railway services were transferred from OSE to TrainOSE. The station was reopened on 6 May 2005. In 2009, with the Greek debt crisis unfolding OSE's Management was forced to reduce services across the network. Timetables were cutback and routes closed, as the government-run entity attempted to reduce overheads. In 2017 OSE's passenger transport sector was privatised as TrainOSE, currently a wholly owned subsidiary of Ferrovie dello Stato Italiane infrastructure, including stations, remained under the control of OSE. That same year on 30 July Line 3 of the Athens Suburban Railway began serving the station.

The station is owned by GAIAOSE, which since 3 October 2001 owns most railway stations in Greece: the company was also in charge of rolling stock from December 2014 until October 2025, when Greek Railways (the owner of the Piraeus–Platy railway) took over that responsibility.

== Facilities ==
The ground-level station is located within a small cutting and is assessed via stairs or a ramp. It has 2 side platforms, with the main station buildings located on the eastbound platform; however, due to state funding issues the booking office is closed; however, waiting shelters are available. There is no cafe or shop on-site. At platform level, there are sheltered seating but no Dot-matrix display departure or arrival screens; however, timetable poster boards on both platforms are available. There is no car park or bus connections at the station.

== Services ==
Since 22 November 2025, the following weekday services call at this station:

- Athens Suburban Railway Line A3 between Athens and Chalcis, with up to one train every two hours, plus one extra train during the weekday afternoon peak.

== Station layout ==
L Ground/Concourse	Customer service	Tickets/Exits
Level; L1	Side platform, doors will open on the right
Level; L1	Platform 1	← to Athens (Agios Thomas)
Level; L1	Platform 2	to Chalcis (Oinoi) →
Level; L1	Side platform, doors will open on the right
