= Pyrgos Vasilissis railway station =

Railway station in Athens, Greece

Πύργος Βασιλίσσης Pyrgos Vasilissis

General information
- Location: Agioi Anargyroi 135 62 Agioi Anargyroi-Kamatero; West Athens; Greece
- Coordinates: 38°02′22″N 23°43′39″E
- Owner: GAIAOSE
- Operator: Hellenic Train
- Line: Piraeus–Platy railway
- Platforms: 2
- Tracks: 4

Construction
- Structure type: at-grade
- Platform levels: 2
- Parking: Yes
- Accessible: Yes

Key dates
- 8 March 1904: Line opened
- 27 February 2014: Station opened
- 30 July 2017: Line electrified

Services
Preceding station	Suburban Rail	Following station
Agioi Anargyroi towards Piraeus	Line A1	Kato Acharnes towards Athens Airport
Agioi Anargyroi towards Piraeus	Line A4	Kato Acharnes towards Kiato
Line A3 does not stop here
Location

Pyrgos Vasilissis railway station (Greek: Σιδηροδρομικός σταθμός Πύργου Βασιλίσσης, romanized: Sidirodromikós Stathmós Pýrgou Vasilíssis) is a railway station on the Piraeus–Platy railway line in Agioi Anargyroi, a suburb in municipality of Agioi Anargyroi-Kamatero, in the regional unit of West Athens, Attica, Greece. It was opened on 27 February 2014 and is located in front of the stadium of Agioi Anargyroi (Constantinople and Messolonghi, Anakasa). The station owes its name to the large adjacent tower, built as a mock castle that was built as a holiday home of Queen Amalia.

== History ==
The station opened on 27 February 2014. In 2017 OSE's passenger transport sector was privatised as TrainOSE, currently, a wholly owned subsidiary of Ferrovie dello Stato Italiane infrastructure, including stations, remained under the control of OSE.

The station is owned by GAIAOSE, which since 3 October 2001 owns most railway stations in Greece: the company was also in charge of rolling stock from December 2014 until October 2025, when Greek Railways (the owner of the Piraeus–Platy railway) took over that responsibility.

== Facilities ==
The station building is above the platforms, with access to the platform level via stairs or lift. Access to the station is via steps or ramp. The station buildings are also equipped with toilets and a staffed ticket office. At platform level, there are sheltered seating and Dot-matrix display departure and arrival screens or timetable poster boards on both platforms. Currently, there is no local bus stop connecting the station with the center of Aigio. There is No car park at the station.

== Services ==
Since 22 November 2025, the following services call at this station:

- Athens Suburban Railway Line A1 between Piraeus and Athens Airport, with up to one train per hour;
- Athens Suburban Railway Line A4 between Piraeus and Kiato, with up to one train per hour.

Line A3 trains running between Athens and Chalcis do not call at this station.

== Station layout ==
L Ground/Concourse	Customer service	Tickets/Exits
Level; Ε1	Through Lines	Lines
Level; Ε1	Wall
Level; Ε1	Platform 1	← to Piraeus (Agioi Anargyroi)
Level; Ε1	Island platform, doors will open on the right
Level; Ε1	Platform 2	to Airport / to Kiato (Kato Acharnes) →

== Future ==
The Athens Metro Development Plan of October 2022 currently proposes an interchange with Line 4 at this station.

== See also ==
- Hellenic Railways Organization
- Hellenic Train
- Proastiakos
- P.A.Th.E./P.
