= Kato Acharnes railway station =

Station on the Piraeus–Platy railway line in Agioi Anargyroi, West Athens, Greece

Κάτω Αχαρναί Kato Acharnai

General information
- Location: Konstantinoupoleos, Acharnes 136 75, Athens; West Athens; Greece
- Coordinates: 38°03′14″N 23°43′57″E
- Owner: GAIAOSE
- Operator: Hellenic Train
- Line: Piraeus–Platy railway
- Platforms: 2
- Tracks: 4

Construction
- Structure type: at-grade
- Platform levels: 1
- Accessible: Yes

Other information
- Website: ose.gr/en/home/

Key dates
- 8 March 1904: Line opened
- 27 February 2014: Station opened
- 30 July 2017: Line electrified

Services
Preceding station	Suburban Rail	Following station
Pyrgos Vasilissis towards Piraeus	Line A1	Metamorfosi towards Athens Airport
Pyrgos Vasilissis towards Piraeus	Line A4	Zefyri towards Kiato
Line A3 does not stop here
Location

Kato Acharnes (Greek: Κάτω Αχαρνές) is a station on the Piraeus–Platy railway line in Agioi Anargyroi, West Athens. This station opened on 27 February 2014. It owes its name to the area of Kato Acharnes, and is located next to Merimna Square.

== History ==
The station opened on 27 February 2014. In 2017 OSE's passenger transport sector was privatised as TrainOSE, currently, a wholly owned subsidiary of Ferrovie dello Stato Italiane rail infrastructure, remained under the control of OSE while station infrastructure under Gaiose.

The station is owned by GAIAOSE, which since 3 October 2001 owns most railway stations in Greece: the company was also in charge of rolling stock from December 2014 until October 2025, when Greek Railways (the owner of the Piraeus–Platy railway) took over that responsibility.

== Facilities ==
The station building is above the platforms, with access to the platform level via stairs or lift. Access to the station is via steps or ramp. The station buildings are also equipped with toilets and a staffed ticket office. At platform level, there are sheltered seating and Dot-matrix display departure and arrival screens or timetable poster boards on both platforms on both platforms. Currently, there is no local bus stop connecting the station with the center of Aigio. There is No car park at the station.

== Services ==
Since 22 November 2025, the following services call at this station:

- Athens Suburban Railway Line A1 between Piraeus and Athens Airport, with up to one train per hour;
- Athens Suburban Railway Line A4 between Piraeus and Kiato, with up to one train per hour.

Northbound trains diverge from here, with trains towards the Airport heading eastbound along the A6 motorway, and trains towards Kiato heading westbound. Line A3 trains running between Athens and Chalcis do not call at this station.

== Station layout ==
P Platforms	Platform 1	← to Piraeus (Pyrgos Vasilissis)
P Platforms	Island platform, doors will open on the left
P Platforms	Platform 2	to Athens Airport (Metamorfosi) / to Kiato (Zefyri) →
Ground level	Customer service	Exits/Tickets

== See also ==
- Hellenic Railways Organization
- Hellenic Train
- Proastiakos
- P.A.Th.E./P.
