= Dilesi =

Village in Boeotia, Greece

Dilesi Δήλεσι
- Municipal unit
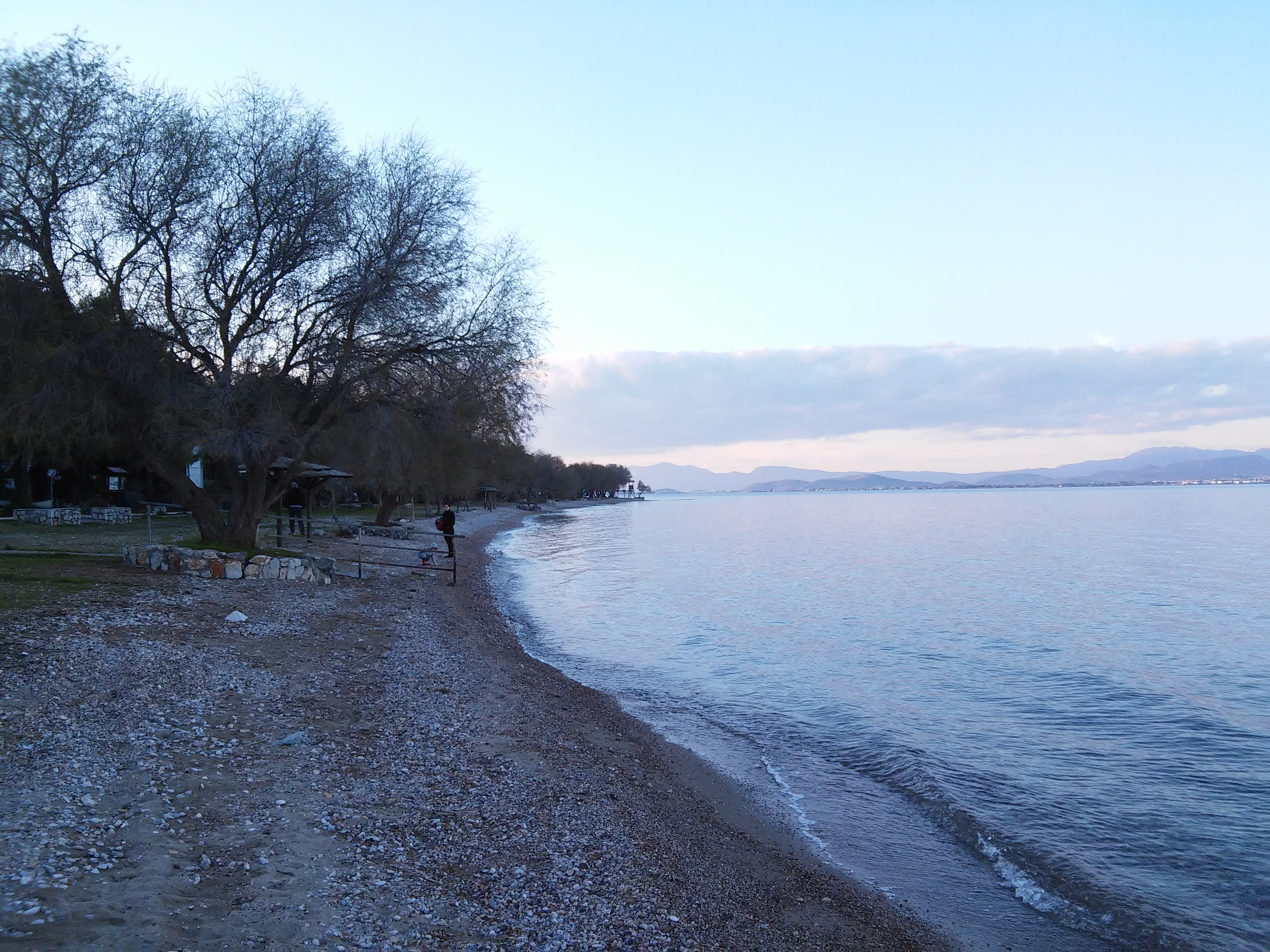
- Dilesi beach

- Location within the regional unit

- Location within Greece
- Coordinates: 38°20′20″N 23°40′20″E
- Country: Greece
- Administrative region: Central Greece
- Regional unit: Boeotia
- Municipality: Tanagra

Population (2021)
  - Municipal unit: 4,425
  - Community: 2,065
- Time zone: UTC+2 (EET)
  - Summer (DST): UTC+3 (EEST)

Dilesi (Greek: Δήλεσι) is a village and a municipal unit in Boeotia, Greece. It is part of the municipality of Tanagra, of which it is a municipal unit. The municipal unit consists of the communities Dilesi and Plaka Dilesi, both on the coast of the South Euboean Gulf. The population is 4,425 (2021). It is served by the Dilesi railway station, on the line from Chalcis to Athens. The municipal unit Dilesi was created in 2014 from parts of the municipal units Oinofyta (the village Dilesi) and Schimatari (the village Plaka Dilesi).

== See also ==
- List of settlements in Boeotia
