= Line A3 (Athens Suburban Railway) =

Rapid transit line in Athens, Greece

Line A3 (Athens–Chalcis)
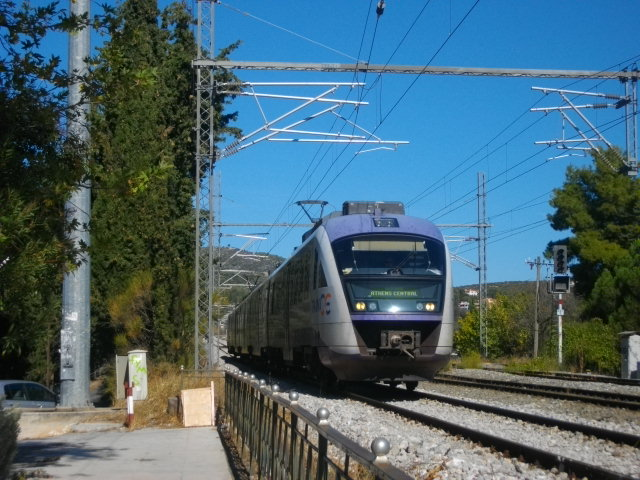
- A Siemens built OSE class 460 from Chalcis passing Afidnes Station, October 2017

Overview
- Service type: Commuter rail; Regional rail
- Status: Operating
- Locale: Attica; Central Greece
- First service: 14 March 2012
- Current operator: Hellenic Train
- Former operator: TrainOSE (2014–2022)
- Website: www.hellenictrain.gr

Route
- Termini: Athens; Chalcis
- Stops: 18
- Distance travelled: 82.8 km (51.4 mi)
- Average journey time: 1 hour 22 minutes
- Service frequency: 14 pairs per day (weekdays); 11 pairs per day (weekends)
- Lines used: Piraeus–Platy; Oinoi–Chalcis

Technical
- Rolling stock: OSE class 460 (EMU)
- Track gauge: 1,435 mm (4 ft 8 1/2 in) standard gauge
- Operating speed: 120 km/h (75 mph) (maximum)
- Track owners: Greek Railways (tracks); GAIAOSE (stations)

Line A3 is an Athens Suburban Railway (Proastiakos) service in Attica and Central Greece, operated by Hellenic Train. The service runs between Athens and Chalcis, with intermediate stations and halts in northern Attica and Boeotia: it runs concurrently with lines A1 and A4 out of Athens railway station, and also has an interchange with Line A2 at Acharnes Railway Center (SKA).

== History ==
Regular passenger trains between Athens (then Larissa Station) and Chalcis began on 8 March 1904. By 1997, then-operator Hellenic Railways Organisation labeled the route as "suburban", alongside the (now-closed) metre-gauge Piraeus–Loutraki service, albeit with no special branding.

Immediately following the creation of the Athens Suburban Railway in July 2004, there were plans to extend the network towards Chalcis and Thebes by as early as 2006; although test runs between Athens and Chalcis took place in 2009, the plan was repeatedly delayed. From 18 January 2012 to 29 July 2017, the Athens–Chalkida service was extended southward to Piraeus, due to the suspension of the Suburban Railway between Piraeus and Ano Liosia.

TrainOSE started including services to Chalcis as part of the Suburban Railway network on 14 March 2012, with the service appearing on maps by the summer of that year. Electric train services using Class 460 electric multiple units were introduced on 30 July 2017, when the electrification of the Piraeus–Platy railway between Agioi Anargyroi and Athens was complete. The service was numbered as Line A3 on 1 August 2023.

== Route ==
Line A3 is 82.8 kilometres (51.4 miles) long, running between Athens in the south and Chalcis in the north, with intermediate stations and halts in northern Attica and Boeotia: the service uses the Piraeus–Platy railway from Athens to Oinoi, largely parallel to the A1 motorway, before following the Oinoi–Chalcis railway towards Chalcis. The service runs concurrently with lines A1 and A4 between Athens and Acharnes Railway Center (SKA), but it does not stop at Pyrgos Vasilissis and Kato Acharnes: it also has an interchange with Line A2 at SKA.

As of September 2026, there are 11 pairs of trains per day, with a frequency of one train every two hours: however, the southern terminus for the first northbound and last southbound service is Oinoi, where a Line A3 train is stabled overnight. On weekdays, there is an extra pair of trains between Athens and Afidnes during the morning rush hour, and two extra pairs along the full route in the early morning and early evening, increasing frequency to a peak of one train per hour.

== Map ==
The route of Line A3

== Stations ==
The spelling of the station names on this table, in English and Greek, are according to the signage.

†	Terminal station
#	Interchange station
×	Under construction

Station English	Station Greek	Regional unit	Opened	Interchanges and notes	Position
Athina^{†#}	Αθήνα	Central Athens	8 March 1904	Interchange with Lines A1 and A4 to Piraeus, Hellenic Train, and Athens Metro Line 2 at Larissa Station.	37.992365°N 23.720215°E
Agioi Anargyroi^{#}	Άγιοι Ανάργυροι	West Athens	8 August 2010	Interchange with Line A1 to Athens Airport, and Line A4 to Kiato. This station opened as an infill station.	38.021770°N 23.718380°E
Line A3 does not serve Pyrgos Vasilissis and Kato Acharnes.
Acharnes Railway Center^{#}	Σιδηροδρομικό Κέντρο Αχαρνών	East Attica	5 April 2011	Interchange with Line A2, and Hellenic Train. This station opened as an infill station.	38.068285°N 23.737755°E
Acharnes	Αχαρνές	East Attica	8 March 1904		38.080265°N 23.743720°E
Dekeleia	Δεκέλεια	East Attica	8 March 1904		38.099485°N 23.779680°E
Kryoneri^{×}	Κρυονέρι	East Attica			38.123095°N 23.830170°E
Agios Stefanos	Άγιος Στέφανος	East Attica	8 March 1904		38.140305°N 23.859135°E
Afidnai	Αφίδναι	East Attica	8 March 1904		38.187755°N 23.844545°E
Sfendali	Σφενδάλη	East Attica	8 March 1904		38.235380°N 23.784635°E
Avlona	Αυλώνα	East Attica	8 March 1904		38.250005°N 23.695775°E
Agios Thomas	Άγιος Θωμάς	East Attica	8 March 1904		38.281640°N 23.667225°E
Oinofyta	Οινόφυτα	Boeotia	27 October 1983	This station opened as an infill station.	38.306945°N 23.633815°E
Oinoi^{#}	Οινόη	Boeotia	8 March 1904	Interchange with Hellenic Train.	38.322135°N 23.609560°E
Dilesi	Δήλεσι	Boeotia	6 April 2005	This station opened as an infill station.	38.337275°N 23.609120°E
Agios Georgios	Άγιος Γεώργιος	Boeotia	6 April 2005	This station opened as an infill station.	38.354885°N 23.607380°E
Kalochori-Panteichi	Καλοχώρι-Παντείχι	Euboea	6 April 2005	This station opened as an infill station.	38.389310°N 23.593120°E
Avlida	Αυλίδα	Euboea	8 March 1904		38.404425°N 23.603345°E
Chalkida^{†}	Χαλκίδα	Euboea	8 March 1904		38.462535°N 23.586230°E

== See also ==
- Hellenic Railways Organisation
- Hellenic Train
- Proastiakos
