= Schimatari =

Schimatari Σχηματάρι
- Municipal unit
- Location within the regional unit

- Location within Greece
- Coordinates: 38°21′N 23°35′E
- Country: Greece
- Administrative region: Central Greece
- Regional unit: Boeotia
- Municipality: Tanagra

Area
  - Municipal unit: 38.285 km^{2} (14.782 sq mi)
- Elevation: 95 m (312 ft)

Population (2021)
  - Municipal unit: 4,723
  - Municipal unit density: 123.4/km^{2} (319.5/sq mi)
- Time zone: UTC+2 (EET)
  - Summer (DST): UTC+3 (EEST)
- Vehicle registration: ΒΙ

Schimatari (Greek: Σχηματάρι) is a town and a former municipality in Boeotia, Greece. Since the 2011 local government reform it is part of the municipality Tanagra, of which it is the seat and a municipal unit. The municipal unit has an area of 38.285 km^{2}. It is situated in the wide valley of the river Asopos, at 6 km from the South Euboean Gulf coast. The A1 motorway (Athens - Lamia - Thessaloniki) passes north of Schimatari. Schimatari is located 13 km south of Chalcis, 23 km east of Thebes and 43 km north-northwest of Athens. The Tanagra Airport lies to the south.

An agricultural settlement until the 1980s, its proximity to Athens has led to a significant growth in industrial activities and population.

== Subdivisions ==
The municipal unit of Schimatari consists of a single community, Schimatari, which includes the villages of Oinoi and Schimatari. In 2014, the village of Plaka Dilesi was separated from the municipal unit of Oinofyta and incorporated into the newly established municipal unit of Dilesi.

== Population ==
Year	Town population	Municipal unit population
1981	3,287	-
1991	4,136	-
2001	4,725	8,095
2011	4,035	7,173
2021	3,868	4,723

== Twin cities ==
- Pozzoleone, Italy
- (Republic of Ireland) Ennistymon, Ireland

== See also ==
- List of settlements in Boeotia
