= Athens Suburban Railway =

Commuter rail network in Athens

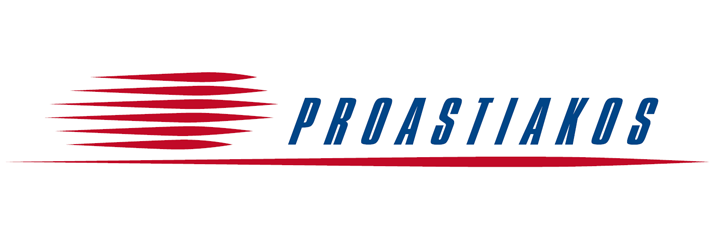

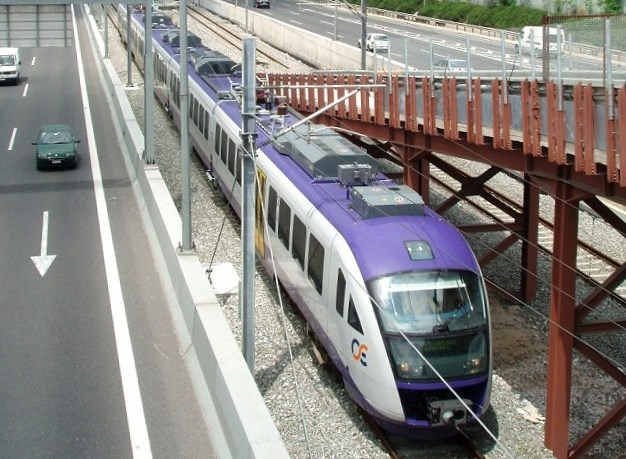
- An OSE class 460 train in the median strip of Attiki Odos, bound for Athens Airport.

Overview
- Native name: Προαστιακός Αθηνών
- Owner: OSE (tracks); GAIAOSE (buildings)
- Area served: Attica, Central Greece and Peloponnese, Greece
- Transit type: Commuter rail Regional rail
- Number of lines: 4
- Number of stations: 45
- Website: hellenictrain.gr

Operation
- Began operation: 30 July 2004; 22 years ago
- Operator: Hellenic Train
- Number of vehicles: 20 OSE class 460 EMUs; 17 OSE class 560 DMUs

Technical
- System length: 227.82 km (141.56 mi)
- Track gauge: 1,435 mm (4 ft 8 1/2 in) standard gauge
- Electrification: 25 kV AC, 50 Hz
- Top speed: 160 km/h (99 mph)

The Athens Suburban Railway (Greek: Προαστιακός Αθηνών, romanized: Proastiakós Athínon), officially the Athens Suburban and Regional Railway, is a commuter rail service that connects the city of Athens and its metropolitan area with nearby settlements in Attica, Boeotia, Corinthia and the city of Chalcis in Euboea.

The first section of the Suburban Railway, linking the main Athens railway station with the Athens International Airport, opened on 30 July 2004, two weeks before the start of the 2004 Summer Olympics in the Greek capital. From 2005 to 2018, the network was gradually electrified and expanded to serve Piraeus to the south, Corinth and Kiato to the west, and Chalcis to the north. The Athens Suburban Railway is currently operated by Hellenic Train (formerly TrainOSE).

== History ==
Proastiakos SA was founded in 2003 as a subsidiary of OSE to serve the operation of the suburban network in the urban complex of Athens during the 2004 Olympic Games. The first line, linking central Athens with Athens International Airport, was inaugurated on 30 July 2004, two weeks before the 2004 Olympic Games. This first section was not electrified and operated by Class 560 (Stadler GTW) DMUs every half hour. In January 2005 the test runs to Corinth started and the line was delivered to the public on 27 September that same year. Also in 2005 Proastiakos was absorbed by the company TrainOSE (now Hellenic Train), which was now responsible for providing all rail passenger and commercial transport.

In 2007, with the completion of the works of the Airport–Patras railway until Kiato, Proastiakos expanded services on what is now Line A4, while in 2009 services were expanded to Chalkida forming Line A3. In 2008, TrainOSE was spun off and became independent of OSE, still using the Proastiakos emblem for those services. In 2009, with the Greek debt crisis unfolding OSE's Management was forced to reduce services across the network. Timetables were cut back, and routes closed as the government-run entity attempted to reduce overheads. Services from Athens Airport & Athens were cut back, with some ticket offices closing, reducing the reliability of services and passenger numbers.

However, from 2010, the electrification works of the lines with 25 kV AC, 50 Hz began to be completed, allowing the use of Class 460 (Siemens Desiro) EMUs. The electrification projects were completed as follows:

- SKA–Kiato section in 2010
- Oinoi–Chalcis branch line in 2013
- Oinoi–SKA and SKA–Treis Gefyres in 2015
- Treis Gefyres–Athens section in 2017
- Athens–Piraeus section in 2018

In fact, the extension of electrification to Athens Central station on 30 July 2017 led to the reorganisation of Suburban Railway services, moving the primary hub and starting point to the central station of the capital. In 2017 TrainOSE was privatised and became wholly owned subsidiary of Ferrovie dello Stato Italiane while infrastructure, including stations, remained under the control of OSE. On 1 February 2018, the electrification of the Piraeus-Athens Central station section of the network was completed.

During the COVID-19 pandemic, TrainOSE provided free antiseptic gel to the passenger public onboard its commuter trains.

=== Timeline ===
Date	Routes	Notes
30 Jul 2004	Athens–Athens Airport	The Athens–Athens Airport service is introduced for the 2004 Summer Olympics.
27 Sep 2005	Athens–Athens Airport Neratziotissa–Athens Airport (EMU) Athens–Corinth (via Neratziotissa) Corinth–Athens Airport	Electrification completed until Neratziotissa. Athens–Corinth, Neratziotissa–Athens Airport & Corinth–Athens Airport services introduced. Until the completion of the westbound curve at SKA, the first available turnaround siding for trains to Corinth was located at Neratziotissa station.
4 Jun 2007	Piraeus–Athens Airport Neratziotissa–Athens Airport (EMU) Piraeus–Corinth (via Neratziotissa) Athens Airport–Corinth	Athens–Athens Airport & Athens–Corinth services are extended south to Piraeus.
9 Jul 2007	Piraeus–Athens Airport Neratziotissa–Athens Airport (EMU) Piraeus–Kiato (via Neratziotissa) Athens Airport–Kiato	The Piraeus–Corinth service is extended west to Kiato.
6 Jul 2008	Piraeus–Kiato Ano Liosia–Neratziotissa Neratziotissa–Athens Airport (EMU)	Completion of westbound curve at S.K.A. Athens Airport–Kiato and Piraeus–Athens Airport services suspended pending electrification.
14 Feb 2009	Piraeus–Kiato Ano Liosia–Athens Airport (EMU)	Electrification extended to Ano Liosia. Ano Liosia–Athens Airport route merged into a single service.
12 Dec 2010	Piraeus–Ano Liosia Athens Airport–Kiato (EMU)	Athens Airport–Kiato services reinstated, Piraeus–Kiato services shortened to Ano Liosia.
18 Jan 2012	Athens Airport–Kiato (EMU)	The Piraeus–Ano Liosia service is suspended, partially replaced by the extended Piraeus–Chalcis service.
14 Mar 2012	Athens Airport–Kiato (EMU) Piraeus–Chalcis	TrainOSE starts including the Piraeus–Chalcis service as part of the Suburban Railway, with the service appearing on maps by the summer of that year.
10 Feb 2014	Athens–Ano Liosia Athens Airport–Kiato (EMU) Piraeus–Chalcis	Athens–Ano Liosia services via the westbound curve at SKA resume.
30 Jul 2017	Athens–Athens Airport SKA–Athens Airport Athens–Chalcis Athens–Kiato Athens–Piraeus (DMU)	Services are reorganized following the completion of electrification from Agioi Anargyroi to Athens; Athens becomes a hub for most services, while a new SKA–Athens Airport service increases the frequency of trains along the Attiki Odos median.
1 Feb 2018	Piraeus–Athens Airport SKA–Athens Airport Athens–Chalcis Piraeus–Kiato	With the final extension of electrification to Piraeus, the Athens–Athens Airport and Athens–Kiato services are extended south to Piraeus.
24 Feb 2018	Piraeus–Athens Airport Ano Liosia–Athens Airport Athens–Chalcis Piraeus–Kiato	The SKA–Athens Airport service is extended west to Ano Liosia.
1 Aug 2023	A1 (Piraeus–Athens Airport) A2 (Ano Liosia–Athens Airport) A3 (Athens–Chalcis) A4 (Piraeus–Kiato)	Hellenic Train introduces route numbers for the Suburban Railway.

== Lines and services ==
Since 1 August 2023, the Athens Suburban Railway consists of four lines. Line A1 runs between Piraeus and Athens Airport, while Line A2 reinforces the preceding service along the median of the A6 motorway between the Airport and Ano Liosia. Line A3 runs between Athens and Chalcis, and Line A4 runs between Piraeus and Kiato. In 2020, train services between Kiato and Aigio were introduced as a regional Peloponnese service. The Athens Suburban Railway operates from 4:30 am to midnight daily, and there are 45 stations in the network.

From 18 January 2012 to 9 February 2014, services along the westbound curve of Acharnes Railway Center (SKA) were suspended: TrainOSE claimed that the suspension was due to "technical problems", but the Athens Transport blog noted the "prevailing belief" that the financial situation of the company contributed to the prolonged suspension.

=== Main services ===
The following table lists the routes and the stations for the Athens Suburban Railway since 15 May 2022. Line numbers were introduced on 1 August 2023.

Outline of Athens Suburban Railway routes
Line	Map colour	Prefix	Route	Stations	Length	Ref.
Athens Suburban Railway Line A1	Yellow	12xx, 32xx	Piraeus–Athens–Athens Airport	19	48.23 km	
Athens Suburban Railway Line A2	Purple	22xx, 42xx	Ano Liosia–Athens Airport	12	33.18 km	
Athens Suburban Railway Line A3	Lime green	15xx, 25xx, 35xx	Athens–Chalcis	17	82.80 km	
Athens Suburban Railway Line A4	Sky blue	13xx, 23xx	Piraeus–Athens–Kiato	20	120.70 km	

== List of stations ==
The spelling of the station names on this table, in English and Greek, are according to the signage.

†	Terminal station
#	Interchange station

The suburban railway connects with other rail services at the following stations:

#	Station	Lines	Services	Connections	Regional unit
1	Acharnes	Athens–Chalcis	Athens Suburban Railway Line A3		East Attica
2	SKA^{#}	Ano Liosia–Airport; Athens–Chalcis	Athens Suburban Railway Line A2 Athens Suburban Railway Line A3	Hellenic Train	East Attica
3	Afidnes	Athens–Chalcis	Athens Suburban Railway Line A3		East Attica
4	Agioi Anargyroi	Athens–Thessaloniki	Athens Suburban Railway Line A1 Athens Suburban Railway Line A3 Athens Suburban Railway Line A4		West Athens
5	Agios Georgios	Athens–Chalcis	Athens Suburban Railway Line A3		Boeotia
6	Agios Stefanos	Athens–Chalcis	Athens Suburban Railway Line A3		East Attica
7	Agioi Theodoroi	Piraeus–Kiato; Aigio–Airport	Athens Suburban Railway Line A4		Corinthia
8	Agios Thomas	Athens–Chalcis	Athens Suburban Railway Line A3		Boeotia
9	Ano Liosia	Piraeus–Kiato; Ano Liosia–Airport; Aigio–Airport	Athens Suburban Railway Line A2 Athens Suburban Railway Line A4		West Attica
10	Aspropyrgos	Piraeus–Kiato	Athens Suburban Railway Line A4		West Attica
11	Athens^{#†}	Athens–Thessaloniki	Athens Suburban Railway Line A1 Athens Suburban Railway Line A3 Athens Suburban Railway Line A4	Hellenic Train Athens Metro Athens Metro Line 2	Central Athens
12	Athens Airport^{†}	Piraeus–Airport; Ano Liosia–Airport; Aigio–Airport	Athens Suburban Railway Line A1 Athens Suburban Railway Line A2	Athens Metro Athens Metro Line 3	East Attica
13	Avlida	Athens–Chalcis	Athens Suburban Railway Line A3		Euboea
14	Avlona	Athens–Chalcis	Athens Suburban Railway Line A3		East Attica
15	Chalcis^{†}	Athens–Chalcis	Athens Suburban Railway Line A3		Euboea
16	Corinth	Piraeus–Kiato; Aigio–Airport; Aigio–Athens	Athens Suburban Railway Line A4		Corinthia
17	Dekeleia	Athens–Chalcis	Athens Suburban Railway Line A3		East Attica
18	Dilesi	Athens–Chalcis	Athens Suburban Railway Line A3		Boeotia
19	Doukissis Plakentias^{#}	Piraeus–Airport; Ano Liosia–Airport; Aigio–Airport	Athens Suburban Railway Line A1 Athens Suburban Railway Line A2	Athens Metro Athens Metro Line 3	North Athens
20	Irakleio	Piraeus–Airport; Ano Liosia–Airport	Athens Suburban Railway Line A1 Athens Suburban Railway Line A2		North Athens
21	Kalochori-Panteichi	Athens–Chalcis	Athens Suburban Railway Line A3		Boeotia
22	Kato Acharnes	Piraeus–Airport; Piraeus–Kiato	Athens Suburban Railway Line A1 Athens Suburban Railway Line A4		West Athens
23	Kiato^{†#}	Piraeus–Kiato; Aigio–Airport; Aigio–Athens; Aigio–Kiato	Athens Suburban Railway Line A4	Bus	Corinthia
24	Kifisias	Piraeus–Airport; Ano Liosia–Airport; Aigio–Airport	Athens Suburban Railway Line A1 Athens Suburban Railway Line A2		North Athens
25	Kinetta	Piraeus–Kiato	Athens Suburban Railway Line A4		West Attica
26	Koropi^{#}	Piraeus–Airport; Ano Liosia–Airport	Athens Suburban Railway Line A1 Athens Suburban Railway Line A2	Athens Metro Athens Metro Line 3	East Attica
27	Lefka	Piraeus–Airport; Piraeus–Kiato	Athens Suburban Railway Line A1 Athens Suburban Railway Line A4		Piraeus
28	Magoula	Piraeus–Kiato; Aigio–Airport; Aigio–Athens	Athens Suburban Railway Line A4		West Attica
29	Megara	Piraeus–Kiato; Aigio–Airport; Aigio–Athens	Athens Suburban Railway Line A4		West Attica
30	Metamorfosi	Piraeus–Airport; Ano Liosia–Airport	Athens Suburban Railway Line A1 Athens Suburban Railway Line A2		North Athens
31	Nea Peramos	Piraeus–Kiato; Aigio–Airport; Aigio–Athens	Athens Suburban Railway Line A4		West Attica
32	Nerantziotissa^{#}	Piraeus–Airport; Ano Liosia–Airport; Aigio–Airport	Athens Suburban Railway Line A1 Athens Suburban Railway Line A2	Athens Metro Athens Metro Line 1	North Athens
33	Oinofyta	Athens–Chalcis	Athens Suburban Railway Line A3		Boeotia
34	Oinoi^{#}	Ano Liosia–Airport	Athens Suburban Railway Line A3	Hellenic Train	Boeotia
35	Paiania–Kantza^{#}	Piraeus–Airport; Ano Liosia–Airport	Athens Suburban Railway Line A1 Athens Suburban Railway Line A2	Athens Metro Athens Metro Line 3	East Attica
36	Pallini^{#}	Piraeus–Airport; Ano Liosia–Airport	Athens Suburban Railway Line A1 Athens Suburban Railway Line A2	Athens Metro Athens Metro Line 3	East Attica
37	Pentelis	Piraeus–Airport; Ano Liosia–Airport	Athens Suburban Railway Line A1 Athens Suburban Railway Line A2		North Athens
38	Piraeus^{†}	Piraeus–Airport; Piraeus–Kiato	Athens Suburban Railway Line A1 Athens Suburban Railway Line A4	Athens Metro Athens Metro Line 1 Athens Metro Line 3	Piraeus
39	Pyrgos Vasilissis	Piraeus–Airport; Piraeus–Kiato	Athens Suburban Railway Line A1 Athens Suburban Railway Line A4		West Athens
40	Rentis	Piraeus–Airport; Piraeus–Kiato	Athens Suburban Railway Line A1 Athens Suburban Railway Line A4		Piraeus
41	Rouf	Piraeus–Airport; Piraeus–Kiato	Athens Suburban Railway Line A1 Athens Suburban Railway Line A4		Central Athens
42	Sfendali	Athens–Chalcis	Athens Suburban Railway Line A3		East Attica
43	Tavros	Piraeus–Airport; Piraeus–Kiato	Athens Suburban Railway Line A1 Athens Suburban Railway Line A4		South Athens
44	Zefyri	Piraeus–Kiato	Athens Suburban Railway Line A4		West Athens
45	Zevgolatio	Piraeus–Kiato; Aigio–Athens	Athens Suburban Railway Line A4		Corinthia

== Rolling stock ==
Proastiakos uses rolling stock owned by GAIAOSE and maintained by Hellenic Train. Since the entire network is electrified, multiple units are used almost exclusively, with Siemens Desiro 5-car electric multiple units (EMU) consisting of the principal rolling stock of the network, while Stadler GTW-2/6 and MAN-2000 diesel two-car multiple units (DMU-2) can be seen to either add extra capacity in cases of rolling stock unavailability or electrification problems.

In December 2025, Hellenic Train ordered 23 Alstom Coradia Stream EMUs, 11 of which are to be implemented on services in the Athens and Thessaloniki suburban networks, to boost efficacy and frequency. The first units are expected to enter service within the second trimester of 2027.

== Tickets and Scheduling ==
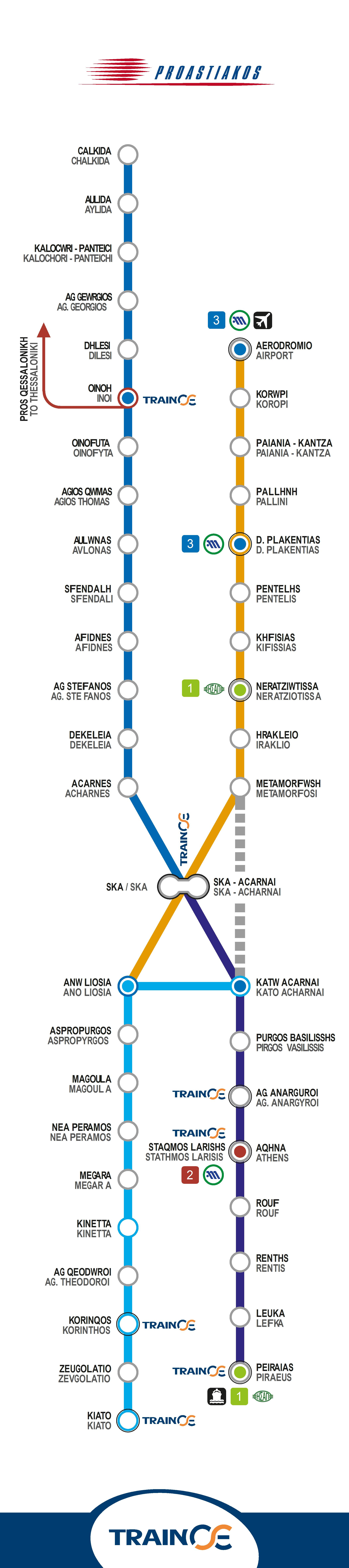
Athens Suburban Railway map c.2012, in English and Greek

The Magoula–Koropi and Piraeus–SKA sections of the Suburban Railway network are part of the urban fare zone of Transport for Athens (OASA), therefore the single unified ticket that is used within all means of public transport in Athens is valid. Outside the urban area, Hellenic Train issues regular distance-based tickets.

== Photography on the network ==
The photography in the publicly accessible areas of both OSE and the Athens Suburban Railway (defined as passenger space on trains and at stations) is permitted, as the right of photographers to photograph within the Suburban Railway is covered by the Constitution. The issue was mediated by the Ombudsman between 2004 and 2008 on the occasion of the attempt to temporarily ban photography during the Olympic Games. The court ruled that "the requirement of a 'photography permit' is tantamount to a ban" and that "there is no legal authority to impose restrictions on the right to photograph spaces and slides by definition accessible to the public".

== Future expansion ==
=== New stations ===
- Infill station in Kryoneri by 2027. (Line A3)
- Proposed infill station in Gerakas. (Lines A1, A2)
- Proposed infill station at Karellas. (Lines A1, A2)

=== New lines and services ===
==== Reopening of the Ano Liosia–Elefsina–Megara line ====
On 21 December 2023, OSE signed a €95.7 million contract for the reopening of a 34.5 km section of the former metre-gauge Piraeus–Patras railway (converted to standard-gauge) from Ano Liosia to Megara, with stations at:

- Ano Liosia
- ELPE Aspropyrgos (Aspropyrgos Refineries)
- Aspropyrgos (old station)
- Vamvakia
- Elefsina
- ELPE Elefsina
- Loutropyrgos
- Nea Peramos (old station)
- Megara (existing station)

The contract also includes the option of an additional extension to the old Megara station in the town's center. The line is planned as single-track, but its footprint will include sufficient space for a future upgrade to double-track from Ano Liosia to Elefsina. Metka ATE (a subsidiary of Metlen) was selected as the contractor for the project with an original opening date scheduled for early 2026, but which has since been delayed to at least 2027.

==== Reopening of the Loutraki branch line ====
In February 2019, OSE signed a €12 million contract to convert the former 6.4 km metre-gauge line between Isthmos and Loutraki to standard-gauge and connect it to the Athens Airport–Patras railway, with an initial completion date of December 2020. The Mytilineos–Xanthakis consortium was selected as the contractor of the project. Due to an appeal by a rival bidder, the signing of the contract was delayed until 4 June 2019. The project consists of the regauging and electrification of the single-track Isthmos–Loutraki line, and includes three stations: Isthmos, Casino and Loutraki. Following several delays, as of October 2026 the project is scheduled to be completed by 31 December 2026.

==== Proposed Lavrio extension ====
A nine-station, 32 km extension of the Athens Suburban Railway from Koropi to Lavrio was announced in 2016, potentially connecting 300,000 more people to the rail network at a cost of €160 million. The project involves the construction of two new stations at Markopoulo and Lavrio Port, and five intermediate stops at Kalyvia, Keratea, Daskaleio, Thorikos and Kyprianos. The Athens-Lavrio distance will be 55 minutes and Koropi-Lavrio 28 minutes with the completion of the extension.

==== Proposed Rafina branch ====
A €40 million branch line from Doukissis Plakentias station to the town of Rafina has also been proposed. with an extension to the Airport via Artemida and Rafina.

== See also ==
- Hellenic Railways Organisation
- Hellenic Train
- Proastiakos
- Public transport in Athens
- Athens Metro
- Athens Airport–Patras railway
- Piraeus–Patras railway
- Proastiakos Patras
- Thessaloniki Regional Railway (formerly the Thessaloniki Suburban Railway)
- Rail transport in Greece
