= P.A.Th.E./P. =

Central rail line in Greece

P.A.Th.E./P. Π.Α.Θ.Ε./Π.

Overview
- Status: Operational (partly under construction)
- Owner: OSE
- Locale: Greece
- Termini: Athens Patras; Thessaloniki Idomeni Promachonas

Service
- Type: Higher-speed rail Commuter rail
- Operator: Hellenic Train

Technical
- Line length: approx. 700 km
- Number of tracks: Double track (Patras-Athens-Thessaloniki); Single track (Thessaloniki-Idomeni/Promachonas)
- Track gauge: 1,435 mm (4 ft 8 1/2 in) standard gauge
- Operating speed: Average: 160 km/h (100 mph); Maximum: 200 km/h (125 mph)

P.A.Th.E./P (Greek: Π.Α.Θ.Ε./Π., Πάτρα - Αθήνα - Θεσσαλονίκη - Ειδομένη/Προμαχώνας), which stands for Patras–Athens–Thessaloniki–Idomeni/Promachonas is a higher-speed rail line in Greece which is partly completed and partly under construction. The section between Athens and Thessaloniki was completed in 2019 and allows a theoretical minimum travel time of 3 hours and 20 minutes, although that has never been achieved in regular service. The line was significantly damaged by Storm Daniel in July 2023, and as of January 2026 is still undergoing extensive repairs.

== History ==
Development of a modern rail network for Greece has been a major goal since the 1990s. In 1996, construction of what is currently known as the P.A.Th.E./P. was given the go-ahead. The line, which should have opened by 2004, will link Patras, Athens and Thessaloniki with the neighbouring countries Republic of North Macedonia and Bulgaria via the border stations at Idomeni and Promachonas, respectively.

The project has been faced with delays because of construction and finance. Although 2004 should have been the year the modern electrified rail network opened, opening dates were pushed back many times. This does not mean that the line is fully under construction. The Domokos to Thessaloniki part opened, although unelectrified, in 2004, and the Athens to Kiato line in 2005 up to Corinth and in 2007 up to Kiato, once again, unelectrified. Both lines where electrified between 2010 and 2011. In 2020, the Kiato–Aigio section opened.

The full length of the electrified line between Athens and Thessaloniki entered service in 2019, and ETR 470 trains were introduced on this section in May 2022, with a total travel time of 3 hours and 55 minutes. The service was plagued by maintenance issues with the trains and eventually suspended when the last unit was withdrawn from service after a breakdown in November 2024. The line itself was extensively damaged along a 120 km section in July 2023 by Storm Daniel. As of January 2026 repairs are continuing, and the minimum travel time on the entire line, using conventional rolling stock, is 5 hours and 12 minutes.

== Sections ==
The line is further split into several sections. These are:

Line	Speed	Length	Type of works	Construction began	Expected start of revenue services	Electrification
Athens - Oinoi - Tithorea	up to 200 km/h	156 km	Electrification	2015	2016	Line fully electrified at opening
Tithorea - Domokos	160 – 200 km/h	106 km	New line	1996	2019	Line fully electrified at opening
Domokos - Thessaloniki	up to 200 km/h	232.5 km	New line with old, upgraded sections	1996	2004	2011
Thessaloniki - Idomeni	160 km/h	71 km	Upgraded line with new sections	2007	2026	Line fully electrified at opening
Thessaloniki - Promachonas	160 km/h	110.4 km	Upgraded line	2017	TBA	Line fully electrified at opening
Athens International Airport - Kiato	up to 200 km/h	105 km	New line	1998	2005 (up to Corinth), 2007 (full line)	2010
Kiato - Aigio	150 – 200 km/h	72 km	New line	2006	2020	2026
Aigio - Psathopyrgos	100 – 150 km/h	27.6 km	New line	2012	2026	Line fully electrified at opening
Psathopyrgos - Rio	TBA	21.5 km	New line	2017	2028	Line fully electrified at opening
Rio - Patras	TBA	8.5 km	New line with old, upgraded and underground sections	TBA	TBA	Line fully electrified at opening

== Further proposals ==
In March 2018, ErgOSE announced the intention to upgrade the closed Patras-Kalamata metre gauge railway to standard gauge, with maximum speed of 160 km/h. This would presumably take place once the Athens-Patras section is opened.

Although still unofficial, these sections may well be constructed in the future. They have no timetable of construction and are not being forwarded yet. Most of them are in the area around Athens.

Line	Reason for construction
Thriasion - Thiva Line	This line further will cut journey times by 30 minutes and supplement the existing Athens to Thiva Line, providing an alternative route for passenger and freight trains as well as relieving what is expected to become a major bottleneck on the Greek Rail Network.
Acharnes Bypass	A tunnel that will reroute all of the regional, intercity and freight trains outside of the Athens suburb of Acharnes, increasing speeds and free the current line exclusively for commuter train usage. This project will likely be supplemented by an upgrading of the Athens to Oinoi line.
Upgrading of the Athens - Oinoi Line	This project will upgrade the current line or create a new, parallel line. It has the same goal as the Elefsina-Thiva Line and will not be constructed if the aforementioned line gets the green light.
Platy Bypass	A diversion of the line eliminating the village of Platy, its station as well as a sharp curve just before it. The proposal was never seriously considered because the journey time cut would not be as much as the desired and because it would eliminate Platy Station, a major station for passengers transferring to regional trains.

== Rolling stock ==
=== Passenger services ===
Currently, the Rolling Stock used for passenger services on the line varies. Diesel powered trains include the Stadler GTW are in operation around Athens, serving the largely unelectrified network of the city, while MAN 2000 DMUs and OSE Class 520 can be seen at rare occasions. The Class 220 Locomotive alongside railcars currently serves all Intercity and Higher Speed services on the unelectrified sections of the lines, whereas Class 120 locomotives pull the cars on the electrified sections. Regional and Commuter services on the electrified sections are exclusively operated by Class 460 Siemens Desiro EMUs. Although the 30 Class 120 electric locomotives are enough to provide long-distance services on the network, regional rolling stock is going to be needed, since the Desiro trains are not going to be enough. Purchasing new rolling stock is the obvious choice, however, the difficult financial situation, it has also been purposed to convert some if not all Stadler GTWs to electric traction. Trenitalia, the new owner of TrainOSE, the sole operator of passenger trains in Greece announced in 2017 that new rolling stock, probably Italian, is going to be ordered sometime in the future.

In September 2017, Trenitalia announced that the V250 trains, formerly operated on the Fyra service between Amsterdam, Brussels and Breda may be used for services between Athens and Thessaloniki. However, in August 2018, Trenitalia instead tested Frecciargento Class ETR 485 trains to operate on the Athens-Thessaloniki line in 2018–2019. However, eventually Trenitalia opted for class ETR 470 Frecciabianca trains, converted to operate under 25 kV 50 Hz AC instead of 15 kV 16,7 Hz AC. These units were introduced in regular service in May 2022, and all were subsequently withdrawn due to maintenance issues by November 2024.

=== Cargo services ===
For many years, Class A 501-510 Locomotives built by MLW have been the main traction for freight services in Greece and are probably going to remain for many years. Class 220 Locomotives are frequently seen hauling cargo trains, although they are not as powerful and are optimized for passenger services. The only Electric Locomotive of Greece, the Class 120, is also seen hauling cargo services mainly on the Thessaloniki to Idomeni Line, but it is also optimized for passenger transportation.
