= Chalcis railway station =

Railway station in Chalcis, Euboea, Greece

Χαλκίδα Chalkida
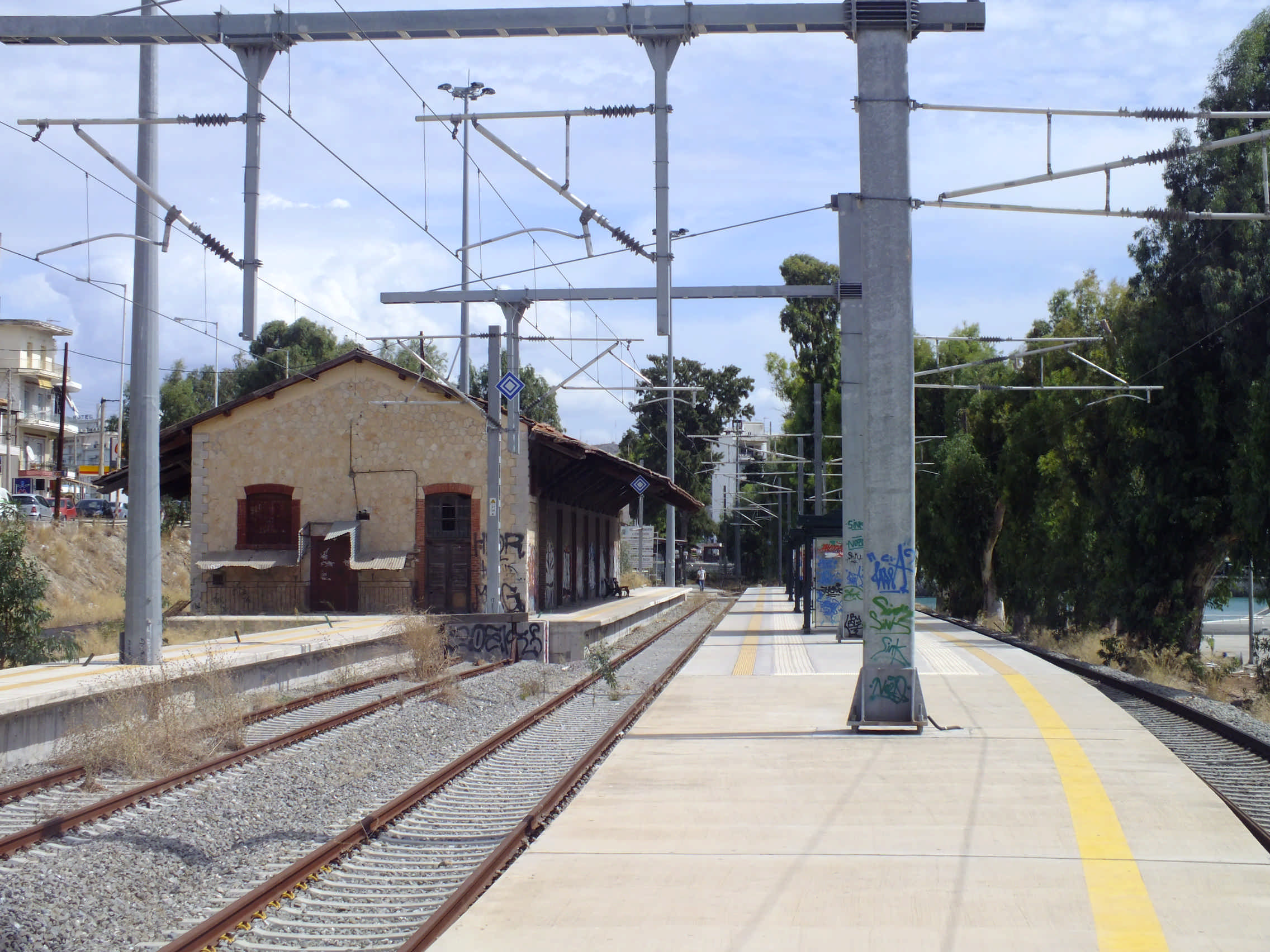
- The station platforms, with the former freight building on the left, February 2013

General information
- Location: Xirovrysi; 341 00 Chalcis; Greece
- Coordinates: 38°27′46″N 23°35′10″E
- Owner: GAIAOSE
- Operator: Hellenic Train
- Line: Oinoi–Chalcis railway
- Platforms: 2
- Tracks: 3

Construction
- Structure type: at-grade
- Platform levels: 1
- Parking: Yes
- Accessible: Yes

Other information
- Status: Staffed
- Website: http://www.ose.gr/en/

Key dates
- 8 March 1904: Opened
- 30 July 2017: Electrified

Services
Preceding station	Suburban Rail	Following station
Avlida towards Athens	Line A3	Terminus
Location

Chalcis railway station (Greek: Σιδηροδρομικός σταθμός Χαλκίδος, romanized: Sidirodromikos stathmos Chalkídos) is a railway station in the city of Chalcis, in Euboea, Greece. Opened on 8 March 1904, it is now the northern terminus station of the Athens - Chalcis service of Proastiakos. The station sits close to the waterfront, with a small promenade running parallel to the platforms. It is owned by OSE, but services are provided by Hellenic Train through the Athens Suburban Railway to Oinoi and Athens.

== History ==
The inauguration of the station took place on 6 March 1904, along with the construction of the first 121 kilometres (75 mi) of the line, when an official dinner for 400 people was given on its premises, with the presence of three warships, one English, one French and one Greek. The station opened to traffic two days later, along with the rest of the line on 8 March 1904, in what was then the Central Greece on what was a branch line of the Piraeus, Demerli & Frontiers Railway. Construction of the line had been authorized in 1889 by the law AΨΜΕ / 7-4-1889 concerning the construction and operation of the Piraeus-Larissa and Border railway line, but work only commenced in 1902 after the foundation of Hellenic State Railways. The station building was built to a similar standard as other stations on the line, such as Agios Stefanos, Dekeleia and the old Piraeus railway station. The station had a water tower of 50 cubic meters and rotary plate. In 1915 the station was served by two trains a day from Athens, which over the years increased to five and then seven. After doubling the Oinoi–Chalcis Line this increased to nine.

In 1920 the station and most of the standard gauge railways in Greece came under the control of the Hellenic State Railways (SEK). During the Axis occupation of Greece (1941–44), Athens was controlled by German military forces and the line used for the transport of troops and weapons. During the occupation (and especially during German withdrawal in 1944), the network was severely damaged by both the German army and Greek resistance groups. The track and rolling stock replacement took time following the civil war, with normal service levels resumed around 1948. In 1970 OSE became the legal successor to the SEK, taking over responsibilities for most of Greece's rail infrastructure. On 1 January 1971, the station and most of the Greek rail infrastructure was transferred to the Hellenic Railways Organisation S.A., a state-owned corporation. In 1983 the station was rebuilt, reaping on 27 October of that year. The line was converted to diesel sometime before 1990. In 1980, the routes (which had been called "Proastiakos" or "suburban" since 1978) were rolled out, and the number of services rose to 19 per day. Freight traffic declined sharply when the state-imposed monopoly of OSE for the transport of agricultural products and fertilisers ended in the early 1990s. Many small stations of the network with little passenger traffic were closed down.

In 1999 a new water fountain was instilled on platform 1, engraved with its date. In 2000 the station building was declared a listed monument by the Ministry of Culture. In 2001 the infrastructure element of OSE was created, known as GAIAOSE, it would henceforth be responsible for the maintenance of stations, bridges and other elements of the network, as well as the leasing and the sale of railway assists. In 2003, OSE launched "Proastiakos SA", as a subsidiary to serve the operation of the suburban network in the urban complex of Athens during the 2004 Olympic Games. In 2005, TrainOSE was created as a brand within OSE to concentrate on rail services and passenger interface. In 2008, all Athens Suburban Railway services were transferred from OSE to TrainOSE.

In 2008, the reconstruction of the station began in the context of the modernization of the Athens Suburban Railway network and its electric mobility. OSE's original intention was to transfer the use of the adjacent warehouse building as a new station and to lease the old station out. Following a protest from local authorities and society, the change of use of the station building was abolished but the transfer of the docks several meters from the station building progressed. Today the station is served by the Athens suburban railway to Athens. In 2009, with the Greek debt crisis unfolding OSE's Management was forced to reduce services across the network. Timetables were cutback and routes closed, as the government-run entity attempted to reduce overheads. In 2017 OSE's passenger transport sector was privatised as TrainOSE, currently a wholly owned subsidiary of Ferrovie dello Stato Italiane infrastructure, including stations, remained under the control of OSE. That same year on 30 July Line 3 of the Athens Suburban Railway began serving the station.

== Facilities ==
The ground-level station is assessed via stairs or a ramp. It has 2 side platforms, with the main station buildings located on the westbound platform. The booking office is (as of 2025) open and staffed. The Station is housed in the original stone-built station. The station used to have a buffet, as evidenced by former illuminated signage on platform 1, but now only vending machines are in place; at platform level, there are sheltered seating and Dot-matrix display departure and arrival screens and timetable poster boards on both platforms. There is a taxi rank, parking in the forecourt, and bus connections from across the road.

== Services ==
Since 22 November 2025, the following weekday services call at this station:

- Athens Suburban Railway Line A3 towards Athens, with up to one train every two hours, plus one extra train during the weekday afternoon peak.

== Station layout ==
Ground level	Customer service	Exit/Tickets
Level; Ε1	Side platform, doors will open on the right
Level; Ε1	Platform 1	to Athens (Avlida) ←
Level; Ε1	Platform 2	to Athens (Avlida) ←
Level; Ε1	Side platform, doors will open on the right/left
Level; Ε1	Platform 3	Not in use

== Gallery ==
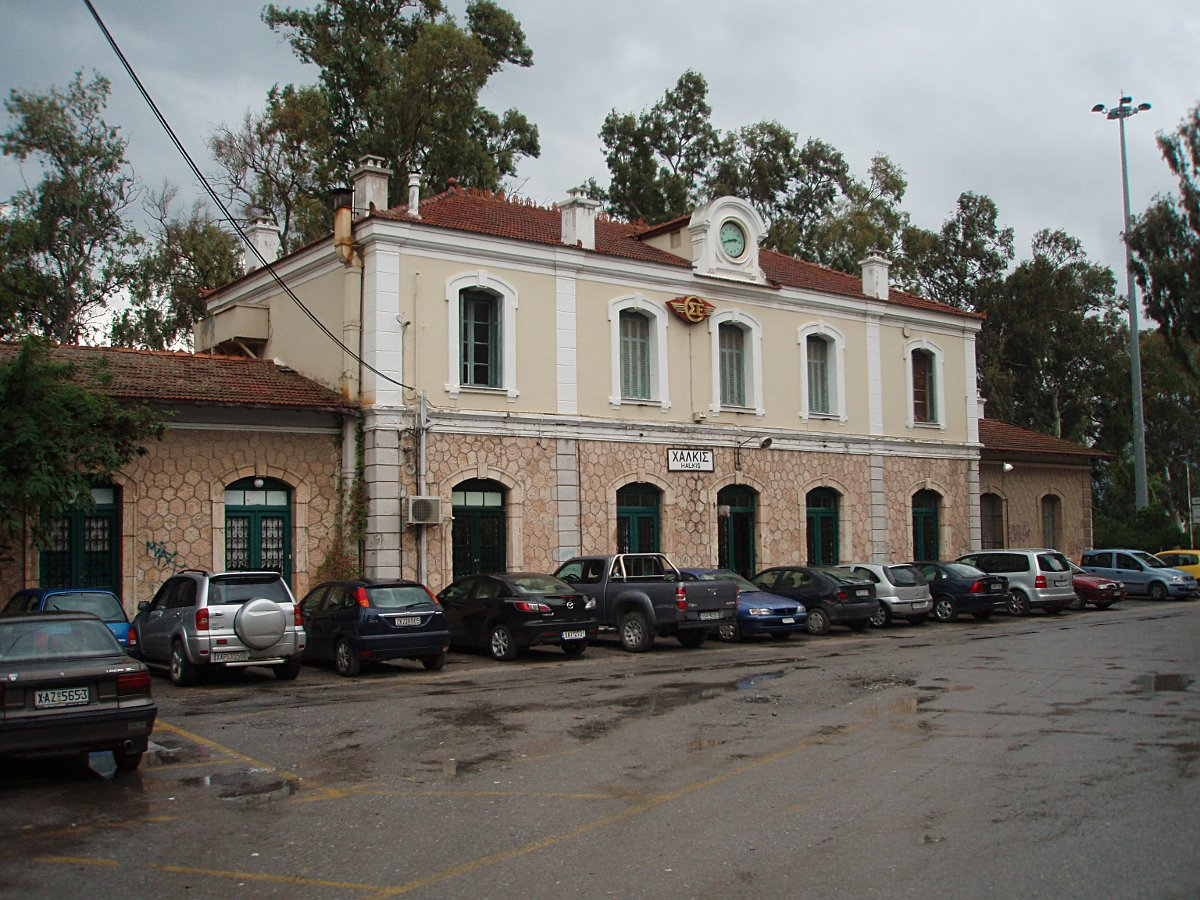
The station forecourt and old station building

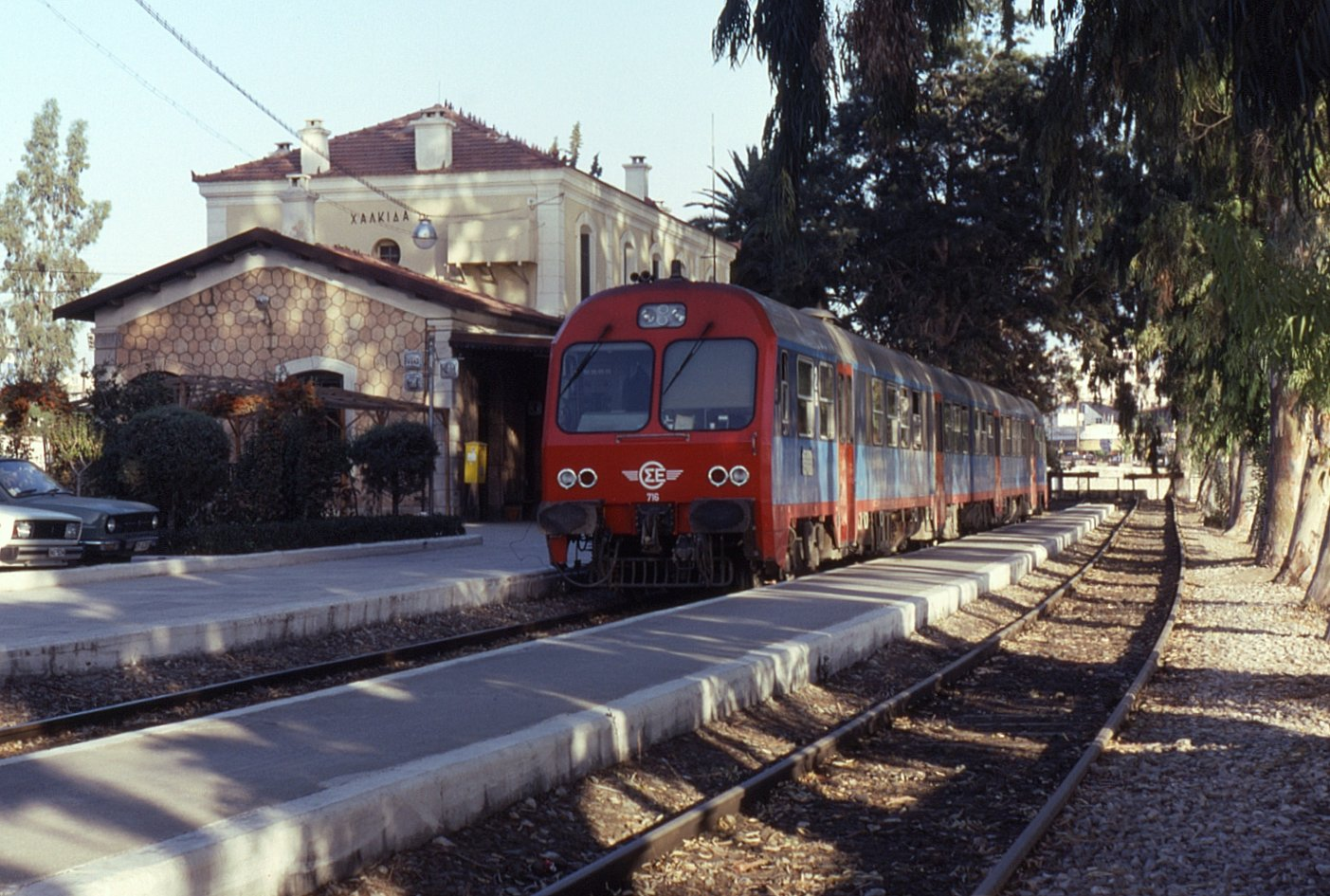
The station November 1992

== See also ==
- Railway stations in Greece
- Hellenic Railways Organization
- Hellenic Train
- Proastiakos
