= Tanagra railway station =

Railway station in Boeotia, Greece

Τανάγρα Tanagra

General information
- Location: 320 09 Schimatari; Boeotia; Greece
- Coordinates: 38°20′24″N 23°34′53″E
- Owner: GAIAOSE
- Operator: Hellenic Train
- Line: Piraeus–Platy railway
- Platforms: 2?
- Tracks: 2
- Train operators: Hellenic Train

Construction
- Structure type: at-grade
- Platform levels: 1
- Parking: Yes
- Cycle facilities: No

Other information
- Website: http://www.ose.gr/en/

History
- Opened: 2016?
- Electrified: 25 kV 50 Hz AC

Services
Preceding station	Hellenic Train	Following station
Oinoi towards Athens	G1 Athens-Leianokladi via Bralos	Thebes towards Leianokladi
Location
- Location within Greece

Tanagra railway station (Greek: Σιδηροδρομικός σταθμός Τανάγρας, romanized: Sidirodromikós stathmós Tanagra) is the railway station the serves the town of Schimatari and nearby Tanagra 6.3 kilometres (3.9 mi) in Boeotia, Greece. It is situated just off the junction of the Piraeus–Platy railway and the branch line to Chalcis (Oinoi–Chalcis railway), however, neither of these services call at the station. It is owned by GAIAOSE, but services are provided by Hellenic Train, with Regional services. Today Hellenic Train operates just 2 daily Regional trains to Athens and Leianokladi. The station lies close to an airforce base. The station is close to Tanagra airforce base.

== History ==
The station opened in 2016. Despite its name, the station only serves the settlement of Schimatari. In July 2022, the station began being served by Hellenic Train, the rebranded TranOSE.

In September 2023, due in part to storm Danial services were severely disrupted between Oinoi - Tithorea when power was disrupted on that section of line, which led to long delays thought the evening.

On 1 July 2025, Hellenic Train took the decision closed the staffed ticket offices. The local government of Levadia strongly criticised the move, calling it unacceptable as it reduces service quality and makes travel harder for elderly passengers, people with disabilities, and those without access to digital ticketing. Mayor Dimitris Karamanis described the station as having an “image of abandonment”: no waiting hall with air-conditioning, non-functioning toilets, with other rooms just locked up. The Municipality representatives have requested a meeting with the management of Hellenic Train and the decision be reversed, for the station to be staffed properly, and for broader improvements to services, timetables, and infrastructure and reserves the right to take any appropriate action to defend the rights of its citizens.

On 14 September 2025, at 05:45 Hellenic Railways informed passengers that due to a technical problem, services would be disrupted between Thebes and Davleia railway station. The disruption, which Hellenic Railways reported was due to damage to communication systems was reperiad in less than 18 hours.

The station buildings are owned by GAIAOSE, which since 3 October 2001 owns most railway stations in Greece: the company was also in charge of rolling stock from December 2014 until October 2025, when Greek Railways (the owner of the Piraeus–Platy railway) took over that responsibility.

== Facilities ==
As of (2020) the station has waiting rooms.

== Service ==
The station is served by a-per of Regional services to Athens and Leianokladi, at 08:35 and 20:07 respectably.
