= Chaeronea railway station =

Railway station near Chaeronea, Greece

Χαιρώνεια Cheronia

General information
- Location: Chaeronea; Greece
- Coordinates: 38°24′30″N 22°58′57″E
- Owner: GAIAOSE
- Line: Piraeus–Platy railway
- Platforms: 2
- Tracks: 2
- Train operators: Hellenic Train

Construction
- Structure type: at-grade
- Platform levels: 1
- Parking: No
- Cycle facilities: No

Other information
- Website: http://www.ose.gr/en/

History
- Opened: 8 March 1904
- Electrified: 25 kV AC, 50 Hz

Services
| Preceding station | Hellenic Train | Following station |
|---|---|---|
| Livadeia towards Athens | G1 Athens-Leianokladi via Bralos | Davleia towards Leianokladi |
Location
- Location within Greece

Chaeronea railway station (Greek: Σιδηροδρομικός Σταθμός Χαιρώνειας, romanized: Sidirodromikós stathmós Cheroneia) is a railway station situated 1.7 kilometres (1.1 mi) north of Chaeronea, Greece. The station opened on 8 March 1904. It is served by local trains to Athens and Leianokladi.

== History ==
The station opened on 8 March 1904.. In 1920 Hellenic State Railways or SEK was established, and the line became part of the network. During the Axis occupation of Greece (1941–44), Athens was controlled by German military fourses, and the line used for the transport of troops and weapons. During the occupation (and especially during German withdrawal in 1944), the network was severely damaged by both the German army and Greek resistance groups. The track and rolling stock replacement took time following the civil war, with normal service levels resumed around 1948.

In 1970 OSE became the legal successor to the SEK, taking over responsibilities for most of Greece's rail infrastructure. On 1 January 1971, the station and most of the Greek rail infrastructure was transferred to the Hellenic Railways Organisation S.A., a state-owned corporation. Freight traffic declined sharply when the state-imposed monopoly of OSE for the transport of agricultural products and fertilisers ended in the early 1990s. Many small stations of the network with little passenger traffic were closed down. It was during this time that buslike shelters were installed on both platforms.

In 2001 the infrastructure element of OSE was created, known as GAIAOSE; it would henceforth be responsible for the maintenance of stations, bridges and other elements of the network, as well as the leasing and the sale of railway assists. In 2005, TrainOSE was created as a brand within OSE to concentrate on rail services and passenger interface. In 2009, with the Greek debt crisis unfolding OSE's Management was forced to reduce services across the network. Timetables were cutback and routes closed, as the government-run entity attempted to reduce overheads. In 2017 OSE's passenger transport sector was privatised as TrainOSE, (Now Hellenic Train) currently, a wholly owned subsidiary of Ferrovie dello Stato Italiane infrastructure, including stations, remained under the control of OSE. In July 2022, the station began being served by Hellenic Train, the rebranded TranOSE.

== Facilities ==
The station is little more than two side platforms, with no sheltered seating or other facilities. Currently, there is no local bus stop connecting the station.

== Services ==
It is served by Regional services between Athens and Leianokladi. The station sees around 2 trains per-day.

There is also a Bus service run by Hellenic Train that connects the station with Oinoi.

| Level; L1 | Side platform, doors will open on the right |
| Level; L1 | Platform 1 | towards Leianokladi (Davleia) ← |
| Level; L1 | Platform 2 | towards Athens (Livadeia) → |
| Level; L1 | Side platform, doors will open on the right |

== See also ==
- Railway stations in Greece
- Hellenic Railways Organization
- Hellenic Train
- P.A.Th.E./P.
