= Thebes railway station =

Railway station in Boeotia, Greece

Θήβα Thiva

General information
- Location: Thiva 322 00; Boeotia; Greece
- Coordinates: 38°19′47″N 23°19′06″E
- Owner: GAIAOSE
- Operator: Hellenic Train
- Line: Piraeus–Platy railway
- Platforms: 5 (3 in regular use)
- Tracks: 5

Construction
- Structure type: at-grade
- Platform levels: 1
- Parking: Yes
- Cycle facilities: Yes (#2)

Other information
- Website: http://www.ose.gr/en/

History
- Opened: 8 March 1904; 122 years ago
- Electrified: 25 kV 50 Hz AC

Services
Preceding station	Hellenic Train	Following station
Oinoi towards Athens	C1 Athens-Thessaloniki	Livadeia towards Thessaloniki
Oinoi towards Athens	C2 Athens-Kalambaka	Aliartos towards Kalambaka
Tanagra towards Athens	G1 Athens-Leianokladi via Bralos	Aliartos towards Leianokladi
Location
- Location within Greece

Thebes railway station (Greek: Σιδηροδρομικός σταθμός Θήβας, romanized: Sidirodromikós stathmós Thiva) is the main railway station of Thebes in Boeotia, Greece. Located 900 m from the center of Thebes, The station is served by Intercity trains between Athens and Thessaloniki.

== History ==
The station was opened on 8 March 1904. In 1970 OSE became the legal successor to the SEK, taking over responsibilities for most of Greece's rail infrastructure.

In 2001 the infrastructure element of OSE was created, known as GAIAOSE; it would henceforth be responsible for the maintenance of stations, bridges and other elements of the network, as well as the leasing and the sale of railway assists. In 2005, TrainOSE was created as a brand within OSE to concentrate on rail services and passenger interface.

In 2009, with the Greek debt crisis unfolding OSE's Management was forced to reduce services across the network. Timetables were cut back and routes closed, as the government-run entity attempted to reduce overheads. In 2017 OSE's passenger transport sector was privatised as TrainOSE, currently a wholly owned subsidiary of Ferrovie dello Stato Italiane infrastructure, including stations, remained under the control of OSE.

In July 2022, the station began being served by Hellenic Train, the rebranded TranOSE

In September 2023, due in part to storm Danial services were severely disrupted between Oinoi - Tithorea when power was disrupted on that section of line, which led to long delays thought the evening.

On 14 September 2025, at 05:45 Hellenic Railways informed passengers that due to a technical problem, services would be disrupted between Thebes and Davleia railway station. The disruption, which Hellenic Railways reported was due to damage to communication systems was reperiad in less than 18 hours.

The station building is owned by GAIAOSE, which since 3 October 2001 owns most railway stations in Greece: the company was also in charge of rolling stock from December 2014 until October 2025, when Greek Railways (the owner of the Piraeus–Platy railway) took over that responsibility.

== Facilities ==
The ground-level station is located via stairs or a ramp. It has 5 island platforms, with the main station buildings located on the southbound platform. As of (2021) the station has waiting shelters on the platforms and a staffed booking office, As well as is a baggage claim in the adjoining building. The station has a buffet. At platform level, there are sheltered seating, Dot-matrix display departure or arrival screens and timetable poster boards on all the platforms. There are currently no lifts, however, stairs are available to both used raised Island platform's. The station is equipped with a small car park, taxi rank, and bus stop on the forecourt at the entrance to the station.

== Services ==
It is served by Regional, Express and Intercity services between Athens, Kalambaka, Leianokladi and Thessaloniki. The station sees around 16 trains per-day.

== Line layout ==
L Ground/Concourse	Customer service	Shops/Buffet	Tickets/Exits
Level; Ε1	Side platform, doors will open on the right
Level; Ε1	Platform 1	towards Athens (Tanagra) ←
Level; Ε1	Platform 2	towards Thessaloniki (Aliartos) →
Level; Ε1	Island platform, doors open on the right/left
Level; Ε1	Platform 3	towards Athens (Oinoi) ←
Level; Ε1	Platform 4	In non-regular use
Level; Ε1	Island platform, doors open on the right/left
Level; Ε1	Platform 5	In non-regular use

== See also ==
- Hellenic Railways Organization
- Hellenic Train
- P.A.Th.E./P.
