= Livadeia railway station =

Railway station in Livadia Municipality, Greece

Λιβαδειά Livadeia
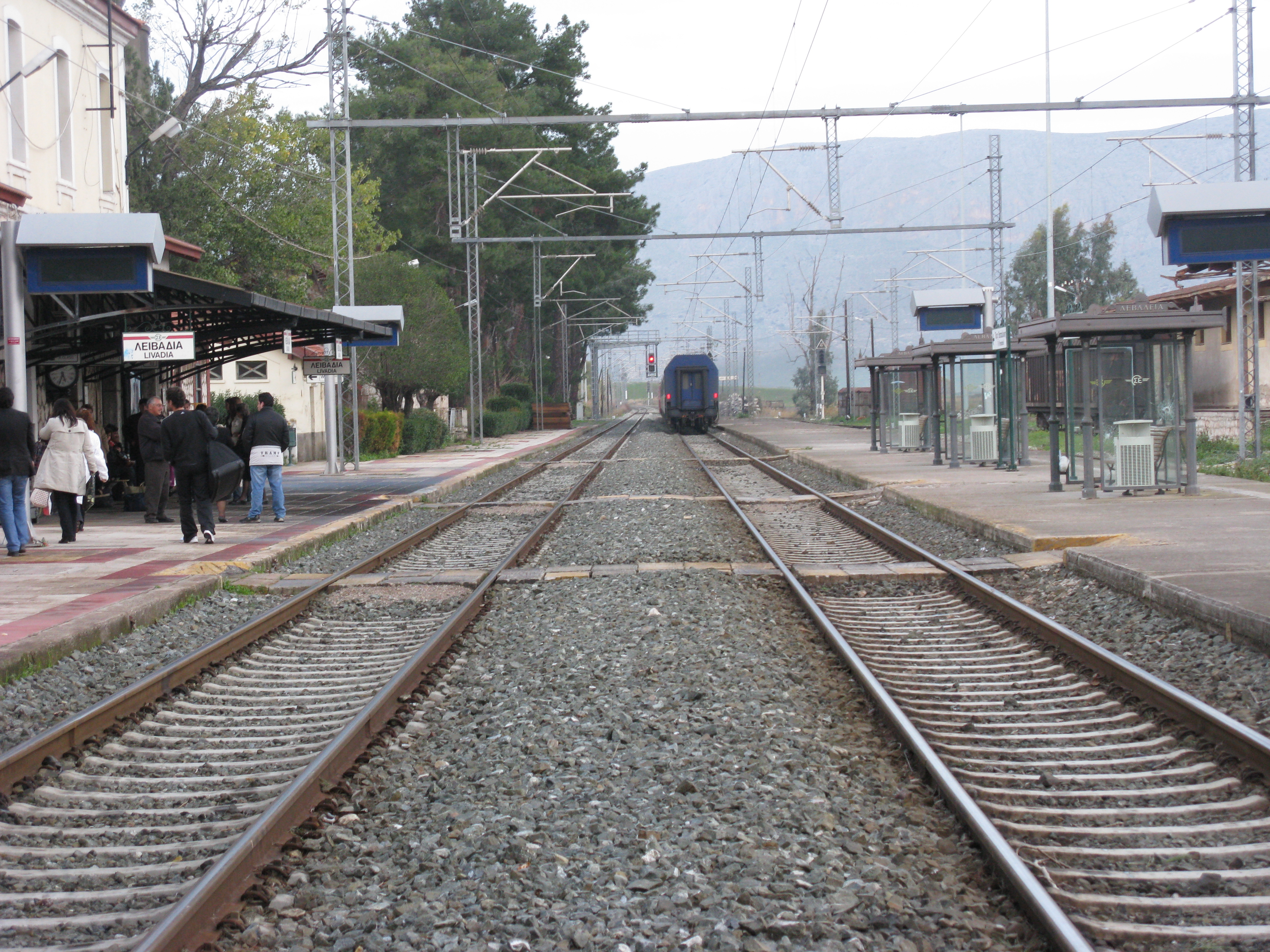
- Livadeia railway station, 2 December 2008.

General information
- Location: Livadeia 321 00; Boeotia; Greece
- Coordinates: 38°28′14″N 22°55′36″E
- Owner: GAIAOSE
- Operator: Hellenic Train
- Line: Piraeus–Platy railway
- Platforms: 2
- Tracks: 3
- Train operators: Hellenic Train

Construction
- Structure type: at-grade
- Platform levels: 1

Other information
- Website: http://www.ose.gr/en/

History
- Opened: 8 March 1904; 122 years ago
- Closed: 2016
- Rebuilt: 15 December 2017; 8 years ago
- Electrified: 25 kV 50 Hz AC

Services
Preceding station	Hellenic Train	Following station
Aliartos towards Athens	C1 Athens-Thessaloniki	Tithorea towards Thessaloniki
Thebes towards Athens	C2 Athens-Kalambaka	Tithorea towards Kalambaka
Alalkomenes towards Athens	G1 Athens-Leianokladi via Bralos	Chaeronea towards Leianokladi
Location
- Location within Greece

Livadeia railway station (Greek: Σιδηροδρομικός Σταθμός Λιβαδειάς, romanized: Sidirodromikós stathmós Livadeias) is a railway station close to Livadeia, Boeotia, Greece. The station opened on 8 March 1904., along with the rest of the line. It is served by intercity trains between Athens and Thessaloniki and by regional trains to Kalampaka.

== History ==
The station opened on 8 March 1904., along with the rest of the line. In 1920 the line became part of the Hellenic State Railways. In 1971, the Hellenic State Railways was reorganised into the OSE taking over responsibilities for most of Greece's rail infrastructure. In 2001 the infrastructure element of OSE was created, known as GAIAOSE; it would henceforth be responsible for the maintenance of stations, bridges and other elements of the network, as well as the leasing and the sale of railway assists. In 2005, TrainOSE was created as a brand within OSE to concentrate on rail services and passenger interface. The station closed in 2016 for renovations and track upgrades. On 20 February 2017, TRAINOSE announced the start of the pilot Athens Suburban Railway route for Athens-Tithorea-Athens. While this service has yet to be implemented, local stopping services now call at Livadeia. The station reopened on 15 December 2017 and was officially inaugurated on 8 January 2018, at the same time as the rest of the Tithorea-Lianokladi section of the line In July 2022, the station began being served by Hellenic Train, the rebranded TranOSE.

In September 2023, due in part to storm Danial services were severely disrupted between Oinoi - Tithorea when power was disrupted on that section of line, which led to long delays thought the evening.

On 1 July 2025, Hellenic Train took the decision closed the staffed ticket offices. The local government of Levadia strongly criticised the move, calling it unacceptable as it reduces service quality and makes travel harder for elderly passengers, people with disabilities, and those without access to digital ticketing. Mayor Dimitris Karamanis described the station as having an “image of abandonment”: no waiting hall with air-conditioning, non-functioning toilets, with other rooms just locked up. The Municipality representatives have requested a meeting with the management of Hellenic Train and the decision be reversed, for the station to be staffed properly, and for broader improvements to services, timetables, and infrastructure and reserves the right to take any appropriate action to defend the rights of its citizens.

On 14 September 2025, at 05:45 Hellenic Railways informed passengers that due to a technical problem, services would be disrupted between Thebes and Davleia railway station. The disruption, which Hellenic Railways reported was due to damage to communication systems was reperiad in less than 18 hours.

== Facilities ==
The station has waiting rooms and a staffed booking office within the original brick-built station building. Basic shelters are located on Platform 2, and digital display screens on both platforms. There is a taxi rank in the forecourt, with a postbox at the front entrance. However, there is no onsite parking at the station.

== Services ==
It is served by Regional and Intercity services between Athens, Kalambaka, Leianokladi and Thessaloniki. In February 2018 new services commenced between new Tithorea - Lianokladi high-speed line. The station sees around 16 trains per-day.

== Accidents and incidents ==
=== 2024 accident ===
On Saturday, 7 September 2024, a mother of three, who had attempted to disembark from a train at Livadeia station when the doors suddenly closed on her, trapping her between the closing doors. As the train departed, she was dragged along the platform for approximately 50 metres (160 ft). A former MP of Boeotia, Andreas Koutsoubas, witnessed the event, ran behind the train and shouted for the driver to stop. Thanks to this intervention, the train stopped and the woman, though shaken, suffered only minor injuries. Hellenic Train admitted that safety protocols were not followed and announced disciplinary measures along with additional staff training to prevent similar incidents. This event is seen as emblematic of broader safety shortcomings within the Greek railway system, especially deficiencies in staff training, protocol enforcement, and infrastructure—prompting calls for urgent systemic improvements.

== Station layout ==
L Ground/Concourse	Customer service	Tickets/Exits
Level; Ε1	Side platform, doors will open on the right
Level; Ε1	Platform 1	← towards Athens (Thebes)
Level; Ε1	Platform 2	towards Thessaloniki (Tithorea) →
Level; Ε1	Island platform, doors on the right/left
Level; Ε1	Platform 3	In non-regular use
