= Molos =

Molos Μώλος
- Municipal unit
- Location within the regional unit

- Location within Greece
- Coordinates: 38°48′N 22°39′E
- Country: Greece
- Administrative region: Central Greece
- Regional unit: Phthiotis
- Municipality: Kamena Vourla

Area
  - Municipal unit: 147.5 km^{2} (57.0 sq mi)

Population (2021)
  - Municipal unit: 3,611
  - Municipal unit density: 24.48/km^{2} (63.41/sq mi)
  - Community: 1,746
- Time zone: UTC+2 (EET)
  - Summer (DST): UTC+3 (EEST)
- Vehicle registration: ΜΙ

Molos (Greek: Μώλος, meaning “Jetty”) is a town and a former municipality in Phthiotis, Greece. Since the 2011 local government reform it has been a part of the municipality Kamena Vourla, of which it is a municipal unit. The municipal unit has an area of 147.510 km^{2} and a population of 3,611 in 2021. Molos is believed to be the site of the ancient town of Scarphe.

== Transport ==
The town is served by Molos railway station on the realigned Piraeus–Platy railway, which opened on 20 November 2022.
