= Molos railway station =

Railway station in Greece

Μώλος Molos

General information
- Location: 350 09 Molos; Greece
- Coordinates: 38.812330°N 22.657510°E
- Owner: GAIAOSE
- Operator: Hellenic Train
- Line: Piraeus–Platy railway
- Platforms: 2
- Tracks: 4 (2 non-stopping)
- Train operators: Hellenic Train

Construction
- Structure type: Embankment
- Platform levels: 1
- Parking: Yes

History
- Electrified: 25 kV 50 Hz AC

Key dates
- 20 November 2022: Opened

Services
Preceding station	Hellenic Train	Following station
Tithorea towards Athens	C2 Athens-Kalambaka	Leianokladi towards Kalambaka
Tithorea towards Athens	G1 Athens-Leianokladi via Bralos	Leianokladi Terminus
Location
- Location within Greece

Molos railway station (Greek: Σιδηροδρομικός Σταθμός Μώλος, romanized: Sidirodromikós stathmós Molos) is a railway station serving the town of Molos, Greece. This station is on the Tithorea–Lianokladi high-speed line, which opened on 1 February 2018. However, the station itself did not open until 20 November 2022, with the first train arriving at 10:30.

== History ==
The station opened on 20 November 2022, with the first train arriving at 10:30.

The station is owned by GAIAOSE, which since 3 October 2001 owns most railway stations in Greece: the company was also in charge of rolling stock from December 2014 until October 2025, when Greek Railways (the owner of the Piraeus–Platy railway) took over that responsibility.

== Facilities ==
The station is on an embankment, and consists of two side platforms and four tracks: the middle two tracks are for passing trains: a pedestrian subway connects the two platforms, both of which have step-free access via lifts.

== Services ==
It is served by intercity trains between Athens and Thessaloniki. As of 17 June 2023, there is one Hellenic Train Intercity service per day, one in each direction:

- IC 882, from Athens to Kalambaka
- IC 887, from Kalambaka to Athens
