= Angeies railway station =

Railway station in Greece

Αγγείαι Aggeiai

General information
- Location: Xiniada 350 10, Phthiotis; Greece
- Coordinates: 39°05′26″N 22°11′30″E
- Owner: GAIAOSE
- Operator: Hellenic Train
- Line: Piraeus–Platy railway
- Distance: 239 kilometres (149 mi) from Thessaloniki
- Platforms: 2
- Tracks: 2
- Train operators: Hellenic Train

Construction
- Structure type: at-grade
- Platform levels: 1
- Parking: No
- Cycle facilities: No

Other information
- Status: Unstaffed
- Website: http://www.ose.gr/en/

History
- Opened: 8 March 1904
- Electrified: 25 kV 50 Hz AC

Services
Preceding station	Hellenic Train	Following station
Leianokladi towards Athens	C2 Athens-Kalambaka	Domokos towards Kalambaka
Location
- Location within Greece

Angeies railway station (Greek: Σιδηροδρομικός Σταθμός Αγγειών, also Αγγείες or Αγγείαι) is a railway station situated near the village of Makryrrachi in Phthiotis, Greece. The station was opened on 8 March 1904.. It was served by intercity trains between Athens and Thessaloniki. In 2010 work started on a new station adjacent to the existing Angeies station on the new Athens–Thessaloniki high-speed line, with longer platforms and subway access for passengers. In June 2018, the old station, which included the original station buildings, closed when the new station came online; however, the older station is still intact and can be seen from platform 1. The station is served by trains between Athens, Kalampaka and Thessaloniki

The station is owned by GAIAOSE, which since 3 October 2001 owns most railway stations in Greece: the company was also in charge of rolling stock from December 2014 until October 2025, when Greek Railways (the owner of the Piraeus–Platy railway) took over that responsibility.
