= Leianokladi =

Leianokladi Λειανοκλάδι
- Municipal unit
- Location within the regional unit

- Location within Greece
- Coordinates: 38°55′N 22°18′E
- Country: Greece
- Administrative region: Central Greece
- Regional unit: Phthiotis
- Municipality: Lamia

Area
  - Municipal unit: 80.25 km^{2} (30.98 sq mi)

Population (2021)
  - Municipal unit: 1,807
  - Municipal unit density: 22.52/km^{2} (58.32/sq mi)
  - Community: 969
- Time zone: UTC+2 (EET)
  - Summer (DST): UTC+3 (EEST)
- Postal code: 351 00
- Area code: +30-2231
- Vehicle registration: MI

Leianokladi (Greek: Λειανοκλάδι) is a village and a former municipality in Phthiotis, Greece. Since the 2011 local government reform it is part of the municipality Lamia, of which it is a municipal unit. The municipal unit has an area of 80.252 km^{2}. Population 1,807 (2021). The Piraeus–Platy railway line passes through the Leianokladi railway station.
