= Oinoi railway station =

Railway station in Greece

Οινόη Oinoi
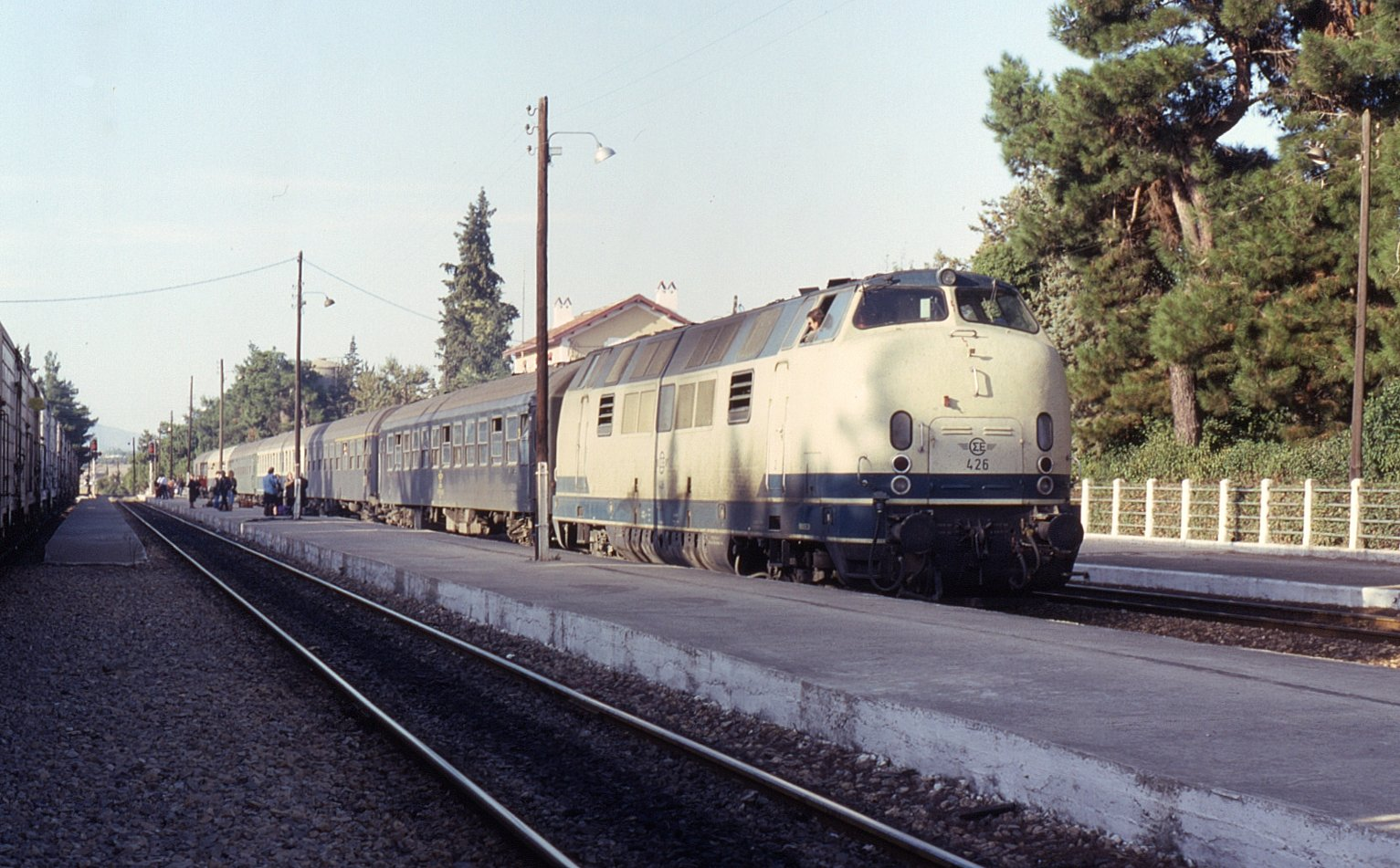
- The 20:05 Dikaia to Athens InterCity service (pulled by a Class A410 no. A426) waiting at Oinoi 7 November 1992

General information
- Location: 320 09 Oinoi; Boeotia; Greece
- Coordinates: 38°19′21″N 23°36′34″E
- Owner: GAIAOSE
- Operator: Hellenic Train
- Lines: Oinoi–Chalcis railway; Piraeus–Platy railway
- Platforms: 3
- Tracks: 6 (1 disused)

Construction
- Structure type: at-grade
- Platform levels: 1
- Parking: Yes
- Cycle facilities: No
- Accessible: Yes

Other information
- Status: Staffed
- Website: http://www.ose.gr/en/

History
- Former names: Schimatari

Key dates
- 8 March 1904: Line opened
- 29 June 1904: Station opened
- 30 July 2017: Line electrified

Services
Preceding station	Hellenic Train	Following station
Athens Terminus	C1 Athens-Thessaloniki	Thebes towards Thessaloniki
Acharnes (SKA) towards Athens	C2 Athens-Kalambaka	Thebes towards Kalambaka
Acharnes (SKA) towards Athens	G1 Athens-Leianokladi via Bralos	Tanagra towards Leianokladi
Preceding station	Suburban Rail	Following station
Oinofyta towards Athens	Line A3	Dilesi towards Chalcis
Location

Oinoi railway station (Greek: Σιδηροδρομικός σταθμός Οινόης, romanized: Sidirodromikós stathmós Oinois) is a station on the Piraeus–Platy railway line in Oinoi in Boeotia, Greece. Located near the A1 motorway, and a short distance south of Oinoi. It is situated at the junction of the main Piraeus–Platy railway and the branch line to Chalcis (Oinoi–Chalcis railway). It is served by InterCity trains between Athens and Thessaloniki, and by Athens Suburban Railway services to Chalcis.

== History ==
The station opened on 29 June 1904 as a junction of the Oinoi–Chalcis line and Piraeus, Demerli & Frontiers Railway. In 1920 the station and most of the standard gauge railways in Greece came under the control of the Hellenic State Railways (SEK). In 1970 OSE became the legal successor to the SEK, taking over responsibilities for most of Greece's rail infrastructure. On 1 January 1971, the station and most of the Greek rail infrastructure were transferred to the Hellenic Railways Organisation S.A., a state-owned corporation. Freight traffic declined sharply when the state-imposed monopoly of OSE for the transport of agricultural products and fertilisers ended in the early 1990s. Many small stations of the network with little passenger traffic were closed down.

In 2001 the infrastructure element of OSE was created, known as GAIAOSE; it would henceforth be responsible for the maintenance of stations, bridges and other elements of the network, as well as the leasing and the sale of railway assists. In 2003, OSE launched "Proastiakos SA", as a subsidiary to serve the operation of the suburban network in the urban complex of Athens during the 2004 Olympic Games. In 2005, TrainOSE was created as a brand within OSE to concentrate on rail services and passenger interface. In 2008, all Athens Suburban Railway services were transferred from OSE to TrainOSE.

In 2009, with the Greek debt crisis unfolding OSE's Management was forced to reduce services across the network. Timetables were cutback and routes closed, as the government-run entity attempted to reduce overheads. In 2017 OSE's passenger transport sector was privatised as TrainOSE, currently a wholly owned subsidiary of Ferrovie dello Stato Italiane infrastructure, including stations, remained under the control of OSE. In July 2022, the station began being served by Hellenic Train, the rebranded TrainOSE.

In September 2023, due in part to storm Danial services were severely disrupted between Oinoi - Tithorea when power was disrupted on that section of line, which led to long delays thought the evening.

The station is owned by GAIAOSE, which since 3 October 2001 owns most railway stations in Greece: the company was also in charge of rolling stock from December 2014 until October 2025, when Greek Railways (the owner of the Oinoi–Chalcis and Piraeus–Platy railways) took over that responsibility.

== Facilities ==
The ground-level station is assessed via stairs or a ramp. It has 1 side platform and 2 island platforms, with the main station buildings located on the eastbound platform, (As of 2020) the station has a staffed booking office, a buffet, as well as toilets and waiting shelters are available, with access to the platforms by stairs or lifts. The Station is housed in the original stone-built station (Now closed) At platform level, there are sheltered seating and Dot-matrix display departure and arrival screens and timetable poster boards on platform 1, with platform shelters on the island platforms. There is a car park at the station and a taxi rank on the forecourt.

== Services ==
Since 15 May 2022, the following weekday services call at this station:

- InterCity (IC): five trains per day in each direction, between Athens and Thessaloniki;
- Express: one train per day in each direction, between Athens and Kalambaka;
- Regional: one train per day in each direction, between Athens and Leianokladi;
- Athens Suburban Railway Line A3 between Athens and Chalcis, with up to one train every two hours, plus one extra train during the weekday afternoon peak.

== Station layout ==
L Ground/Concourse	Customer service	Tickets/Exits
Level; L1	Through Lines	Not in use
Level; L1	Platform 3	to Chalcis (Dílesi) →
Level; L1	Island platform, doors will open on the right
Level; L1	Platform 1Α	← Intercity to Athens Acharnes (SKA)
Level; L1	Platform 1B	← to Athens (Oinofyta)
Level; L1	Platform 2Α	Intercity to Thessaloniki (Thebes) →
Level; L1	Platform 2B	to Chalcis (Dílesi) →
Level; L1	Side platform, doors will open on the right

== See also ==
- Hellenic Railways Organization
- Hellenic Train
- Proastiakos
- P.A.Th.E./P.
