= Tithorea railway station =

Station in Phthiotis, Central Greece

Τιθορέα Tithorea
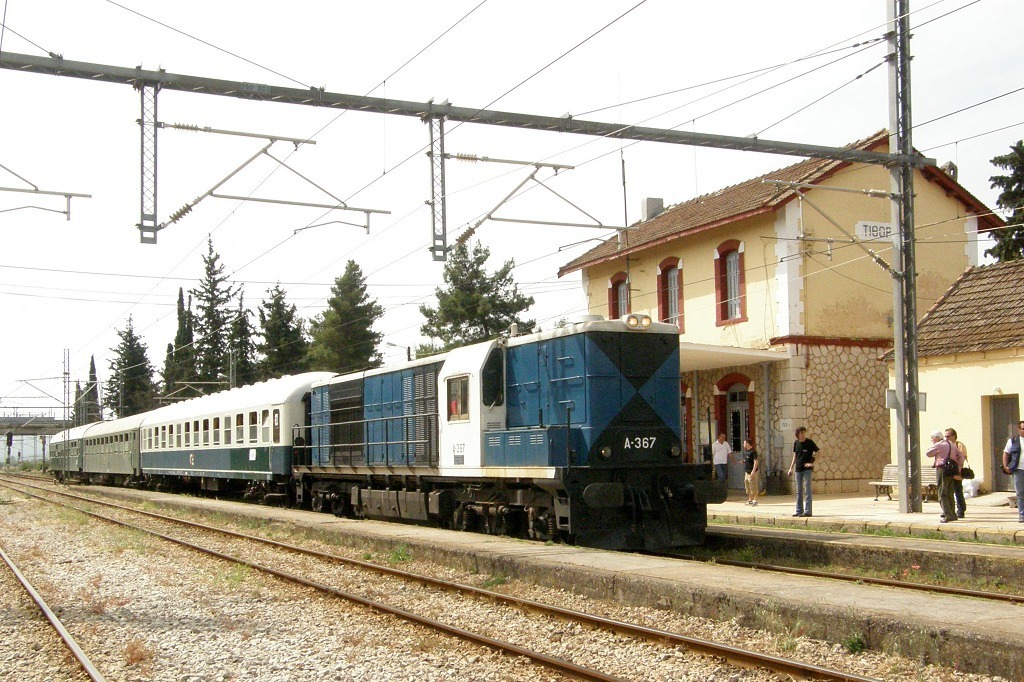
- Preserved Alstom diesel locomotive A-367 of OSE at Tithorea station before 2016 renovations, May 2008

General information
- Location: 350 15 Tithorea; Greece
- Coordinates: 38°36′30″N 22°43′07″E
- Owner: GAIAOSE
- Operator: Hellenic Train
- Line: Piraeus–Platy railway
- Platforms: 3
- Tracks: 6
- Train operators: Hellenic Train

Construction
- Structure type: at-grade
- Platform levels: 1
- Parking: Yes

Other information
- Status: Staffed
- Website: ose.gr/en

History
- Opened: 8 March 1904; 122 years ago
- Rebuilt: 2016-17
- Electrified: 25 kV 50 Hz AC

Services
Preceding station	Hellenic Train	Following station
Livadeia towards Athens	C1 Athens-Thessaloniki	Leianokladi towards Thessaloniki
Livadeia towards Athens	C2 Athens-Kalambaka	Molos towards Kalambaka
Kifisos towards Athens	G1 Athens-Leianokladi via Bralos	Molos towards Leianokladi
Location
- Location within Greece

Tithorea railway station (Greek: Σιδηροδρομικός Σταθμός Τιθορέας, romanized: Sidirodromikós stathmós Tithoréas) is a railway station that serves the town of Kato Tithorea in Phthiotis. Located around 450 metres (1,480 ft) east of the town centre, the station opened on 8 March 1904. by the (who), (now part of OSE). Today TrainOSE operates around 12 trains local and InterCity services to Athens, Palaiofarsalos and Thessaloniki. The station is staffed with waiting rooms available.

== History ==
The station opened on 8 March 1904., along with the rest of the line. In 1920 the line became part of the Hellenic State Railways. In 1971, the Hellenic State Railways was reorganised into the OSE taking over responsibilities for most of Greece's rail infrastructure. In 2001 the infrastructure element of OSE was created, known as GAIAOSE; it would henceforth be responsible for the maintenance of stations, bridges and other elements of the network, as well as the leasing and the sale of railway assists. In 2005, TrainOSE was created as a brand within OSE to concentrate on rail services and passenger interface. The station closed in 2016 for renovations and track upgrades. On 20 February 2017, TrainOSE announced the start of the pilot Athens Suburban Railway route for Athens-Tithorea-Athens. While this service has yet to be implemented, local stopping services now call at Tithorea. The station reopened on 15 December 2017 and was officially inaugurated on 8 January 2018, at the same time as the rest of the Tithorea-Lianokladi section of the line In July 2022, the station began being served by Hellenic Train, the rebranded TranOSE

In September 2023, due in part to storm Danial services were severely disrupted between Oinoi - Tithorea when power was disrupted on that section of line, which led to long delays thought the evening.

== Facilities ==
The station was renovated in the period 2016–2017, with the construction of a new underground passage, shelters on the platforms, and elevators, as well as with the improvement work to the station buildings and the installation of both a modern PA system and electronic timetable boards.

== Services ==
It is served by intercity trains between Athens and Thessaloniki. In February 2018 new services commenced on the new Tithorea - Lianokladi high-speed line.

== Accidents and incidents ==
An intercity passenger train derailed in Tithorea, Greece, on 11 September 1994. Five people were killed. A preliminary report stated that the cause of the accident was excessive speed.

== Station layout ==
L Ground/Concourse	Customer service	Tickets/Exits
Level; Ε1	Side platform, doors will open on the right
Level; Ε1	Platform 1	← towards Athens (Livadeia)
Level; Ε1	Platform 2	towards Thessaloniki (Leianokladi) →
Level; Ε1	Island platform, doors on the right/left
Level; Ε1	Platform 3	In non-regular use

== Gallery ==
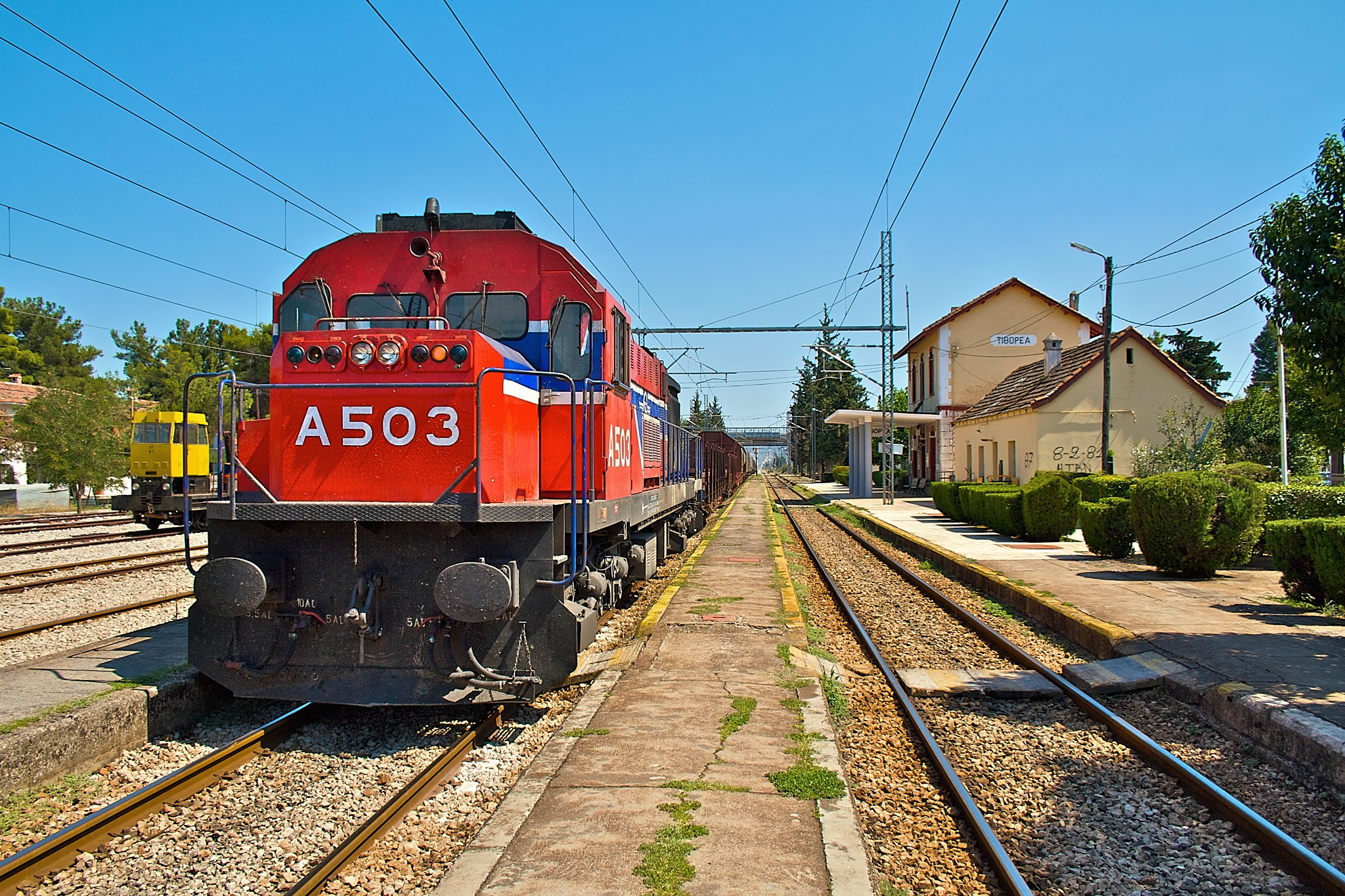

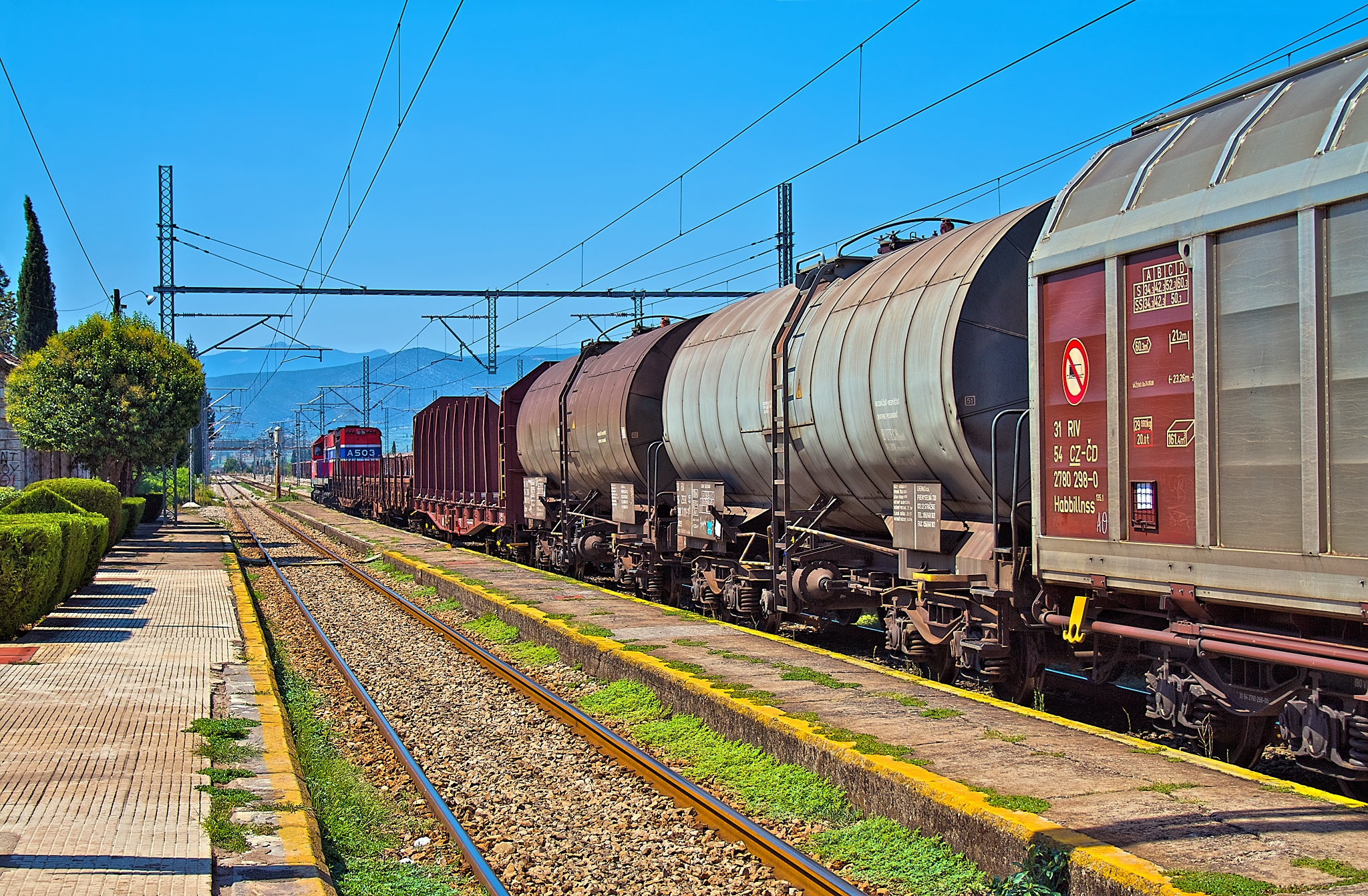

== See also ==
- Hellenic Railways Organization
- Hellenic Train
- P.A.Th.E./P.
