= Leianokladi railway station =

Railway station in Leianokladi, Greece

Λιανοκλάδι Lianokladi
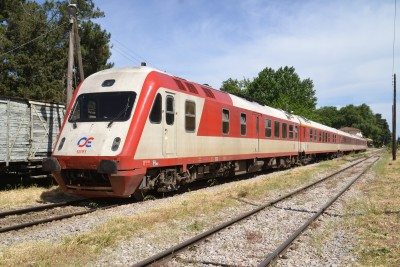
- 520 series train car in Leianokladi, 2015

General information
- Location: Leianokladi, 351 00; Phthiotis; Greece
- Coordinates: 38°53′26″N 22°22′22″E
- Owner: GAIAOSE
- Operator: Hellenic Train
- Lines: Piraeus–Platy railway; Leianokladi–Stylida railway
- Platforms: 10
- Tracks: 14 (6 sidings)
- Train operators: Hellenic Train

Construction
- Structure type: at-grade
- Platform levels: 2
- Parking: Yes
- Cycle facilities: No

Other information
- Status: Staffed
- Website: www.ose.gr/en/

History
- Opened: 8 March 1904
- Closed: 2015
- Rebuilt: 2014/2016
- Electrified: 25 kV 50 Hz AC

Services
Preceding station	Hellenic Train	Following station
Tithorea towards Athens	C1 Athens-Thessaloniki	Palaiofarsalos towards Thessaloniki
Molos towards Athens	C2 Athens-Kalambaka	Angeies towards Kalambaka
Molos towards Athens	G1 Athens-Leianokladi via Bralos	Terminus
Terminus	G2 Leianokladi-Stylida	Lamia Music School towards Stylida
Location
- Location within Greece

Leianokladi railway station (Greek: Σιδηροδρομικός Σταθμός Λιανοκλαδίου, romanized: Sidirodromikós stathmós Leianokladíou) is a railway station situated between Lamia and Leianokladi in Phthiotis, Greece. The station opened on 8 March 1904 It is situated at the junction of the main Athens-Thessaloniki line with the branch line to Lamia and Stylida. It is served by intercity trains between Athens and Thessaloniki and by local trains to Stylida.

== History ==
The station opened on 8 March 1904, along with the rest of the line. In 1920 Hellenic State Railways or SEK was established; however, many railways, such as the SPAP, continued to be run as a separate company. In 1970 OSE became the legal successor to the SEK, taking over responsibilities for most of Greece's rail infrastructure. On 1 January 1971, the station and most of the Greek rail infrastructure were transferred to the Hellenic Railways Organisation S.A., a state-owned corporation. Freight traffic declined sharply when the state-imposed monopoly of OSE for the transport of agricultural products and fertilisers ended in the early 1990s. Many small stations of the network with little passenger traffic were closed down.

In 2001 the infrastructure element of OSE was created, known as GAIAOSE; it would henceforth be responsible for the maintenance of stations, bridges and other elements of the network, as well as the leasing and the sale of railway assists. In 2005, the station was closed for major upgrades to allow the new suburban railway to use the station. That same year, in 2005, TrainOSE was created as a brand within OSE to concentrate on rail services and passenger interface.

In 2009, with the Greek debt crisis unfolding OSE's Management was forced to reduce services across the network. Timetables were cutback and routes closed, as the government-run entity attempted to reduce overheads. In 2014 work began to update and expand the station. The station closed in 2016 for renovations and track upgrades. The station reopened on 15 December 2017 and was officially inaugurated on 8 January 2018, at the same time as the rest of the Tithorea-Lianokladi section of the line In 2017 OSE's passenger transport sector was privatised as TrainOSE (Now known as Hellenic Train), a wholly owned subsidiary of Ferrovie dello Stato Italiane infrastructure, including stations, remained under the control of OSE. In 2021 OSE commented that the line from The Tithorea to Lianokladi was vital for both locals and tourists, seeming to guarantee its future and further expansion, a view welcomed by Giannis Oikonomou Member of Parliament for Fthiotida and Deputy Minister of Rural Development and Food. In July 2022, the station began being served by Hellenic Train, the rebranded TranOSE.

== Facilities ==
The station is still housed in a 20th-century brick-built station building, with a new extension completed after 2016. The station has a buffet. Access to the station is via steps or ramp. The Station buildings are also equipped with toilets and a staffed ticket office. The new station buildings enclose the older buildings with new roofing, built from 0.8mm thick pre-oxidized titanium zinc, with an area 6,400m² with a coating of suspended ceilings with corrugated sheet metal 0.7mm (5,000m²) thick. Access to the platforms is via a subway under the lines, via stairs or escalator, with wheelchair accessible by elevator. At platform level, there are sheltered seating in a new air-conditioned indoor passenger shelter and Dot-matrix display departure and arrival screens or timetable poster boards on all platforms. There is a small car park on-site, adjacent to the eastbound line. Currently, there is no local bus stop connecting the station.

== Services ==
It is served by intercity trains between Athens and Thessaloniki. In February 2018 new services commenced on the new Tithorea - Lianokladi high-speed line.

In May 2022, it was reported that station would be excluded from the morning stopping service, served by ETR 470 trains. However, by June 2022 TRAINOSE reported a new service can be called Intercity Premium and make the stops provided for in the intercity (Athens, Oinoi, Thebes, Levadia, Tithorea, Lianokladi, Palaiofarsalos, Larissa, Katerini, Platy, Thessaloniki) with rolling stock ETR470 and a price equivalent to Intercity Express. If the required conditions are met, the new service was due to be implemented in October 2022.

== Gallery ==
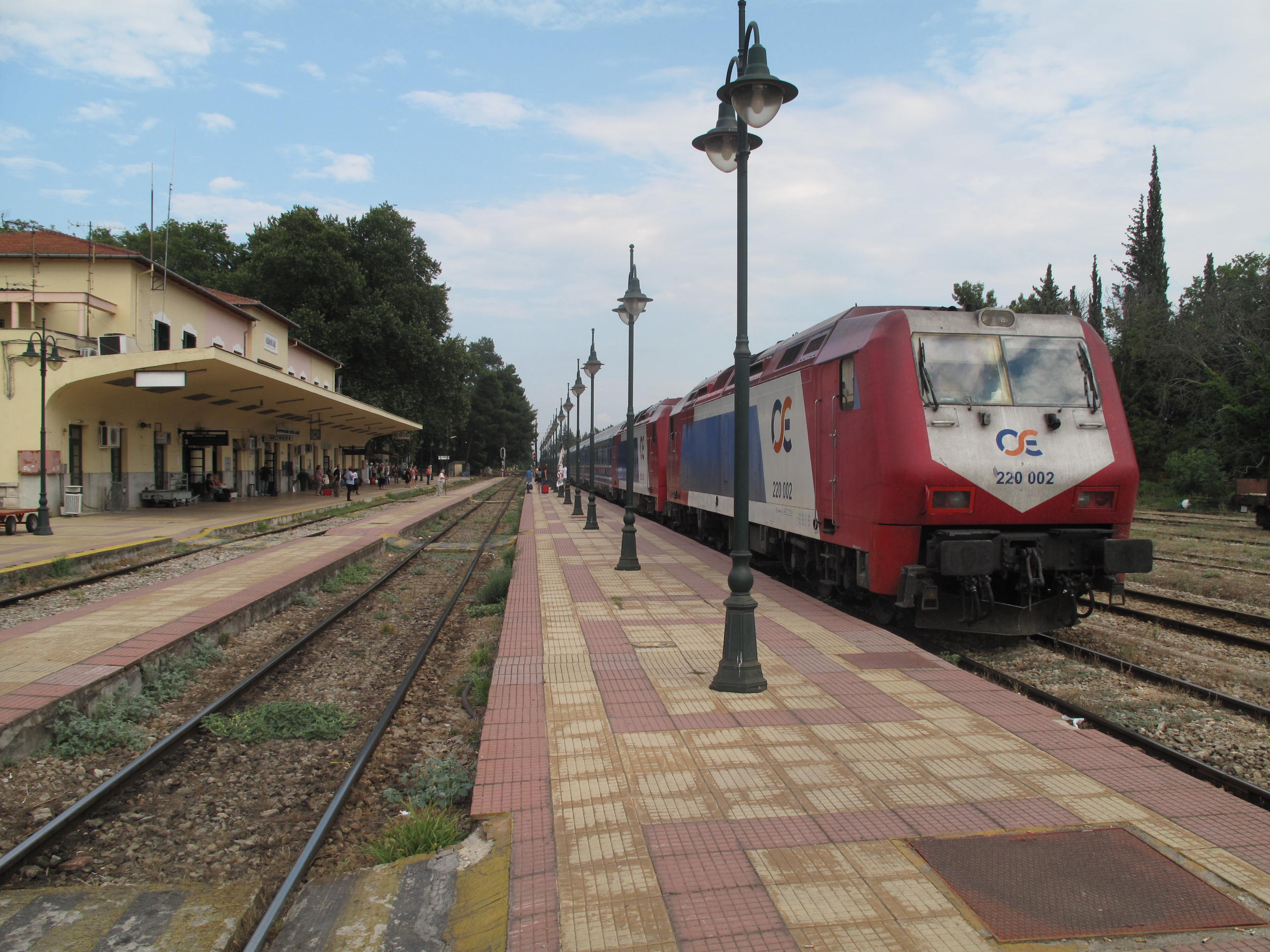
Leianokladi Station before refurbishment.

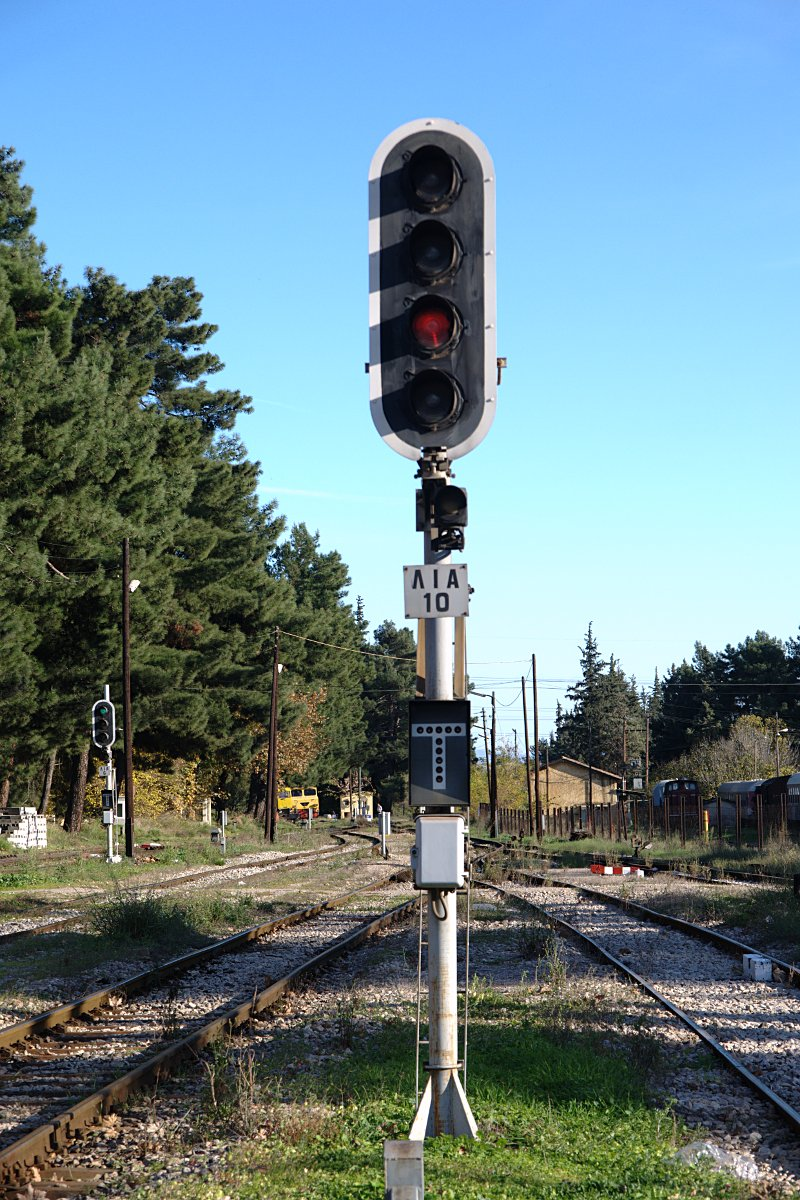
A railway colour light signal at Leianokladi Station.
