= Piraeus–Platy railway =

Railway line in Greece

Piraeus–Platy railway (Part of the Athens–Thessaloniki railway corridor)

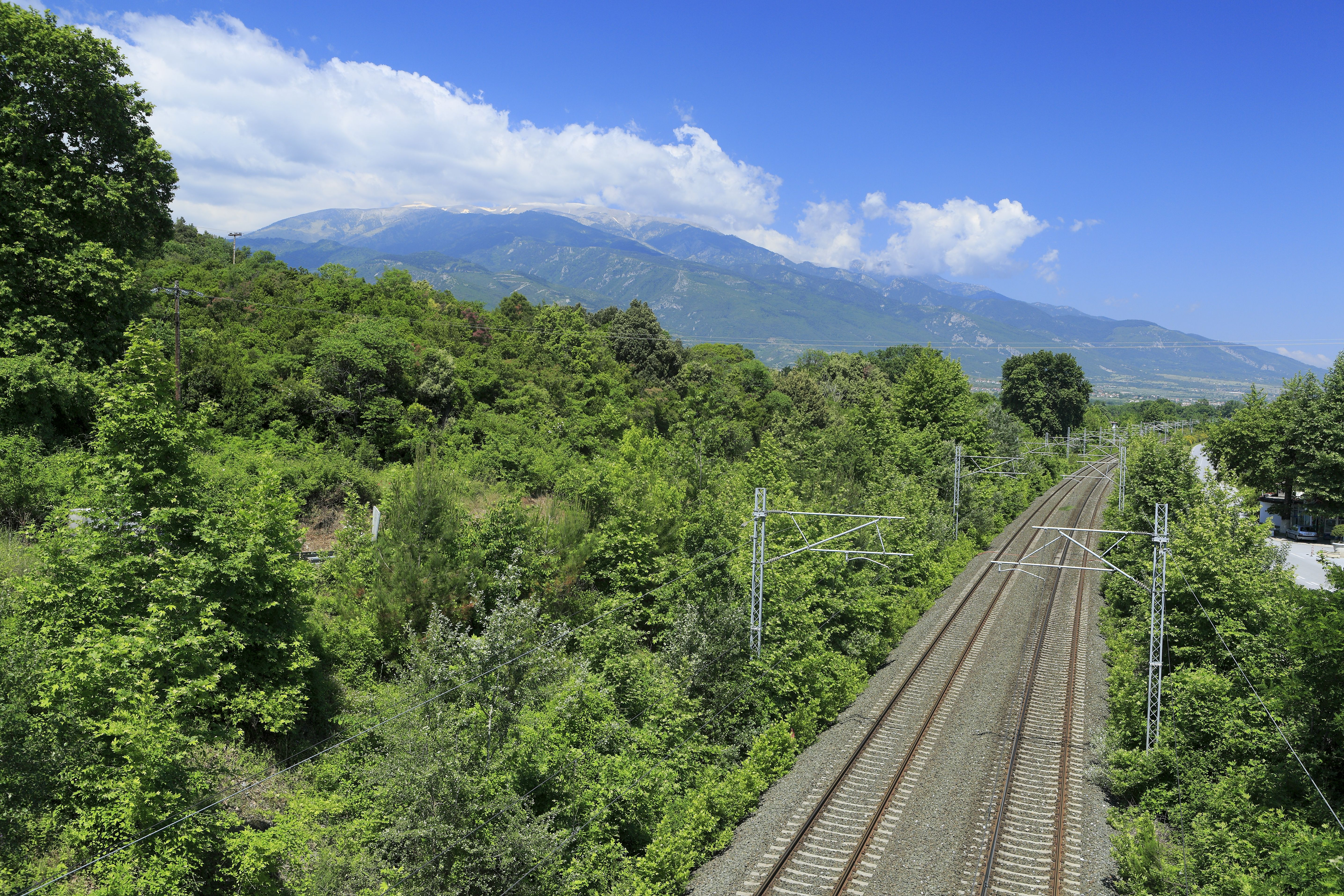
- Section of the line near Mount Olympus in southern Pieria, Macedonia.

Overview
- Status: Operational
- Owner: Hellenic Railways Organisation
- Locale: Greece (Attica, Central Greece, Thessaly, Central Macedonia)
- Termini: Piraeus 37.9491°N 23.6428°E; Platy 40.6372°N 22.5305°E
- Stations: 42

Service
- Type: High-speed rail/Commuter rail
- Services: Intercity; Athens Suburban Railway; Thessaloniki Regional Railway
- Operator: Hellenic Train

History
- Opened: (In stages) from 1908

Technical
- Line length: 456.60 km (283.72 mi)
- Number of tracks: Double track
- Character: Primary
- Track gauge: 1,435 mm (4 ft 8 1/2 in) standard gauge
- Electrification: 25 kV 50 Hz AC
- Operating speed: Average: 160 km/h (100 mph); Maximum: 200 km/h (125 mph)

The railway from Piraeus to Platy is an electrified double-track railway line that connects Athens to northern Greece and the rest of Europe. It constitutes the longest section of the mostly completed higher-speed rail line known as P.A.Th.E./P., which includes Greece's most important rail connection, that between Athens and Thessaloniki. Its northern end is the station of Platy, on the Thessaloniki–Bitola railway. In the south, it connects to the Athens Airport–Patras railway at the Acharnes Railway Center. The line passes through Thebes, Katerini and Larissa, and offers connections to several other cities (Chalcis, Lamia, Volos, Karditsa, Trikala) through branch lines.

== Course ==
The southern terminus of the Piraeus–Platy railway is at the harbour of Piraeus, where connections with ferries to several Greek islands exist. From Piraeus station, the line runs northeast towards the centre of Athens, where it crosses the main Athens railway station, commonly known as Larissa station. Continuing through the northern suburbs of Athens, the line runs to Agioi Anargyroi, where the old Peloponnese line branched off westwards. The metre-gauge track is still in place from this point on.

At Acharnes Railway Center (SKA), the main line connects with the Athens Airport–Patras railway, carrying Athens Suburban Railway services from Piraeus to Athens Airport and to Kiato and Aigio in the Peloponnese. The main line continues northwards and climbs steadily towards Oinoi, through rural and wooded countryside typical of northern Attica. There is a 21.69 km (13.48 mi) branch line from Oinoi to Chalcis.

The works on the new double-track railway from Leianokladi to Domokos was completed in January 2019, while the railway electrification system was completed in April 2019. With the completion of the rebuilt Tithorea–Leianokladi–Domokos section, the Athens–Thessaloniki line is doubled and electrified along its entire length. The old single-track railway was noted for its spectacular mountain scenery between Bralos and Domokos.

There is a 22.61 km (14.05 mi) branch line from Leianokladi passing through Lamia to Stylida. At Palaiofarsalos, an 80.44 km (49.98 mi) line to Karditsa, Trikala and Kalambaka branches off (former Thessaly Railways). There is also a metre-gauge railway to Velestino, which is no longer used commercially. At the Thessalian capital Larissa, there is a 60.76 km (37.75 mi) branch line to Volos. North of Larissa, the line passes through a tunnel at Tempe. The picturesque line adjacent to the coast near Platamon at the northern end of Tempe to Katerini is now abandoned, though still visible. This section of the line provided passengers with unique views towards the mountains and sea as the train travelled along the eastern slopes of Mount Olympus to Katerini.

Platy, Imathia is the point where the nation's two largest cities were first linked by rail in 1916. Trains between the two commenced operations in 1918, with the first through train service from Athens to Paris linking up with the Orient Express, which was inaugurated in 1920. At Platy, the line from Piraeus connects with the line from Thessaloniki to Kozani (including the branch line to Amyntaio) and Florina.

Larissa and Thessaloniki have substantial marshalling yards for both goods and passenger trains. Journey time between Athens and Thessaloniki can vary depending on the type of train selected. Before the Tempi train crash, the regular InterCity service took 4 hours and 13 minutes, while the Express took 3 hours and 59 minutes. Following the implementation of lower operating speeds and other safety measures, the journey times have increased to 7 hours and 17 minutes and 5 hours and 18 minutes respectively. As of October 2024, the journey time between Athens and Thessaloniki is 4 hours and 53 minutes.

== Stations ==
The main stations on the Piraeus–Platy railway are:

- Piraeus station
- Athens railway station
- Acharnes Railway Center
- Palaiofarsalos railway station
- Larissa railway station
- Katerini railway station
- Platy railway station

Some other stations of the line are Oinoi, Thebes, Livadeia, Tithorea, Leianokladi, Angeies and Domokos.

== History ==
Although a railway line from Athens to the north had been planned since 1883, the first section from Athens to Demerli (current Palaiofarsalos railway station) was not opened until 1908. The two branch lines from Oinoi to Chalcis and from Lamia to Stylida were also opened in 1908. Subsequently, the line was extended towards the former Greek–Turkish border at Papapouli, between Larissa and Katerini. Finally, in May 1916, the remaining section from Papapouli to Platy on the line from Thessaloniki to Monastir (Bitola) was opened.

Major upgrades to the line had been planned since the late 1980s. The first upgrade was completed west of Oinoi in the early 1990s. In 1996, the Orfana bypass was opened. On 28 November 2003, the Vale of Tempe line was abandoned in favour of a tunnel, and in 2004 the Tempe–Platamon–Katerini–Platy section was drastically shortened, leading to the abandonment of the picturesque route along the Aegean coast at Platamon. Between 2005 and 2010 several sections were upgraded in order to allow for higher speeds, notably the Oinoi–Tithorea, Domokos–Larissa, Evangelismos–Leptokarya and Aiginio–Thessaloniki sections. The Tithorea–Domokos section was reconstructed on a partly altered route, shortening it from 121.60 km (75.56 mi) to 107.33 km (66.69 mi) in order to sustain high-speed railway requirements. It includes two tunnels—the 9.3 km (5.8 mi) Kallidromo Tunnel, which is the longest in the Balkans, and the 7 km (4.3 mi) Othrys Tunnel. Another upgrade is the reparation of the damaged electrification system of the section between Acharnes and Tithorea.

An accident occurred near Tempi on February 28, 2023. It is Greece's worst railway disaster. The station master in Larissa was arrested in connection to the accident.

== Services ==
The Piraeus–Platy railway is used by the following passenger services:

- Intercity, Express and Regular services Athens–Thessaloniki, Athens–Kalampaka, Athens–Leianokladi and Thessaloniki–Kalampaka
- Proastiakos services Athens–Chalcis and Thessaloniki–Larissa
