= Hellenic Railways Organisation =

Defunct Greek railway infrastructure company

- Native name: Οργανισμός Σιδηροδρόμων Ελλάδος
- Industry: Rail transport, logistics
- Predecessor: Hellenic State Railways (1920–1970); Thessaly Railways (1884–1955)
- Founded: 1 January 1971
- Defunct: 30 August 2025
- Successor: Greek Railways
- Headquarters: Athens, Greece
- Area served: Greece
- Key people: OSE Group President: Giannos Grammatidis; OSE Managing Director: Filippo Tsalidis; ERGOSE Managing Director: Christos Vinis
- Products: Rail transport
- Revenue: ▲138.131m€ (2023)
- Net income: ▼ -253.378m€ (2023)
- Number of employees: 645 (2023)
- Parent: Hellenic Republic Asset Development Fund
- Subsidiaries: GAIAOSE; ERGOSE
- Website: www.ose.gr/en/

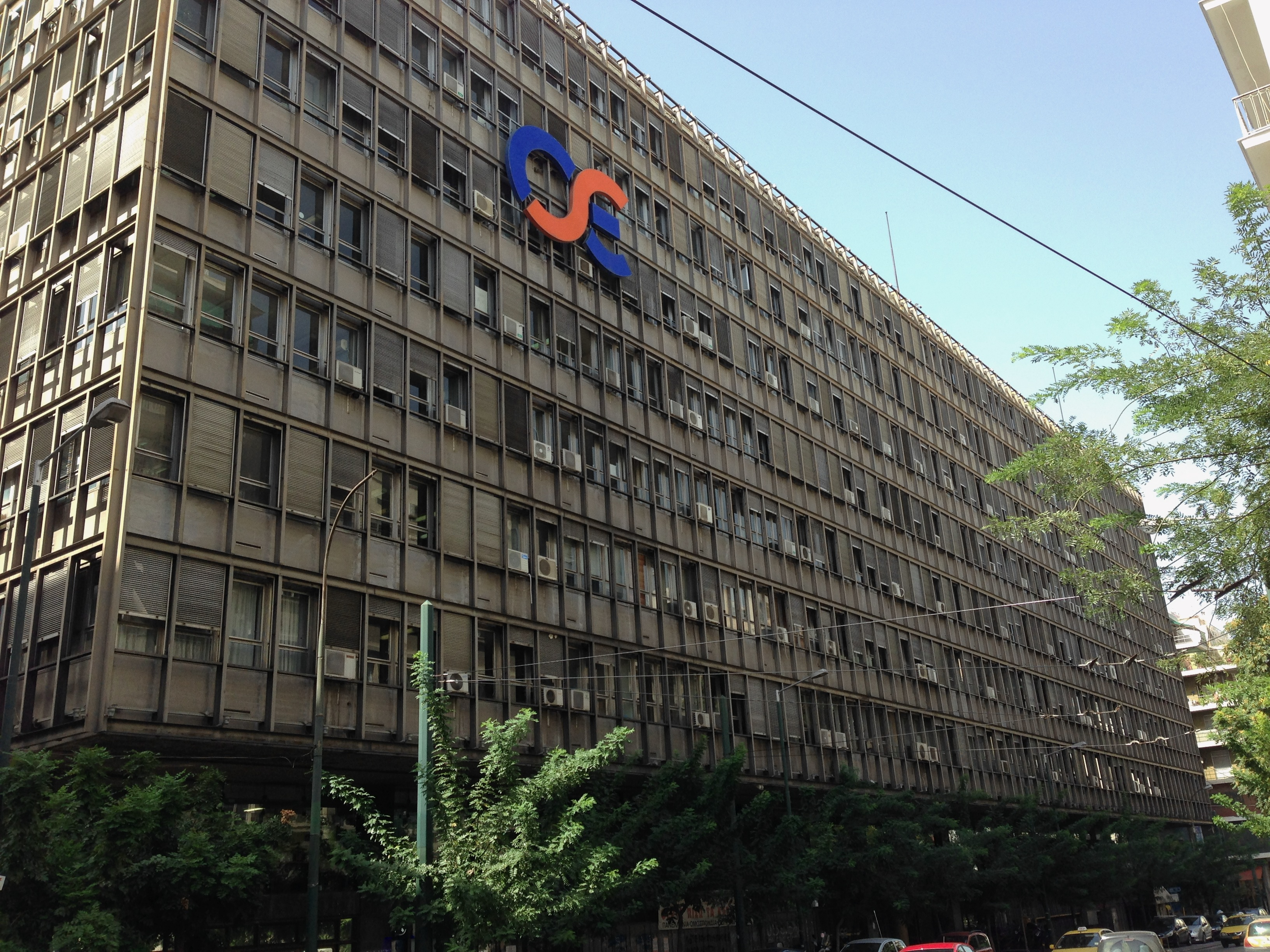
OSE Headquarters 1–3 Karolou St., 104 37, Athens

The Hellenic Railways Organisation or OSE (Greek: Οργανισμός Σιδηροδρόμων Ελλάδος, romanized: Organismos Sidirodromon Ellados or Greek: Ο.Σ.Ε.) was the Greek national railway company which owned, maintained and operated all railway infrastructure in Greece with the exception of Athens' rapid transit lines from 1971 to 2025. Services on these lines are run by Hellenic Train, a former OSE subsidiary, Rail Cargo Logistics Goldair, Pearl and Grup Feroviar Român.

== History ==
Hellenis Railways Organisation was founded on 1 January 1971, with the Legislative Decree 674/1970, taking over the responsibilities as the successor to the Hellenic State Railways which had been founded in 1920. OSE is owned 100% by the Greek State. In 1996 ERGOSE was created within OSE to facilitate infrastructure projects. In 1999 The first section of the electrified line between Thessaloniki and Eidomeni is opened. Power is provided by an Overhead Contract System with 25 kV AC, 50 Hz.

In 2001, the infrastructure element of OSE was created, known as GAIAOSE. It would henceforth be responsible for the maintenance of stations, bridges and other elements of the network, as well as the leasing and sale of railway assists. In 2003, OSE launched "Proastiakos SA", as a subsidiary to serve the operation of the suburban network in the urban complex of Athens during the 2004 Olympic Games. In 2005, TrainOSE was created as a brand within OSE to concentrate on rail services and passenger interface. In 2008, all Proastiakos were transferred from OSE to TrainOSE. In 2013 ΕΕΣΣΤΥ, Stock Maintenance Company became a separate part of OSE responsible for both the maintenance of rolling stock and the leasing of it.

In December 2008 the Hellenic Republic Asset Development Fund became the sole shareholder of the corporation. A tendering process for the privatisation of TrainOSE began in July 2013. After a change in government the process was suspended in 2015, before recommencing in January 2016. Ferrovie dello Stato Italiane submitted the only binding offer, GEK Terna and Russian Railways submitted expression of interests but not formal offers.

On 14 July 2016, the privatisation agency accepted Ferrovie dello Stato Italiane's €45 million offer. The sale was completed on 14 September 2017. In 2019 Ferrovie dello Stato Italiane aquared ΕΕΣΣΤΥ As of December 2020, the Greek railway network consisted of 2,293 kilometres (1,425 mi) of active line length, some sections of which, such as the Peloponnese metric network, are used only in tourist seasons. The approximate length of the active network in permanent operation reaches 1,800 kilometres (1,100 mi)

On 5 September 2023, Storm Daniel triggered largescale flooding in Thessaly. The rail infrastructure was badly affected in the region, cutting off both Regional and Intercity routes as significant parts of the infrastructure were washed away. OSE engineers were on the ground in the worst affected areas Domokos, Doxaras, and Paleofarsalos to assess the extent of the damage, and prepare detailed reports, and seek financial assistance from the European Union. 50 km (31 mi) of tracks was completely destroyed Repairing the extensive damage, was estimated at between 35 and 45 million euros. OSE managing director, Panagiotis Terezakis, spoke of reconstruction works reaching 50 million euros, confirming at the same time that there will be no rail traffic in the effected sections of the network for at least a month. The devastation goes beyond the tracks and signalling, affecting costly equipment such as the European Train Control System (ETCS), which enhances rail safety. In November 2023, rail services resumed between Larissa and Rapsani after the devastating storm With Through services from Athens to Thessaloniki recommencing on 16 December 2023. However services between Larissa and Volos remain suspended across Thessaly's coast until the track is repaired, with a rail-replacement bus in operation.

In December 2024 it was announced that ERGOSE would merge back into OSE bringing together the responsible for managing railway infrastructure projects (particularly those co-funded by European Union) with managing railway assets, maintenance of stations and bridges, as well as the leasing and sale of railway properties into a single operational structure.

In 2025, a deal was reached for Deutsche Bahn to assist in modernizing Greece's railway system. Deutsche Bahn will support the operation and improvement of parts of the Greek rail network, contributing technical expertise, staff training, and operational guidance. The agreement follows Greece's efforts to enhance railway safety and infrastructure after a major train accident in 2023 and is part of an initiative to strengthen public transport systems across member states. The cooperation includes the deployment of German railway specialists and engineers to Greece, where they will assist in improving rail services and operations.

In August 2025, the Greek Ministry of Infrastructure and Transport confirmed the creation of a new body, Greek Railways (Greek: Σιδηρόδρομοι Ελλάδος, romanized: Ellinikí Sidiródromi Monoprósopi) to assume responsibility for rail infrastructure, planning, modernisation projects, and rolling stock across Greece. Previously, these functions were divided among several state-owned entities: OSE, which managed infrastructure; ERGOSÉ, responsible for modernisation projects; and GAIAOSÉ, which owned stations, buildings, and rolling stock. OSE had overseen both infrastructure and operations until its vertical separation in 2005. Rail safety has been identified as a key priority. The merger follows the July approval of a Parliamentary Bill to restructure the national railway system, a direct response to the Tempi accident of February 2023, in which 43 people died after a head-on collision.

== Branding ==
=== Early Years (1960s–1980s) ===
OSE's first logo used from January 1971 to November 2003

Initially, OSE's liveries were functional and utilitarian, with a new Logo to represent the new company. The first logo of the Hellenic Railways Organization, was established 1970, featured a distinct and simple design reflecting the organization's purpose and identity. The original logo depicted a winged wheel, symbolizing speed, mobility, and the connection between technology and transportation, a common motif in railway insignias worldwide. This design was framed in a circular layout, often accompanied by the acronym "OSE" in Greek letters (ΟΣΕ) or full name in some instances. The choice of the winged wheel highlighted the organization's focus on modernizing Greece's railway infrastructure and enhancing its services. Most locomotives and rolling stock were painted in shades of green, reflecting a traditional European railway style. Steam Locomotives, where primarily black with white or silver detailing, consistent with global practices for visibility and maintenance ease.

=== Modernization Era (1980s–1990s) ===
OSE's second logo introduced in November 2003

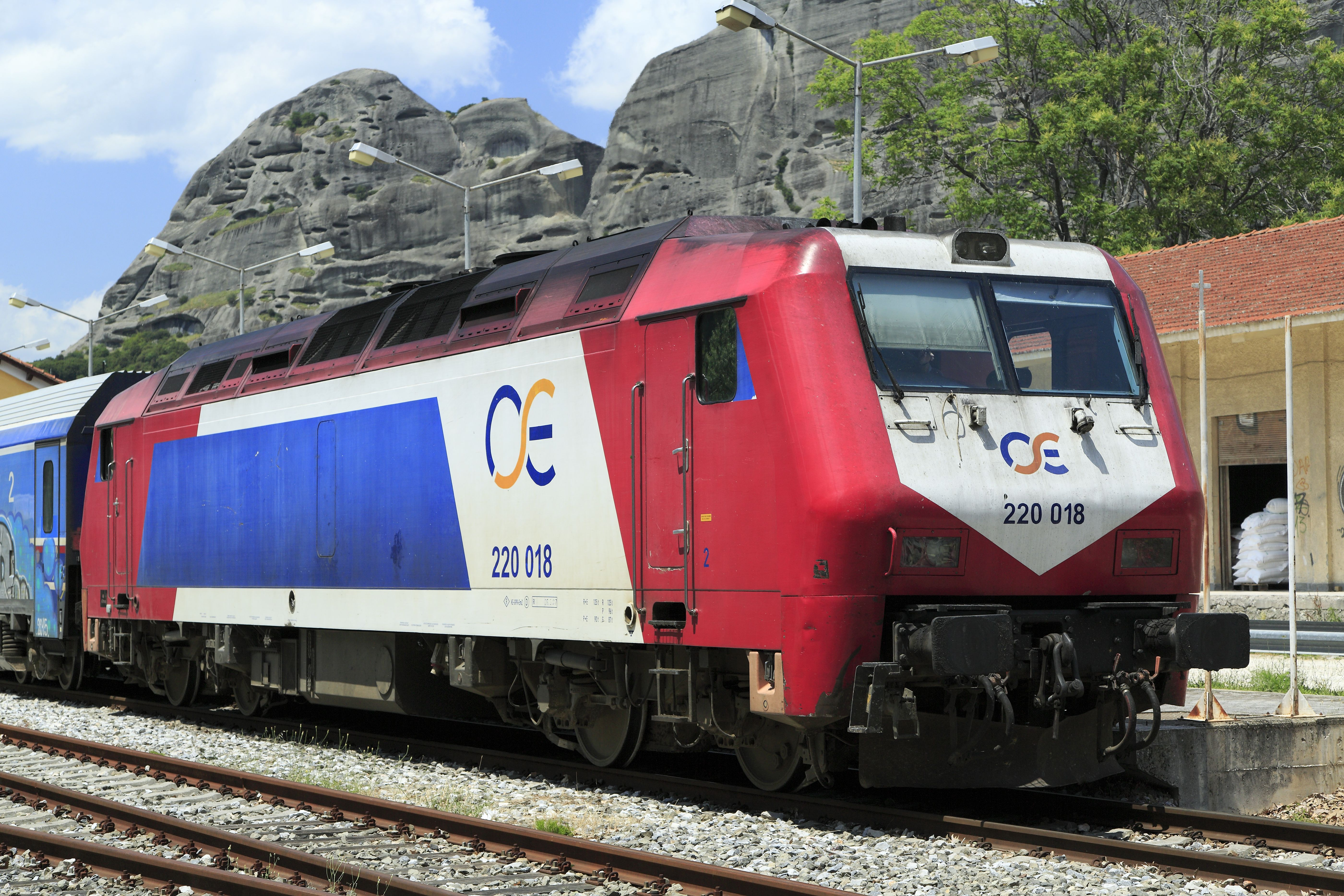
An Express train (Athens–Kalambáka) at Kalambaka station with OSE logo in May 2016

During this period, OSE adopted blue and white liveries, aligning with the national colours of Greece. Passenger carriages often featured a white base with blue stripes. Diesel locomotives such as the Alco models began sporting blue with white or yellow detailing, while some electric units showcased variations of red, yellow, and silver.

=== 2000s – Brand Consolidation ===
New OSE Logo and Branding of corporate logo was prominently displayed on rolling stock. The letters of the new logo incorporate interlocking and flowing curves, symbolizing connection and movement, which align with the concept of a railway network. The colours are a contrast to each other, with both the orange and the blue, making the logo visually dynamic and ensuring it stands out in various contexts. The designs became more streamlined, incorporating lighter blue and grey tones to reflect a modern image. High-speed Intercity (IC) trains were branded with more vibrant and passenger-focused liveries, including combinations of blue, white, and silver.

=== Post-Privatization Influences (2010s–2020s) ===
With the privatization of the passenger operator TRENOSE (now Hellenic Train under the Ferrovie dello Stato Italiane group), livery styles began to diversify. TRENOSE introduced its branding, emphasizing red, white, and silver, particularly on its modernized ETR 470 and other high-speed trains. The Freight locomotives continued with more subdued liveries, often red, blue, or gray. Under the management of Hellenic Train, OSE's infrastructure and rolling stock are gradually being updated. Liveries reflect modern corporate branding, often incorporating sleek designs and reflective of the Italian influence.

== Primary rail network ==
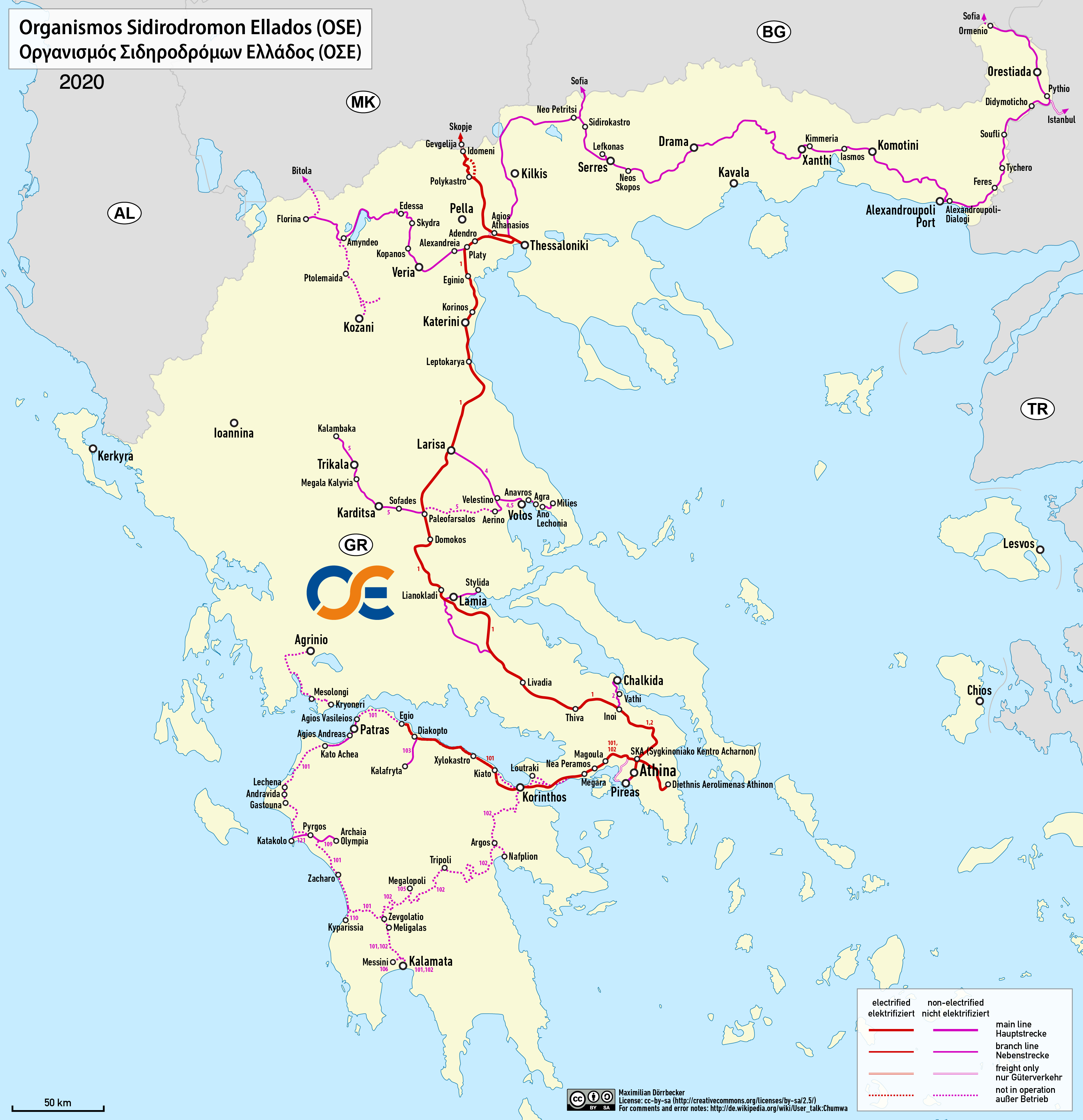
Railway network in Greece: main, secondary, under construction/disused.

As in most European Union countries, the administration of the railway infrastructure is separate from the railway operating companies using the network to provide passenger and freight transportation services. Up until November 2010, company EDISY S.A. was the actual manager of the Greek national railway infrastructure until it became a subsidiary of OSE. Specifically, on 29 November 2010, EDISY S.A. was merged back into the parent company OSE S.A., which is today the manager of the rail infrastructure of Greece.

The major lines of the Greek railway network consist of the mostly electrified standard gauge double-track line from Athens to northern Greece-Thessaloniki, a single-track electrified line from Thessaloniki to Idomeni (at the border with North Macedonia) and the mixed-gauge line from Athens to Peloponnese. Almost all other lines link directly with these two lines. The main line of the Greek Railway System from Athens to Thessaloniki covers a distance of 520 kilometres (320 mi).

According to the 2007 Network Statement, the total length of the standard gauge lines was approximately 1,665 kilometres (1,035 mi), while the length of the metre gauge lines (excluding Krioneri–Missolonghi–Agrinio line) is about 725 km (450 mi). In addition, about 150 km (93 mi) of new standard gauge lines towards Athens Airport and to replace metre gauge lines became fully operational in July 2007.

The backbone of the Greek railway network is called P.A.Th.E./P., which stands for Patras–Athens–Thessaloniki–Idomeni/Promachonas.

=== Piraeus – Athens Central Station ===
Piraeus is served by two terminals. One at Piraeus Harbour (Πειραιεύς Λιμήν, 37°56′55″N 23°38′08″E), which up until 2006 was used by some standard gauge trains for Chalkis, Thessaloniki, and Alexandroupolis. The short line to Agios Ioannis Renti is closed and, as of 2009, is being renovated. The heavy rolling stock repair works (Piraeus Central Factory, Κεντρικό Εργοστάσιο Πειραιώς – ΚΕΠ) are located at Lefka (37°57′17″N 23°39′03″E), next to Ergostasio halt, and are accessible from this line.

The other Piraeus mainline station (Peloponnese Station, 37°56′57″N 23°38′36″E) was used by the Peloponesse metric line trains until 2005, when it was converted to standard gauge, reopening in 2007 and today serving the Proastiakos rail service. The two lines from Piraeus meet just outside Agios Ioannis Renti (AIR) marshalling yard (37°57′41″N 23°39′55″E). Next to the marshalling yard lies the major rolling stock depot and maintenance facility of OSE (MAI).

North of AIR, the line crosses Kifissos River and then passes through the freight and parcels handling station of Rouf. At a siding of Rouf station, there is a "railway theatre" in disused rolling stock and a disused SEK class Μα "2-10-2" steam locomotive made by Breda (37°58′27″N 23°42′14″E). The line between Rouf and Athens Central (Larissis Station) is single-track and non-electrified.

There is considerable traffic on this stretch as it serves the busy Proastiakos commuter rail service and regional rail service to Thessaloniki and Halkida (Chalkis); as well as other destinations served by Athens.

=== Athens – Larissa – Thessaloniki ===
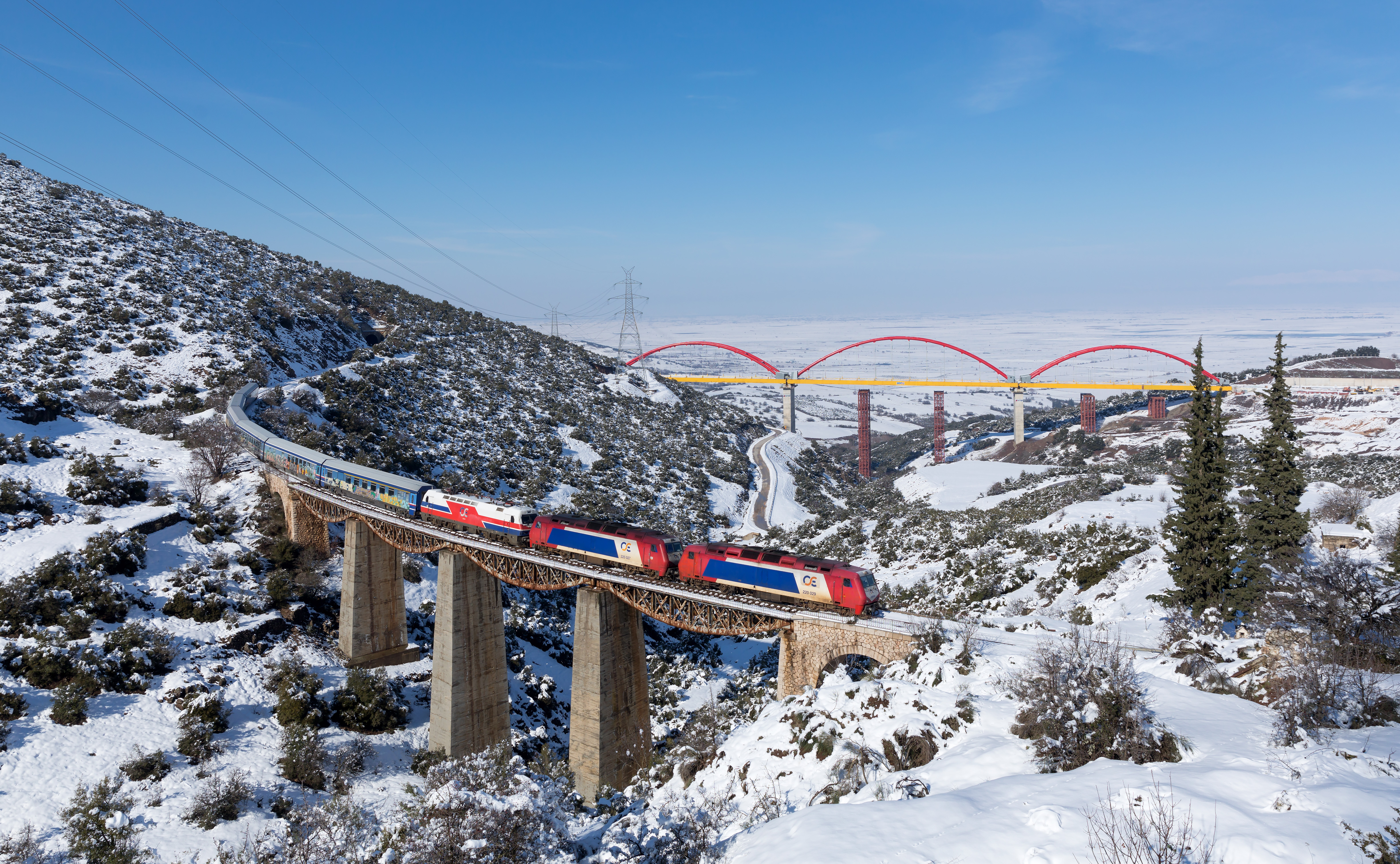
TrainOSE's Adtranz class 220 029 and 220 027 haul an unidentified HellasSprinter with the IC 52 Athens - Thessaloniki over the Kifera viaduct

In 1916 the railway from Athens to Platy was completed, linking Athens with the European railway network. The line passes through Thebes and Larissa, and offers connections to several other cities (Chalcis, Lamia, Volos, Trikala) through branch lines. At Platy the line joins with the line from Thessaloniki to Amyntaio, Kozani, and Florina. The line continues across flatland until the suburbs of Thessaloniki are reached at Sindos.

Larissa and Thessaloniki have substantial marshalling yards for both goods and passenger trains. There are daily InterCity (IC) trains from Athens to Thessaloniki and one night train. The InterCity (IC) rail service usually takes 4 hours and 23 minutes from Athens to Thessaloniki and 4 hours and 10 minutes from Thessaloniki to Athens.

=== Athens – Corinth – Kiato - Patras ===
In 2004, a new line was inaugurated running from Acharnai (SKA) junction to Athens International Airport "El Venizelos". Between Iraklio and Koropi, the new line runs along a closed motorway (Attiki Odos) along the general direction of the old Lavrio line, but displaced east. The line is double-track and electrified with 25 kV overhead catenary. When the planned extension from Koropi to Lavrio is built, it will probably follow the old Lavrio line more closely.

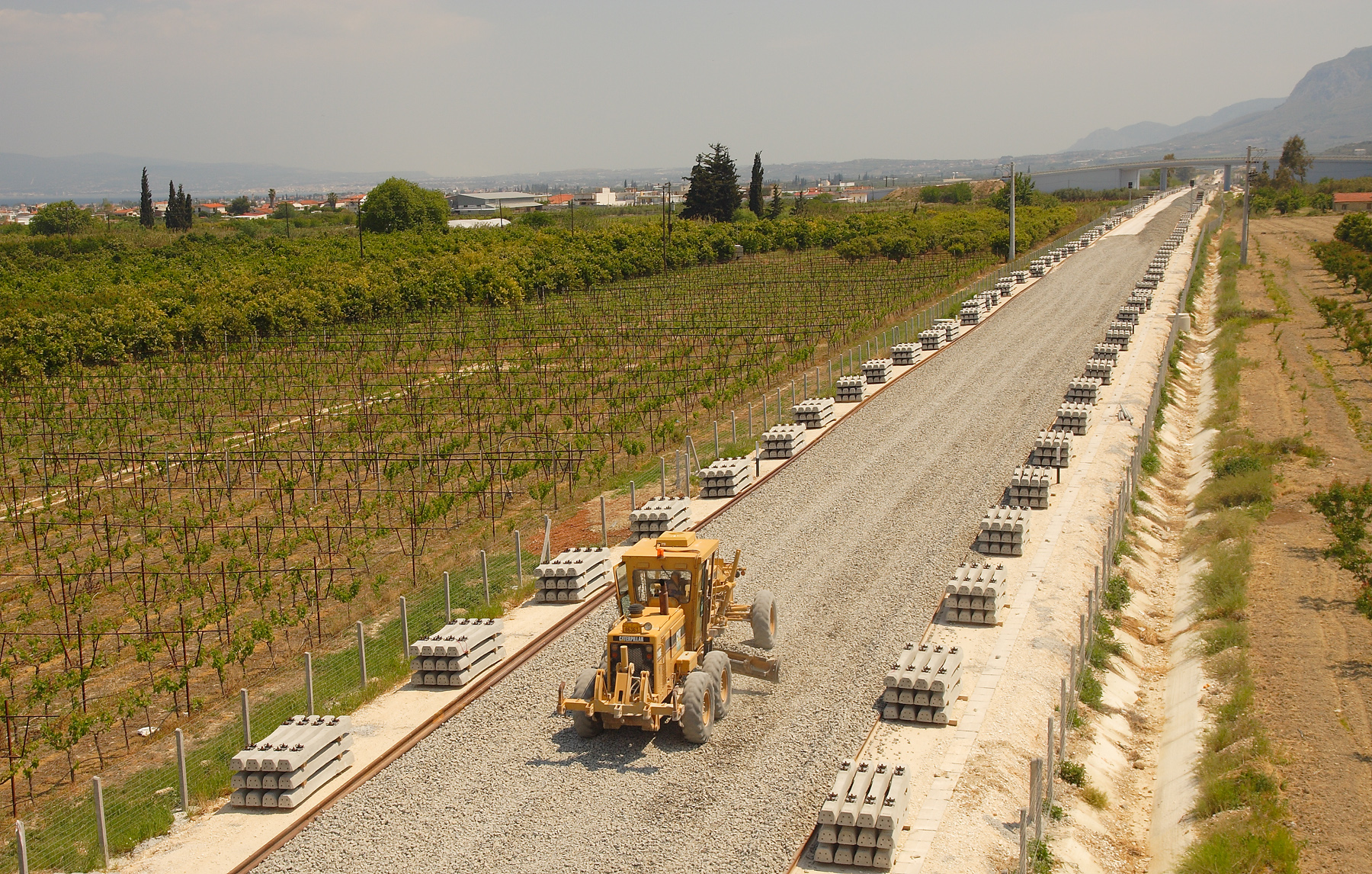
Work in progress between Corinth and Kiato, April 2007. This section is now in use.

The new Corinth line branches off at SKA and runs west into Elefsis and the Megara Plains. The line passes through impressive tunnels and bridges in the "Kakia Skala" area, north of Agioi Theodoroi; while crossing the Corinth Canal over a new bridge and then into the New Corinth Station.

The line extends up to the village of Rodadaphni. Currently, the service is carried by DMU trains between Kiato and Aigio, where passengers can change to Hellenic Train bus services to Patras. Passengers in Kiato can also choose Hellenic Train bus services to reach Patras. There is work in progress to extend the line to Rio (Bozaitika area), while plans exist to extend the line to Patras. Electrification of the lineup to Rio is in the plan as well.

=== Thessaloniki – Idomeni ===
This is a single-track electrified line connecting Thessaloniki with Idomeni, near the border with North Macedonia. It is mostly used for international freight.

== Secondary rail network ==
=== Thessaloniki – Edessa – Amyntaio – Kozani / Florina ===
Vodena (today Edessa) station in 1899

This line was opened in 1894 and connects Thessaloniki with the city Bitola, in the southern part of North Macedonia. It passes through Platy, Veroia, Edessa, Amyntaio, and Florina. At Amyntaio the Kozani–Amyntaio railway branches off. The section between Thessaloniki and Platy is part of the important connection towards Athens and southern Greece. The part across the border with North Macedonia is not used anymore, and passenger traffic has been suspended west of Edessa.

=== Thessaloniki – Alexandroupoli – Svilengrad ===
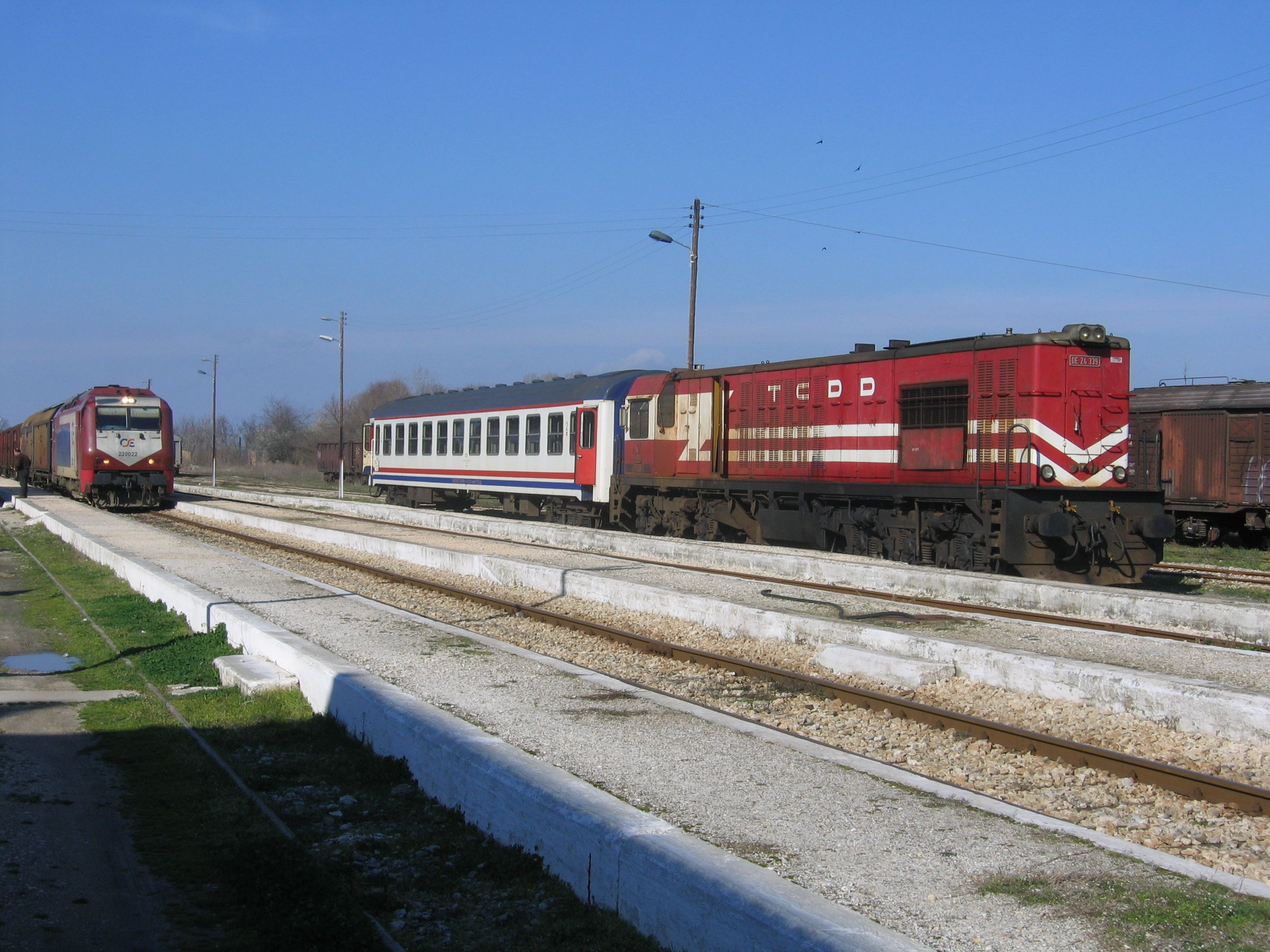
Pythio station, where OSE's network connected to that of Turkish State Railways (TCDD) until February 2011

This railway line, 620 km long, joins Thessaloniki via the Port of Alexandroupoli to Svilengrad in Bulgaria, passing through or near most major cities of East Macedonia and Thrace (Serres, Drama, Xanthi, Komotini). At Strymon, the line connects with a northbound line along Strymon River Valley to Promachonas, which then joins with the Bulgarian network at Kulata. The line section from Stavroupoli to Toxotes runs along Nestos River Valley and is part of a preserved area that is not accessible by road.

From Alexandroupolis, the line continues northwards, where it runs alongside the Evros River, that marks the border between Greece and Turkey. A junction is located at Pythio, where a line continues east and crosses into Turkey towards Istanbul. On the Greek side, the line continues north over the Karaağaç cut off to Ormenio, the northernmost village of Greece. There the line crosses to the Bulgarian border town of Svilengrad. The distance from Alexandroupolis to Ormenio is 178 km.

=== Leianokladi - Stylida ===
An unelectrificated single-track regional railway line that connects Stylida with Lamia and Leianokladi.

=== Oinoi – Chalcis Line ===
The Oinoi–Chalcis railway is an 21.69-kilometre-long (13.48 mi) railway line that connects Oinoi (West Attica) with Chalcis, capital of Euboea in Greece. It is one of the most important railway lines in Central Greece. Its southern terminus is Oinoi, where there are connections to Athens and Thessaloniki.

== Thessaly rail network ==
=== Larissa – Volos ===
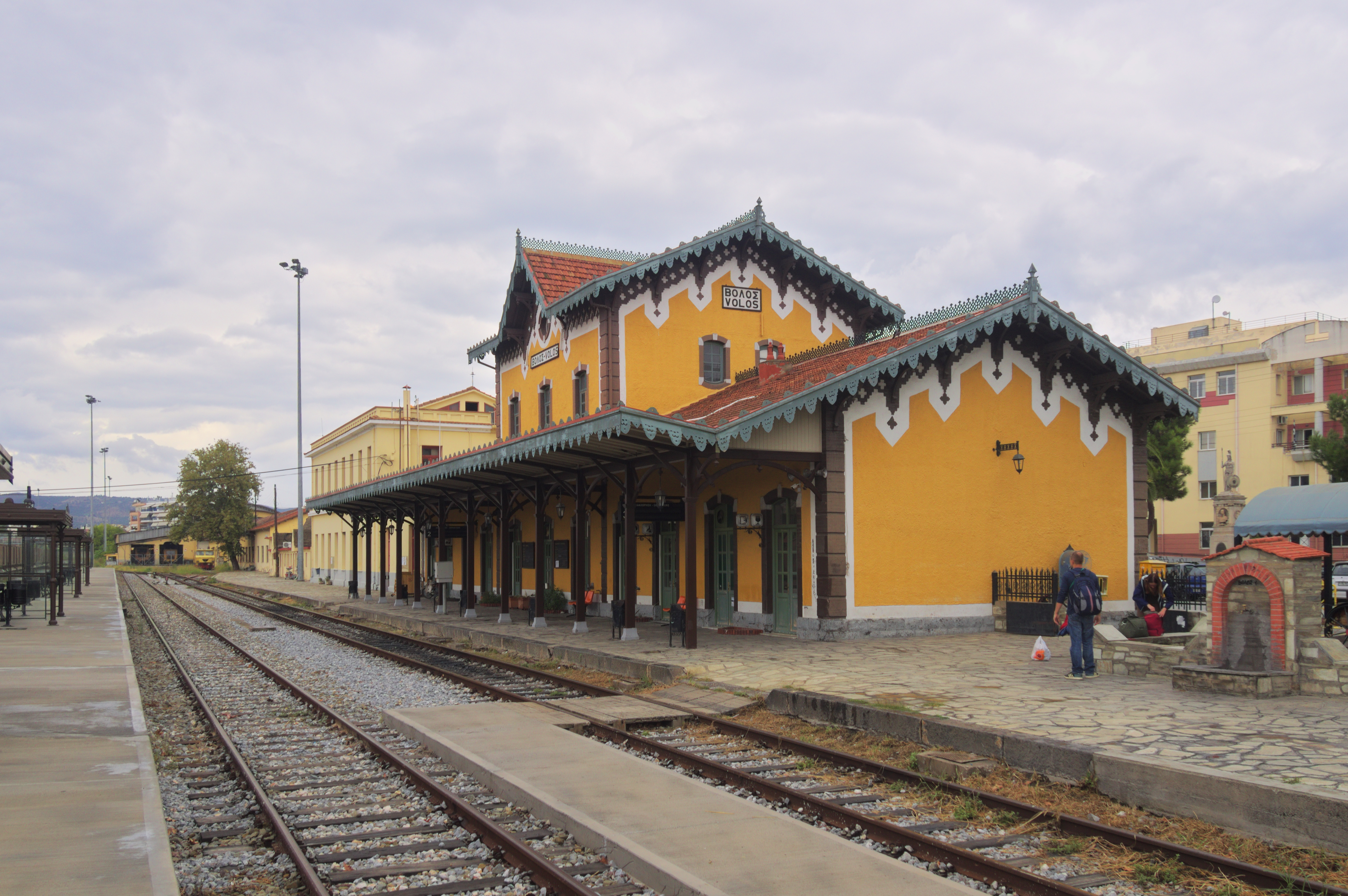
Volos station (1892) designed by Evaristo De Chirico

The 1,435 mm (4 ft 8 1/2 in) standard gauge, single-track branch line from Larissa to the port of Volos (61 km) was completed in 1960 along the route of a former 1,000 mm (3 ft 3 3/8 in) metre gauge line. It branches off the Athens–Thessaloniki mainline at Larissa crossing the Northern part of the Thessalian Plain to Velestino, formerly a junction with the now disused Volos–Palaiofarsalos section. From Velestino it descends rapidly to the port of Volos, initially running parallel to the abandoned metre gauge line and then diverging through Melissiatika. Volos was the terminus for both lines, and also for the Pelion railway to Milies. Engine sheds and marshalling yards at Volos are home to many abandoned relics of the Greek railway system. There is a regular service on this line. Volos station is one of the very rare stations that serves three different gauges of railway line, notably standard gauge, metre gauge, and 600 mm (1 ft 11 5/8 in) gauge.

=== Palaiofarsalos – Kalabaka ===
The West Thessaly single-track line to Kalabaka, recently converted to 1,435 mm (4 ft 8 1/2 in) standard gauge, branches off the Athens–Thessaloniki mainline at Palaiopharsalos. The line serves the cities of Karditsa and Trikala, the towns of Sofades and Kalambaka; and the tourist attraction of Meteora. In the past, this line was part of a 1,000 mm (3 ft 3 3/8 in) metre gauge line from Velestino to Kalabaka, crossing the main line at Palaiofarsalos. The eastern section to Velestino, still metre gauge, is maintained by enthusiasts as a heritage railway.

== Peloponnese metre gauge network ==
The Peloponnese network belonged since its construction to the former Piraeus, Athens and Peloponnese Railways or SPAP (Greek: Σιδηρόδρομοι Πειραιώς Αθηνών Πελοποννήσου, Sidiródromi Pireós Athinón Peloponnísou; ΣΠΑΠ) until 1962 when they were merged to Hellenic State Railways or SEK (Greek: Σιδηρόδρομοι Ελληνικού Κράτους, Sidiródromi Ellinikoú Krátous; ΣΕΚ).

All passenger service on the metre gauge network in the Peloponnese (except the Diakofto Kalavrita Railway) was suspended in 2011. Some special passenger trains were able to run by demand of tour operators with the last one in 2016 but the line as of 2025 needs repairs in order for trains to run again

=== Athens – Corinth – Kiato (metre gauge) ===
Corinth's first railway station, ca 1910

The old metre gauge Piraeus–Patras railway line of Piraeus, Athens and Peloponnese Railways, which ran from Piraeus, Athens to Corinth, used to remain in operation only between Agioi Anargyroi and Corinth for departmental and freight services after passenger services were shut down in 2007 but now is completely abandoned. The track from Piraeus to Agioi Anargyroi has been removed. It is double-tracked between Agioi Anargyroi and Elefsis (near Athens), while for the rest of its remaining section it is single-tracked and non-electrified.

After Ano Liosia, the line runs north and west of the Aegaleo mountain range into Eleusis and onwards to the Megara plain. After nine km it reaches Kakia Skala, running between the old and new highways. It then continues between the mountain and the sea, passing next to the Corinth Refinery, crossing the Corinth Canal into the Peloponnese and on into the Old Station in Corinth on the Southern banks of the Gulf of Corinth. The part between Ano Liosia and Megara is currently under reconstruction in standard gauge and electrified using 25 kV 50 Hz AC.

A short branch line at Isthmos leads to the town of Loutraki. The branch is currently under reconstruction in standard gauge and electrified using 25 kV 50 Hz AC.

=== Kiato – Patras ===
The 1,000 mm (3 ft 3 3/8 in) metre gauge line to Patras runs along the south side of the Gulf of Corinth, the northern coast of the Peloponnese.

At Diakofto, a seaside resort between Corinth and Patras, there is a junction with the Diakofto Kalavrita Railway, a 750 mm (2 ft 5 1/2 in) gauge rack and pinion line which climbs to a height of 720 m during a 22 km journey to Kalavryta through the Vouraikos Gorge. This line is known to Greeks as the "Odontotos" ("The train with teeth").

The main line continues alongside the gulf, passing to the north of Aigio and on to Patras. The Patras train station is situated next to the port near Othonos-Amalias Avenue. An old steam locomotive, c. 1900, lies to the east. The engine sheds and rolling stock depot are located to the northeast next to Norman Street. A freight marshalling yard is near Agios Andreas, although there are no longer freight services on the metric line.

Services on this section were suspended on 17 August 2009 due to work in progress for the line regauging to standard gauge. Hellenic Train announced that services will be reinstated on the western part of the line (Diakopto-Patras) on 27 September 2009. As of 2025 Kiato railway station is the terminal for the electrified trains Siemens-Desiro class 460 as the line till Aigio railway station is not electrified yet but will soon be in 2026

=== Patras – Lechaina – Pyrgos – Olympia ===
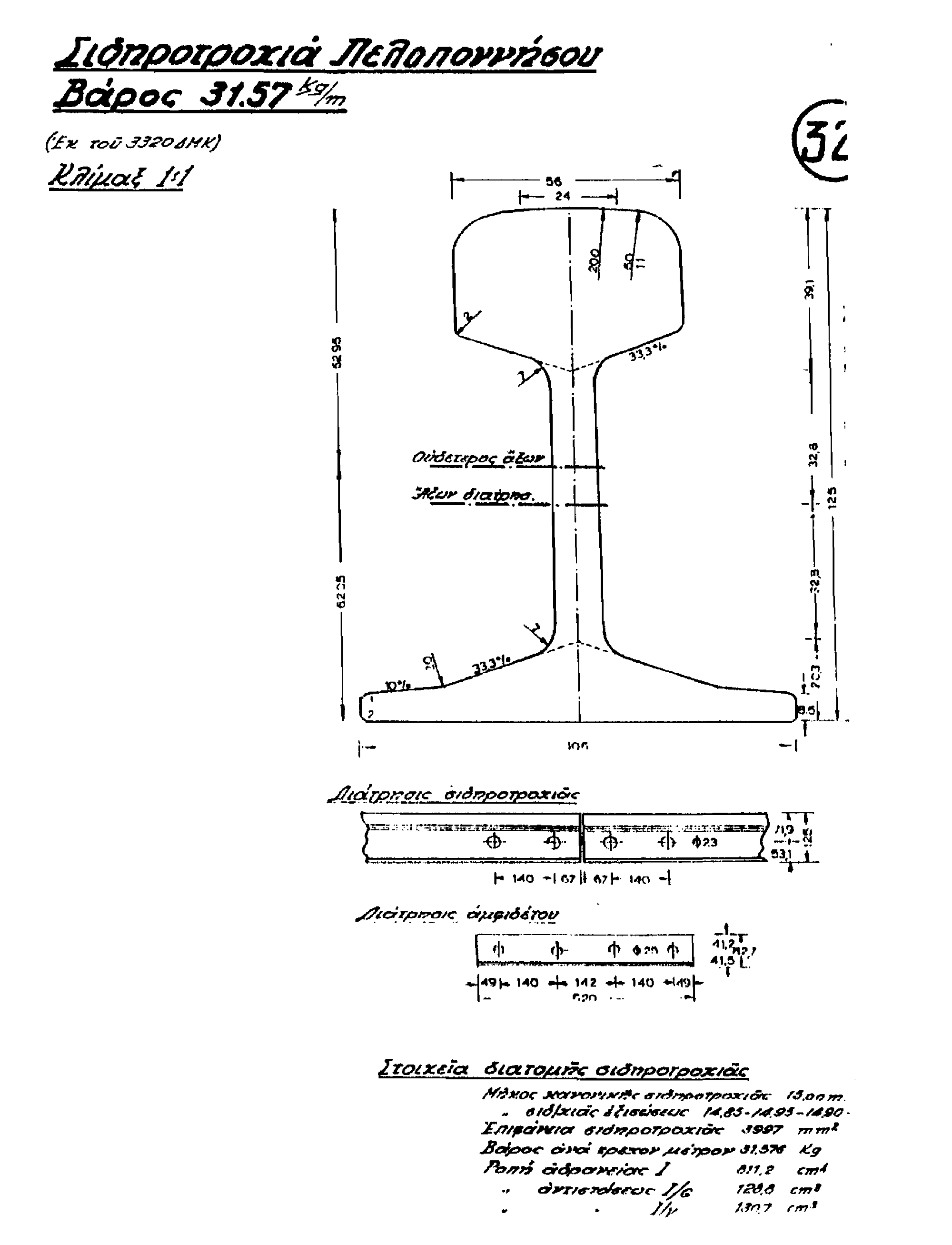
Rail section currently specified for Greek metre gauge lines, mass 31.57 kg/m

The line Patras–Kato Achaia–Lechaina–Amaliada–Pyrgos–Olympia is about 150 km long and runs through the prefectures of Achaia and Ilia. The train runs to the east of Akti Dymaion and alongside the Gulf of Patras between the old and the new highways as far as Kato Achaia, where it passes along the bed of the ravine, 4 km from the EO9/E55 to Lappa. The route then runs to the north of forested land, passing into Nea Manolada, then west of the highway to Lechaina. There used to be a junction with the Kavasila–Kyllini/Loutra Kyllinis branch line here, but this branch has since been abandoned. The line continues southwest to Kardamas and then into Douneika, moving away from the hills before reaching Pyrgos. It passes Pyrgos to the north, shortly branching left to the south west, leaving the main line for Kyparissia and Kalamata. The track runs into the hills, passing through Varvasena and then into the terminus at Olympia.

=== Pyrgos – Katakolo ===
Another 13 km branch line, originally operated by a separate company Σιδηρόδρομος Πύργου–Κατακώλου (Pyrgos–Katakolo Railway), opened in 1883 to link Pyrgos with the port of Katakolo. This line had its own terminal in Pyrgos. Later, in 1951, this railway was taken over by SPAP and trains were diverted into the SPAP station. The line was modernised in 2007 and is used for limited passenger service.

=== Pyrgos – Kalo Nero – Kyparissia/Zevgolatio ===
The line runs along the bed of the Alpheus river, east of the EO9/E55, then through Zacharo and into the plain westward with a few forested hills northwest of Kaiafa. It runs for most of its length west of the highway, passing into Zacharo and through Neochori and Tholon. At Kalo Nero, the main line turns east and runs inland, joining Corinth–Argos–Tripoli–Kalamata line at Zevgolatio while a short branch continues south from Kalo Nero down the coast to Kyparissia.

=== Corinth – Argos – Nafplion – Tripoli – Kalamata ===
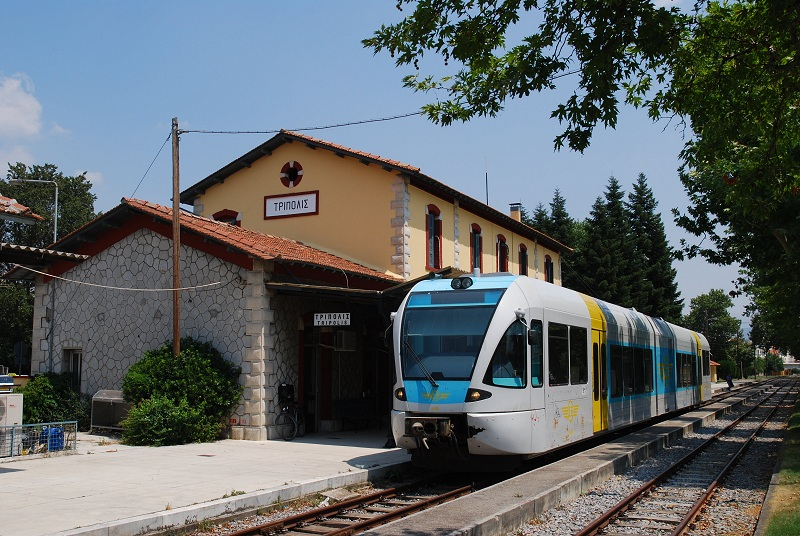
Train 422 from Corinth to Tripolis at Tripolis station. The Stadler GTW-2/6 trainsets represent the latest rolling stock on the Peloponnese narrow gauge network.

The line branches off from the Athens–Corinth–Patras line, one km west of Corinth Old Station, with a spur entering the Corinth New Station. The line passes through Argos, where there is a branch line of ten km from Argos to Nafplion. It continues on to Tripoli and Lefktro, where a short branch line connects Megalopoli to the main line. In Zevgolatio, the line joins the line from Pyrgos–Kyparissia and continues on to Kalamata. This line used to continue from the main station of Kalamata to the old station of "Kalamata Limin" (Kalamata Harbour), now used as an open-air railway museum, and it came to an end at the Port of Kalamata. The track of this last section from Kalamata main station to the port still exists but is no longer in use.

Work is in progress on this line, especially between Tripolis and Kalamata, and details are liable to change. Passenger services on the section between Corinth, Argos, Tripolis, and Nafplion resumed on 1 August 2009 only to stop again 2 years later in 2011 with the whole line

=== Messene – Kalamata ===
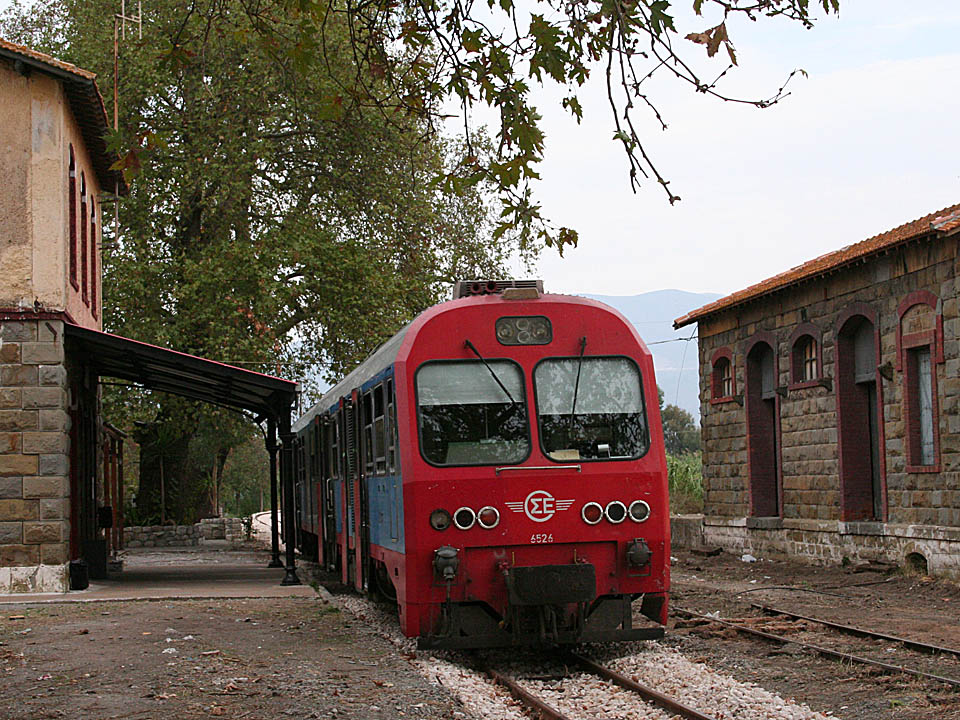
A local train at Messene station in the beginning of October 2007, after the Kalamata – Messene service was reopened 21 September 2007.

This single-track line is a branch of the Corinth–Argos–Tripoli–Kalamata line and is 4.7 km long. The branch starts at Asprochoma then the track follows the EO82 road closely on the southern side. The line was opened in 1892 and linked Kalamata with Messene where a station building and a freight yard were built. It was closed in 1976, but the tracks were not removed.

The line was rebuilt and reopened in September 2007. From 2013 to 2016, there was an occasional operation, from 20 until 28 September, during the Messene festival and to the Christmas period until 10 January.

Since 10 June 2025, there has been an effort in the Kalamata municipal council to restore the Kalamata - Messinia part of the line. The Municipal government wishes for the line to connect the port of Kalamata, Kalamata International Airport, the Courts and finally Messini. The vice-mayor supported the plan and wished to install traffic lights should construction be implemented finishing to say that by the end of 2025 3km of the line will have been completed. The local KKE-backed Councillor claimed that the shutting down of the train tracks is one of the most destructive decisions made.

== Other lines ==
=== Diakofto – Kalavryta Railway ===
The Diakofto–Kalavryta rail line is a historic 750 mm (2 ft 5 1/2 in) gauge rack railway in Greece. Located on the northern Peloponnese, it runs 22 km from Diakofto through the Vouraikos Gorge and the Mega Spilaion monastery and up to Kalavryta, stopping en route at Zachlorou. The line was built by the Piraeus, Athens and Peloponnese Railways (SPAP). Currently the infrastructure and rolling stock are owned and maintained by the Hellenic Railways Organisation (OSE).

The line climbs from sea level to 720 m in 22.3 km with a maximum gradient of 17.5%. There are three sections with Abt system rack for a total of 3.8 km. Maximum speed is 40 km/h for adhesion sections and 12 km/h for rack sections.

=== Pelion Railway Line ===
The 600 mm (1 ft 11 5/8 in) gauge 27 km line from Volos to Milies, a distance of 28 km, was constructed between 1903 and 1906 by the Italian engineer Evaristo De Chirico. The railway was first opened in 1906. It is an independent line, not a continuation of the one metre gauge Volos to Kalambaka line. Although abandoned in the 1970s, it has been restored from Ano Lechonia to Milies. A twice weekly "tourist train" operates during the summer on Saturdays and Sundays. This is occasionally headed by one of the two restored 2-6-0 steam locomotives. The train climbs to a height of 450 metres during its 22 km journey from Ano Lechonia, a journey which takes one and a half hours. The old station at Milies has been converted into a restaurant with guest rooms. When all three gauge railways were operating from Volos, this gave the station the unique distinction of being terminus to three different gauges of railway. The Pelion railway played a major role in the economic development of the Pelion region. The stations that serve this line are rarely operational, but they still exist.

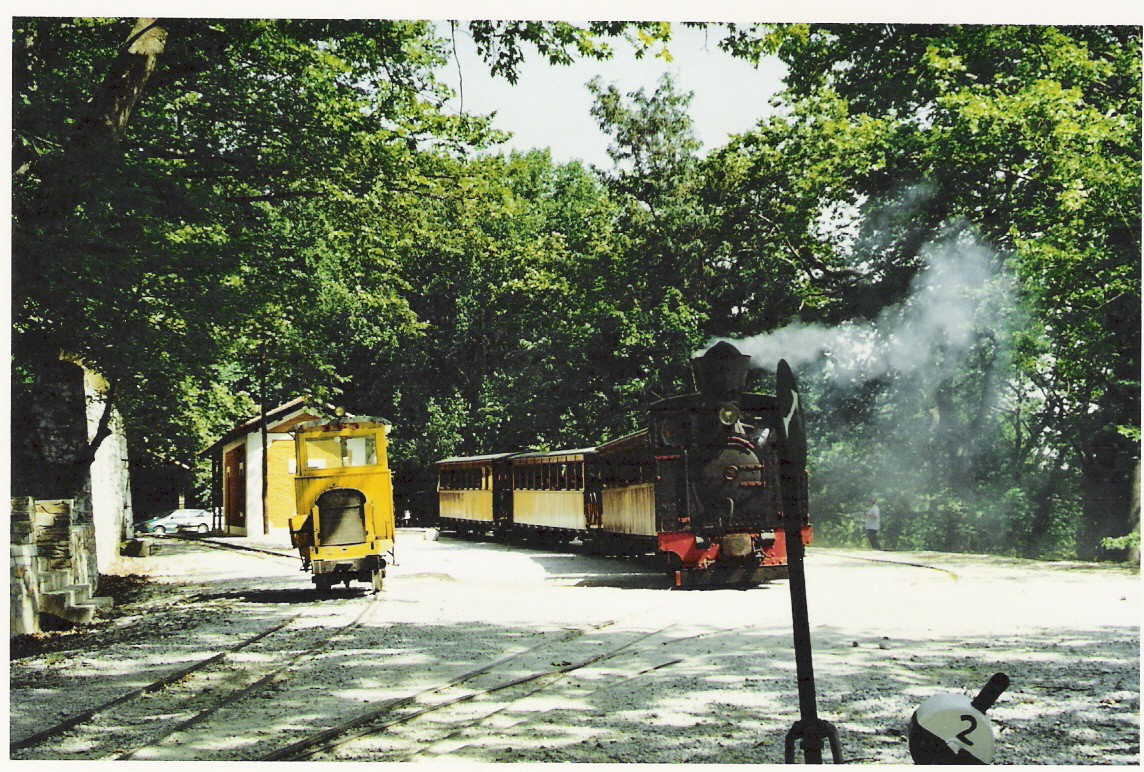
2-4-0 Tubize steam engine (1903) "VOLOS" leaving Milies Station, Pelion

== Abandoned lines ==
=== Paleofarsalos – Velestino – Volos ===
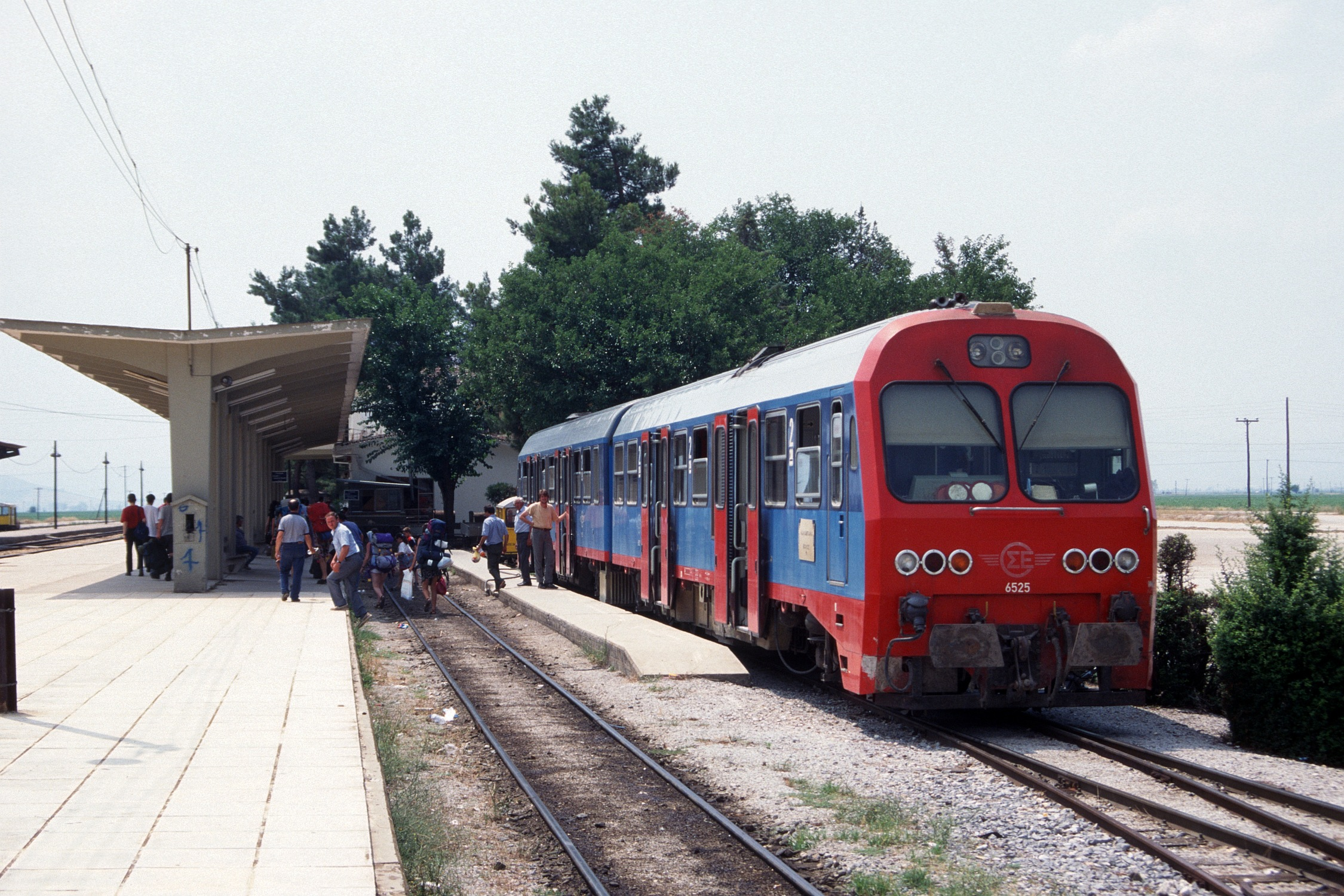
A metric gauge MAN DMU2 at Palaiofarsalos station in 1995

This was formerly a 1,000 mm (3 ft 3 3/8 in) metre gauge line throughout its length from Volos to Kalampaka. However, the track from Paleofarsalos to Kalampaka/Meteora is now 1,435 mm (4 ft 8 1/2 in) standard gauge. The remainder of the metre gauge line from Paleofarsalos to Velestino is no longer in use, though in part it is maintained as a heritage railway by the non-profit Company for Museum Railways (Εταιρεία Μουσειακών Σιδηροδρόμων) or EMOS (ΕΜΟΣ). EMOS now operates a Linke-Hoffman DMU on loan from OSE, an old Nippon Saryo diesel locomotive, formerly of Aliveri Lignite Mines and various rail cars. They also own and plan to return to operational condition a Jung steam locomotive, while other rolling stock shall remain as display items (a Tubize steam locomotive, a Breda railbus etc.).

=== Kavasila – Vartholomio – Kyllini ===
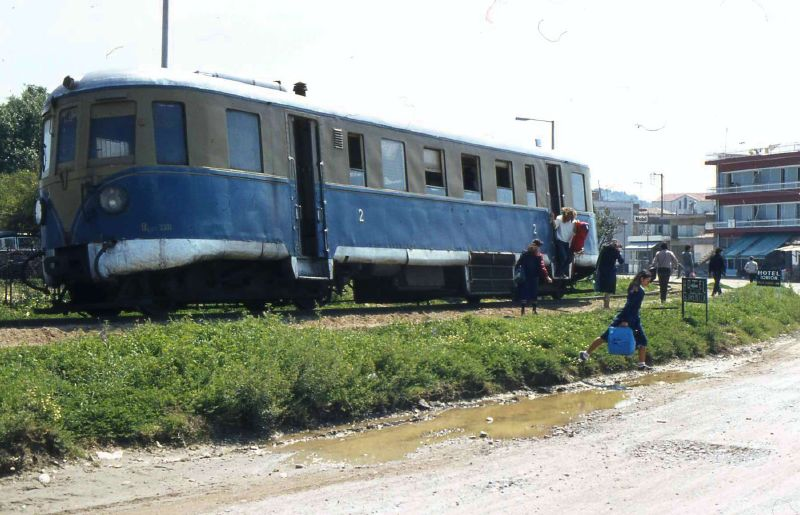
Railbus in Kyllini in 1981

This 16-kilometre-long (9.9 mi) branch line, part of the SPAP network, served the port of Kyllini, from which ferries sail to Zakynthos Island. Services on this branch started in August 1891 and lasted until 1988, with full services and with limited services until 1996, when the line was closed down.

This line also included the 10.8 km branch Vartholomio–Loutra Kyllinis railway line, which opened in June 1892 and closed down in 1969.

=== Kryoneri – Missolonghi – Agrinio ===
This metre gauge line that was opened in the 1890s linked the small port of Kryoneri with Missolonghi and Agrinio. A short branch from Aitoliko to Katochi was in operation from 1912 to 1940. From Kryoneri to Patras, a ferryboat service was provided. The expense of the ferry, the increase in private car traffic, and the hostility of local authorities led to the closure of the line for passenger traffic in 1970 and for departmental traffic in 1975.

In the 1990s, a plan to restore and reopen the line was started. The track was modernised and work finished in 2003, but passenger services have not been restored, due to lack of personnel and rolling stock.

=== Other ===
A number of lines were closed before 1971 and subsequently the track was lifted. They include Sarakli-Savros, Angista-Amphipolis, Alexandroupolis bypass, Skydra-Almopia and Herakleion Kule-Xeropotamos.

== Planned lines ==
- Thessaloniki-Kavala-Toxotes: On 8 March 2016 an intergovernmental agreement between Greece and Turkey for reconnecting the Istanbul to Thessaloniki line was signed. An extension to Igoumenitsa, with the goal to create the Eastern Egnatia Railway, is planned. In November 2022, ERGOSE president, Christos Vinis was reported as giving the go-ahead to the project, after a successful tendering process. Reported as one of the largest railway projects of all time in Greece, the project will see the construction of the new high-speed line from Thessaloniki through Kavala and Xanthi with a total length of 205 kilometres (127 mi), part of the so-called Eastern Railway Egnatia. The new line will be electrified, with new signalling, ETCS and new stations, and is expected to reduce journey times to under 3 hours on the Thessaloniki-Alexandroupoli route. The layout of the line is south-plain and follows that of Egnatia Street in several sections. The speeds will be 160–200 km/h in places. The final cost is expected to exceed €1.68 billion (€2.09 billion with VAT), but is hoped to recoup these costs with better connectivity to Northern Greece and other EU members.
- Thessaloniki - Kozani - Igoumenitsa (Western Egnatia Railway), the project includes also the links between:
  - Igoumenitsa - Ioannina - Kalampaka
  - Kalampaka - Kastoria
  - Kalampaka - Kozani
  - Florina - Pogradec
- Ioannina - Rio
- Thessaloniki - Chalkidiki
- Thessaloniki - Giannitsa-Skydra
- Koropi - Lavrio
- Sindos - Aiginio
- A line between Alexandroupolis and Varna, known as Bosphorous Bypass, shall connect the two towns in the future.
- Chania - Rethymnon - Herakleion Crete

== Headquarters ==
The headquarters of OSE are at 1–3 Karolou St., 104 37, Athens, Greece.

== Accidents ==
Most accidents are due to level crossings, people walking near the tracks, bad communication and safety systems and uneducated workers. Minor accidents include trees blocking the tracks and wild animal collisions.

Area	Date	Killed	Injured	Description
Derveni Korinthias	30/9/1968	34	125	Collision of 2 motorcoaches.
Kryoneri Attiki	23/12/1971	5	?	Collision of a motorcoach and a commercial train 5 killed including the motorcoach head and the train driver.
Doxaras Larissa	16/1/1972	21	40	Head on collision between two motorcoach trains.
Platania Drama	25/7/1982	4	57	Motorcoach derailment and overturned.
Tithorea Ftiotida	11/9/1994	5	?	Derailment of an intercity train due to excessive speed when entering a station.
Chryso	17/2/2006	2	18	Collided with a pickup truck that stopped on the tracks. The driver and passenger of the truck were killed.
Larissa	8/3/2008	0	28	Intercity train derailed before reaching the station.
Achladokampos	9/12/2010	1	?	Motorcoach Derailment
Adendro	13/5/2017	3	?	Derailment. A passenger, the driver and the traffic supervisor were killed.
Lamia	3/8/2018	0	2	Train derailment inside the station.
Kalochori Serres	15/12/2018	1	0	A senior farmer with his tractor collided with a passenger train, resulted in a fatal injury for him.
Xanthi	20/7/2019	1	0	A train run over a person on the track.
Diavata	19/8/2019	1	1	A collision between a train and a car at a guarded crossing.
Tempi	28/02/2023	57	85	Head on collision between a passenger and freight train.

== See also ==
- Budapest–Belgrade–Skopje–Athens railway
- Diakofto Kalavrita Railway
- Egnatia Railway
- Greek railway signalling
- Hellenic Railways Organisation rolling stock
- Kozani-Amyntaio railway line
- Proastiakos
- Railways of Greece
- Hellenic Train
