= Magoula railway station =

Μαγούλα Magoula
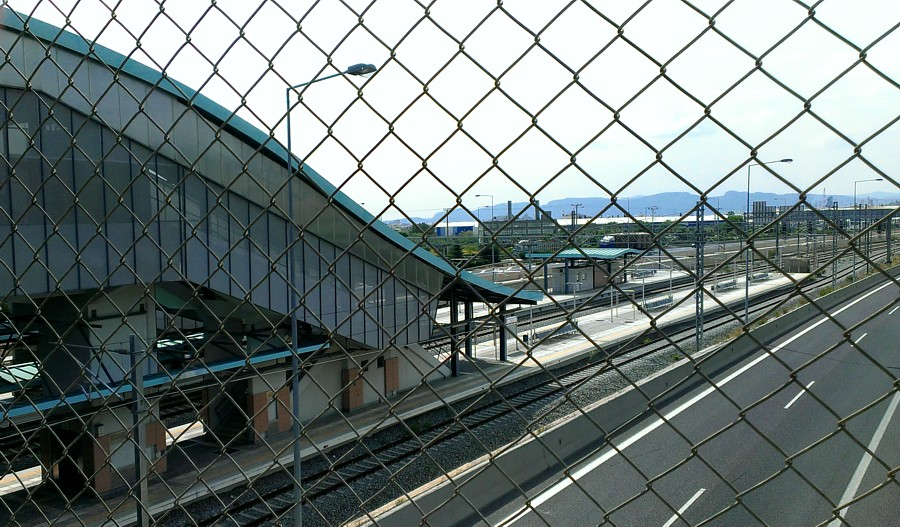
- The station, 8 April 2014

General information
- Location: Magoula 196 00, Elefsina; West Attica; Greece
- Coordinates: 38°04′25″N 23°31′46″E
- Owner: GAIAOSE
- Operator: Hellenic Train
- Line: Airport–Patras railway
- Platforms: 4

Construction
- Structure type: at-grade
- Platform levels: 2
- Parking: Yes (limited)
- Cycle facilities: No
- Accessible: Yes

Other information
- Status: Staffed
- Website: http://www.ose.gr/en/

Key dates
- 27 September 2005: Line opened
- 18 July 2006: Station opened
- 12 December 2010: Line electrified

Services
Preceding station	Suburban Rail	Following station
Nea Peramos towards Kiato	Line A4	Aspropyrgos towards Piraeus
Location

Magoula railway station (Greek: Σιδηροδρομικός σταθμός Μαγούλας, romanized: Sidirodromikós Stathmós Magoúlas) is a station in the municipal unit of Magoula of the municipality of Elefsina, West Attica, Greece. It is located adjacent to A8 motorway between Athens and Patras. It was opened on 18 July 2006 as part of the extension of the Athens Airport–Patras railway to Corinth It has two side platforms and a siding. The station is served by the Athens Suburban Railway between Piraeus and Kiato. The station has a similar design to Ano Liosia railway station. The station serves the adjacent Thriasio hospital.

== History ==
The station was opened on 18 July 2006 as part of the extension of the Athens Airport–Patras railway to Corinth, as part of Line 2 of the Athens Suburban Railway began serving the station. In 2008, all Athens Suburban Railway services were transferred from OSE to TrainOSE. In 2009, with the Greek debt crisis unfolding OSE's Management was forced to reduce services across the network. Timetables were cutback and routes closed, as the government-run entity attempted to reduce overheads. In 2017 OSE's passenger transport sector was privatised as TrainOSE, currently a wholly owned subsidiary of Ferrovie dello Stato Italiane infrastructure, including stations, remained under the control of OSE. In July 2022, the station began being served by Hellenic Train, the rebranded TranOSE.

The station is owned by GAIAOSE, which since 3 October 2001 owns most railway stations in Greece: the company was also in charge of rolling stock from December 2014 until October 2025, when Greek Railways (the owner of the Airport–Patras railway) took over that responsibility.

== Facilities ==
The ground-level station is assessed via stairs or a ramp. It has one Island platform & one Side platform, with station buildings located on platform 3 (the eastbound platform), with access to the platform level via stairs or lifts from a subway, a siding can also be found just east of the station platform 3. The Station buildings are equipped with a staffed booking office, toilets & automatic ticket barriers located at the entrance to the station. At platform level, there are sheltered seating, an air-conditioned indoor passenger shelter and Dot-matrix display departure and arrival screens and timetable poster boards on both platforms. Currently (2019), there is a local bus connecting the station, a large car park and taxi rank, all located at the station forecourt.

== Services ==
Since 22 November 2025, the following services call at this station:

- Athens Suburban Railway Line A4 between Piraeus and Kiato, with up to one train per hour.

The station is also served by local and regional buses:

KTEL operates Lines 861 & 863

== Station layout ==
L Ground/Concourse	Customer service	Tickets/Exits
Level; Ε1
Level; Ε1	Platform 1	In non-regular use
Level; Ε1	Island platform, doors on the right
Level; Ε1	Platform 2	← to Kiato (Nea Peramos)
Level; Ε1	Platform 3	to Piraeus (Aspropyrgos) →
Level; Ε1	Island platform, doors on the right/left
Level; Ε1	Platform 4	In non-regular use

== See also ==
- Railway stations in Greece
- Greek Railways
- Hellenic Railways Organization
- TrainOSE
- Proastiakos
