= Kineta railway station =

Railway station in Attica, Greece

Κινέττα Kinetta
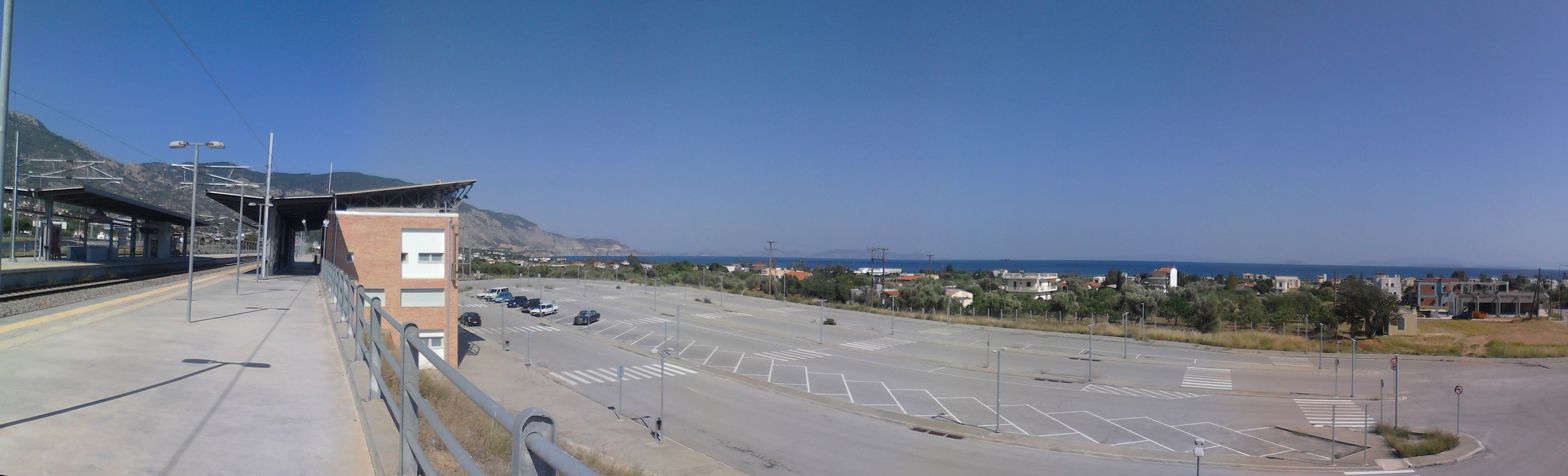
- A view of the station, April 2012.

General information
- Location: Kineta; West Attica; Greece
- Coordinates: 37.965366°N 23.201099°E
- Owner: GAIAOSE
- Operator: Hellenic Train
- Line: Airport–Patras railway
- Platforms: 2
- Tracks: 2

Construction
- Structure type: at-grade
- Platform levels: 2
- Parking: Yes
- Cycle facilities: Yes
- Accessible: Yes

Other information
- Status: Staffed (2019)

Key dates
- 27 September 2005: Opened
- 12 December 2010: Electrified

Services
Preceding station	Suburban Rail	Following station
Agioi Theodoroi towards Kiato	Line A4	Megara towards Piraeus
Location

Kineta railway station (Greek: Σιδηροδρομικός σταθμός Κινέττας, romanized: Sidirodromikós Stathmós Kinetas), also known as Kinetta, is a train station in Kineta, West Attica, Greece. It is located just north of the town, adjacent to the A8 motorway. It was opened on 27 September 2005 as part of the extension of the Athens Airport–Patras railway to Corinth. The station is served by the Athens Suburban Railway between Piraeus and Kiato. It is the westernmost railway station in Attica.

== History ==
The station was opened on 27 September 2005 as part of the extension of the Athens Airport–Patras railway to Corinth, as part of Line 2 of the Athens Suburban Railway began serving the station. built to a simmer layout and design to Nea Peramos, the station was further updated its current form dates to 2007. In 2009, with the Greek debt crisis unfolding OSE's Management was forced to reduce services across the network. Timetables were cutback and routes closed, as the government-run entity attempted to reduce overheads. In 2017 OSE's passenger transport sector was privatised as TrainOSE, currently a wholly owned subsidiary of Ferrovie dello Stato Italiane infrastructure, including stations, remained under the control of OSE. In July 2022, the station began being served by Hellenic Train, the rebranded TranOSE.

The station is owned by GAIAOSE, which since 3 October 2001 owns most railway stations in Greece: the company was also in charge of rolling stock from December 2014 until October 2025, when Greek Railways (the owner of the Airport–Patras railway) took over that responsibility.

== Facilities ==
The raised level station is assessed via stairs or lifts. It has two Side platforms, with station buildings located on platform 1 (the eastbound platform), with access to the platform level via stairs or lifts from a subway. The Station buildings are equipped with a staffed booking office, ticket-purchasing facilities & toilets at the entrance to the station. At platform level, there are sheltered seating, an air-conditioned indoor passenger shelter and Dot-matrix display departure and arrival screens and timetable poster boards on both platforms. Currently (2021), there is a regional bus stop (with hourly connections to Kiato and Piraeus), a large "park & ride" car park and taxi rank all located at the station forecourt.

== Services ==
Since 22 November 2025, the following services call at this station:

- Athens Suburban Railway Line A4 between Piraeus and Kiato, with up to one train per hour.

== Station layout ==
L Ground/Concourse	Customer service	Tickets/Exits
Level; L1	Side platform, doors will open on the right
Level; L1	Platform 1	← to Kiato (Agioi Theodoroi)
Level; L1	Platform 2	to Piraeus (Megara) →
Level; L1	Side platform, doors will open on the right

== See also ==
- Greek railway stations
- Hellenic Railways Organization
- Hellenic Train
- Proastiakos
