= Nea Peramos railway station =

Railway station in West Attica, Greece

Νέα Πέραμος Nea Peramos

General information
- Location: Nea Peramos, 191 00, Megara; West Attica; Greece
- Coordinates: 38°00′46″N 23°24′51″E
- Owner: GAIAOSE
- Operator: Hellenic Train
- Line: Airport–Patras railway
- Platforms: 2
- Tracks: 2

Construction
- Structure type: at-grade
- Platform levels: 1
- Parking: 100 Spaces
- Cycle facilities: No
- Accessible: Yes

Other information
- Status: Staffed
- Website: http://www.ose.gr/en/

Key dates
- 27 September 2005: Opened
- 12 December 2010: Electrified

Services
Preceding station	Suburban Rail	Following station
Megara towards Kiato	Line A4	Magoula towards Piraeus
Location

Nea Peramos railway station (Greek: Σιδηροδρομικός σταθμός Νέας Περάμου, romanized: Sidirodromikós Stathmós Nea Peramos) is a station in Nea Peramos, a suburb of the city of Megara, West Attica, Greece. It is located east of Megara, near the A8 motorway between Athens and Patras. It was opened on 27 September 2005 as part of the extension of the Athens Airport–Patras railway to Corinth and its current form dates to 2007. The station is served by the Athens Suburban Railway between Piraeus and Kiato. It should not be confused with the now-closed station on the old Piraeus–Patras railway, which is located within the city itself.

== History ==
The station was opened on 27 September 2005 as part of the extension of the Athens Airport–Patras railway to Corinth, as part of Line 2 of the Athens Suburban Railway began serving the station. The station was further updated its current form dates to 2007. It should not be confused with the now-closed station on the old Piraeus–Patras railway SPAP, located within the city. In 2009, with the Greek debt crisis unfolding OSE's Management was forced to reduce services across the network. Timetables were cutback and routes closed, as the government-run entity attempted to reduce overheads. In 2017 OSE's passenger transport sector was privatised as TrainOSE, currently, a wholly owned subsidiary of Ferrovie dello Stato Italiane infrastructure, including stations, remained under the control of OSE. In July 2022, the station began being served by Hellenic Train, the rebranded TranOSE.

The station is owned by GAIAOSE, which since 3 October 2001 owns most railway stations in Greece: the company was also in charge of rolling stock from December 2014 until October 2025, when Greek Railways (the owner of the Airport–Patras railway) took over that responsibility.

== Facilities ==
The raised station is assessed via stairs or lift. It has two side platforms, with station buildings located on platform 1, with access to the platform level via stairs or lift. The Station buildings are equipped with a staffed ticket office, toilets and cafe 'Platform 9 3/4 - coffee and more'. At platform level, there are sheltered seating an air-conditioned indoor passenger shelter and Dot-matrix display departure and arrival screens and timetable poster boards on both platforms. There is a car park on-site, adjacent to the eastbound line. Currently, there is no local bus stop connecting the station.

== Services ==
Since 22 November 2025, the following services call at this station:

- Athens Suburban Railway Line A4 between Piraeus and Kiato, with up to one train per hour.

== Station layout ==
L Ground/Concourse	Customer service	Tickets/Exits
Level; L1	Side platform, doors will open on the right
Level; L1	Platform 1	← to Kiato (Megara)
Level; L1	Platform 2	to Piraeus (Magoula) →
Level; L1	Side platform, doors will open on the right
