= Line A4 (Athens Suburban Railway) =

Rapid transit line in Athens, Greece

Line A4 (Piraeus–Kiato)
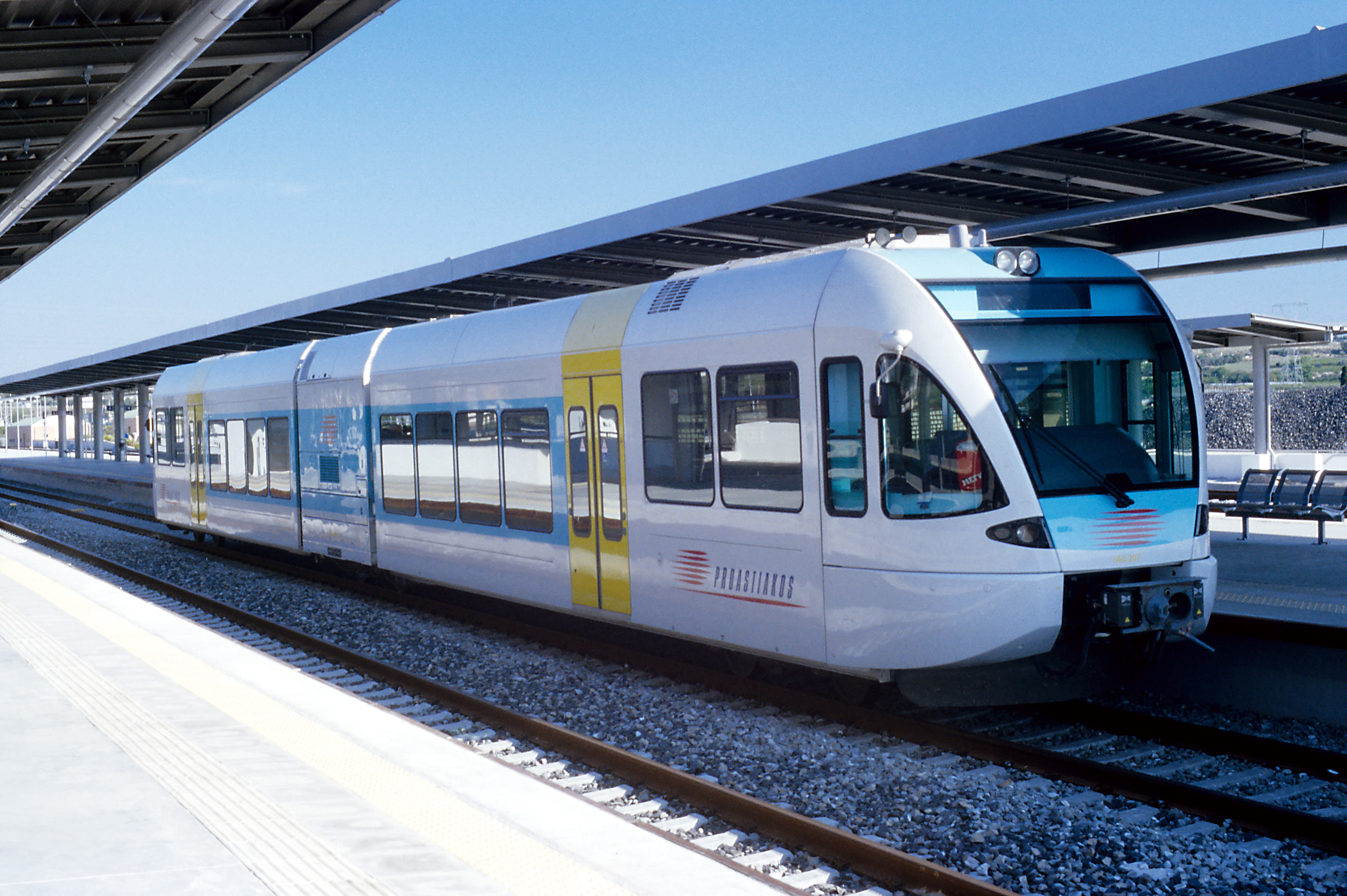
- A Siemens built OSE class 460 awaiting departure at Corinth, October 2005

Overview
- Service type: Commuter rail; Regional rail
- Status: Operating
- Locale: Attica and Peloponnese, Greece
- First service: 27 September 2005 – 12 December 2010 (first iteration) 30 July 2017; 9 years ago
- Current operator: Hellenic Train
- Former operator: TrainOSE (2005–2022)
- Website: www.hellenictrain.gr

Route
- Termini: Piraeus; Kiato
- Stops: 20
- Distance travelled: 120.7 km (75.0 mi)
- Average journey time: 1 hour and 43 minutes
- Service frequency: 18 pairs per day
- Lines used: Piraeus–Platy; Athens Airport–Patras

Technical
- Rolling stock: OSE class 460 (EMU)
- Track gauge: 1,435 mm (4 ft 8 1/2 in) standard gauge
- Operating speed: 130 km/h (81 mph) (maximum)
- Track owners: Greek Railways (tracks); GAIAOSE (stations)

Line A4 is an Athens Suburban Railway (Proastiakos) line in Athens, Greece, managed by Hellenic Train. The service connects Piraeus with the coastal town of Kiato, via intermediate towns and cities in western Attica and Corinthia. The line shares a part of its course with lines A1 and A3 out of Athens railway station and has an interchange with line A2 at Ano Liosia. The first iteration of the line was inaugurated on 27 September 2005, between Athens and Corinth via Neratziotissa. The service was reinstated on 30 July 2017, with the completion of the electrification until Athens in 2017 and Piraeus in 2018.

== History ==
An indirect standard gauge train service between Athens and Corinth started on 27 September 2005 after seven months of testing. The service was extended from Athens to Piraeus on 4 June 2007, and from Corinth to Kiato on 9 July 2007. It initially used Class 560 DMUs, and had to reverse at Neratziotissa via a siding.

The first direct trains between Piraeus and Kiato, which did not have to reverse at Neratziotissa, ran on 6 July 2008, with the completion of the westbound track curve at the Acharnes Railway Center (SKA). Between 12 December 2010 and 29 July 2017 the service was suspended, and electric train services using Class 460 EMUs were introduced between Kiato and Athens Airport, forcing passengers heading to and from Piraeus and Athens to change at Ano Liosia for the non-electrified service into the urban area. Due to further service cuts, the interchange was moved to SKA between 25 June 2012 and 9 February 2014.

Direct services between Athens and Kiato were restored with the electrification of the Piraeus–Platy railway from Agioi Anargyroi to Athens on 30 July 2017, and then to Piraeus on 1 February 2018. The line now exclusively uses Class 460 EMUs rolling stock.

== Route ==
Line A4 follows the Piraeus–Platy railway from Piraeus to Kato Acharnes, alongside side line A1 and line A3 after Athens Central, however the latter does not stop at Kato Acharnes and Pyrgos Vasilissis. Afterwards, it curves west into the Athens Airport–Patras railway via the westbound tracks with inactive platforms at SKA. It then follows the Airport–Patras railway, parallel to the A6 and A8 motorways until Kiato.

As of September 2026, there are 18 pairs of trains per day, with a frequency of one train per hour. (Note: For the last Piraeus-bound service, the train terminates at Tavros.) There is also a special, early-morning Athens–Kiato service which stops only at Ano Liosia, Magoula, Megara, Corinth and Zevgolatio.

=== Map ===
The route of Line A4

== Stations ==
The spelling of the station names on this table, in English and Greek, are according to the signage.

†	Terminal station
#	Interchange station

Station English	Station Greek	Regional unit	Opened	Interchanges and notes	Position
Piraeus ^{†#}	Πειραιάς	Piraeus	30 June 1884 rebuilt 2007	Start of common section with Line A1. Interchange with Athens Metro Line 3.	37.949095°N 23.643430°E
Lefka	Λεύκα	Piraeus	30 June 1884 rebuilt 2007		37.955375°N 23.653910°E
Rentis	Ρέντης	Piraeus	30 June 1884 rebuilt 2007		37.962320°N 23.668540°E
Tauros	Ταύρος	South Athens	1 October 2014	Opened as an infill station.	37.968745°N 23.693320°E
Rouf	Ρουφ	Central Athens; South Athens	30 June 1884 rebuilt 2007		37.973735°N 23.704055°E
Athina ^{#}	Αθήνα	Central Athens	8 March 1904	Interchange with intercity and regional services, Line A3 to Chalcis, and Athens Metro Line 2 at Larissa Station.	37.992365°N 23.720215°E
Agioi Anargyroi ^{#}	Άγιοι Ανάργυροι	West Athens	8 August 2010	Interchange with Line A3 to Chalcis. Opened as an infill station.	38.021770°N 23.718380°E
Pyrgos Vasilissis	Πύργος Βασιλίσσης	West Athens	27 February 2014	Opened as an infill station.	38.039610°N 23.727395°E
Kato Acharnai ^{#}	Κάτω Αχαρναί	East Attica	27 February 2014	End of common section with Line A1. Opened as an infill station.	38.054065°N 23.732580°E
Zefyri	Ζεφύρι	West Attica	10 May 2018	Opened as an infill station.	38.069790°N 23.716910°E
Ano Liosia ^{#}	Άνω Λιόσια	West Attica	18 July 2006	Interchange with Line A2 to Athens Airport. Opened as an infill station.	38.070695°N 23.710135°E
Aspropyrgos	Ασπρόπυργος	West Attica	18 July 2006	Opened as an infill station.	38.080925°N 23.604395°E
Magoula	Μαγούλα	West Attica	18 July 2006	Opened as an infill station.	38.073595°N 23.529505°E
Nea Peramos	Νέα Πέραμος	West Attica	27 September 2005		38.013305°N 23.414450°E
Megara	Μέγαρα	West Attica	27 September 2005		37.990905°N 23.361015°E
Kinetta	Κινέττα	West Attica	27 September 2005		37.965390°N 23.200985°E
Agioi Theodori	Άγιοι Θεόδωροι	Corinthia	27 September 2005		37.933185°N 23.136995°E
Korinthos	Κόρινθος	Corinthia	27 September 2005		37.920995°N 22.932585°E
Zevgolatio	Ζευγολατιό	Corinthia	8 July 2012	Opened as an infill station.	37.925965°N 22.805655°E
Kiato ^{†#}	Κιάτο	Corinthia	9 July 2007	Interchange with regional services to Aigio.	38.013995°N 22.73469°E

== See also ==
- Hellenic Railways Organisation
- Hellenic Train
- Proastiakos
