= Kineta =

Kineta Κινέτα
- Community
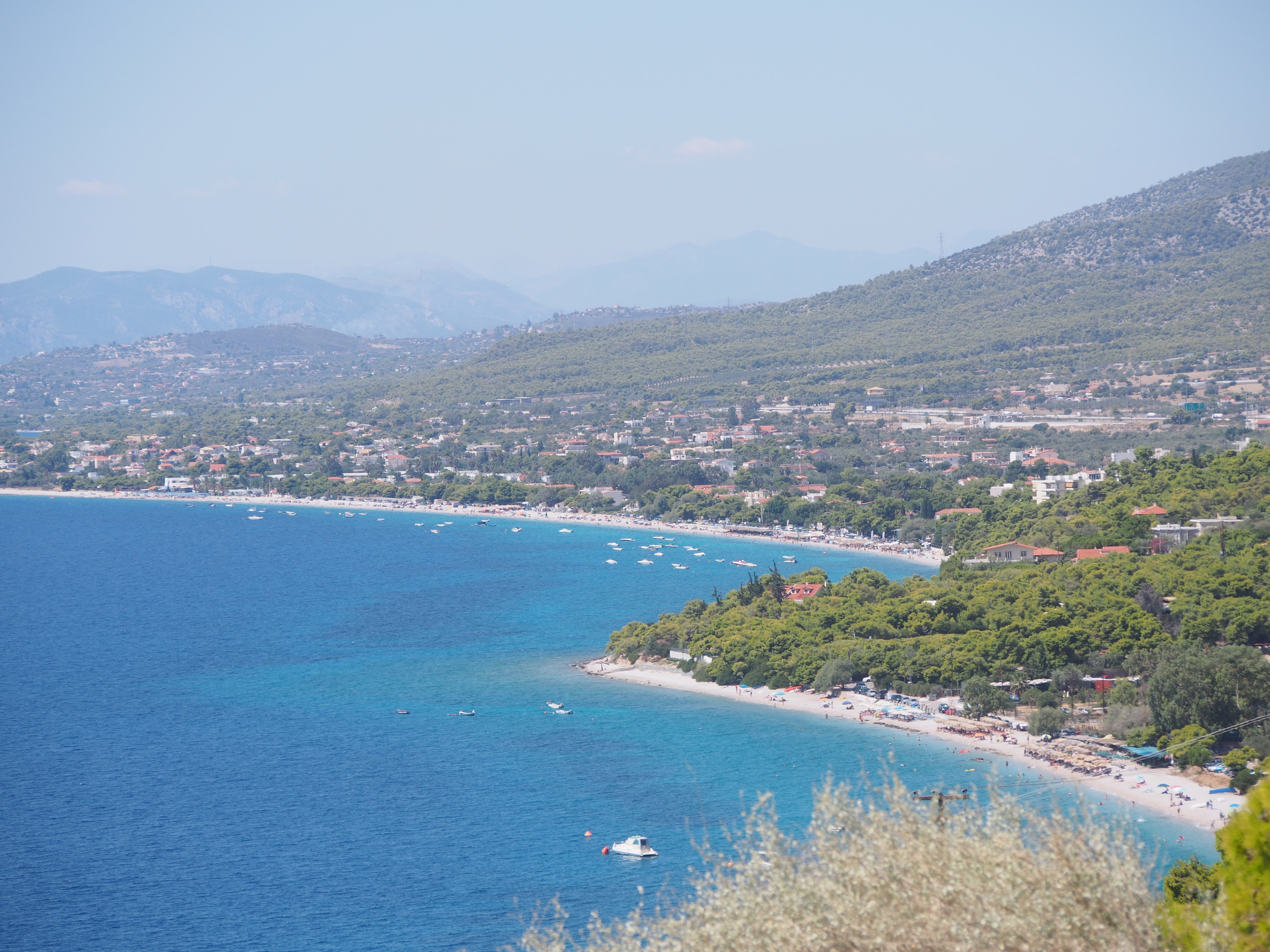
- Kineta

- Location within Greece
- Coordinates: 37°58.3′N 23°12.9′E
- Country: Greece
- Administrative region: Attica
- Regional unit: West Attica
- Municipality: Megara
- Municipal unit: Megara

Population (2021)
  - Community: 1,651
- Time zone: UTC+2 (EET)
  - Summer (DST): UTC+3 (EEST)
- Postal code: 191 00
- Area code: 22960

Kineta (Greek: Κινέτα) is a beach town in West Attica, Greece. Since 2017 it is a separate community of the municipality Megara.

== Name ==
The name "Kineta" comes from the Albanian word "këneta", which means "small lagoon" or "marsh". In 1700, the town was mentioned in a Venetian map as Valle Chineta. The lagoon does not exist anymore but Kineta still has (2010) more than its share of gnats.

== History ==
In antiquity the temple of Apollo Latous (Latoan Apollo) was located near Kineta. The temple marked the boundary between Corinthia and Megaris in the time of Pausanias. A little above the temple the road to Megara passed over the Scironian rocks.

On 23 July 2018, a wildfire developed in the area, which burned a few houses in Kineta.

== Geography ==
Kineta is situated on the northern coast of the Saronic Gulf, south of the Geraneia mountains. The rocks of Kakia Skala lie to the east. The nearest towns are Agioi Theodoroi (8 km to the southwest) and Megara (12 km to the east). Corinth is 25 km to the west, and Athens is 45 km to the east. The old Greek National Road 8 and the new A8 motorway (Olympia Odos), both connecting Athens with Corinth and the Peloponnese, pass through the town. The Kineta railway station is served by Proastiakos trains between Athens International Airport and Kiato (Peloponnese).

== Historical population ==
Historical population
Year	Pop.	±%
1961	187	—
1971	163	−12.8%
1981	425	+160.7%
1991	1,878	+341.9%
2001	1,433	−23.7%
2011	1,446	+0.9%
2021	1,651	+14.2%

== Gallery ==
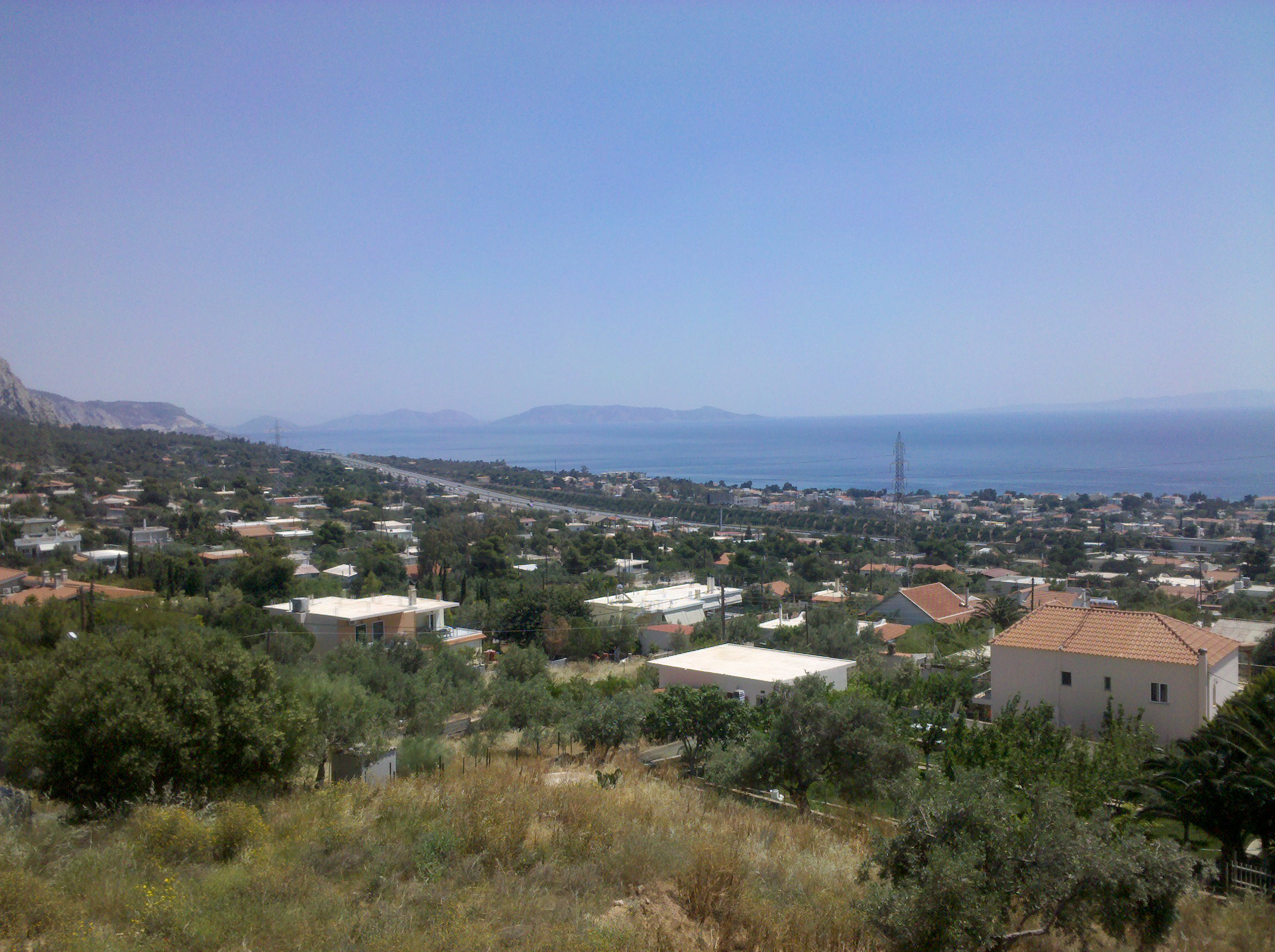
SE View of Kineta (LTR: Kakia Skala, Salamis Island, Ægina)

== See also ==
- Communities of Attica
