= Megara railway station =

Railway station in Megara, Greece

Μέγαρα Megara

General information
- Location: Megara; West Attica; Greece
- Coordinates: 37°59′28″N 23°21′40″E
- Owner: GAIAOSE
- Operator: Hellenic Train
- Line: Airport–Patras railway
- Platforms: 3

Construction
- Structure type: at-grade
- Platform levels: 2
- Parking: Yes
- Cycle facilities: No
- Accessible: Yes

Other information
- Status: Staffed
- Website: http://www.ose.gr/en/

Key dates
- 27 September 2005: Opened
- 12 December 2010: Electrified

Services
Preceding station	Suburban Rail	Following station
Kinetta towards Kiato	Line A4	Nea Peramos towards Piraeus
Location

Megara railway station (Greek: Σιδηροδρομικός Σταθμός Μεγάρων, romanized: Sidirodromikós Stathmós Megáron) is a station in the city of Megara, West Attica, Greece. It is located east of Megara, near the A8 motorway between Athens and Patras. It was opened on 27 September 2005 as part of the extension of the Athens Airport–Patras railway to Corinth and its current form dates to 2007. It has two side platforms and a siding. The station is served by the Athens Suburban Railway between Piraeus and Kiato. It should not be confused with the now-closed station on the old Piraeus–Patras railway, which is located within the city itself.

== History ==
The station was opened on 27 September 2005 as part of the extension of the Athens Airport–Patras railway to Corinth, as part of Line 2 of the Athens Suburban Railway began serving the station. The station further updated its current form dates to 2007. It should not be confused with the now-closed station on the old Piraeus–Patras railway SPAP, located within the city. In 2008, all Athens Suburban Railway services were transferred from OSE to TrainOSE. In 2009, with the Greek debt crisis unfolding OSE's Management was forced to reduce services across the network. Timetables were cutback and routes closed, as the government-run entity attempted to reduce overheads. In 2017 OSE's passenger transport sector was privatised as TrainOSE, currently a wholly owned subsidiary of Ferrovie dello Stato Italiane infrastructure, including stations, remained under the control of OSE. In July 2022, the station began being served by Hellenic Train, the rebranded TranOSE.

The station is owned by GAIAOSE, which since 3 October 2001 owns most railway stations in Greece: the company was also in charge of rolling stock from December 2014 until October 2025, when Greek Railways (the owner of the Airport–Patras railway) took over that responsibility.

== Facilities ==
The ground level station is assessed via stairs or a ramp. It has one Island platform & one Side platform, with station buildings located on platform 3 (the eastbound platform), with access to the platform level via stairs or lifts from a subway; a siding can also be found just east of the station platform 3. The Station buildings are equipped with a staffed booking office, toilets & automatic ticket barriers located at the entrance to the station. At platform level, there are sheltered seating, an air-conditioned indoor passenger shelter and Dot-matrix display departure and arrival screens and timetable poster boards on both platforms. Currently (2019), there is a local bus connecting the station, a large car park and taxi rank, all located at the station forecourt.

== Services ==
Since 22 November 2025, the following services call at this station:

- Athens Suburban Railway Line A4 between Piraeus and Kiato, with up to one train per hour.

== Station layout ==
Level; Ε1	Platform 1	In non-regular use
Level; Ε1	Island platform, doors on the right
Level; Ε1	Platform 2	← to Kiato (Kinetta)
Level; Ε1	Through lines	In non-regular use
Level; Ε1	Platform 3	to Piraeus (Nea Peramos) →
Level; Ε1	Side platform, doors on the right
L Ground/Concourse	Customer service	Tickets; Exits

== See also ==
- Railway stations in Greece
- Hellenic Railways Organization
- Hellenic Train
- Proastiakos
