= Aspropyrgos railway station =

Station on the Proastiakos railway of Athens, Greece

Ασπρόπυργος Aspropyrgos

General information
- Location: Aspropyrgos; West Attica; Greece
- Coordinates: 38°04′51″N 23°36′15″E
- Owner: GAIAOSE
- Operator: Hellenic Train
- Line: Airport–Patras railway
- Platforms: 4
- Tracks: 4

Construction
- Structure type: at-grade
- Depth: 2
- Platform levels: 1
- Parking: Yes
- Cycle facilities: No
- Accessible: Yes

Key dates
- 27 September 2005: Line opened
- 18 July 2006: Station opened
- 12 December 2010: Line electrified

Services
Preceding station	Suburban Rail	Following station
Magoula towards Kiato	Line A4	Ano Liosia towards Piraeus
Location

Aspropyrgos Railway Station (Greek: Σιδηροδρομικός Σταθμός Ασπροπύργου, romanized: Sidirodromikós Stathmós Aspropýrgou) is a train station in the municipality of Aspropyrgos, West Attica, Greece. The station is located north of the residential area, on the Athens Airport–Patras railway. The station is served by the Athens Suburban Railway between Piraeus and Kiato. It is located adjacent to the Thriasian Plain freight yard owned by OSE.

== History ==
It opened on 18 July 2006 and should not be confused with the older station on the Piraeus–Patras railway that is located further south, inside the town of Aspropyrgos. In 2008, all Athens Suburban Railway services were transferred from OSE to TrainOSE. In 2009, with the Greek debt crisis unfolding OSE's Management was forced to reduce services across the network. Timetables were cutback and routes closed, as the government-run entity attempted to reduce overheads. In 2017 OSE's passenger transport sector was privatised as TrainOSE, currently, a wholly owned subsidiary of Ferrovie dello Stato Italiane infrastructure, including stations, remained under the control of OSE. In August 2021, a train (train 1329 Kiato to Piraeus) on approach to the station was attacked by stones, damaging the driver's cab. In July 2022, the station began being served by Hellenic Train, the rebranded TranOSE.

The station is owned by GAIAOSE, which since 3 October 2001 owns most railway stations in Greece: the company was also in charge of rolling stock from December 2014 until October 2025, when Greek Railways (the owner of the Airport–Patras railway) took over that responsibility.

== Facilities ==
The ground-level station is located via stairs or a ramp. It has 2 island platforms, with the main station buildings located on the westbound platform. As of (2021) the station has waiting shelters on the platforms and staffed booking office. There is no cafe or shop on-site. At platform level, there are sheltered seating, Dot-matrix display departure or arrival screens and timetable poster boards on all the platforms. There are lifts and stairs to both raised Island platform's. The station is equipped with a large car park and bus stop on the forecourt at the entrance to the station, where the local 855, 881 call.

It is adjacent to the Thriasian Plain freight yard owned by OSE.

== Services ==
Since 22 November 2025, the following services call at this station:

- Athens Suburban Railway Line A4 between Piraeus and Kiato, with up to one train per hour.

== Station layout ==
L Ground/Concourse	Customer service	Tickets/Exits
Level; L1
Level; L1	Platform 1	In non-regular use
Level; L1	Island platform, doors will open on the right
Level; L1	Platform 2	to Kiato (Magoula) ←
Level; L1	Platform 3	to Piraeus (Ano Liosia) →
Level; L1	Island platform, doors will open on the right
Level; L1	Platform 4	In non-regular use

== See also ==
- Railway stations in Greece
- Greek Railways
- Hellenic Railways Organization
- TrainOSE
- Proastiakos
