= Agioi Theodoroi railway station =

Railway station in Corinthia, Peloponnese, Greece

Άγιοι Θεόδωροι Agioi Theodori
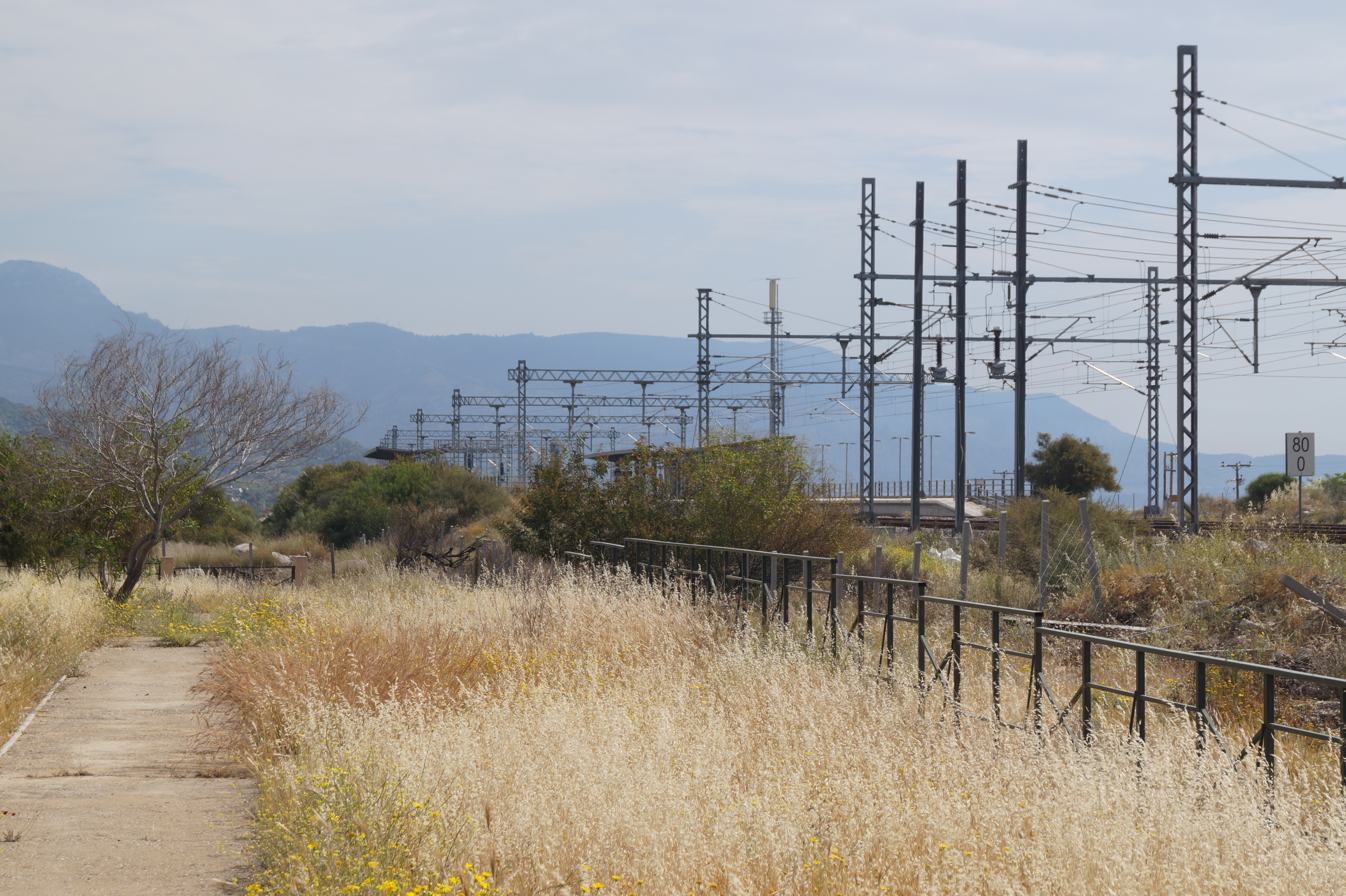
- View of the station in the background, taken from the archaeological site of Agioi Theodoroi (April 2016)

General information
- Location: Agioi Theodoroi; Corinthia; Greece
- Coordinates: 37.9331°N 23.1369°E
- Owner: GAIAOSE
- Operator: Hellenic Train
- Line: Airport–Patras railway

Construction
- Structure type: at-grade
- Parking: Yes
- Accessible: Yes

Key dates
- 27 September 2005: Opened
- 12 December 2010: Electrified

Services
Preceding station	Suburban Rail	Following station
Corinth towards Kiato	Line A4	Kineta towards Piraeus

Future services
Preceding station	Suburban Rail	Following station
Terminus	Line A4	Isthmos towards Piraeus
Location

Agioi Theodoroi railway station (Greek: Σιδηροδρομικός Σταθμός Αγίων Θεοδώρων, romanized: Sidirodromikós Stathmós Agíon Theodóron) is a train station in Agioi Theodoroi, Corinthia, Greece. It was opened on 27 September 2005 as part of the extension of the Athens Airport–Patras railway to Corinth. The station is served by the Athens Suburban Railway between Piraeus and Kiato.

== History ==
The station opened on 27 September 2005 as part of the extension of the Athens Airport–Patras railway to Corinth. In 2008, all Athens Suburban Railway services were transferred from OSE to TrainOSE. In 2017 OSE's passenger transport sector was privatised as TrainOSE, currently, a wholly owned subsidiary of Ferrovie dello Stato Italiane infrastructure, including stations, remained under the control of OSE. In July 2022, the station began being served by Hellenic Train, the rebranded TranOSE.

Currently (2025) work is going ahead on a branch line connecting Loutraki, with new stations at Michanikou and Isthmos. The project is converting the existing 6.4 km (4.0 mi) Isthmos-Loutraki single-metric line to a standard electric line, to connect to the SKA-KIATO High Speed Railway Line. The connection between high speed railway line and Isthmos Station will be signal track.

The station is owned by GAIAOSE, which since 3 October 2001 owns most railway stations in Greece: the company was also in charge of rolling stock from December 2014 until October 2025, when Greek Railways (the owner of the Airport–Patras railway) took over that responsibility.

== Services ==
Since 22 November 2025, the following services call at this station:

- Athens Suburban Railway Line A4 between Piraeus and Kiato, with up to one train per hour.

Currently (2025) work is going ahead on a branch line connecting Loutraki, with new stations at Michanikou and Isthmos.

== See also ==
- Railway stations in Greece
- Hellenic Railways Organization
- Hellenic Train
- Proastiakos
