= Megara General Aviation Airport =

- IATA: none; ICAO: LGMG

Summary
- Airport type: Public / Military
- Owner: Greek state
- Operator: HCAA
- Location: Megara
- Elevation AMSL: 12 ft (3.7 m)
- Coordinates: 37°58′52″N 23°21′55″E

Map
- Location of airport in Greece

Runways
| Direction | Length | | Surface |
| Direction | ft | m | Surface |
|---|---|---|---|
| 08/26 | 3,953 | 1,205 | Asphalt |
- Sources: HCAA, Our Airports, GTP

Megara/Pachi General Aviation Airport (ICAO: LGMG, HCAA: ΜΕΓΑΠ) is a general aviation airport near Pachi, Attica, Greece. It is located approximately 2 km (1.2 mi) southeast of Megara and 60 km (37 mi) west of Athens. The airport is used exclusively by non-commercial general aviation aircraft.

== Facilities and aircraft ==
Megara General Aviation Airport is situated at an elevation of approximately 4 m (13 ft) above mean sea level. It has a asphalt runway designated 08/26, measuring approximately 1,205 m (3,953 ft) in length and 38 m (125 ft) in width. The runway is not equipped with runway lighting.

The airport terminal and administrative buildings have a total floor area of approximately 180 m^{2} (1,900 sq ft). They accommodate offices of the Hellenic Civil Aviation Authority, the Hellenic National Meteorological Service, and the Hellenic Police.

The airport provides approximately 100 parking positions for general aviation aircraft. It is classified as firefighting category III, with firefighting services provided by the military installation located at the airfield.

A number of private aviation companies, flight-training organisations and aero clubs operate from the airport, including the Megara Aero Club, the Arcadia Aero Club and the Hellenic Aviation Academy.

== Access ==
The airport is located near the Pachi interchange and is accessible from the Olympia Odos motorway and the old Athens–Corinth national road. Megara railway station is located nearby and is served by the Athens Suburban Railway.

== See also ==
- Transport in Greece
