= Aigio railway station =

Railway station in Peloponnese, Greece

Αίγιο Aigio
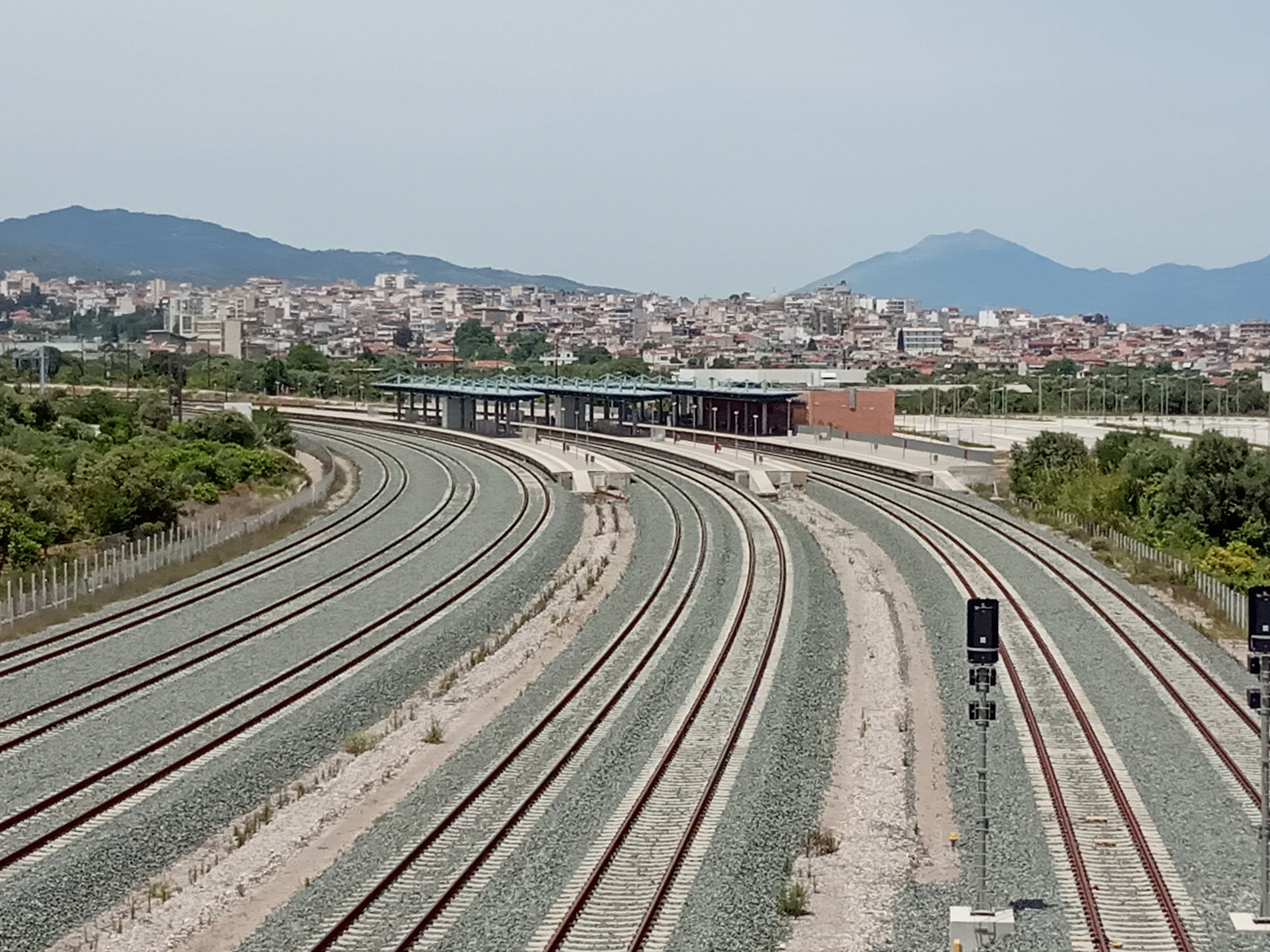
- Aigio railway station, view from the rail overpass near the station.

General information
- Location: Aigio; Achaea; Greece
- Coordinates: 38.2400°N 22.1035°E
- Owner: GAIAOSE
- Operator: Hellenic Train
- Line: Airport–Patras railway
- Platforms: 3
- Tracks: 7

Construction
- Structure type: at-grade
- Platform levels: 1
- Parking: Yes
- Cycle facilities: No

Other information
- Website: ose.gr/en

Key dates
- 22 June 2020: Opened

Services
Preceding station	Hellenic Train	Following station
Terminus	G7 Kiato-Aigio	Eliki towards Kiato
Location

Aigio railway station (Greek: Σιδηροδρομικός Σταθμός Αιγίου, romanized: Sidirodromikós Stathmós Aigíou) is a train station in Aigio in the northern Peloponnese, Greece. Since June 2020, it is served by Hellenic Train local services to Kiato. The station is located on the outskirts of Aigio, 2 kilometres (1.2 mi) from the town's centre.

== History ==
Construction was completed several years after the suspension of regional services on the metre-gauge railways of the Peloponnese in 2011. After a series of test runs commencing in April 2019, railway traffic to and from Aigio had been expected to resume in August 2019. However, a series of delays meant that the opening of the section between Aigio and Kiato was postponed until June 2020. Services finally commenced on 22 June 2020. The station is served by Hellenic Train local services to and from Kiato. The trains currently in use between Aigio and Kiato are the Stadler GTW 2/6 diesel multiple units, constructed by Stadler Rail in 2003. The electrification of the section between Aigio and Kiato will allow direct services to and from Athens; in the meantime, passengers must change between diesel and electric trains at Kiato. Travel time between the two stations is 53 minutes. In July 2022, the station began being served by Hellenic Train, the rebranded TranOSE.

The station is owned by GAIAOSE, which since 3 October 2001 owns most railway stations in Greece: the company was also in charge of rolling stock from December 2014 until October 2025, when Greek Railways (the owner of the Airport–Patras railway) took over that responsibility.

== Facilities ==
The station is equipped with waiting rooms, shelters, toilets and a cafe. There is also an unstaffed ticket office. Outside of the station there is a big parking lot (free parking). It is connected to the city centre by the local city bus. Road access to the station is provided by two narrow paved roads, which still need improvement (mainly widening and proper signage).

== Services ==
Since 22 November 2025, the following services call at this station:

- Hellenic Train local service between Kiato and Aigio, with six trains per day in each direction: passengers have to change at Kiato for Athens Suburban Railway trains towards Athens and Piraeus.

== Station layout ==
L Ground/Concourse	Customer service	Tickets/Exits
Level; Ε1	Side platform, doors on the right
Level; Ε1	Platform 1	Hellenic Train to Kiato (Eliki) →
Level; Ε1	Platform 2	Hellenic Train to Kiato (Eliki) →
Level; Ε1	Island platform, doors on the right
Level; Ε1	Platform 3	Hellenic Train to Kiato (Eliki) →
Level; Ε1	Platform 4	Hellenic Train to Kiato (Eliki) →
Level; Ε1	Island platform, doors on the right/left
Level; Ε1	Platform 5	In non-regular use
Level; Ε1	Through lines	Lines
Level; Ε1	Through lines	Lines

== Gallery ==
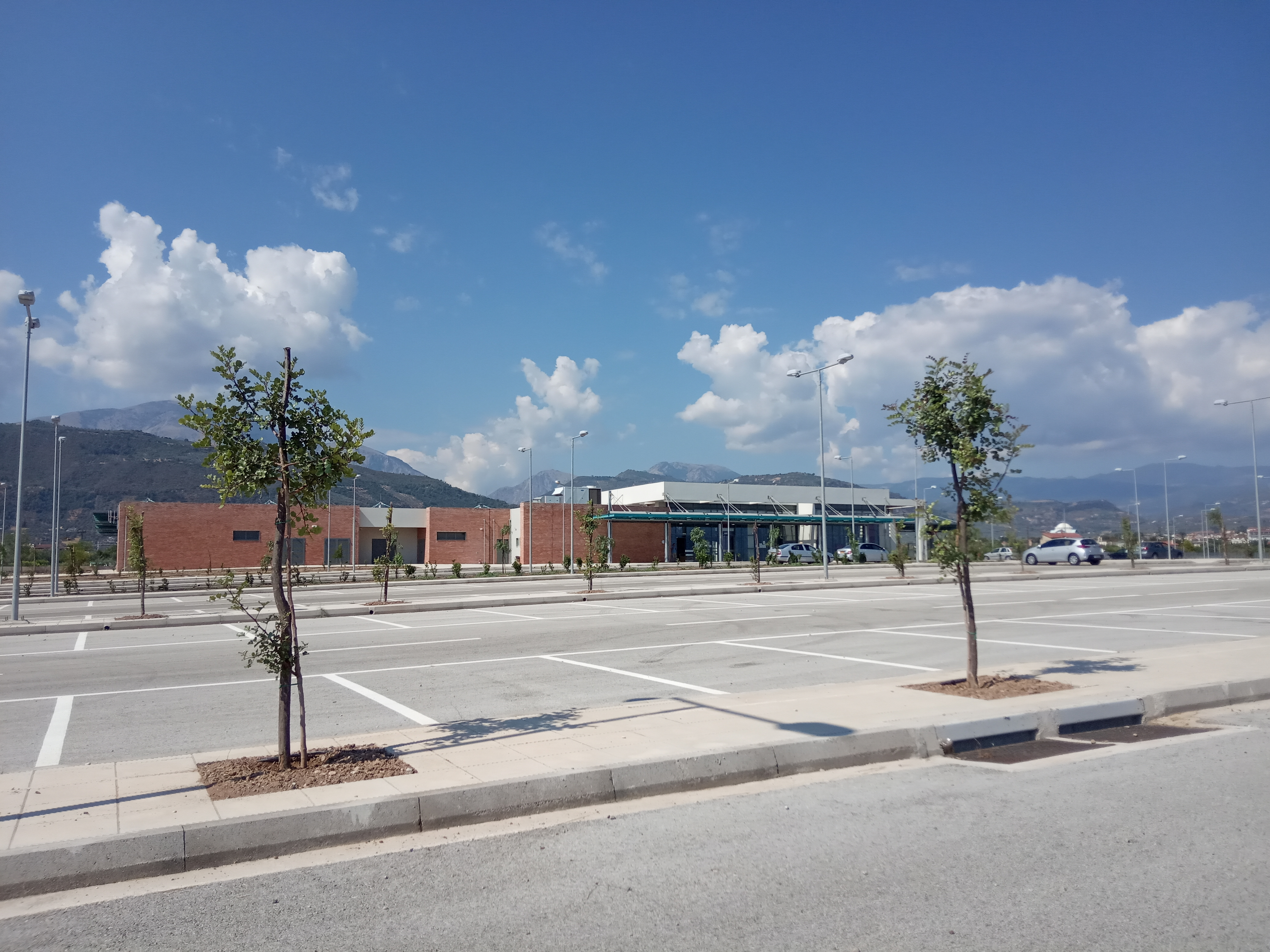
Outer view of the station building and the parking lot (July 2020)

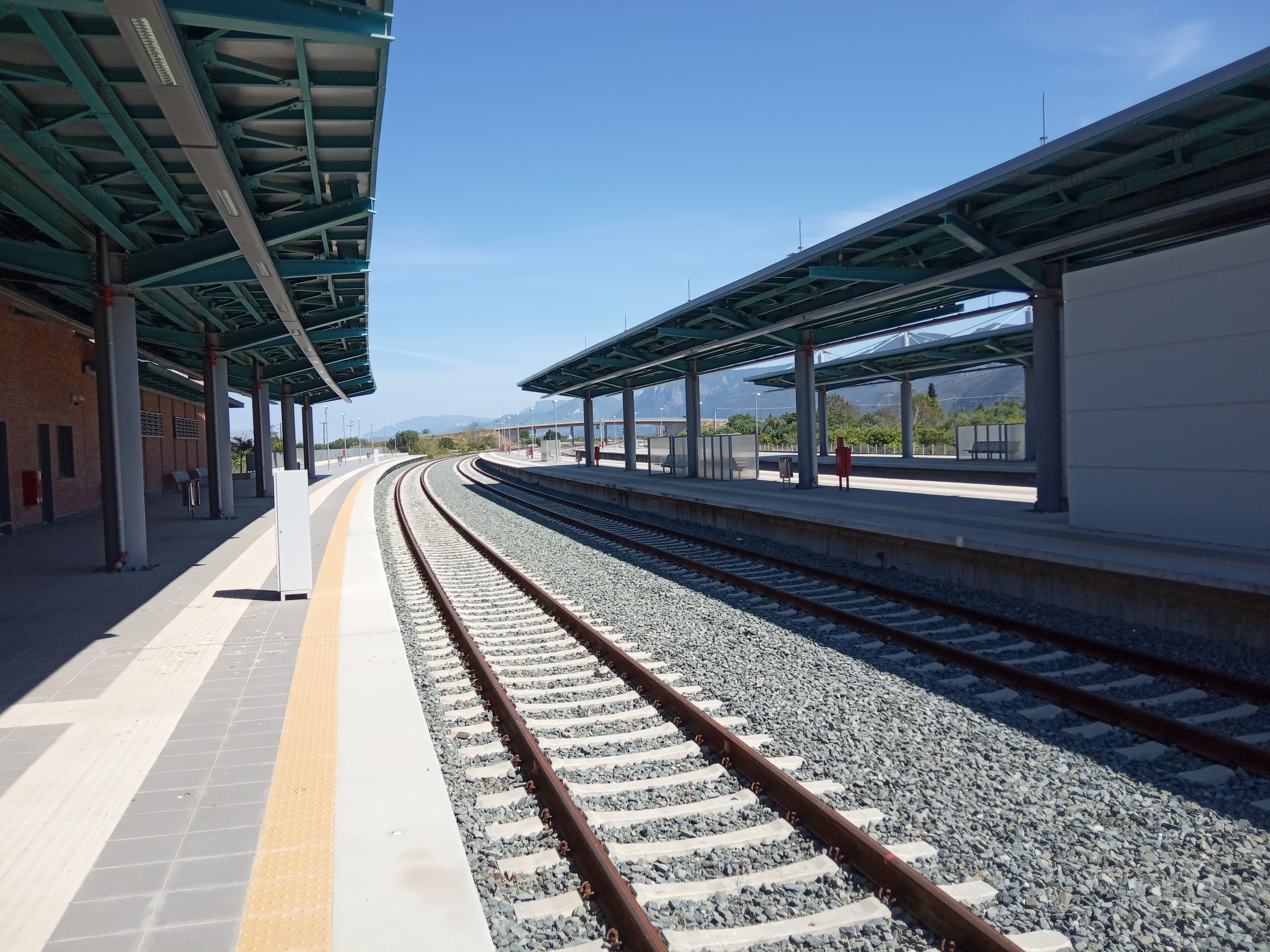
Tracks at the brand new Aigio railway station just a few days before the commencement of rail schedules. (June 2020)

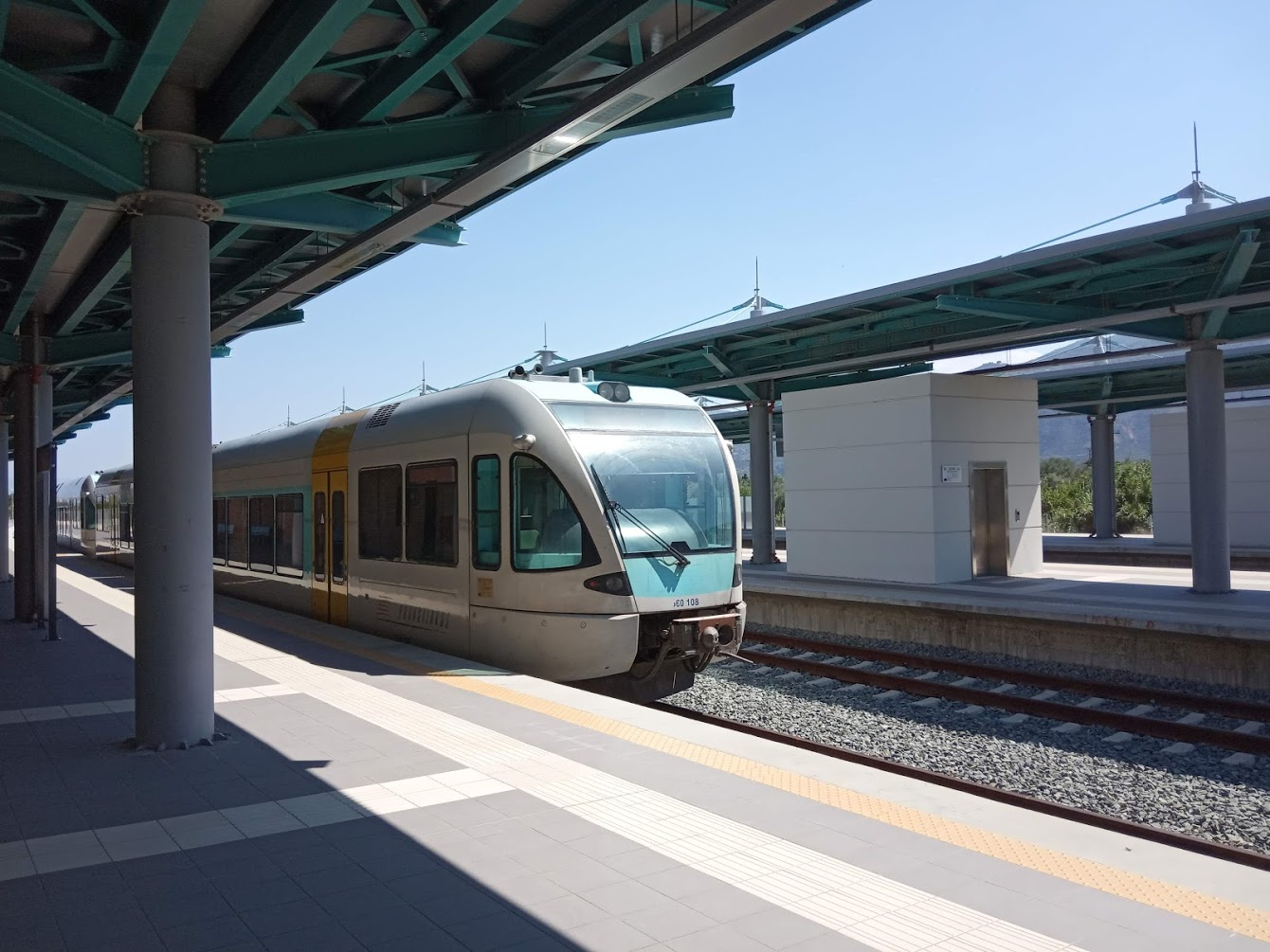
Stadler GTW 2/6 diesel articulated railcar at Aigio railway station

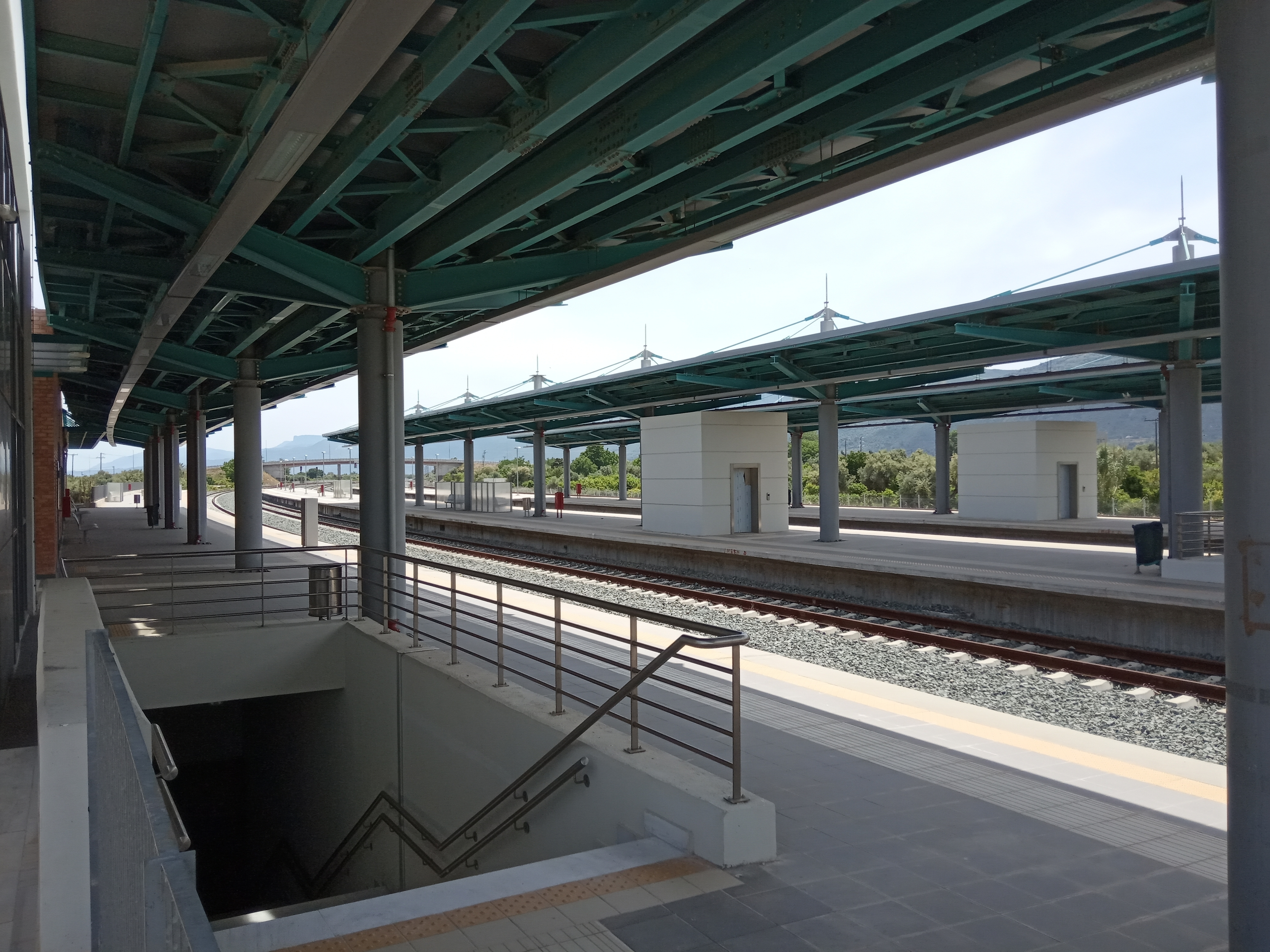
View of the first two platforms and the tracks, Aigio railway station, May 2019

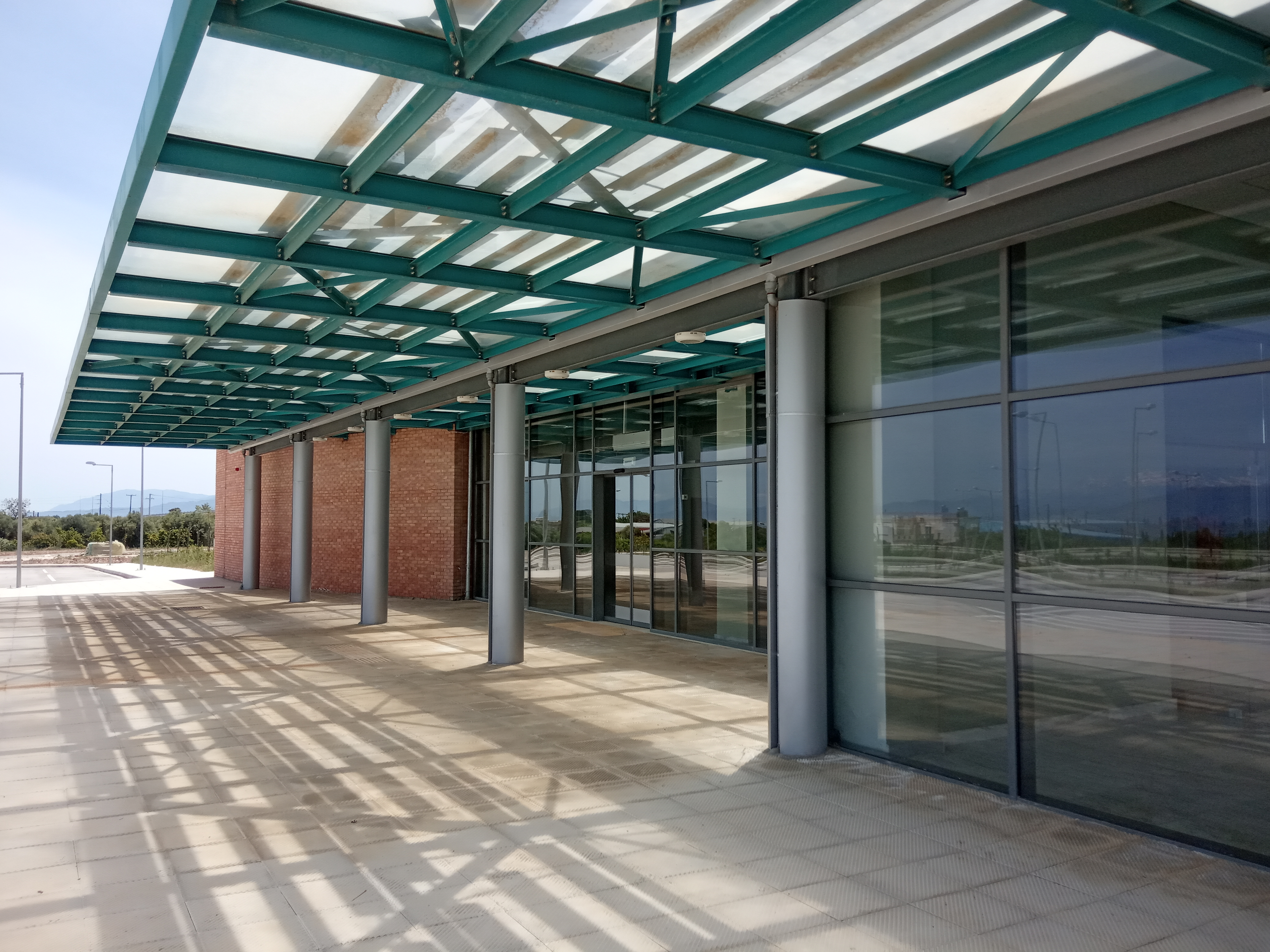
Main entrance of the station building (May 2019)

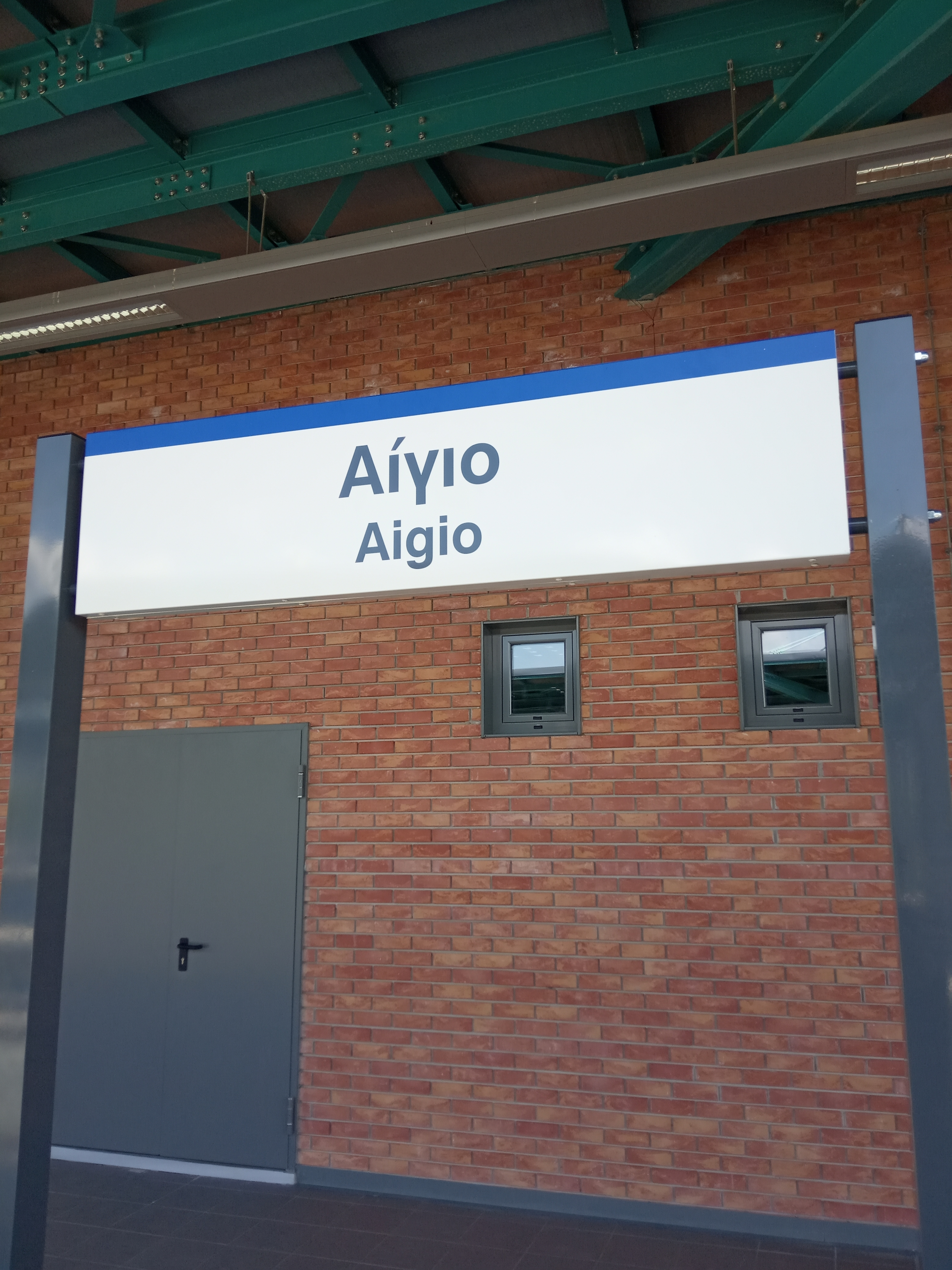
Sign on the platforms indicating the name of the railway station

== See also ==
- Corinth railway station
- Patras railway station
- Railway stations in Greece
- Hellenic Railways Organization
- Hellenic Train
- Proastiakos
