= Zevgolatio railway station =

Train station in Greece, near Corinth

Ζευγολατιό Zevgolatio

General information
- Location: Zevgolateio; Corinthia; Greece
- Coordinates: 37°55′34″N 22°48′20″E
- Owner: GAIAOSE
- Operator: Hellenic Train
- Line: Airport–Patras railway
- Platforms: 2
- Tracks: 2

Construction
- Structure type: At Grade
- Platform levels: 1
- Parking: Yes
- Accessible: Yes

Other information
- Status: Staffed
- Website: http://www.ose.gr/en/

Key dates
- 9 July 2007: Line opened
- 12 December 2010: Line electrified
- 8 July 2012: Station opened

Services
Preceding station	Suburban Rail	Following station
Kiato Terminus	Line A4	Corinth towards Piraeus
Location

Zevgolatio railway station (Greek: Σιδηροδρομικός Σταθμός Ζευγολατιού, romanized: Sidirodromikós Stathmós Zevgolatioú) is a train station in Zevgolateio in the northern Peloponnese, Greece. It was opened on 8 July 2012 on the section of the Athens Airport–Patras railway between Corinth and Kiato, and is located on the outskirts of the town near the A8 motorway between Athens and Patras. It is served by the Athens Suburban Railway between Piraeus and Kiato. In July 2022, the station began being served by Hellenic Train, the rebranded TranOSE.

== History ==
In 2017 OSE's passenger transport sector was privatised as TrainOSE, currently a wholly owned subsidiary of Ferrovie dello Stato Italiane infrastructure, including stations, remained under the control of OSE. In July 2022, the station began being served by Hellenic Train, the rebranded TranOSE.

The station is owned by GAIAOSE, which since 3 October 2001 owns most railway stations in Greece: the company was also in charge of rolling stock from December 2014 until October 2025, when Greek Railways (the owner of the Airport–Patras railway) took over that responsibility.

== Services ==
Since 22 November 2025, the following services call at this station:

- Athens Suburban Railway Line A4 between Piraeus and Kiato, with up to one train per hour.

== See also ==
- Railway stations in Greece
- Hellenic Railways Organization
- Hellenic Train
- Proastiakos
