= Pallini station =

Athens Suburban Railway and Athens Metro station

Παλλήνη Pallini
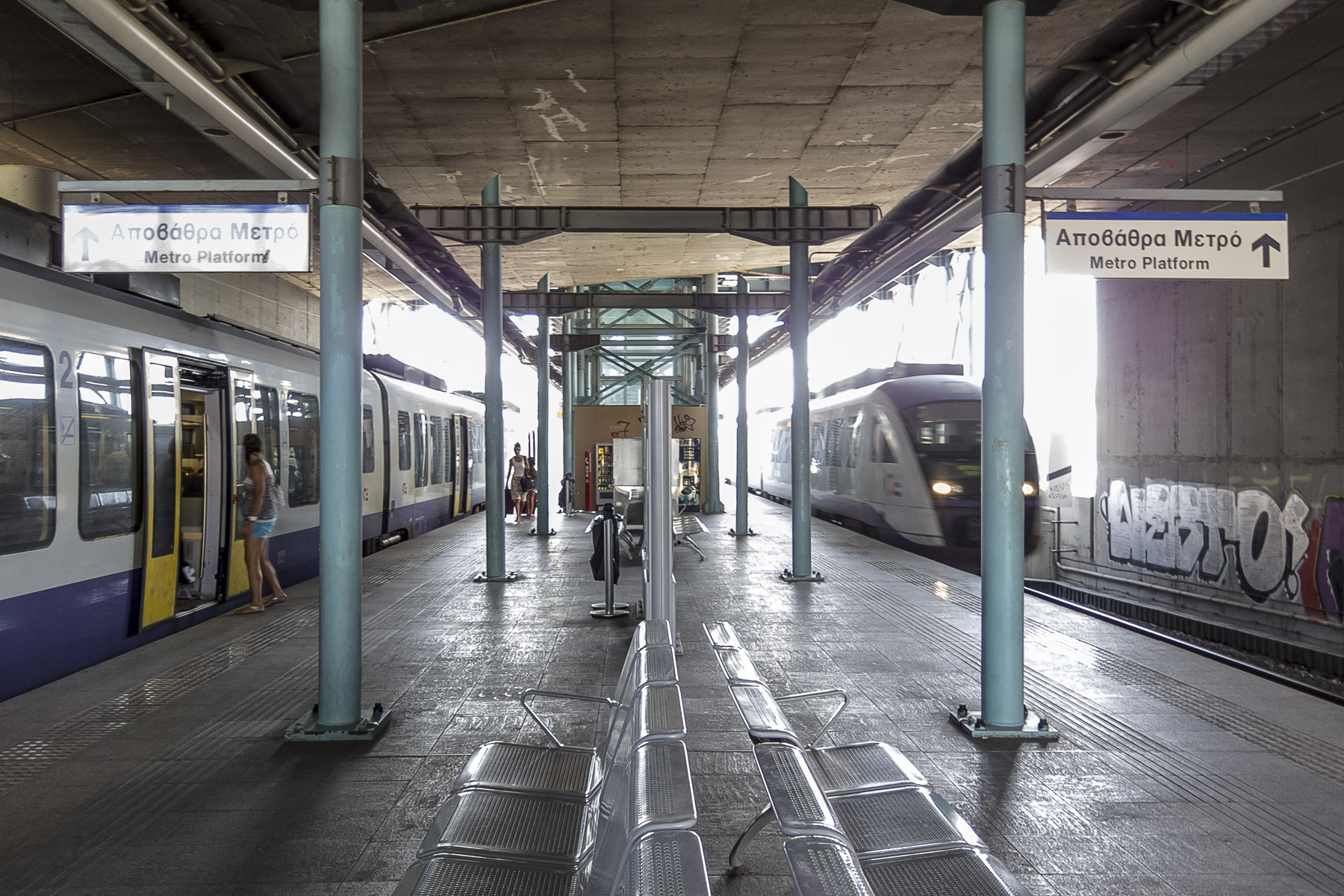
- Athens Suburban Railway platforms

General information
- Location: Pallini; Greece
- Coordinates: 38°00′19″N 23°52′11″E
- Owner: GAIAOSE
- Line: Airport–Patras railway
- Platforms: 2
- Tracks: 2
- Train operators: Hellenic Train (Suburban Rail); STASY (Metro)

Construction
- Structure type: At-grade
- Accessible: Yes

Key dates
- 30 July 2004: Opened
- September 2006: Rebuilt for Metro trains
- 4 June 2007: Suburban Rail electrified

Services
Preceding station	Suburban Rail	Following station
Doukissis Plakentias towards Piraeus	Line A1	Paiania–Kantza towards Athens Airport
Doukissis Plakentias towards Ano Liosia	Line A2	Paiania–Kantza towards Athens Airport
Preceding station	Athens Metro	Following station
Doukissis Plakentias towards Dimotiko Theatro	Line 3	Paiania–Kantza towards Athens Airport
Location

Pallini (Greek: Παλλήνη) is a station located in the median strip of the Attiki Odos motorway west of the suburb of Pallini, East Attica. This station first opened to Athens Suburban Railway trains on 30 July 2004, with Athens Metro services calling at this station from September 2006.

The station's platforms have two levels, with each end serving trains from either the Athens Metro or the Suburban Railway: Suburban Railway trains stop at the northern end while Athens Metro Line 3 trains stop at the southern end. As of November 2022, the station is served by two Suburban Railway trains per hour to the airport, one or two to Ano Liosia and one to Piraeus.

== History ==
The station opened 30 July 2004.

The station is owned by GAIAOSE, which since 3 October 2001 owns most railway stations in Greece: the company was also in charge of rolling stock from December 2014 until October 2025, when Greek Railways (the owner of the Airport–Patras railway) took over that responsibility.

== Services ==
Since 22 November 2025, the following services call at this station:

- Athens Suburban Railway Line A1 between Piraeus (via Metamorfosi) and Athens Airport, with up to one train per hour;
- Athens Suburban Railway Line A2 between Ano Liosia and Athens Airport, with up to two trains per hour on weekdays, and up to one train per hour on weekends and public holidays;
- Athens Metro Line 3 between Dimotiko Theatro (via Syntagma) and Athens Airport, with up to one train every 36 minutes.

== Station layout ==
P Platforms	Platform 2	← to Piraeus / to Ano Liosia / to Dimotiko Theatro (Doukissis Plakentias)
P Platforms	Island platform, doors will open on the left
P Platforms	Platform 1	→ to Athens Airport (Paiania–Kantza) →
