= Koropi station =

Athens Suburban Railway and Athens Metro station

Κορωπί Koropi
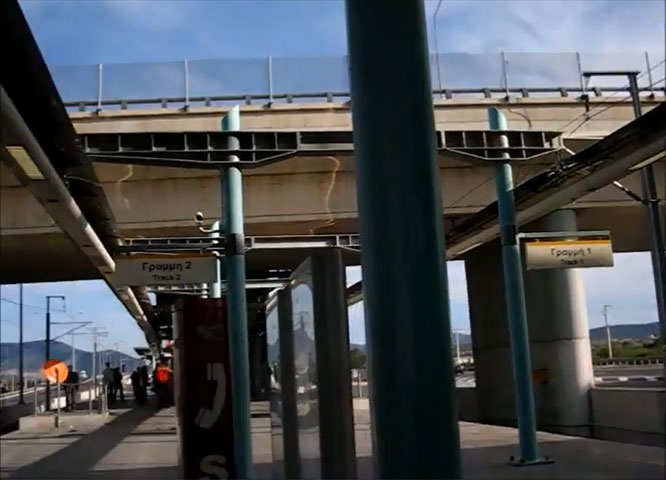
- Suburban Railway platforms

General information
- Location: 194 00 Koropi; Greece
- Coordinates: 37°54′46″N 23°53′45″E
- Owner: GAIAOSE
- Line: Airport–Patras railway
- Platforms: 2
- Tracks: 2
- Train operators: Hellenic Train (Suburban Rail); STASY (Metro)

Construction
- Structure type: At-grade
- Accessible: Yes

Key dates
- 30 July 2004: Opened
- 10 July 2006: Rebuilt for Metro trains
- 4 June 2007: Suburban Rail electrified

Services
| Preceding station | Suburban Rail | Following station |
|---|---|---|
| Paiania–Kantza towards Piraeus | Line A1 | Athens Airport Terminus |
| Paiania–Kantza towards Ano Liosia | Line A2 | Athens Airport Terminus |
| Preceding station | Athens Metro | Following station |
| Paiania–Kantza towards Dimotiko Theatro | Line 3 | Athens Airport Terminus |
Location

Koropi (Greek: Κορωπί) is an Athens Metro and Suburban Railway station situated at east of the town of Koropi, East Attica in Athens metropolitan area. located in the median strip of the Attiki Odos motorway. It opened to Athens Suburban Railway trains on 30 July 2004, with Athens Metro services calling at this station from 10 July 2006.

The station's platforms have two levels, with each end serving trains from the Athens Metro or the Suburban Railway: Suburban Railway trains stop at the northern end. In contrast, Athens Metro Line 3 trains stop at the southern end. As of 2022 the station is served by two Suburban Railway and two Metro trains per hour to the airport, one Suburban Railway train to Ano Liosia and one to Pireaus, and one or two Metro trains to Nikaia.

== History ==
The station opened to Athens Suburban Railway trains on 30 July 2004, two weeks before the 2004 Olympic Games. This first section was not electrified and instead operated DMU'S every half hour. with Athens Metro services calling at this station from 10 July 2006. In 2008, all Athens Suburban Railway services were transferred from OSE to TrainOSE. In 2009, with the Greek debt crisis unfolding OSE's Management was forced to reduce services across the network. Timetables were cutback and routes closed, as the government-run entity attempted to reduce overheads. In 2017 OSE's passenger transport sector was privatised as TrainOSE, currently, a wholly owned subsidiary of Ferrovie dello Stato Italiane rail infrastructure, remained under the control of OSE and station infrastructure under Gaiose. In July 2022, the station began being served by Hellenic Train, the rebranded TranOSE.

The station is owned by GAIAOSE, which since 3 October 2001 owns most railway stations in Greece: the company was also in charge of rolling stock from December 2014 until October 2025, when Greek Railways (the owner of the Airport–Patras railway) took over that responsibility.

== Facilities ==
The station building is located above an island platform, with access to the platform-level lifts and escalators. The Station buildings are also equipped with a staffed ticket office with gate access. At platform level, there is sheltered seating, with Dot-matrix display departure and arrival screens or timetable poster boards on both platforms. There is a small car park on-site. Outside the station, there is a bus stop where the local 120 308 309 and 330 call.

== Services ==
Since 22 November 2025, the following services call at this station:

- Athens Suburban Railway Line A1 between Piraeus (via Metamorfosi) and Athens Airport, with up to one train per hour;
- Athens Suburban Railway Line A2 between Ano Liosia and Athens Airport, with up to two trains per hour on weekdays, and up to one train per hour on weekends and public holidays;
- Athens Metro Line 3 between Dimotiko Theatro (via Syntagma) and Athens Airport, with up to one train every 36 minutes.

== Station layout ==
| P Platforms | Platform 2 | ← to Piraeus / to Ano Liosia / to Dimotiko Theatro (Paiania–Kantza) |
| P Platforms | Island platform, doors will open on the left |
| P Platforms | Platform 1 | → to Athens Airport (Terminus) → |

== Future ==
Koropi is expected to become a junction station with the opening of a 32 km branch line to Lavrio.
