= Athens Airport–Patras railway =

Railway line in Greece

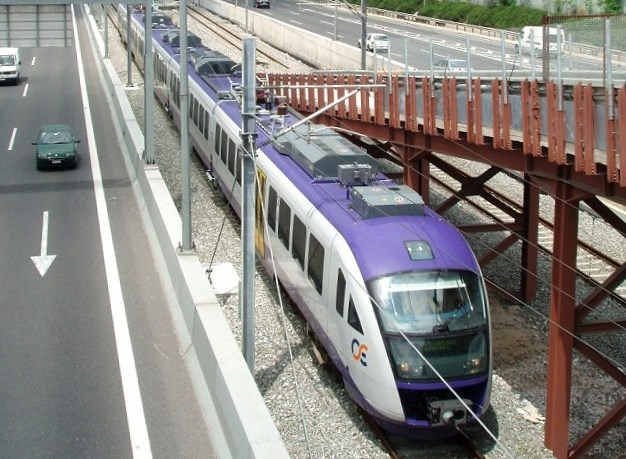
- An OSE class 460 train in the median strip of Attiki Odos, bound for Athens Airport.

Overview
- Status: Operational
- Owner: Hellenic Railways Organisation
- Locale: Attica; Peloponnese; Western Greece
- Termini: Athens Airport 37.9369°N 23.9448°E; Aigio 38.2400°N 22.1035°E
- Stations: 32

Service
- Type: High-speed rail/Commuter rail
- Operator(s): Hellenic Train

History
- Opened: 2004 (Athens Airport–SKA); 2005 (SKA–Corinth); 2007 (Corinth–Kiato); 2020 (Kiato–Aigio)

Technical
- Line length: 205.85 km (127.91 mi) (almost 235 km (146 mi) up to Patras)
- Number of tracks: Double track
- Character: Primary
- Track gauge: 1,435 mm (4 ft 8 1/2 in) standard gauge
- Electrification: 25 kV 50 Hz AC (between Athens Airport and Kiato)
- Operating speed: 160 km/h (99 mph) (average); 200 km/h (124 mph) (maximum)

The railway from Athens Airport to Patras is a double-track, standard-gauge railway line in Greece that, when completed, will connect Athens International Airport with Patras, the country's third-largest city. One of the largest railway projects of the last 30 years in Greece, its completion is of major significance for the infrastructure of the entire region of the northern Peloponnese. As of 2020, the line is completed until the city of Aigio. A 5.2 km underground section is planned for the final section from Kastellokampos to Agios Andreas in Patras, terminating at the new port of Patras. For most of the section between Athens Airport in East Attica and Mandra in West Attica, the line runs along the median strip of the Attiki Odos motorway.

== Course ==
Athens Airport - Patras railway line
| Main parts of the line (2020) | line length (km) | Number of stations | Stations names | Electrification (as of 2020) |
|---|---|---|---|---|
| Athens Airport–Acharnes Railway Center | 30 | 11 | Athens Airport, Koropi, Paiania-Kantza, Pallini, Doukissis Plakentias, Pentelis, Kifisias, Nerantziotissa, Irakleio, Metamorfosi, Acharnes Railway Center | yes |
| Acharnes Railway Center–Kiato | 105 | 11 | Zefyri, Ano Liosia, Aspropyrgos, Magoula, Nea Peramos, Megara, Kineta, Agioi Theodoroi, Corinth, Zevgolatio, Kiato | yes |
| Kiato–Aigio | 71 | 10 | Diminio, Xylokastro, Lykoporia, Lygia, Akrata, Platanos, Diakopto, Eliki, Aigio | Postponed to 2026 |
| Aigio–Psathopyrgos | 21.5 | 5 | Rododafni, Selianitika, Kamares, Psathopyrgos | Postponed to 2026 (rails, stations, signaling and electrification) |
| Psathopyrgos–Rio | 10.5 | 5 | Arachovitika, Agios Vasileios, Aktaion, Rio (November 2025 & 15,5% works: May 2024) | Postponed to 2028 (rails, stations, signaling and electrification) |
| Rio–Patras New Port | 8.5 (5.2 underground) | 9 | Kastelokampos, Bozaïtika, P.Kanellopoulos str., Agia, Panachaïki, Agios Dionysios, Trion Simmachon (Patras), Agios Andreas, Patras New Port (Stations 1-8 underground) | Waiting for a project definition, the agreement with local authorities and the funding are missing |

== Main stations ==
The main stations on the Athens Airport–Patras railway are:

- Athens Airport Station
- Acharnes Railway Center (Interchange with the Athens-Thessaloniki Railway)
- Ano Liosia railway station
- Corinth railway station
- Kiato railway station
- Diakopto railway station (Interchange with the Diakopto-Kalavryta rack railway)
- Aigio railway station

== Services ==
As of June 2020, the Athens Airport–Patras railway is used by the following passenger services, all part of the Athens Suburban Railway (Proastiakos) network:

- Line 1: Piraeus–Athens–Airport (also uses the Athens-Thessaloniki Railway)
- Line 2: Piraeus–Athens–Kiato (also uses the Athens-Thessaloniki Railway)
- Line 4: Ano Liosia–Koropi–Airport
- Line 5: Aigio–Kiato–Athens/Airport

== Future ==
As part of the P.A.Th.E./P. project, the line is being extended to Patras. The remaining part from Rio to Patras will be partly underground with a terminus in the new harbour. The existing train station of Patras will get a new function in a new recreational space. The electrification of the Kiato–Aigio section will allow direct services to and from Athens, as passengers must currently change between electric and diesel trains at Kiato. On the south-eastern side, the line will be prolonged up to Lavrio and Rafina. A tender note has been published by ERGOSE SA, with Jan 14th 2022 deadline.

== Gallery ==
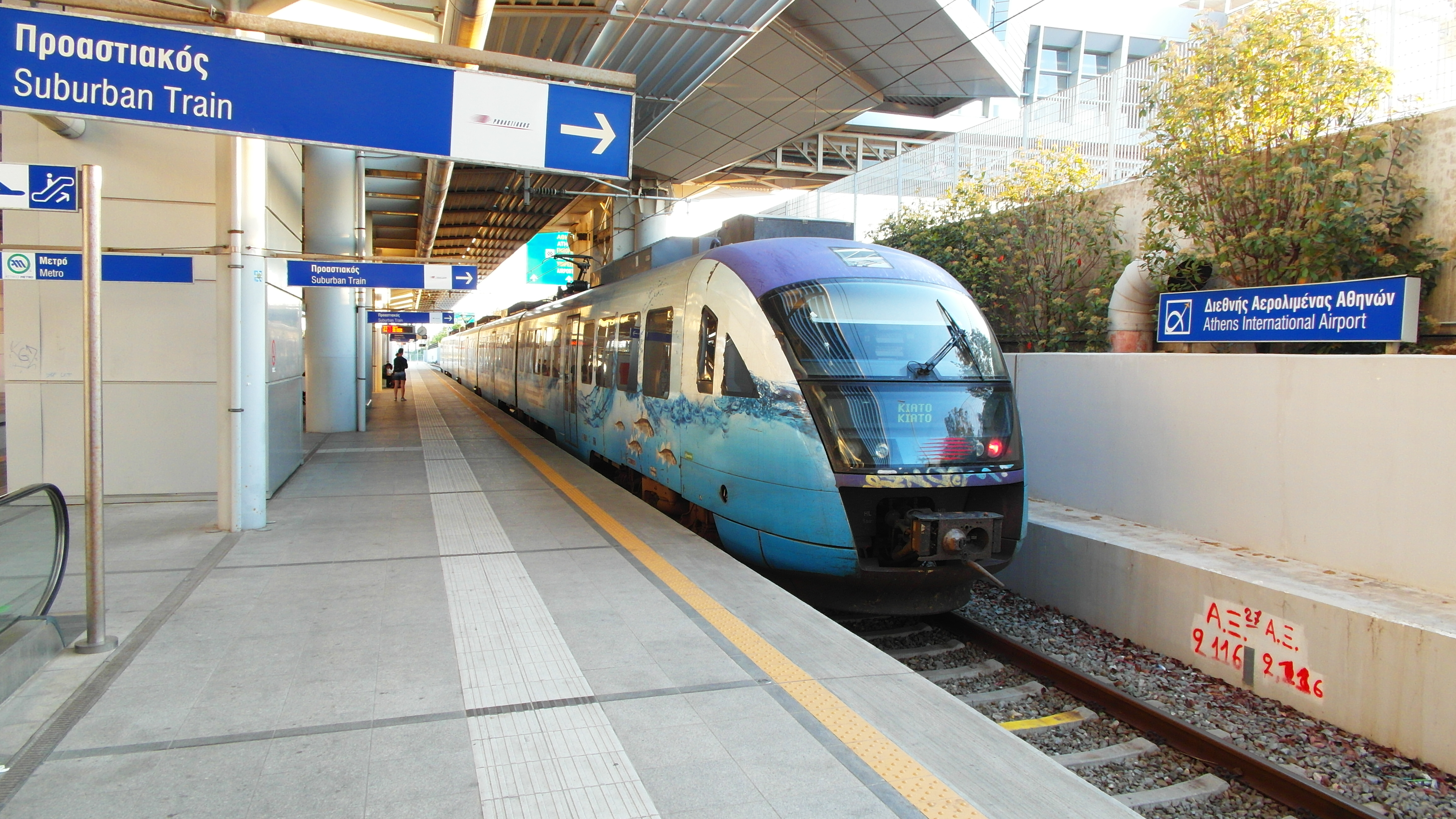
Athens Airport Station (2015)

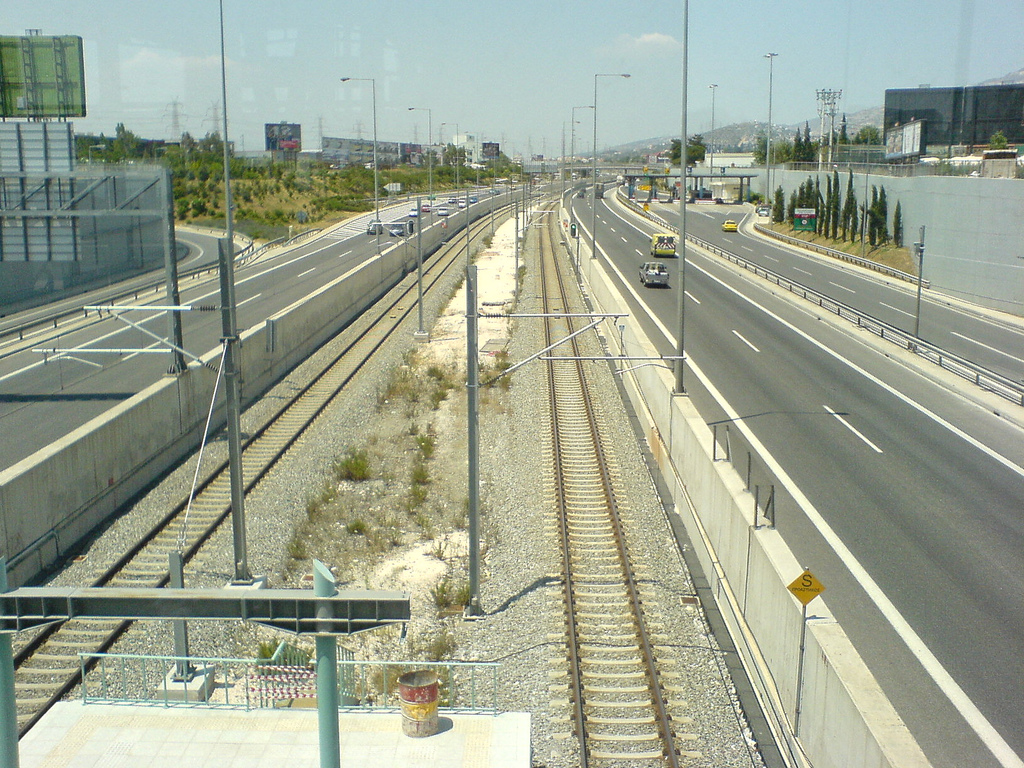
View from Pallini station (2008)

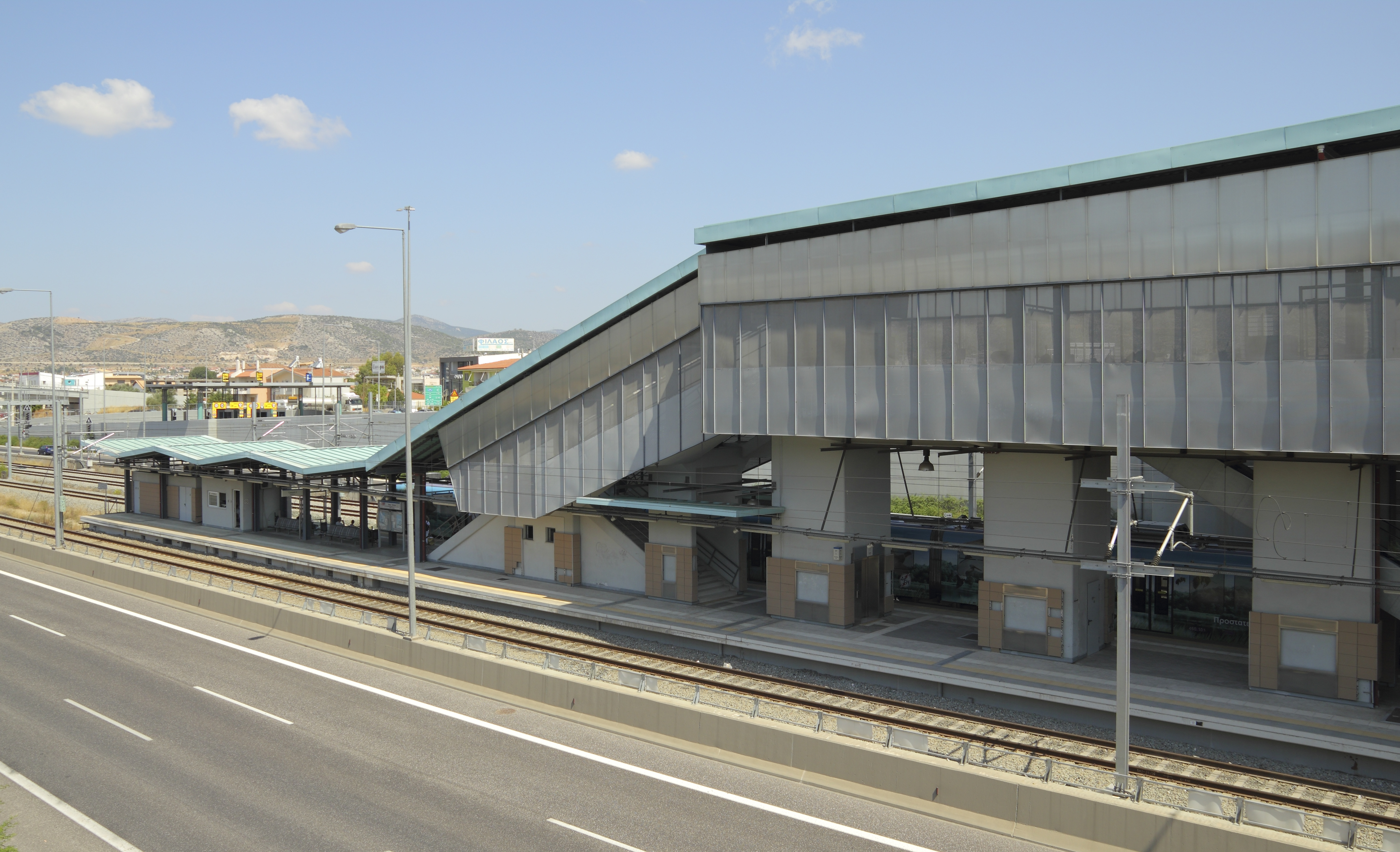
Ano Liosia railway station (2013)

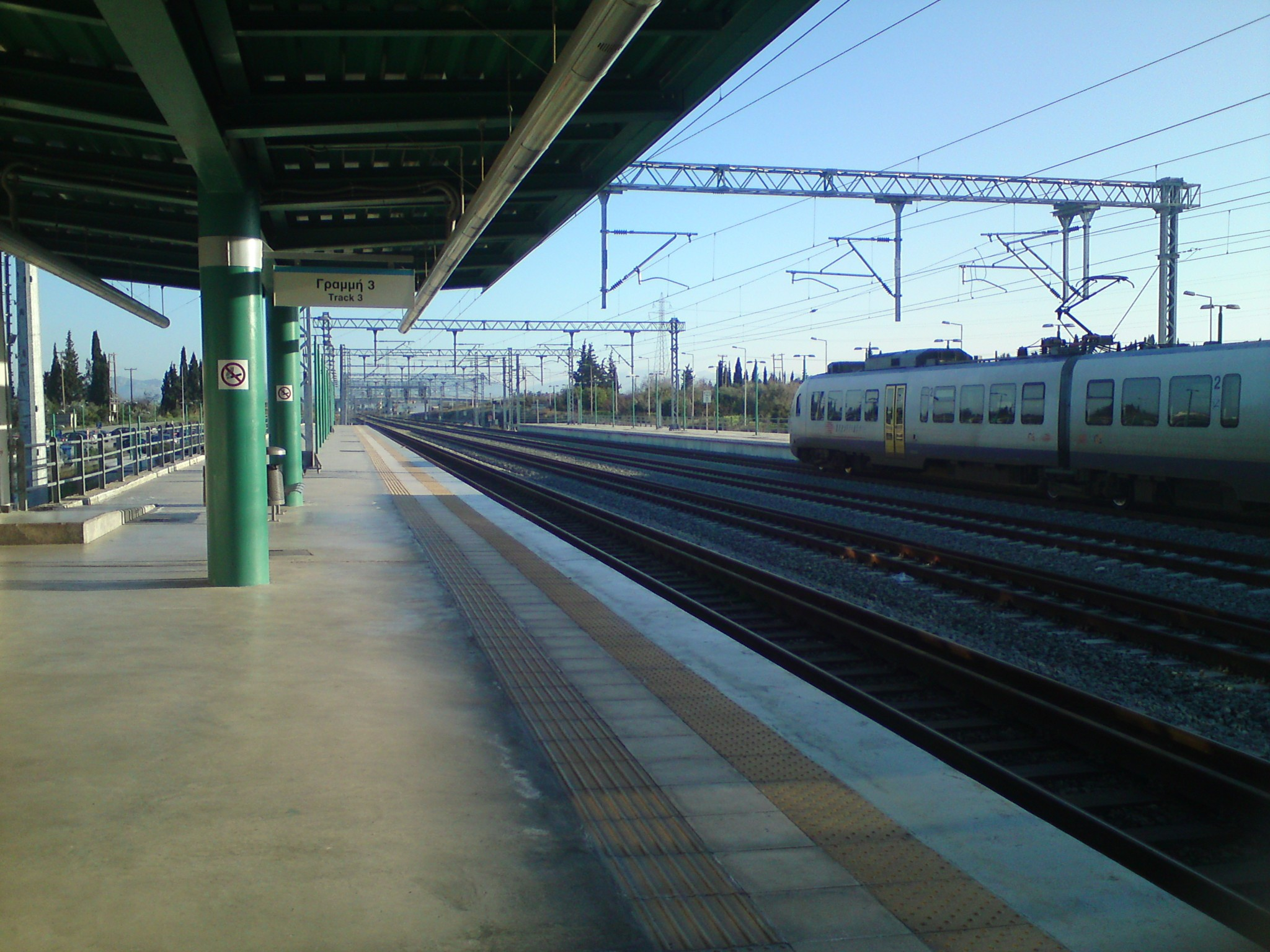
Kiato railway station (2011)

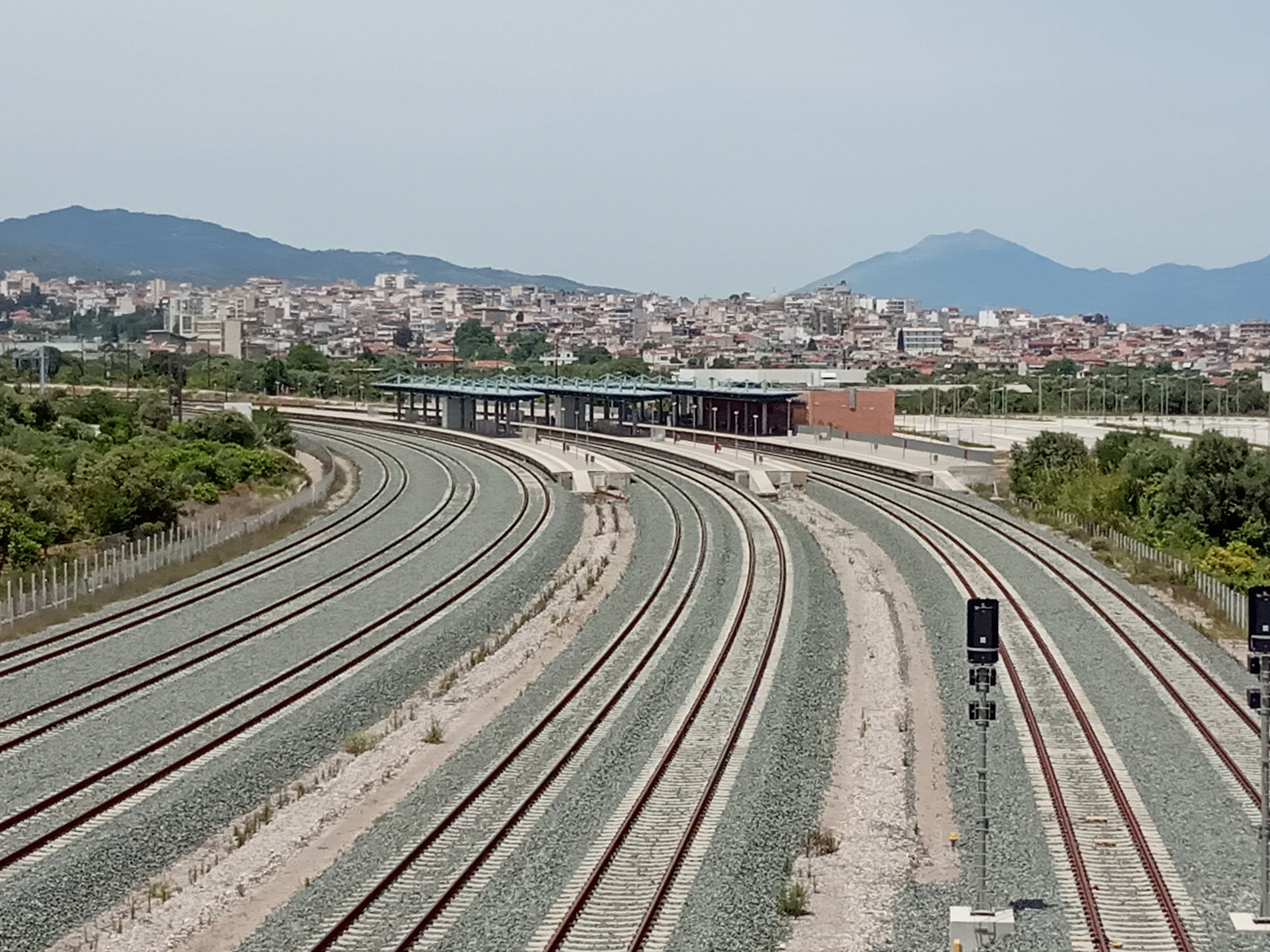
Aigio railway station (2019)
