= Corinth railway station =

Railway station in Corinth, Greece

Κόρινθος Korinthos
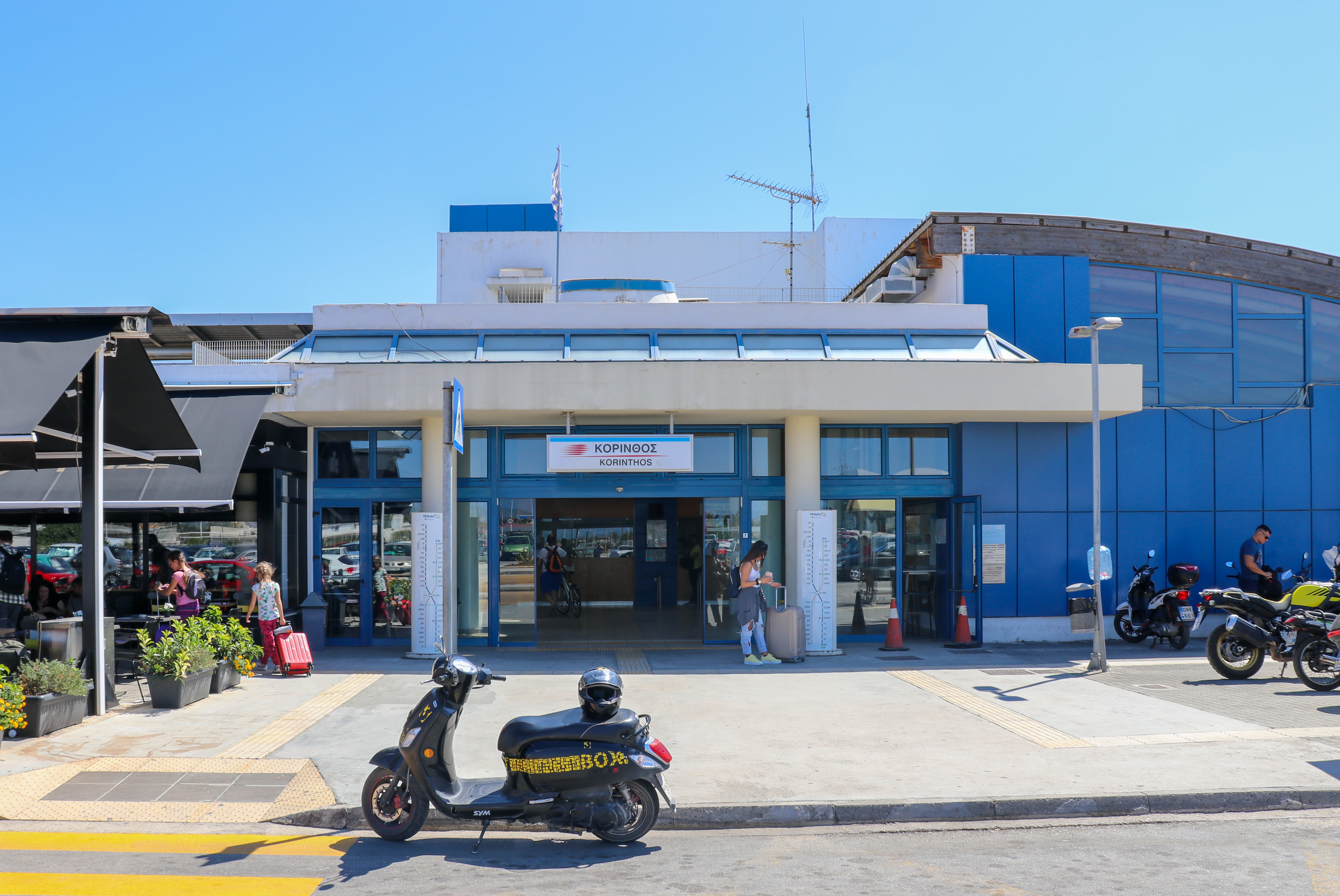
- Corinth railway station forecourt, August 2019

General information
- Location: 20100, Corinth; Corinthia; Greece
- Coordinates: 37°55′16″N 22°55′57″E
- Owner: GAIAOSE
- Operator: Hellenic Train
- Lines: Airport–Patras railway; Corinth–Kalamata railway
- Platforms: 7 (2 in regular use)
- Tracks: 8

Construction
- Structure type: at-grade
- Platform levels: 2
- Parking: Yes
- Cycle facilities: Yes
- Accessible: Yes

Other information
- Status: Staffed

Key dates
- 27 September 2005: Opened
- 12 December 2010: Electrified

Services
Preceding station	Suburban Rail	Following station
Zevgolatio towards Kiato	Line A4	Agioi Theodoroi towards Piraeus
Location

Corinth railway station (Greek: Σιδηροδρομικός Σταθμός Κορίνθου, romanized: Sidirodromikós Stathmós Korínthou) is a station in Corinth in the northern Peloponnese, Greece. It was opened on 27 September 2005, replacing an older station near the harbour. The new station is located 2.9 kilometres (1.8 mi) from the town centre on the outskirts of the city, near Examilia near the A8 motorway between Athens and Patras. The station is served by the Athens Suburban Railway between Piraeus and Kiato. It should not be confused with the now-closed station Corinth railway station, which is located northeast of the current station, closer to the coast of the Corinthian Gulf.

== History ==
The new station lies on the Athens Airport–Patras railway and was opened as the line's western terminus on 27 September 2005. It remained so until 9 July 2007, when the line was extended to Kiato. The new station should not be confused with the old Corinth station on the Piraeus-Patras line of the former SPAP, which is located north of the current station (inside the city of Corinth), which closed in 2007. The station is served by Line 2 of the Athens Suburban Railway between Piraeus and Kiato. The two stations are still connected by a metric line, which is a small branch of the Corinth-Kalamata railway line and which operated to promote passengers between the Peloponnese and Attica between 2005 and 2007, which is now disused. In 2009, with the Greek debt crisis unfolding OSE's Management was forced to reduce services across the network. Timetables were cutback and routes closed, as the government-run entity attempted to reduce overheads. In 2017 OSE's passenger transport sector was privatised as TrainOSE, currently a wholly owned subsidiary of Ferrovie dello Stato Italiane infrastructure, including stations, remained under the control of OSE. In July 2022, the station began being served by Hellenic Train, the rebranded TranOSE.

The station is owned by GAIAOSE, which since 3 October 2001 owns most railway stations in Greece: the company was also in charge of rolling stock from December 2014 until October 2025, when Greek Railways (the owner of the Airport–Patras railway) took over that responsibility.

== Facilities ==
The raised station is assessed via stairs or a ramp. It has three island platform 1 side platform (however but only two platforms presently in use), with station buildings located on platform 1, with access to the platform level via stairs or lift from a subway. In the subway to the platforms, copies of ancient artefacts excavated during the station's construction are on display. The Station buildings are equipped with a booking office, toilets & a cafe located at the entrance to the station. At platform level, there are sheltered seating, an air-conditioned indoor passenger shelter and Dot-matrix display departure and arrival screens and timetable poster boards on both platforms. There is a large car park on-site, adjacent to the eastbound line. Currently, there is a local bus stop connecting the station, a large, free car park, and a taxi rank, all located at the station forecourt.

== Services ==
Since 22 November 2025, the following services call at this station:

- Athens Suburban Railway Line A4 between Piraeus and Kiato, with up to one train per hour.

== Station layout ==
G
- Street level
- Concourse
- Customer service
- Tickets
- Exits
L1
Side platform, doors open on the right
Platform 8
Abandoned track (metre gauge)
Island platform, doors open on the left/right
Platform 7
Not in regular use (dual gauge)
Island platform, doors open on the left/right
Platform 6
← to Kiato (Zevgolatio, standard gauge)
Platform 5
to Piraeus (Agioi Theodoroi, standard gauge) →
Island platform, doors open on the left/right
Platform 4
Not in regular use (standard gauge)
Through lines
Sidings 1–3 (standard gauge)

== Future ==
The reopening of the metric line from Loutraki to Nafplio sections is currently being examined, especially for the tourist needs of the area. The new Italian management of TRAINOSE has expressed its interest in the operation of the department.
