= Kiato railway station =

Railway station in Corinthia, Greece

Κιάτο Kiato
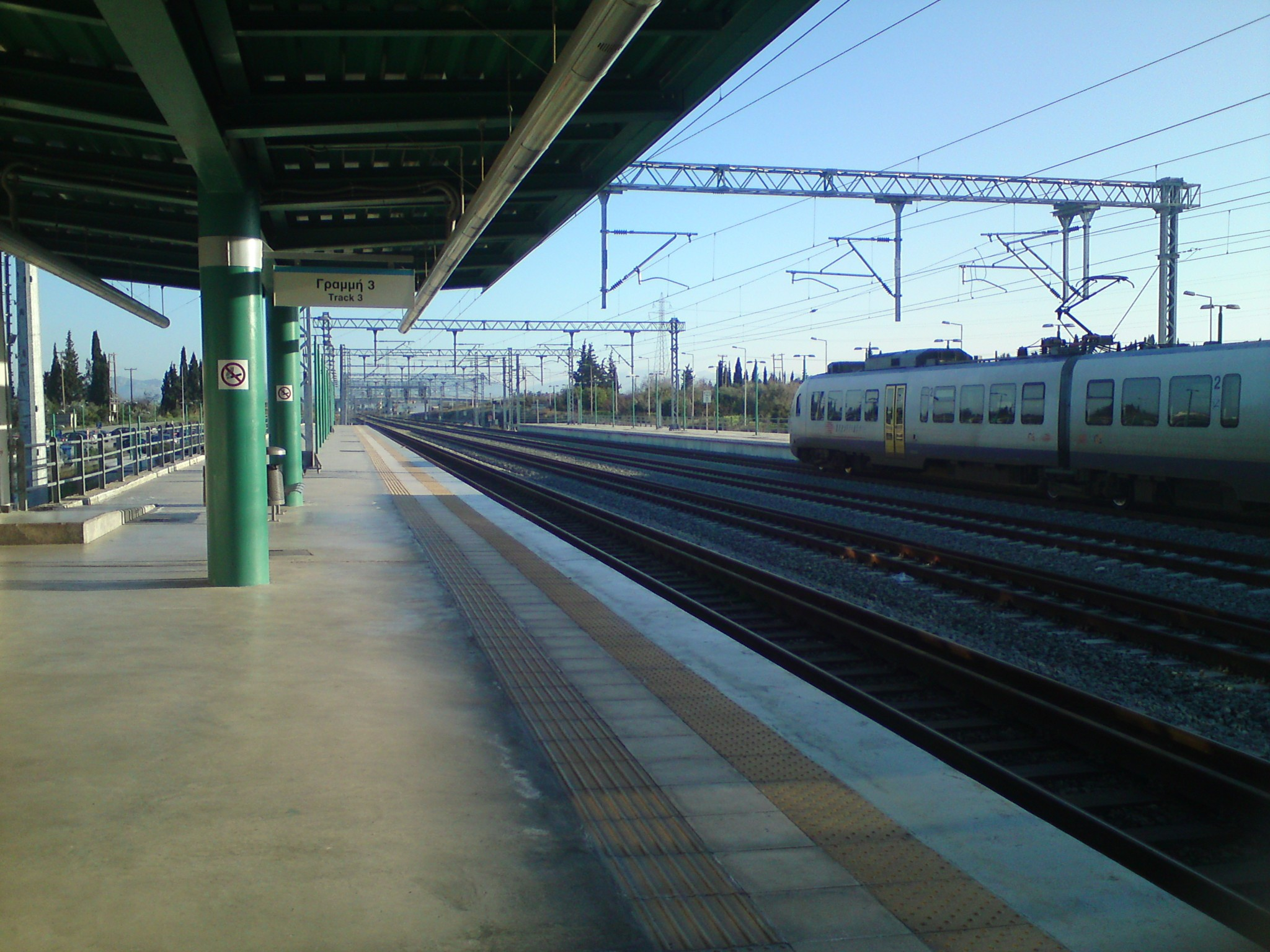
- Platform 3 at Kiato railway station with a Siemens Desiro (OSE class 660) about to depart for Zevgolatio, February 2011

General information
- Location: Kiato; Corinthia; Greece
- Coordinates: 38.013950°N 22.734685°E
- Owner: GAIAOSE
- Operator: Hellenic Train
- Line: Airport–Patras railway
- Platforms: 3
- Tracks: 5
- Connections: Bus (to Patras)

Construction
- Structure type: At Grade
- Platform levels: 1
- Parking: Yes
- Cycle facilities: Yes
- Accessible: Yes

Other information
- Status: (Unknown)

Key dates
- 9 July 2007: Opened
- 12 December 2010: Electrified

Services
Preceding station	Hellenic Train	Following station
Diminio towards Aigio	G7 Kiato-Aigio	Terminus
Preceding station	Suburban Rail	Following station
Terminus	Line A4	Zevgolatio towards Piraeus
Location

Kiato railway station (Greek: Σιδηροδρομικός Σταθμός Κιάτου, romanized: Sidirodromikós Stathmós Kiátou) is a railway station in Kiato, a town in the northern Peloponnese, Greece. The station is located 1 km west of the town, near the A8 motorway between Athens and Patras. It was opened on 9 July 2007. The station is served by the Athens Suburban Railway towards Piraeus and Hellenic Train local services to Aigio. It should not be confused with the now-closed station on the old Piraeus–Patras railway, which is located northeast of the current station, closer to the coast of the Corinthian Gulf.

== History ==
It opened on 9 July 2007 as the western terminus of the new standard-gauge line from Athens Airport. In 2009, with the Greek debt crisis unfolding OSE's Management was forced to reduce services across the network. Timetables were cutback and routes closed, as the government-run entity attempted to reduce overheads. Initially, Kiato railway station served as an exchange point for passengers to Patras on the old metre-gauge line from Piraeus, but all regional services on the metre-gauge lines of the Peloponnese were suspended indefinitely in December 2010 for cost reasons. The old Kiato–Sikyona railway station nearby was also closed. In 2017 OSE's passenger transport sector was privatised as TrainOSE, currently a wholly owned subsidiary of Ferrovie dello Stato Italiane infrastructure, including stations, remained under the control of OSE. In July 2022, the station began being served by Hellenic Train, the rebranded TranOSE.

The station is owned by GAIAOSE, which since 3 October 2001 owns most railway stations in Greece: the company was also in charge of rolling stock from December 2014 until October 2025, when Greek Railways (the owner of the Airport–Patras railway) took over that responsibility.

== Facilities ==
The raised station is assessed via stairs or a ramp. It has one side platform and one island platform, with station buildings located on platform 1, with access to the platform level via stairs or lifts. The Station buildings are equipped with a booking office, and toilets. At platform level, there are sheltered seating, an air-conditioned indoor passenger shelter (as of 2020 not open) and Dot-matrix display departure and arrival screens (inoperable as of 2019) and timetable poster boards on both platforms. This is a small shop and a café on the ground level, just next to the entrance overlooking the carpark. There is a large car park on-site, adjacent to the eastbound line. As of 2025, there is no local bus stop connecting the station.

== Services ==
Since 22 November 2025, the following services call at this station:

- Athens Suburban Railway Line A4 towards Piraeus, with up to one train per hour;
- Hellenic Train local service towards Aigio, with six trains per day, from 05:24 to 20:10.

Pending the electrification of the Kiato–Aigio section, passengers must change between electric and diesel trains at Kiato. Those travelling to and from the airport should change trains at Ano Liosia, as there is currently no direct service. Pending the completion of the Athens Airport–Patras railway, passengers travelling to and from Patras may use Hellenic Train's rail replacement bus services (ten per-day, as of 2025), which connect the city with Kiato and Diakopto stations. Diakopto is also the terminus of the unique rack railway to Kalavryta.

== Station layout ==
L Ground/Concourse	Customer service	Tickets/Exits
Level; Ε1	Side platform, doors on the right
Level; Ε1	Track 1	← to Piraeus (Zevgolatio) (Terminal & Departure platform)
Level; Ε1	Through lines	In non-regular use
Level; Ε1	Through lines	In non-regular use
Level; Ε1	Track 3	Hellenic Train to Aigio (Diminio) (Terminal & Departure platform) →
Level; Ε1	Side platform, doors on the right

== Gallery ==
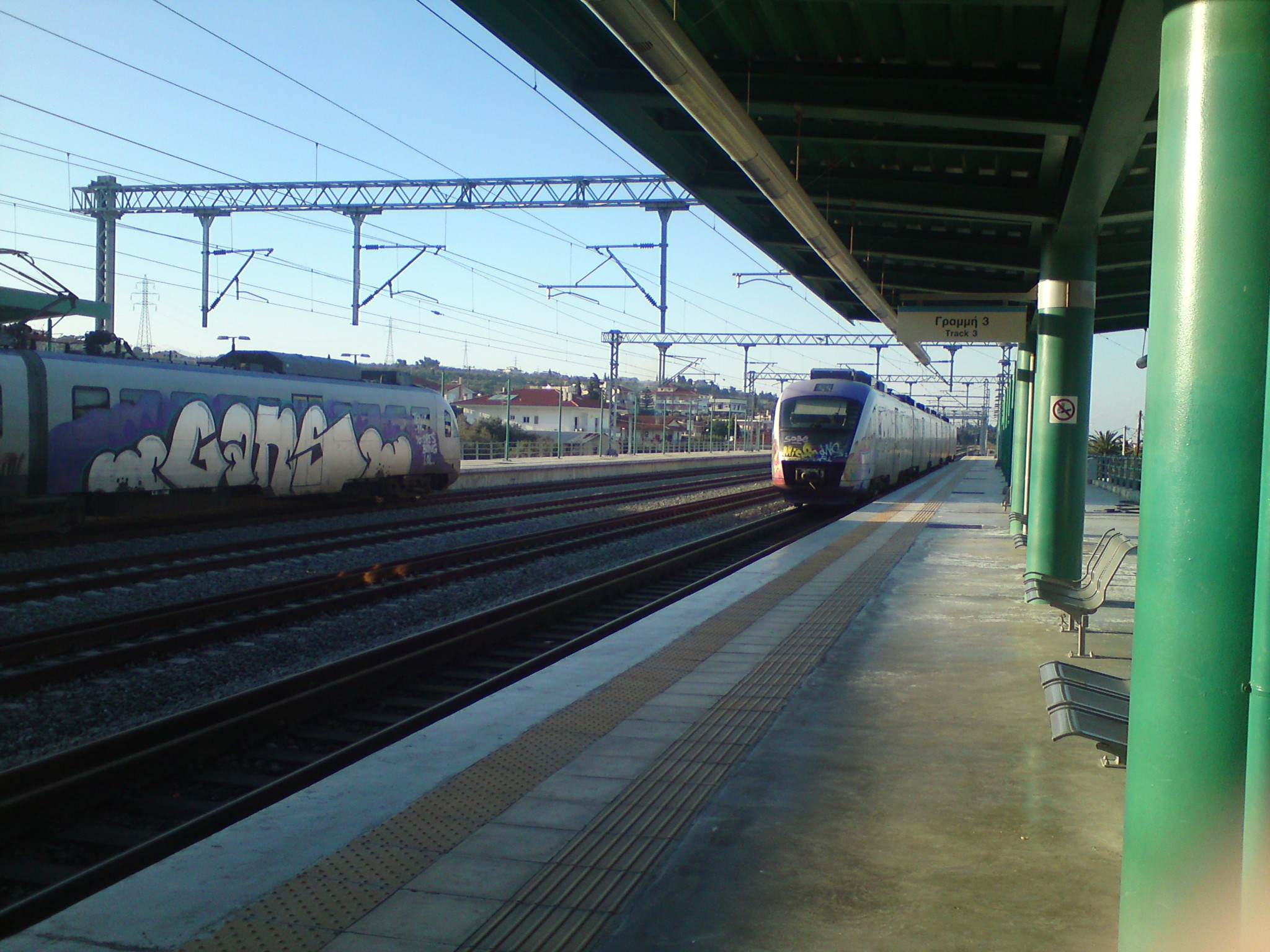
A pair of Siemens Desiro (OSE class 460) trains at Kiato station.

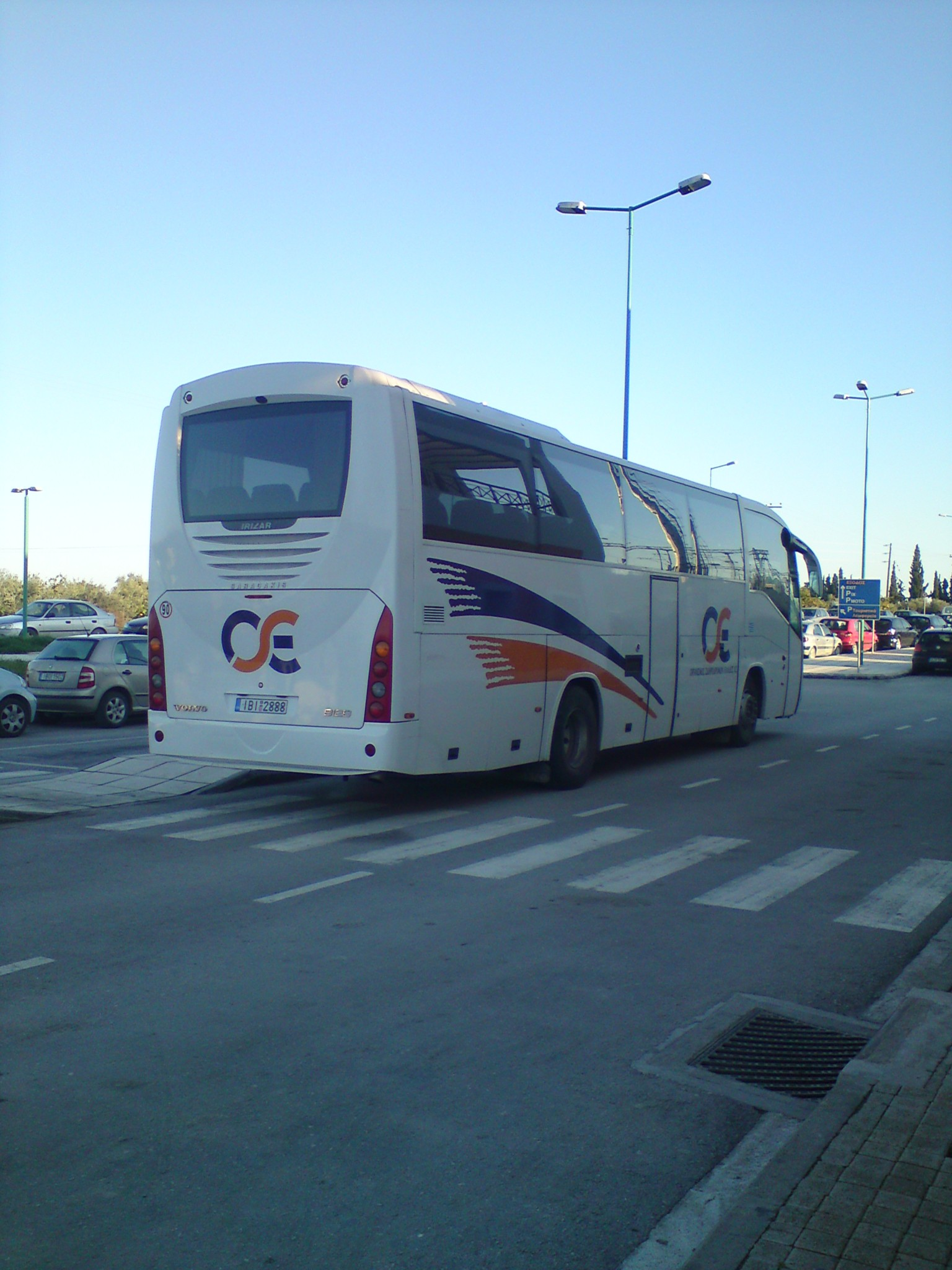
Replacement bus service for the suspended rail connection to Patras.

At Kiato station, the works in the first track of the station are about to begin. The project has consisted of various steps, and the final goal is the downgrade of the track, as in 2007, it was higher than the others so that the meter gauge trains could fit onto the platform. Now, as they're no more meter gauge trains there and the new line to Diakopto has almost been completed, the station must be ready. The works will start with the removal of the ballast and the track in order to dig the ground for the downgrading. The K2 is the ballast cleaner of Hellenic Railways and is the oldest maintenance rail machine that is still in use in the country. It was transferred on Sunday, 25 September, from A.I.Rentis depot to Kiato station, via Athens and the new line, hauled by MLW MX627 A 456 and A 458. This is a rare transfer not only because of the ballast cleaner but also for these MX627 locomotives that entered the line to Kiato.

== See also ==
- Athens railway station
- Corinth railway station
- Aigio railway station
- Hellenic Railways Organization
- TrainOSE
- Proastiakos
- P.A.Th.E./P.
