= Arnissa railway station =

Greek railway station

Άρνισσα Arnissa
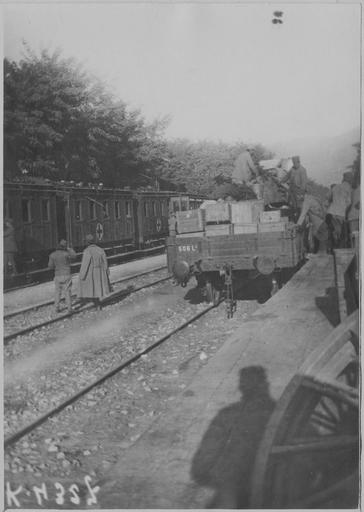
- Ostrovon railway station, with troops deployments, 27 September 1916

General information
- Location: 580 02, Pella; Greece
- Coordinates: 40°47′53″N 21°50′06″E
- Elevation: 82.00 metres (269.03 ft)
- Owner: GAIAOSE
- Operator: Hellenic Train
- Line: Thessaloniki–Bitola railway
- Distance: 129 kilometres (80 mi) from Thessaloniki
- Platforms: 3 (1 disused)
- Tracks: 3 (1 disused)

Construction
- Structure type: at-grade
- Platform levels: 1
- Parking: No
- Cycle facilities: No

Other information
- Status: Unstaffed
- Website: http://www.ose.gr/en/

History
- Opened: 1894
- Former names: Ostrovon (before 1926)
- Original company: Société du Chemin de Fer ottoman Salonique-Monastir

Services
Preceding station	Regional Rail	Following station
Agios Panteleimonas towards Florina	Line T2	Agras towards Thessaloniki
Location
- Location within Greece

Arnissa railway station (Greek: Σιδηροδρομικός σταθμός Άρνισσα, romanized: Sidirodromikós stathmós Arnissa) is the railway station of Arnissa in West Macedonia, Greece. The station is located within the center of the settlement, on the Thessaloniki–Bitola railway, 129 kilometres (80 mi) from Thessaloniki, and is served by the Thessaloniki Regional Railway (formerly the Suburban Railway).

== History ==
Opened in June 1894 as Ostrovon railway station (Greek: Σιδηροδρομικός σταθμός Όστροβον, romanized: Sidirodromikós stathmós Ostrovon) in what was then the Ottoman Empire at the completion of the Société du Chemin de Fer ottoman Salonique-Monastir, a branchline of the Chemins de fer Orientaux from Thessaloniki to Bitola. During this period, Northern Greece and the southern Balkans were still under Ottoman rule, and Skydras was known as Vertekop. Skydra was annexed by Greece on 18 October 1912 during the First Balkan War. During 1913, the Macedonian fighter Georgios Dikonymos-Makris served as the stationmaster, who, in the same year, contributed to the extermination of the important comitatist Vasil Tsekalarov.

On 17 October 1925, The Greek government purchased the Greek sections of the former Salonica Monastir railway, and the railway became part of the Hellenic State Railways, with the remaining section north of Florina seeded to Yugoslavia. In 1926 the station, along with the settlement, was renamed Arnissa. In 1970, OSE became the legal successor to the SEK, taking over responsibilities for most of Greece's rail infrastructure. On 1 January 1971, the station and most of Greek rail infrastructure were transferred to the Hellenic Railways Organisation S.A., a state-owned corporation. Freight traffic declined sharply when the state-imposed monopoly of OSE for the transport of agricultural products and fertilisers ended in the early 1990s. Many small stations of the network with little passenger traffic were closed.

In 2001 the infrastructure element of OSE was created, known as GAIAOSE; it would henceforth be responsible for the maintenance of stations, bridges and other elements of the network, as well as the leasing and the sale of railway assists. In 2003, OSE launched "Proastiakos SA", as a subsidiary to serve the operation of the suburban network in the urban complex of Athens during the 2004 Olympic Games. In 2005, TrainOSE was created as a brand within OSE to concentrate on rail services and passenger interface.

Since 2007, the station is served by the Thessaloniki Regional Railway. In 2008, all Proastiakos were transferred from OSE to TrainOSE. In 2009, with the Greek debt crisis unfolding OSE's Management was forced to reduce services across the network. Timetables were cut back, and routes closed as the government-run entity attempted to reduce overheads. In August 2013, Regional Railway services were extended to Florina. In 2017 OSE's passenger transport sector was privatised as TrainOSE, currently a wholly owned subsidiary of Ferrovie dello Stato Italiane infrastructure, including stations, remained under the control of OSE. In July 2022, the station began being served by Hellenic Train, the rebranded TranOSE.

The station is owned by GAIAOSE, which since 3 October 2001 owns most railway stations in Greece: the company was also in charge of rolling stock from December 2014 until October 2025, when Greek Railways (the owner of the Thessaloniki–Bitola railway) took over that responsibility.

== Facilities ==
The station is still housed in the original 19th-century brick-built station building; however, as of (2023) the station is unstaffed, with no staffed booking office. However, there are waiting rooms. The platforms have no shelters or seating, but seating is located under the canopy, as well as a public payphone. There are no Dot-matrix display departure and arrival screens or timetable poster boards on the platforms. Parking is located next to the forecourt, as well as a taxi pickup point.

== Services ==
As of September 2026, Line T2 of the Thessaloniki Regional Railway calls at this station: service is currently limited compared to October 2012, with two trains per day to Thessaloniki, and two trains per day to Florina.

There are currently no services to Bitola in North Macedonia, because the international connection from Mesonisi to Neos Kafkasos is currently disused.

== Station layout ==
L Ground/Concourse	Customer service	Tickets/Exits
Level; Ε1
Level; Ε1	Side platform, doors on the right
Level; Ε1	Platform 1	towards Thessaloniki (Edessa) ←
Level; Ε1	Island platform, doors on the right
Level; Ε1	Platform 2	towards Florina (Agios) →
Level; Ε1	Island platform, doors on the right
Level; Ε1	Platform 3	→ Non-regular use

== See also ==
- Railway stations in Greece
- Hellenic Railways Organization
- Hellenic Train
- Proastiakos
