= Agios Panteleimonas railway station =

Greek railway station

Άγιος Παντελεήμονας Agios Panteleimonas

General information
- Location: 532 00, Amyntaio; Florina; Greece
- Coordinates: 40°43′37″N 21°44′45″E
- Elevation: 580 metres (1,900 ft)
- Owner: GAIAOSE
- Operator: Hellenic Train
- Line: Thessaloniki–Bitola railway
- Distance: 152.2 kilometres (94.6 mi) from Thessaloniki
- Platforms: 1
- Tracks: 1

Construction
- Structure type: at-grade
- Platform levels: 1
- Parking: No
- Cycle facilities: No

Other information
- Status: Unstaffed
- Website: http://www.ose.gr/en/

History
- Opened: 1894
- Former names: (before 1926) Pateli
- Original company: Chemins de fer Orientaux

Services
Preceding station	Regional Rail	Following station
Amyntaio towards Florina	Line T2	Arnissa towards Thessaloniki
Location
- Location within Greece

Agios Panteleimonas railway station (Greek: Άγιος Παντελεήμονας) is a railway halt in Agios Panteleimonas, a village in West Macedonia, Greece. The station is located about 300 metres (330 yd) north from the center of the settlement, on the Thessaloniki–Bitola railway, 152.2 kilometres (94.6 mi) from Thessaloniki, and is served by Line T2 of the Thessaloniki Regional Railway (formerly the Suburban Railway).

== History ==
Agios Panteleimonas opened in June 1894 as Pateli (Greek: Πάτελι), in what was then part of the Ottoman Empire. Upon opening, the station was part of the Salonique-Monastir branch line of the Chemins de fer Orientaux, from Thessaloniki to Bitola.

Agios Panteleimonas was annexed by Greece on 18 October 1912 during the First Balkan War. On 17 October 1925, the Greek government purchased the station along with the Greek section of the Salonique-Monastir line, and the station became part of the Hellenic State Railways, with the remaining section north of Florina seeded to Yugoslavia. After the station, along with the settlement, was renamed Amyntaio In 1926, the village and the station was renamed Agios Panteleimonas.

After the Second World War, it was decided to connect the town of Kozani to the railway network through Amyntaio and the original plan for a connection with Thessaly was abandoned. Industrial branch lines connect to the PPC power plants of Ptolemais and Agios Dimitrios, normally used by freight trains carrying light fuel oil. Another branch line to the former fertilizer plant of AEVAL is disused. The line is also used by freight trains carrying sugar beets from the Hellenic Sugar Industry factory to Platy.

In January 1951, construction started on a line to Kozani. work was completed in 1954, with the inauguration on 30 January 1955; 71 years ago. The line served the town of Ptolemaida, and connected to the lignite-fired power plants of Public Power Corporation (ΔΕΗ) at Komanos freight station. Its construction was completed in December 1954. The terminal station was Kozani.

In 1970, OSE became the legal successor to the SEK, taking over responsibilities for most of Greece's rail infrastructure. On 1 January 1971, the station and most of Greek rail infrastructure where transferred to the Hellenic Railways Organisation S.A., a state-owned corporation. Freight traffic declined sharply when the state-imposed monopoly of OSE for the transport of agricultural products and fertilisers ended in the early 1990s. Many small stations of the network with little passenger traffic were closed down.

Since 2007, the station is served by the Thessaloniki Regional Railway. In 2008, that service was transferred from OSE to TrainOSE. In 2009, with the Greek debt crisis unfolding OSE's Management was forced to reduce services across the network. Timetables were cutback, and routes closed as the government-run entity attempted to reduce overheads. In August 2013, Regional Railway services were extended to Florina. In 2017 OSE's passenger transport sector was privatised as TrainOSE, currently a wholly owned subsidiary of Ferrovie dello Stato Italiane infrastructure, including stations, remained under the control of OSE. In July 2022, the station began being served by Hellenic Train, the rebranded TranOSE.

The station is owned by GAIAOSE, which since 3 October 2001 owns most railway stations in Greece: the company was also in charge of rolling stock from December 2014 until October 2025, when Greek Railways (the owner of the Thessaloniki–Bitola railway) took over that responsibility.

== Facilities ==
Agios Panteleimonas is an unstaffed halt with waiting facilities inside a shelter.

== Services ==
As of September 2026, Line T2 of the Thessaloniki Regional Railway calls at this station: service is currently limited compared to October 2012, with two trains per day to Thessaloniki, and two trains per day to Florina.

There are currently no services to Bitola in North Macedonia, because the international connection from Mesonisi to Neos Kafkasos is currently disused.

== Station layout ==
Level E1
Platform 1
← to Florina (Amyntaio)
to Thessaloniki (Arnissa) →
Side platform, doors open on the right
G
- Concourse
- Waiting area
- Exit

== See also ==
- Railway stations in Greece
- Hellenic Railways Organisation
- Hellenic Train
- Thessaloniki Regional Railway
