= Xechasmeni railway station =

Railway station in Central Macedonia, Greece

Ξεχασμένη Xechasmeni

General information
- Location: Veria 591 32; Imathia; Greece
- Coordinates: 40°33′48″N 22°20′15″E
- Owner: GAIAOSE
- Operator: Hellenic Train
- Line: Thessaloniki–Bitola railway
- Platforms: 1
- Tracks: 2 (1 disused)

Construction
- Structure type: at-grade
- Platform levels: 1
- Parking: Yes
- Cycle facilities: No

Other information
- Status: Staffed
- Website: http://www.ose.gr/en/

History
- Opened: 1894
- Former names: Gidas

Services
Preceding station	Regional Rail	Following station
Kouloura towards Florina	Line T2	Kefalochori towards Thessaloniki
Location
- Location within Greece

The Xechasmeni railway station (Greek: Σιδηροδρομικός σταθμός Ξεχασμένη, romanized: Sidirodromikós stathmós Xechasmeni) is the railway station that serves the nearby village of Xechasmeni in Central Macedonia, Greece. The station is located just west of the settlement, on the Thessaloniki–Bitola railway, and is currently served by the Thessaloniki Regional Railway (formerly the Suburban Railway).

== History ==
Opened in 1894 in what was then the Ottoman Empire, at the completion of the Société du Chemin de Fer ottoman Salonique-Monastir, a branchline of the Chemins de fer Orientaux from Thessaloniki to Bitola. During this period Northern Greece and the southern Balkans were still under Ottoman rule, and Adendro was known as Kirtzilar. Adendro was annexed by Greece on 18 October 1912 during the First Balkan War. On 17 October 1925, The Greek government purchased the Greek sections of the former Salonica Monastir railway and the railway became part of the Hellenic State Railways, with the remaining section north of Florina seeded to Yugoslavia. In 1970 OSE became the legal successor to the SEK, taking over responsibilities for most of Greece's rail infrastructure. On 1 January 1971, the station, and most of Greek rail infrastructure was transferred to the Hellenic Railways Organisation S.A., a state-owned corporation. Freight traffic declined sharply when the state-imposed monopoly of OSE for the transport of agricultural products and fertilisers ended in the early 1990s. Many small stations of the network with little passenger traffic were closed down. On 9 September 2007, the station reopened. Since 2007, the station is served by the Thessaloniki Regional Railway. In 2009, with the Greek debt crisis unfolding OSE's Management was forced to reduce services across the network. Timetables were cut back and routes closed as the government-run entity attempted to reduce overheads. In 2017 OSE's passenger transport sector was privatised as TrainOSE, currently, a wholly owned subsidiary of Ferrovie dello Stato Italiane infrastructure, including stations, remained under the control of OSE.

The station is owned by GAIAOSE, which since 3 October 2001 owns most railway stations in Greece: the company was also in charge of rolling stock from December 2014 until October 2025, when Greek Railways (the owner of the Thessaloniki–Bitola railway) took over that responsibility.

== Facilities ==
The station is still housed in the original 19th-century brick-built station building. However, buildings are rundown and almost abandoned. As of (2020) the station is unstaffed, with no staffed booking office or waiting rooms. There is no footbridge over the lines, though passengers can walk across the rails, it is, however not wheelchair accessible. The station is only equipped with only bus ‘like’ shelter on a single short platform, with no digital display screens or timetable poster boards. The station has no toilet facilities. As a result, the station is currently little more than an unstaffed halt. However, infrequent buses do call at the station.

== Services ==
As of September 2026, Line T2 of the Thessaloniki Regional Railway calls at this station: service is currently limited compared to October 2012, with three trains per day to Thessaloniki, two trains per day to Florina (via Edessa), and one train per day to Edessa.

There are currently no services to Bitola in North Macedonia, because the international connection from Mesonisi to Neos Kafkasos is currently disused.

== Station Layout ==
L Ground/Concourse	Customer service	Tickets/Exits
Level; L1	Side platform, platform disused
Level; L1	Platform 1a	towards Thessaloniki (Kouloura) ←
Level; L1	Platform 1b	towards Florina (Kefalochorion) →
Level; L1	Side platform, doors will open on the right
