= Agras railway station =

Greek railway station

Άγρας Agras
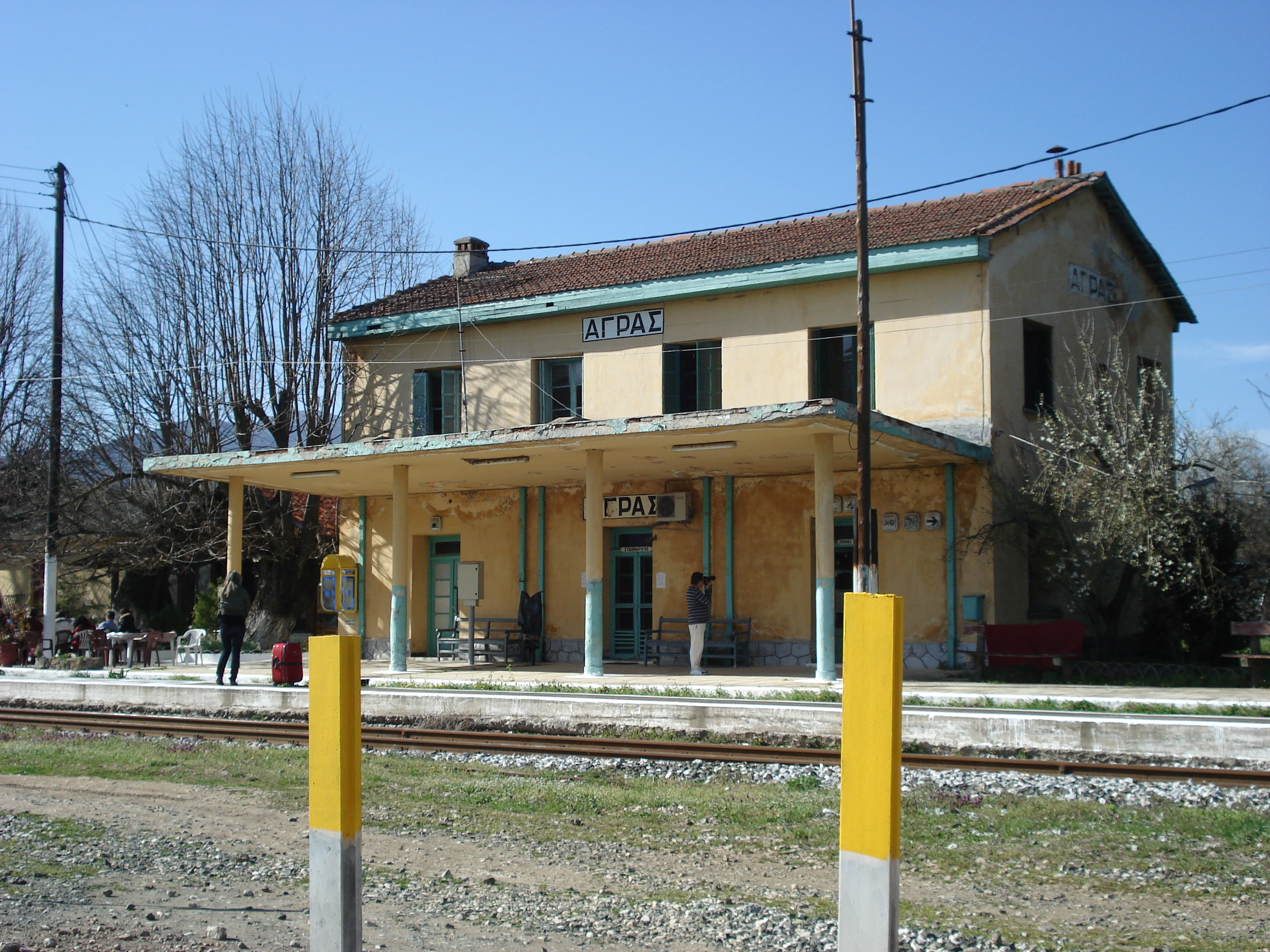
- Agios railway station building, April 2009

General information
- Location: 582 00, Edessa; Pella; Greece
- Coordinates: 40°48′35″N 21°58′52″E
- Elevation: 482 metres (1,581 ft)
- Owner: GAIAOSE
- Operator: Hellenic Train
- Line: Thessaloniki–Bitola railway
- Distance: 119.1 kilometres (74.0 mi) from Thessaloniki
- Platforms: 3 (2 disused)
- Tracks: 3 (2 disused)

Construction
- Structure type: at-grade
- Platform levels: 1
- Parking: No
- Cycle facilities: No

Other information
- Status: Unstaffed
- Website: http://www.ose.gr/en/

History
- Opened: 1894
- Former names: Vladovon
- Original company: Chemins de fer Orientaux

Services
Preceding station	Regional Rail	Following station
Arnissa towards Florina	Line T2	Edessa towards Thessaloniki
Location
- Location within Greece

Agras railway station (Greek: Άγρας) is the railway station of Agras, a village in Central Macedonia, Greece. The station is located about 2 kilometres (1.2 mi) west from the center of the settlement, on the Thessaloniki–Bitola railway, 119.1 kilometres (74.0 mi) from Thessaloniki, and is served by Line T2 of the Thessaloniki Regional Railway (formerly the Suburban Railway).

== History ==
Agras opened in June 1894 as Vladovon (Greek: Βλάδοβον), in what was then part of the Ottoman Empire. Upon opening, the station was part of the Salonique-Monastir branch line of the Chemins de fer Orientaux, from Thessaloniki to Bitola.

Agras was annexed by Greece on 18 October 1912 during the First Balkan War: the station building was built in 1916 following a decision of the French headquarters in Thessaloniki, with Serbian soldiers worked on the construction of the building. In May 1918, the station was bombed by the German air force. On 17 October 1925, the Greek government purchased the station along with the Greek section of the Salonique-Monastir line, and the station became part of the Hellenic State Railways. In 1926, the village and the station was renamed Agras.

Since 2007, the station is served by the Thessaloniki Regional Railway. In 2008, that service was transferred from OSE to TrainOSE. In 2009, with the Greek debt crisis unfolding OSE's Management was forced to reduce services across the network. Timetables were cutback, and routes closed as the government-run entity attempted to reduce overheads. In August 2013, Regional Railway services were extended to Florina. In 2017 OSE's passenger transport sector was privatised as TrainOSE, currently a wholly owned subsidiary of Ferrovie dello Stato Italiane infrastructure, including stations, remained under the control of OSE. In July 2022, the station began being served by Hellenic Train, the rebranded TranOSE.

The station is owned by GAIAOSE, which since 3 October 2001 owns most railway stations in Greece: the company was also in charge of rolling stock from December 2014 until October 2025, when Greek Railways (the owner of the Thessaloniki–Bitola railway) took over that responsibility.

== Facilities ==
Agras is an unstaffed station, but there is a seated waiting area at the station building's canopy. There is a buffet called the "Agras Station Taverna" (Greek: Ταβέρνα Σταθμός Άγρα) at the adjacent building.

== Services ==
As of September 2026, Line T2 of the Thessaloniki Regional Railway calls at this station: service is currently limited compared to October 2012, with two trains per day to Thessaloniki, and two trains per day to Florina.

There are currently no services to Bitola in North Macedonia, because the international connection from Mesonisi to Neos Kafkasos is currently disused.

== Station layout ==
G
- Concourse
- Taverna
- Waiting area
- Exit
Level E1
Side platform, doors open on the right
Platform 1
Disused
Island platform, doors open on the right
Platform 2
← to Florina (Arnissa)
to Thessaloniki (Edessa) →

== See also ==
- Railway stations in Greece
- Hellenic Railways Organisation
- Hellenic Train
- Thessaloniki Regional Railway
