= Amyntaio railway station =

Railway station in Amyntaio, West Macedonia

Αμυνταίου Amyntaio
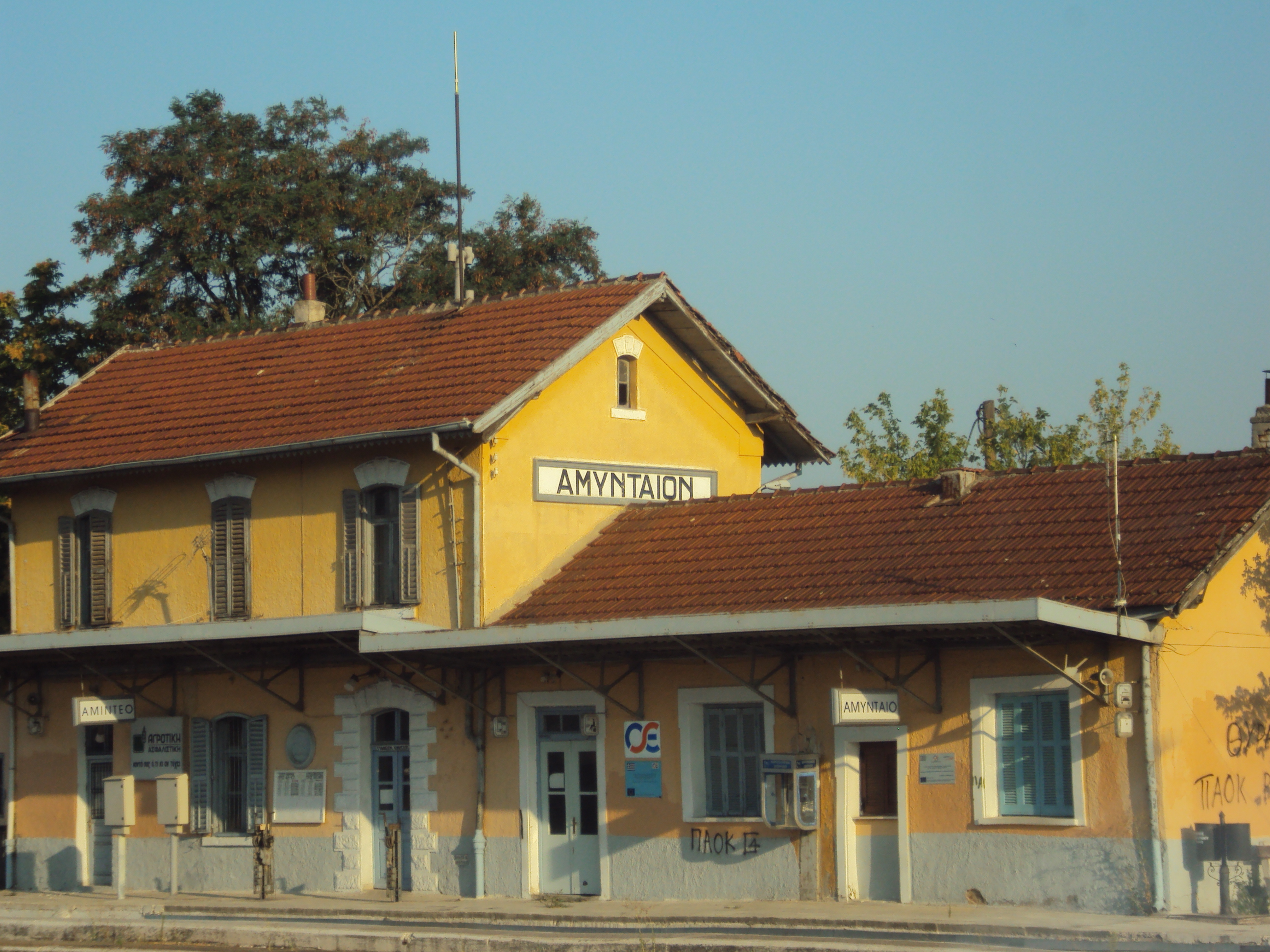
- Amyntaio railway station building, April 2009

General information
- Location: 532 00, Amyntaio; Florina (regional unit); Greece
- Coordinates: 40°41′28″N 21°41′08″E
- Elevation: 589.00 metres (1,932.41 ft)
- Owner: GAIAOSE
- Operator: Hellenic Train
- Line: Thessaloniki–Bitola railway Kozani–Amyntaio railway
- Distance: 152 kilometres (94 mi) from Thessaloniki
- Platforms: 3 (1 disused)
- Tracks: 7

Construction
- Structure type: at-grade
- Platform levels: 1
- Parking: 10x
- Cycle facilities: No

Other information
- Status: Staffed
- Website: http://www.ose.gr/en/

History
- Opened: 1894
- Former names: Sorovits (before 1928)
- Original company: Société du Chemin de Fer ottoman Salonique-Monastir

Services
Preceding station	Regional Rail	Following station
Xino Nero towards Florina	Line T2	Agios Panteleimonas towards Thessaloniki
Location
- Location within Greece

The Amyntaio railway station (Greek: Σιδηροδρομικός σταθμός Αμυνταίου, romanized: Sidirodromikós stathmós Amyntaio) is the railway station of Amyntaio in West Macedonia, Greece. The station is located close to the center of the settlement, on the Thessaloniki–Bitola railway, 152.2 kilometres (94.6 mi) from Thessaloniki, and is severed by Local services to Thessaloniki and Florina. The station is served (since 9 September 2007) by the Thessaloniki Regional Railway (formerly the Suburban Railway).

It was servered by trains on the Kozani–Amyntaio line; however these have been suspended since 2009.

== History ==
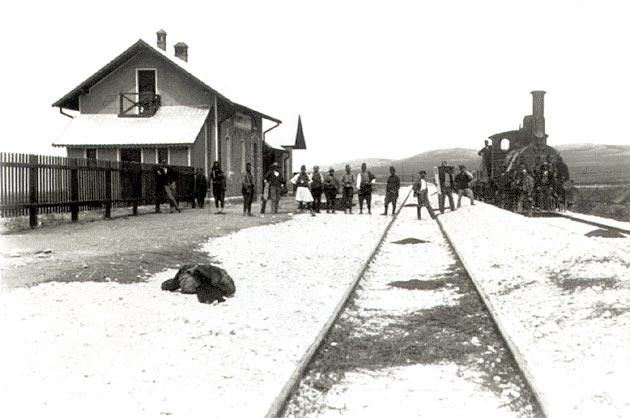
Sorovits Railway Station, ca. 1894

Opened in June 1894 as Sorovits railway station Greek: Σιδηροδρομικός σταθμός Πάτελι, romanized: Sidirodromikós stathmós Sorovits) in what was then the Ottoman Empire at the completion of the Société du Chemin de Fer ottoman Salonique-Monastir, a branchline of the Chemins de fer Orientaux from Thessaloniki to Bitola. During this period, Northern Greece and the southern Balkans where still under Ottoman rule. Amyntaio was annexed by Greece on 18 October 1912 during the First Balkan War.

On 17 October 1925 The Greek government purchased the Greek sections of the former Salonica Monastir railway, and the railway became part of the Hellenic State Railways, with the remaining section north of Florina seeded to Yugoslavia. After the station, along with the settlement, was renamed Amyntaio

After the Second World War, it was decided to connect the town of Kozani to the railway network through Amyntaio and the original plan for a connection with Thessaly was abandoned. Industrial branch lines connect to the PPC power plants of Ptolemais and Agios Dimitrios, normally used by freight trains carrying light fuel oil. Another branch line to the former fertilizer plant of AEVAL is disused. The line is also used by freight trains carrying sugar beets from the Hellenic Sugar Industry factory to Platy.

In January 1951, construction started on a line to Kozani. work was completed in 1954, with the inauguration on 30 January 1955; 71 years ago. The line served the town of Ptolemaida, and connected to the lignite-fired power plants of Public Power Corporation (ΔΕΗ) at Komanos freight station. Its construction was completed in December 1954. The terminal station was Kozani.

In 1970, OSE became the legal successor to the SEK, taking over responsibilities for most of Greece's rail infrastructure. On 1 January 1971, the station and most of Greek rail infrastructure where transferred to the Hellenic Railways Organisation S.A., a state-owned corporation. Freight traffic declined sharply when the state-imposed monopoly of OSE for the transport of agricultural products and fertilisers ended in the early 1990s. Many small stations of the network with little passenger traffic were closed down.

In 2001 the infrastructure element of OSE was created, known as GAIAOSE; it would henceforth be responsible for the maintenance of stations, bridges and other elements of the network, as well as the leasing and the sale of railway assists. Renovations on the line to Kozani were carried out between 2003 and 2007 on 22 January 2007, it was reopened with three trains daily, which departed from Kozani, arriving in Thessaloniki in three hours (instead of four hours before the renovation).

In 2007 services resumed after repairs were carried out on the trackbed. In 2009 services were reduced to one train per day. In 2010, services were suspended as part of the reorganization of Trainose, and under the pretext that the line was considered unprofitable, depriving the prefecture of Kozani and the cities of Ptolemaida and Kozani of rail communication. Indicatively, it was mentioned that the journey from Kozani to Thessaloniki lasted 3 hours with the IC 60/61 Pavlos Melas, while with the KTEL buses, via Egnatia Odos it is 1.5 hours).

In 2009, with the Greek debt crisis unfolding OSE's Management was forced to reduce services across the network. Timetables were cutback, and routes closed as the government-run entity attempted to reduce overheads; this included the Kozani–Amyntaio line. From 1 August 2009, the passenger services were reduced to only one train per day and the passenger services were withdrawn completely in 2010, as part of the reorganization of Trainose, and under the pretext that the line was considered unprofitable, depriving the prefecture of Kozani and the cities of Ptolemaida and Kozani of a rail connection. Indicatively, it was mentioned that the journey from Kozani to Thessaloniki took 3 hours with the IC 60/61 Pavlos Melas, while with the KTEL buses, via Egnatia Odos the journey took 1.5 hours). In August 2013, Proastiakos services where extended to Florina.

In 2017 OSE's passenger transport sector was privatised as TrainOSE, currently a wholly owned subsidiary of Ferrovie dello Stato Italiane infrastructure, including stations, remained under the control of OSE. In 2019 The Special Urban Development Study of the Kozani Railway Station was approved. however passenger services have yet to recommence. In July 2022, the station began being served by Hellenic Train, the rebranded TranOSE. Infrequent freight trains still use the Kozani line to reach the PPC power-generating stations.

The station is owned by GAIAOSE, which since 3 October 2001 owns most railway stations in Greece: the company was also in charge of rolling stock from December 2014 until October 2025, when Greek Railways (the owner of the Thessaloniki–Bitola railway) took over that responsibility.

== Facilities ==
The station is still housed in the original 19th-century brick-built station building; as of (2022) the station is staffed, with a staffed booking office at peek times and waiting rooms, these are slightly rundown. Platform 1 has sheltered seating located under the canapy, as well as a public payphone. The station signage advertised toilets, but these are now closed. There are no dot-matrix display departure and arrival screens or timetable poster boards on the platforms. The station has some 10 parking spaces located in the forecourt, as well as a taxi rank/pickup.

== Services ==
As of September 2026, Line T2 of the Thessaloniki Regional Railway calls at this station: service is currently limited compared to October 2012, with two trains per day to Thessaloniki, and two trains per day to Florina.

There are currently no services to Bitola in North Macedonia, because the international connection from Mesonisi to Neos Kafkasos is currently disused. Trains on the Kozani–Amyntaio line ceased in 2009.

== Station layout ==
L Ground/Concourse	Customer service	Tickets/exits
Level; Ε1	Side platform, doors will open on the right
Level; Ε1	Platform 1	← towards Florina (Xino Nero)
Level; Ε1	Island platform, doors open on the right/left
Level; Ε1	Platform 2	towards Thessaloniki (Ag. Panteleimonas) →
Level; Ε1	Island platform, doors open on the right/left
Level; Ε1	Platform 3	Not in use

== Gallery ==
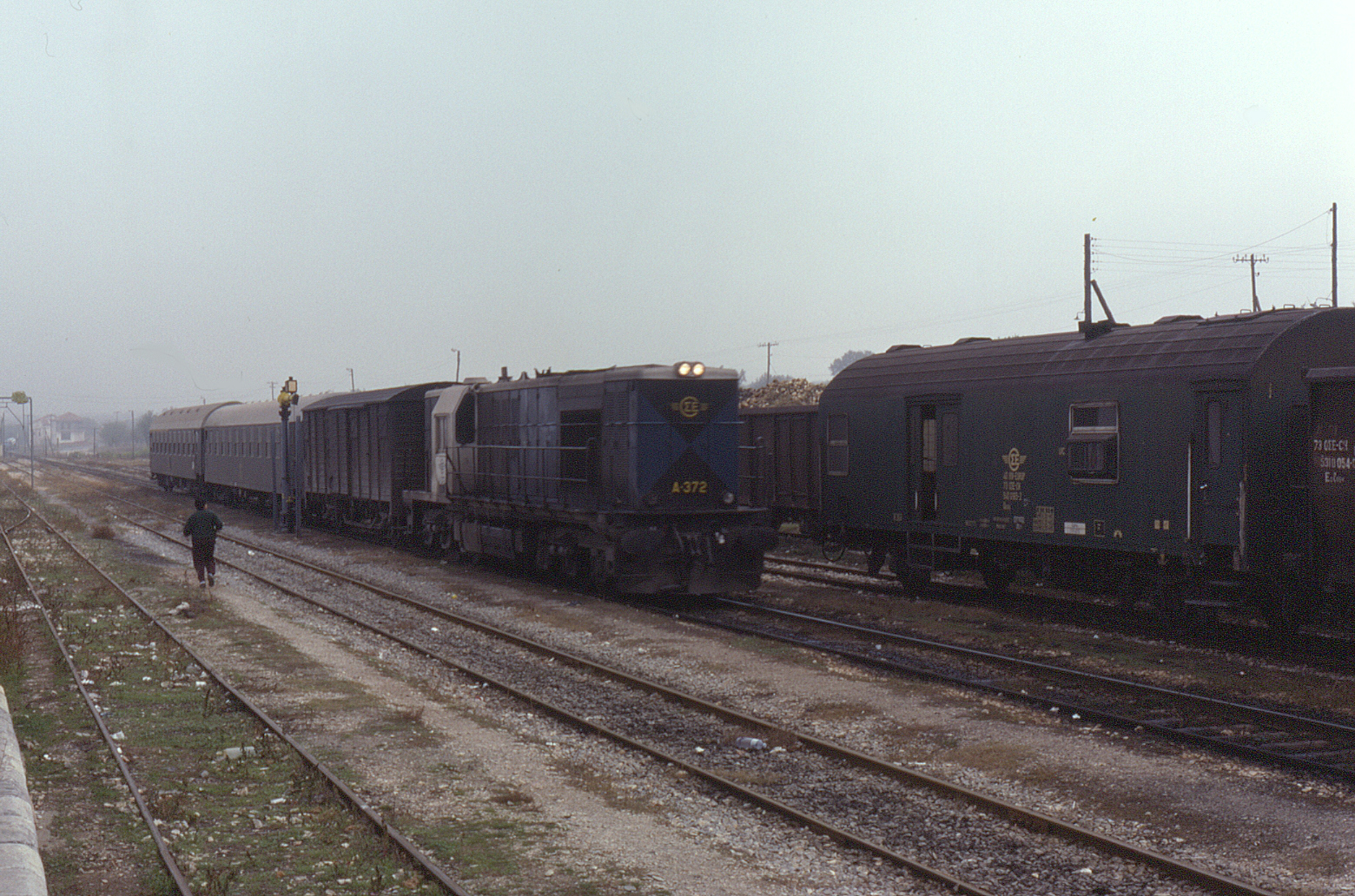
Alsthom Pielstick loco no. A.372 at Amyntaio sidings, ready to depart for Kozáni, 4 November 1992

== See also ==
- Railway stations in Greece
- Hellenic Railways Organization
- Hellenic Train
- Proastiakos
