= Line T2 (Thessaloniki Regional Railway) =

Rapid transit line in Athens, Greece

Line T2 (Thessaloniki–Florina)
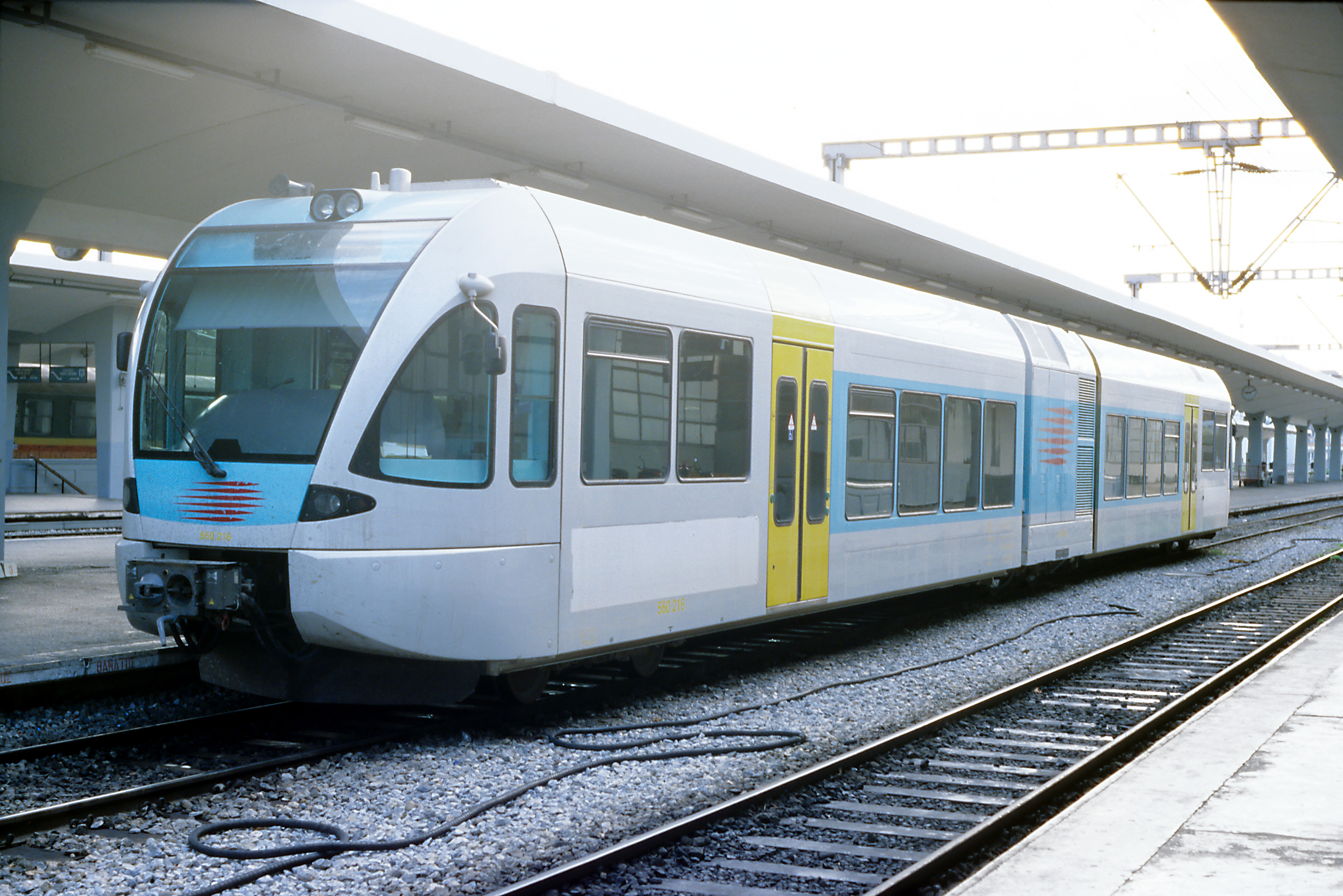
- A Stadler GTW 2/6 terminating at Thessaloniki.

Overview
- Service type: Commuter rail
- Status: Operating
- Locale: Greece (Attica)
- First service: 25 January 2008; 18 years ago
- Current operator: Hellenic Train
- Former operator: TrainOSE
- Website: www.hellenictrain.gr

Route
- Termini: Thessaloniki; Florina
- Distance travelled: 111.7 km (69.4 mi)
- Average journey time: 1 hour and 35 minutes
- Service frequency: 2 per-day
- Line used: Thessaloniki–Bitola railway

Technical
- Rolling stock: OSE Class 560 (DMU)
- Track gauge: 1,435 mm (4 ft 8 1/2 in) standard gauge
- Operating speed: 160 km/h (99 mph) (average); 200 km/h (124 mph) (highest)
- Track owners: OSE (Lines), Gaiose (Buildings)

Line T2 is an Thessaloniki Regional Railway (Proastiakos) line in Western Macedonia, Greece, managed by Hellenic Train. The service connects Florina with Thessaloniki. The line shares a part of its course with lines T1. The first Suburban line was inaugurated in Athens on 30 July 2004, using 17 OSE Class 560 DMUs. When these lines were electrified, the OSE Class 560 units where relocated to Thessaloniki.

== History ==
The route was first introduced as a regional service and became part of the suburban railway network during the 2010s. Initially operating as a single daily return service between Thessaloniki and Florina, its frequency has since increased, although it remains one of the less frequent suburban routes. It serves both local commuters and interregional passengers traveling between Central and Western Macedonia.

Efforts to electrify the entire route have been proposed but remain incomplete as of 2025, with diesel units continuing to operate west of Edessa.

== Route ==
On the Thessaloniki–Platy segment, the line shares the corridor with multiple long-distance and freight services. The line departs Thessaloniki, passing through suburban areas such as Kordelio and Sindos, a significant freight terminal and logistics hub. The route continues westward through Veria and Naousa, key urban centres of Imathia regional unit. The terrain becomes more mountainous as the line ascends toward Edessa, with several scenic segments including river valleys and dense vegetation. This segment is partially electrified and shared with regional express services. Beyond Edessa, the line loses its electrification and is operated with DMU's. This stretch of line climbs into the highlands of Western Macedonia, serving small towns such as Arnissa, Amynteo (an important junction with the Kozani branch line), and terminates at Florina, a key provincial centre near the border with North Macedonia.

== Stations ==
The spelling of the station names on this table, in English and Greek, are according to the signage.

†	Terminal station
#	Interchange station

Station English	Station Greek	Regional unit	Opened	Interchanges	notes	Position
Thessaloniki ^{†#}	Θεσσαλονίκη	Thessaloniki	12 June 1961,	Hellenic Train Thessaloniki Metro Line 1		37.949095°N 23.643430°E
Sindos	Σίνδος	Thessaloniki	9 September 2007	Thessaloniki Regional Railway Line T1		40.674154°N 22.805510°E
Adendro	Άδενδρο	Thessaloniki	1894	Thessaloniki Regional Railway Line T1		40.674320°N 22.602700°E
Platy ^{#}	Πλατύ	Imathia	1894	Hellenic Train Thessaloniki Regional Railway Line T1		40.6365°N 22.5296°E
Aiginio	Αιγίνιο	Pieria	2007			40.2952°N 22.3308°E
Lianovergion	Λιανοβέργι	Imathia	?			40.630194°N 22.504404°E
Alexandreia	Αλεξάνδρεια	Imathia	1892			40.403714°N 22.2634°E
Loutros		Imathia				
Kefalochori		Imathia				
Xechasmeni	Ξεχασμένη	Imathia	1894			40.3348°N 22.2015°E
Kouloura						
Mesi			1894			
Veria	Βέροια		1894			40.1920°N 22.0730°E
Naoussa	Νάουσα		1894			40.3717°N 22.0802°E
Episkopi			1894			
Petraia			1894			
Skydra	Σκύδρα		1894			40.2738°N 22.0534°E
Edessa	Έδεσσα		1894			40.4832°N 21.0306°E
Agras	Άγρας		1894			40.4835°N 21.5852°E
Arnissa	Άρνισσα		1894			40.4753°N 21.5006°E
Agios Panteleimonas	Άγιος Παντελεήμονας		1894			40.4373°N 21.4445°E
Amyntaio	Αμυνταίου		1894			40.4128°N 21.4108°E
Xino NeroKleidi			1894			
Vevi	Βεύης	Florina	1894			40.4625°N 21.3403°E
Sitaria		Florina				
Mesonisi	Μεσονησίου	Florina	1929			40.7973175°N 21.4734210°E
Florina ^{†}	Φλωρίνης	Florina	1929	Bus	This station opened after the original route.	40.782079°N 21.415380°E

== See also ==
- Hellenic Railways Organisation
- Hellenic Train
- Proastiakos
