= Žabeni =

Žabeni Жабени Zhabjan
- Village
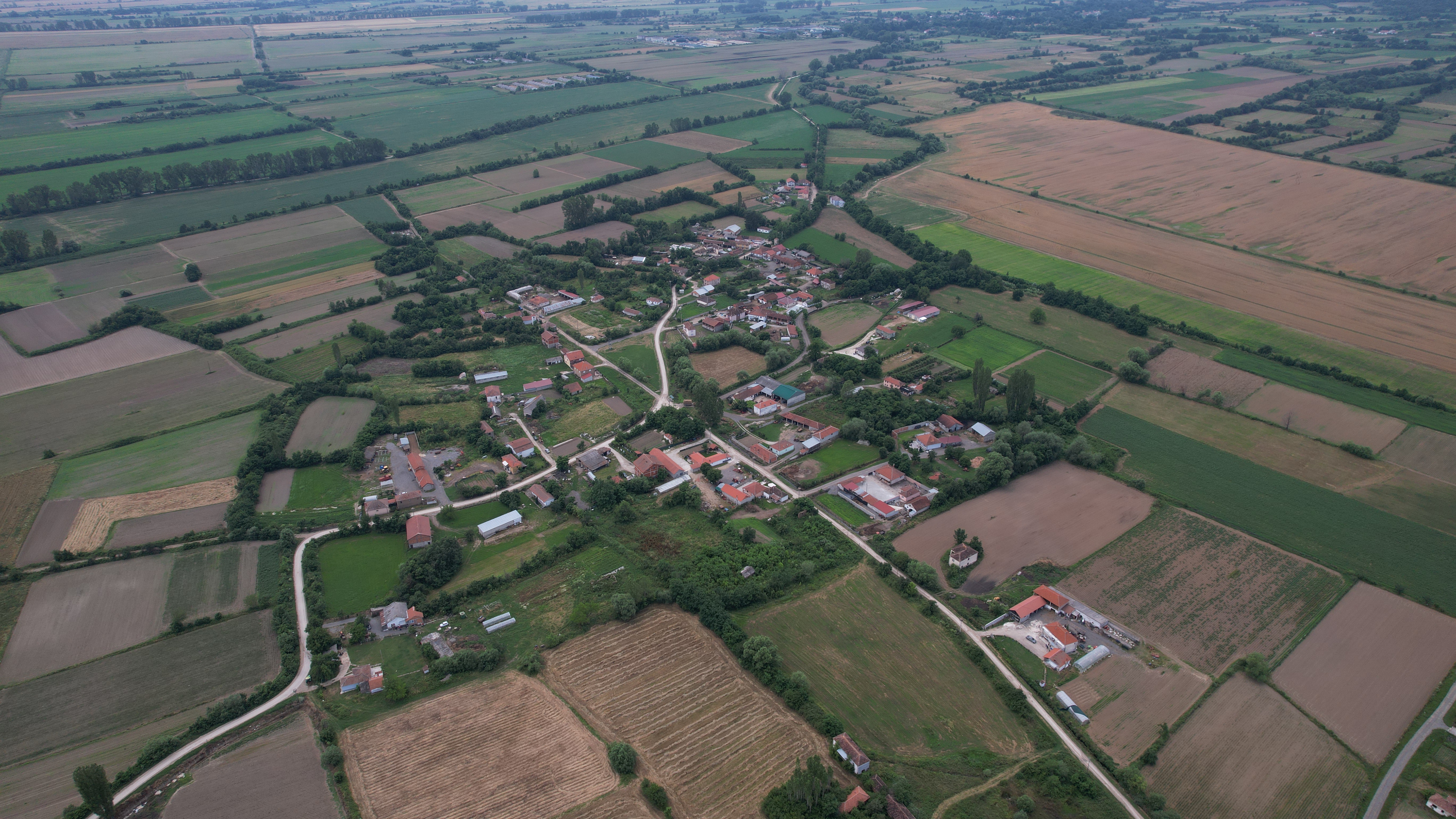
- Air view of the village Žabeni

- Location within North Macedonia
- Coordinates: 41°02′N 21°16′E
- Country: North Macedonia
- Region: Pelagonia
- Municipality: Bitola

Population (2021)
  - Total: 144
- Time zone: UTC+1 (CET)
  - Summer (DST): UTC+2 (CEST)
- Car plates: BT
- Website: .

Žabeni (Macedonian Cyrillic: Жабени; Albanian: Zhabjan) is a village in the municipality of Bitola, North Macedonia. It used to be part of the former municipality of Bistrica. It is a village 9.71 kilometers away from Bitola, which is the second largest city in the country.

== Demographics ==
Žabeni is attested in the Ottoman defter of 1467/68 as a village in the vilayet of Manastir. The inhabitants attested primarily bore typical Albanian anthroponyms, such as Gjergj, Gjin and Gjon alongside a mix of Christian and Slavic ones.

As of the 2021 census, Žabeni had 144 residents with the following ethnic composition:

- Albanians 120
- Macedonians 14
- Persons for whom data are taken from administrative sources 10

According to the 2002 census, the village had a total of 178 inhabitants. Ethnic groups in the village include:

- Albanians 143
- Macedonians 3
- Others 5
