= Thessaloniki Regional Railway =

Railway service in Macedonia, Greece

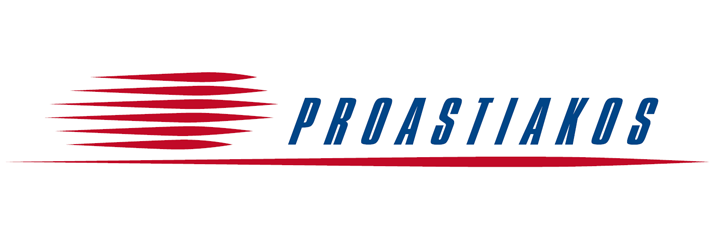

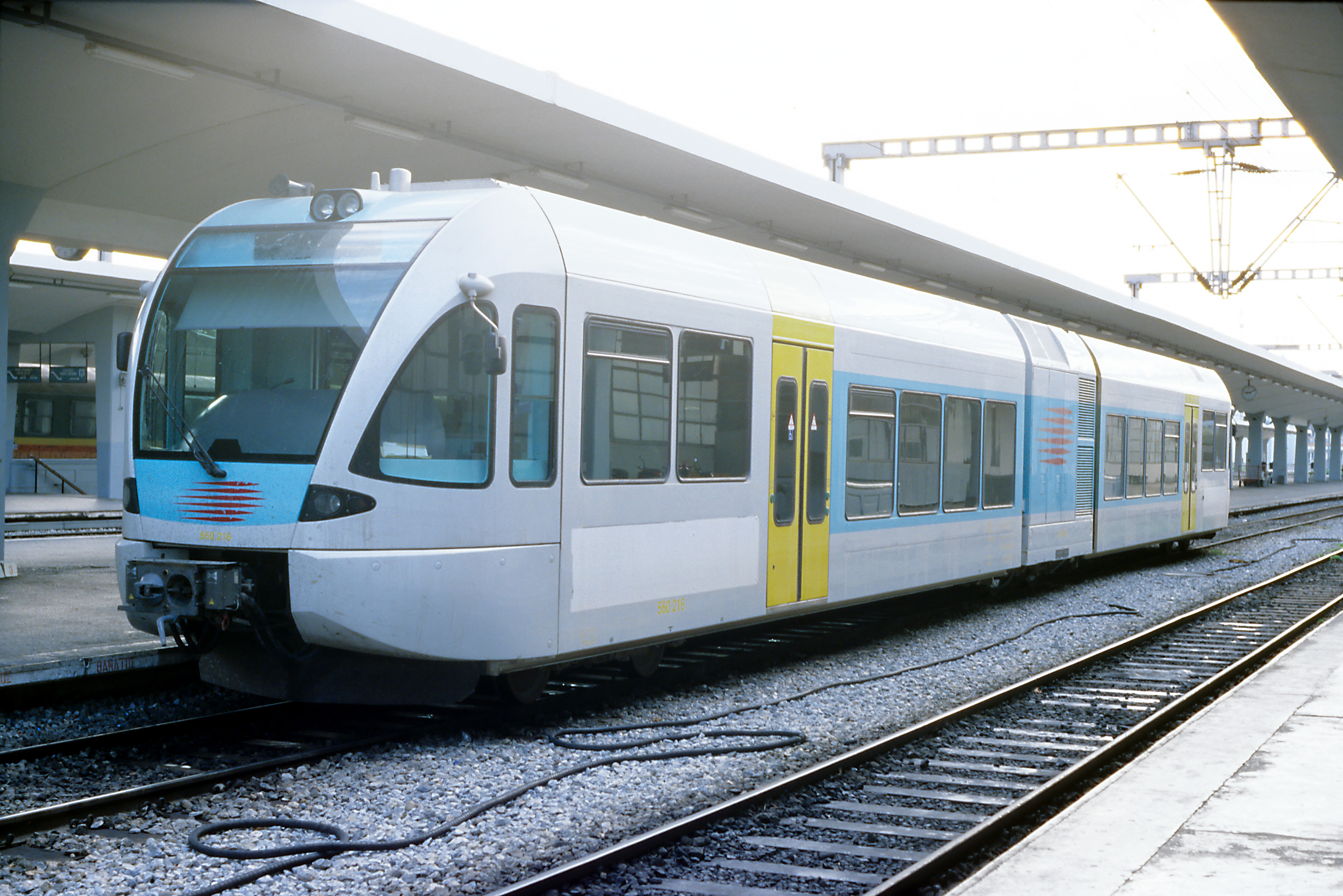
- A Stadler GTW 2/6 terminating at Thessaloniki.

Overview
- Native name: Περιφερειακές Γραμμές Θεσσαλονίκης
- Owner: OSE (Lines), Gaiose (Buildings and Trains)
- Area served: Macedonia
- Transit type: Commuter rail, regional rail
- Number of lines: 3
- Number of stations: 44
- Website: www.hellenictrain.gr (operator)

Operation
- Began operation: 7 September 2007 (Line 1); 25 January 2008 (Line 2); 3 February 2020 (Line 3)
- Operator: Hellenic Train
- Number of vehicles: EMUs OSE Class 560 DMUs

Technical
- System length: 248.9 km (154.7 mi)
- Track gauge: 1,435 mm (4 ft 8 1/2 in)
- Electrification: 25 kV AC, 50 Hz overhead lines (Thessaloniki-Larissa only)
- Top speed: 160 km/h (99 mph)(Thessaloniki-Larissa); 120 km/h (75 mph) (Platy–Florina)

The Thessaloniki Regional Railway (Greek: Περιφερειακές Γραμμές Θεσσαλονίκης, romanized: Perifereiakés Grammés Thessaloníkis), formerly the Thessaloniki Suburban Railway until 2023 (Greek: Προαστιακές Γραμμές Θεσσαλονίκης, Proastiakés Grammés Thessaloníkis), is a three-line Proastiakos commuter rail service connecting the city of Thessaloniki with its metropolitan area and the wider region of Macedonia from the west to the east.

Unlike the Athens Suburban Railway, the three lines served are rather medium-distance regional rail connections on three major axes towards Florina in the west, Larissa in the south, and Drama in the east. Thessaloniki metropolitan area itself is served by the Metro Thessaloniki, which opened in 2024.

== History ==
The Thessaloniki Regional Railway started operations on 9 September 2007 with the first line Thessaloniki-Katerini-Litochoro connecting the urban centers of Thessaloniki, Katerini, and the beaches of South Pieria and was the first suburban connection of areas outside Athens.

On 7 September 2008, with the completion of the electric drive in the Thessaloniki-Domokos section, the line was extended to Larissa. Later, the already existing line Thessaloniki-Edessa via Veria was included as a suburban one with the prospect of electrification in the near future. At the same time, in May 2008, the preliminary feasibility study of the 'SUBURBAN REGIONAL RAILWAY OF THESSALONIKI' was completed, in which the new railway connection Thessaloniki - Pella through Giannitsa was included. This study, which was updated in March 2018 at a relevant conference in Giannitsa, awaits its finalization in accordance with the commitment of the Prime Minister, at the regional development conference for Central Macedonia held in March 2018 in Thessaloniki.

On February 3, 2020, a third suburban line was inaugurated that connects Thessaloniki with Serres.

On the 4 November 2020, due to the COVID-19 pandemic many services across the network were suspended.

== Lines and services ==
As of March 2025, the Thessaloniki Regional Railway consists of three lines:

- Line T1 connects Larissa and Thessaloniki, with some trains starting at Palaiofarsalos.
- Line T2 runs between Thessaloniki and Florina, with some trains starting at Edessa.
- Line T3 connects Thessaloniki and Drama.

Trains run from approximately 6:00 am to 22:00 pm daily on a fairly irregular basis, roughly once an hour. Lines T1 and T2, however somewhat complement each other between Thessaloniki and Platy. On 17 July 2014 services were cut back from eight to six services a day from Thessaloniki To Edessa.

Proastiakos routes
Route	Opening	Route	Length	Electric	Top Speed	Stations
Thessaloniki Regional Railway Line T1	7 September 2007 (Litochoro–Thessaloniki) 7 September 2008 (Larissa–Litochoro)	Thessaloniki–Larissa	165.2 km (102.7 mi)	Yes	160 km/h (99 mph)	12
Thessaloniki Regional Railway Line T2	25 January 2008 (Thessaloniki–Edessa) 10 August 2013 (Edessa–Florina)	Thessaloniki–Florina	111.7 km (69.4 mi)	No	120 km/h (75 mph)	17
Thessaloniki Regional Railway Line T3	3 February 2020 (Thessaloniki–Drama)	Thessaloniki–Drama	158.9 km (98.7 mi)	No		20

Since 19 November 2025, a shuttle service operates between Thessaloniki and Sindos, for students of the International Hellenic University: the unnumbered shuttle operates on weekdays, except academic and public holidays.

== List of stations ==
The spelling of the station names on this table, in English and Greek, are according to the signage.

†	Terminal station
#	Interchange station

The Regional railway connects with other rail services at the following stations:

#	Station	Lines	Services	Connections	Regional unit
1	Adendro #	Athens–Thessaloniki; Thessaloniki–Bitola	Thessaloniki Regional Railway Line T1 Thessaloniki Regional Railway Line T2	Hellenic Train	Thessaloniki
2	Aiginio	Athens–Thessaloniki	Thessaloniki Regional Railway Line T1	Hellenic Train	Pieria
3	Alexandreia	Thessaloniki–Bitola	Thessaloniki Regional Railway Line T2	Hellenic Train	Imathia
4	Cherso	Thessaloniki–Alexandroupoli	Thessaloniki Regional Railway Line T3	Hellenic Train	Kilkis
5	Doirani	Thessaloniki–Alexandroupoli	Thessaloniki Regional Railway Line T3	Hellenic Train	Kilkis
6	Edessa	Thessaloniki–Bitola	Thessaloniki Regional Railway Line T2	Hellenic Train	Pella
7	Episkopi	Thessaloniki–Bitola	Thessaloniki Regional Railway Line T2		Imathia
8	Gallikos	Thessaloniki–Alexandroupoli	Thessaloniki Regional Railway Line T3	Hellenic Train	Kilkis
9	Hersos	Thessaloniki–Alexandroupoli	Thessaloniki Regional Railway Line T3	Hellenic Train	Kilkis
10	Kastanoussa	Thessaloniki–Alexandroupoli	Thessaloniki Regional Railway Line T3	Hellenic Train	Serres
11	Katerini	Athens–Thessaloniki	Thessaloniki Regional Railway Line T1	Hellenic Train	Pieria
12	Kefalochori	Thessaloniki–Bitola	Thessaloniki Regional Railway Line T2		Imathia
13	Kilkis	Thessaloniki–Alexandroupoli	Thessaloniki Regional Railway Line T3	Hellenic Train	Kilkis
14	Korinos	Athens–Thessaloniki	Thessaloniki Regional Railway Line T1	Hellenic Train	Pieria
15	Kouloura	Thessaloniki–Bitola	Thessaloniki Regional Railway Line T2		Imathia
16	Larissa †#	Athens–Thessaloniki	Thessaloniki Regional Railway Line T1	Hellenic Train	Larissa
17	Leptokarya	Athens–Thessaloniki	Thessaloniki Regional Railway Line T1	Hellenic Train	Pieria
18	Lianovergi	Thessaloniki–Bitola	Thessaloniki Regional Railway Line T2		Imathia
19	Litochoro	Athens–Thessaloniki	Thessaloniki Regional Railway Line T1	Hellenic Train	Pieria
20	Loutros	Thessaloniki–Bitola	Thessaloniki Regional Railway Line T2		Imathia
21	Mandhraki	Thessaloniki–Alexandroupoli	Thessaloniki Regional Railway Line T3	Hellenic Train	Serres
22	Mesi	Thessaloniki–Bitola	Thessaloniki Regional Railway Line T2		Imathia
23	Metalliko	Thessaloniki–Alexandroupoli	Thessaloniki Regional Railway Line T3	Hellenic Train	Kilkis
24	Mouries	Thessaloniki–Alexandroupoli	Thessaloniki Regional Railway Line T3	Hellenic Train	Kilkis
25	Naousa	Thessaloniki–Bitola	Thessaloniki Regional Railway Line T2	Hellenic Train	Imathia
26	Nea Filadelfeia	Thessaloniki–Alexandroupoli	Thessaloniki Regional Railway Line T3	Hellenic Train	Thessaloniki
27	Neo Petritsi	Thessaloniki–Alexandroupoli	Thessaloniki Regional Railway Line T3	Hellenic Train	Serres
28	Neoi Poroi	Athens–Thessaloniki	Thessaloniki Regional Railway Line T1	Hellenic Train	Pieria
29	Omalo Thrakis	Thessaloniki–Alexandroupoli	Thessaloniki Regional Railway Line T3	Hellenic Train	Serres
30	Pedino	Thessaloniki–Alexandroupoli	Thessaloniki Regional Railway Line T3	Hellenic Train	Kilkis
31	Petrea	Thessaloniki–Bitola	Thessaloniki Regional Railway Line T2		Pella
32	Platy #	Athens–Thessaloniki; Thessaloniki–Bitola	Thessaloniki Regional Railway Line T1 Thessaloniki Regional Railway Line T2	Hellenic Train	Imathia
33	Rapsani	Athens–Thessaloniki	Thessaloniki Regional Railway Line T1	Hellenic Train	Larissa
34	Rodopolis	Thessaloniki–Alexandroupoli	Thessaloniki Regional Railway Line T3	Hellenic Train	Serres
35	Serres	Thessaloniki–Alexandroupoli	Thessaloniki Regional Railway Line T3	Hellenic Train	Serres
36	Sidirokastro	Thessaloniki–Alexandroupoli	Thessaloniki Regional Railway Line T3	Hellenic Train	Serres
37	Sindos #	Athens–Thessaloniki; Thessaloniki–Bitola	Thessaloniki Regional Railway Line T1 Thessaloniki Regional Railway Line T2	Hellenic Train	Thessaloniki
38	Skotoussa	Thessaloniki–Alexandroupoli	Thessaloniki Regional Railway Line T3	Hellenic Train	Serres
39	Skydra	Thessaloniki–Bitola	Thessaloniki Regional Railway Line T2	Hellenic Train	Pella
40	Struma	Thessaloniki–Alexandroupoli	Thessaloniki Regional Railway Line T3	Hellenic Train	Serres
41	Thessaloniki †#	Athens–Thessaloniki; Thessaloniki–Bitola	Thessaloniki Regional Railway Line T1 Thessaloniki Regional Railway Line T2 Thessaloniki Regional Railway Line T3	Hellenic Train	Thessaloniki
42	Veria	Thessaloniki–Bitola	Thessaloniki Regional Railway Line T2	Hellenic Train	Imathia
43	Vyroneia	Thessaloniki–Alexandroupoli	Thessaloniki Regional Railway Line T3		Serres
44	Xechasmeni	Thessaloniki–Bitola	Thessaloniki Regional Railway Line T2	Hellenic Train	Imathia

=== Thessaloniki-Larissa Line ===
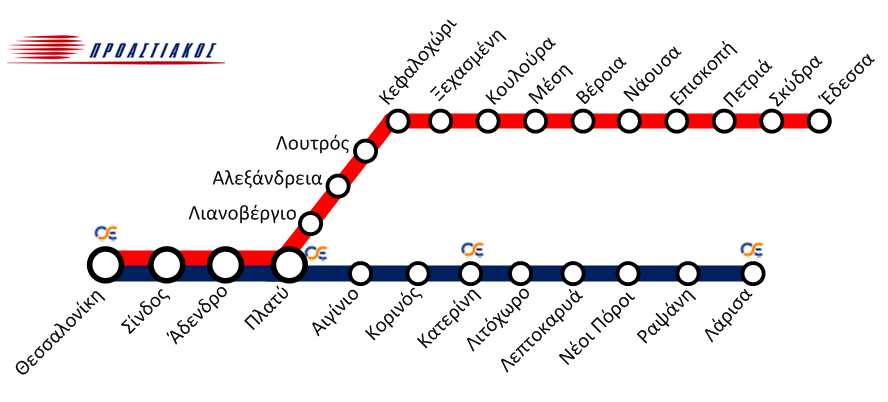
Thessaloniki Suburban Railway map c.2012, (before Line 3 was introduced)

The Line connects the Macedonian regional capital with the Thessalian regional capital. It has a total of 12 stations and is displayed in blue on TRAINOSE maps. It was inaugurated on 9 September 2007 and initially connected Thessaloniki with Katerini and the beaches of South Pieria and Litochoro, while on 7 September 2008 with the completion of the electrification of the Thessaloniki-Domokos section of track services were extended to Larissa. The section Thessaloniki-Katerini-Litochoro is the first suburban connection outside of Athens. Today, services commence from Thessaloniki station passes through Sindos, Adendro, and Platy, where it is separated from the line Thessaloniki - Edessa, continues southeast to Korinos, the city of Katerini, Litochoro, and then south to Neos Resources of Pieria. Finally, it passes east of Rapsani, through Tempi, and after crossing the Evangelism of Larissa, it ends in the city of Larissa. The line connects the urban centres of Thessaloniki, Katerini, and Larissa, as well as Pieria's southern coast, thus connecting Central Macedonia's areas with Thessaly. In the future, the construction of an intermediate stop in Panteleimon between Neoi Poroi and Leptokarya is foreseen for the re-service of Platamonas.

=== Thessaloniki-Florina Line ===
The Line connects the Macedonian regional capital with Florina in Western Macedonia. It has a total of 25 stations and is displayed in red on TRAINOSE maps. It was inaugurated in 2010 and initially connected Thessaloniki with Veria and Edessa. Later, the route to and from Florina was included in the line, which was initially operated by regional trains. In May 2008, the already existing line Thessaloniki-Edessa via Veria Line was included as a suburban service with the prospect of electrification in the near future.

Today, the service begins from Thessaloniki station, passing through Sindos, Adendro, and Plati Imathia, where it is separated from the Athens - Thessaloniki line, continues southwest to Veria, north to Naoussa and Skydra, and then west to Edessa and Lamb. Then, it continues southwest along Lake Vegoritida to Amyntaio, and after turning north to Vevi, it heads west for the last time to reach Florina. The line connected the urban centres of Thessaloniki, Veria, Florina, and Edessa as well as the waterfalls of the same name, thus uniting areas of Central and Western Macedonia.

=== Thessaloniki-Drama Line ===
The Line connects the Macedonian regional capital with its second-largest city Serres and terminates at Drama. It has a total of 20 stations and is displayed in light blue on TRAINOSE maps. Services commenced on 3 February 2020 on what is the 3rd line of the Thessaloniki suburban network, forming the daily connection of the cities with existing intermediate stations.

== Rolling stock ==
Proastiakos uses rolling stock owned by GAIAOSE and maintained by Hellenic Train. Siemens Desiro 5-car electric multiple units (EMU) are used for the Thessaloniki-Larissa services, while MAN-2000 diesel two-car multiple units (DMU-2) are used for the unnelectrified Thessaloniki-Edessa-Florina and Thessaloniki-Serres services, although can be occasionally seen on the Larissa service to either add extra capacity in cases of rolling stock unavailability or electrification problems.

In December 2025, Hellenic Train ordered 23 Alstom Coradia Stream EMUs, 11 of which are to be implemented on services in the Athens and Thessaloniki Proastiakos networks, to boost efficacy, capacity and frequency, as well as to accommodate upcoming network expansions. The first units are expected to enter service within the second trimester of 2027.

== Future expansion ==
In May 2008, the Greek government's National Transport Plan outlined the aspiration for a second link to Edessa, via Giannitsa serving Chalkidona and Pella along the way, of 50 km (31 mi) in length allowing a 30-minute reduction in journey time. This study, which was updated in March 2018 at a relevant conference in Giannitsa, awaits its finalization in accordance with the commitment of the then Prime Minister, at the regional development conference for Central Macedonia held in March 2018. Other projects include:

- Thessaloniki - Amfipoli - Nea Zichni/Kavala.
- Thessaloniki - Nea Michaniona - Epanomi - Moudania.
- Thessaloniki - Giannitsa - Skydra - Aridea.
- Aeginio-Sindos variant bypassing Plateos and Adendros to reduce time and add stations in Makrygialos, Methoni, and Skotina.
- Diavata - Kordelio - Ionian Islands - Menemeni - Engine Room - Thessaloniki.
- Sindos - Kalochori - Kordelio - Ionian Islands - KTEL - Koletti - PSST - Port of Thessaloniki.

== See also ==
- Hellenic Railways Organisation
- Hellenic Train
- Proastiakos
- Thessaloniki Metro
- Piraeus–Platy railway
- Thessaloniki–Bitola railway
- Thessaloniki–Alexandroupoli railway
- Athens Suburban Railway
- Proastiakos Patras
- Rail transport in Greece
