= Greek Railways =

Rail transport organisation of Greece

Hellenic Railways
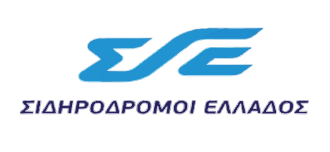
- Native name: Σιδηρόδρομοι Ελλάδος
- Industry: Rail transport
- Predecessor: OSE; ERGOSE; GAIAOSE (trackside infrastructure and Rolling stock)
- Founded: 30 August 2025
- Headquarters: Athens, Greece
- Area served: Greece
- Key people: George Ioannou (President BoD); Christos Palios (CEO BoD)
- Parent: Hellenic Republic Asset Development Fund

Hellenic Railways S.A. (Greek: Σιδηρόδρομοι Ελλάδος Μονοπρόσωπη Ανώνυμη Εταιρεία) is a national railway company which owns, maintains and operates all railway infrastructure in Greece with the exception of Athens and Thessaloniki Metro lines and Athens tram lines.

The company is exclusively responsible for the growth and maintenance of the railway network and of the rolling stock of the state.

== History ==
Hellenic Railways was established in August 2025 from the merger by the Government of Greece of infrastructure manager Hellenic Railways Organisation, project delivery subsidiary ERGOSE, and property and rolling stock company GAIAOSE. It was established in response to the Tempi train crash.

=== Existing conditions the need to establish a new entity (2023) ===
For many decades, the predecessor of Hellenic Railways, OSE, faced serious financial problems with accumulated debts and extensive bureaucratic inefficiency, while at the same time the lack of progress in project completion made the situation of the Greek railway particularly damaging for all involved parties.

At first, the operational inadequacy was addressed through the fragmentation of OSE’s responsibilities into successive business entities such as ERGOSE and GAIAOSE. However, the economic crisis and the internal administrative stagnation of the new structure did not yield the expected results, leading to further deterioration of the organization’s financial performance, the suspension of many parts of the network, and the decommissioning of a large part of the rolling stock.

In recent years, a series of railway accidents and serious incidents have revealed major deficiencies in modern operating and safety systems, such as signaling, remote control, communications, and traffic monitoring. At the same time, staff reductions, the inability to hire personnel in critical specialties, and the accumulation of external debt rendered the organization unsustainable.

Moreover, the lack of clarity in responsibilities among OSE, ERGOSE, RAS, and other bodies, the failure of coordinated management, as well as repeated warnings from the European Commission regarding insufficient compliance with European railway directives, strengthened the need for institutional reorganization. A decisive factor was the deadly Tempi train crash in 2023, which exposed serious systemic failures in key areas of prevention and control.

Within this framework, the establishment of the company Hellenic Railways Single-Member S.A. came as a necessary response for the radical redesign of the railway sector, with emphasis on safety, flexibility, transparency, and compliance with European standards. The establishment of SE was enacted into law on December 20, 2024, with effect from January 1, 2025.

== Railway management Organisation ==
The Board of Directors of the newly formed Greek Railways includes:

- George Ioannou – President
- Christos Palios – CEO
- Chrysa (Kristi) Agapitou – Vice President
- Evangelos Christogiannis – Deputy CEO
- Athanasios Staveris – Board Member
- Katerina Demerouti – Board Member
- Marios Boboulos – Board Member

The new entity assumes control over the state-owned railway infrastructure, while licensed companies continue to operate passenger and freight services on the network.

== Railway management network ==
The Hellenic Railways manage the entirety of the Greek railway infrastructure (lines and facilities), which is made available for use and operation by third-party railway companies (Hellenic Train, Urban Rail Transport, Levante Trains, Goldair Rail, Grup Feroviar Roman Hellas, and PEARL), while they are also responsible for ensuring the integrity of the network. The Greek railway network consists of 2,812.15 kilometers, of which currently less than 1,500 kilometers are available for passenger and freight use.

=== Standard Gauge Railway Axes ===
The standard-gauge lines constitute the main infrastructure of the country’s railway network and are partially electrified.

Line	Type of line	Status	Notes
Piraeus–Thessaloniki	Double–electrified	In operation	(temporarily: single track on the Domokos – Larisa section
Athens Airport–Patras	Double–electrified	In operation	The line currently goes to Aigio instead of Patras and is electrified until Kiato
Kiato-Aigio	Double	In operation	(electrification installation in the 4th quarter of 2026)
Oinoi–Chalcis	Single–electrified	In operation	
Thessaloniki - Idomenis (borders)	Single–electrified	In operation	(temporarily: freight-only line)
Thriasio - Neo Ikonio	Single	In operation	(freight-only line)
Tithorea - Mpralos - Lianokladi	Single	Suspended (out of service)	(no passenger or freight service since 03/2023)
Lianokladi - Lamia - Stylida	Single	Suspended (out of service)	(no passenger or freight service since 01/2021)
Thessaloniki - Florina	Single	In operation	(the Edessa – Florina section is awaiting a safety certificate from RAS)
Thessaloniki – Alexandroupolis	Single	In operation (partly)	(the Drama – Alexandroupoli section is temporarily a freight-only line)
Strymonas - Promachonas (borders)	Single	In operation	(temporarily: freight-only line)
Alexandroupolis–Ormenio (borders)	Single	In operation	(full restoration and upgrade expected, including infrastructure, superstructure, electrification, telecommunications, level crossings, and ERTMS works)
Aigio - Rio	Double–electrified	Under construction	(new alignment)
Ano Liosia - Megara	Single–electrified	Under construction	(coastal alignment following the route of the old metric line)
Palaiofarsalos - Kalambaka	Single–electrified	Under construction	(restoration from damages with addition of electrification, new level crossings, and ETCS Level 1)
Larissa–Volos	Single–electrified	Under construction	(restoration from damages with addition of electrification, new level crossings, and ETCS Level 1)
Polikastro - Eidomeni (variant)	Single–electrified	Under construction	(temporarily: freight-only line)
Nea Karvali - Toxotes Xanthis	Single	Under tendering process	(temporarily: freight-only line)
Kozani–Amyntaio	Single	Suspended (out of service)	(line disconnected at the AEBAL – Pontokomi section)
Mesonisi - Neos Kafkasos (borders)	Single	Suspended (out of service)	(temporarily: freight-only line)
Korinos - Aiginio	Single	Out of network	(section of the old alignment of the Piraeus – Thessaloniki railway line)
Neoi Poroi - Platamonas	Single	Out of network	(section of the old alignment of the Piraeus – Thessaloniki railway line)
Tempi - Rapsani	Single	Out of network	(section of the old alignment of the Piraeus – Thessaloniki railway line)
Lianokladi - Domokos	Single	Out of network	(section of the old alignment of the Piraeus – Thessaloniki railway line)
Agios Dionysios Piraeus - Agios Ioannis Rentis	Single	Out of network	(section of the old alignment of the Piraeus – Thessaloniki railway line)
