= Thessaloniki–Bitola railway =

Balkan railway

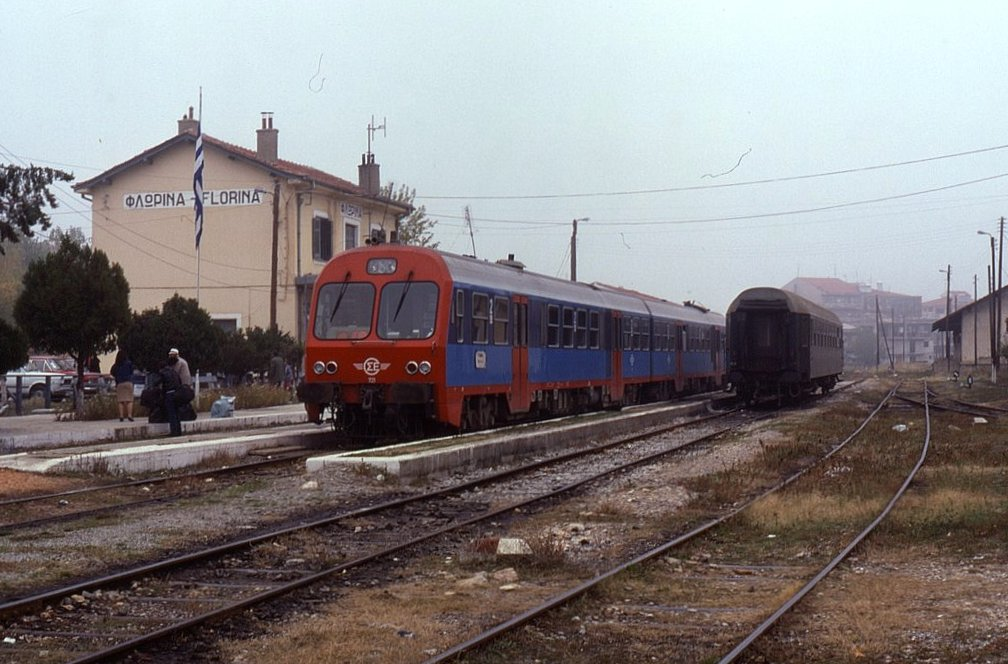
- View of Florina railway station on the network in 1992.

Overview
- Status: Operational up to Neos Kafkasos
- Owner: Hellenic Railways Organisation
- Locale: Greece (Macedonia), Republic of North Macedonia
- Termini: Thessaloniki 40.6444°N 22.9294°E; Bitola 41.0197°N 21.3429°E
- Stations: 25

Service
- Type: Regional/Commuter rail
- Operator(s): Hellenic Train

History
- Opened: June 1894

Technical
- Line length: 219 km (136 mi)
- Number of tracks: Double track Thessaloniki–Platy, remainder single track
- Character: Secondary
- Track gauge: 1,435 mm (4 ft 8 1/2 in) standard gauge
- Electrification: only the section Thessaloniki–Platy

The railway from Thessaloniki to Bitola is a 219 kilometres (136 mi) long railway line, that connects the port city Thessaloniki in Greece with Bitola in the Republic of North Macedonia, via Veroia, Edessa, Amyntaio and Florina. The line was opened in 1894 under the name "Société du Chemin de Fer ottoman Salonique-Monastir", when the area was part of the Ottoman Empire. The section between the international border and Bitola is not used anymore, and as of 2025 passenger services are restricted to the section between Thessaloniki and Florina. ŽRSM Transport also operates a daily service from Žabeni to Bitola and onwards to Skopje. The easternmost section of the line, Platy–Thessaloniki, is part of the important connection towards Athens and Northern Greece.

== Course ==
The eastern terminus of the Thessaloniki–Bitola railway is the New Railway Station, Thessaloniki. Leaving the Athens–Thessaloniki mainline at Platy, it runs alongside the Aliakmon River, through Alexandreia and then passes through to Veroia, Naousa, and Skydra, before climbing to Edessa and then, along the northern shore of Lake Vegoritida, reaching Amyntaio. At Amyntaio the Kozani–Amyntaio railway branches off towards Kozani, serving Ptolemaida and the power stations of the national power company ΔΕΗ. The main line continues towards the city of Florina. At Neos Kafkasos, the international border is crossed, and after 219 km the city of Bitola in the Republic of North Macedonia is reached. This short international connection is now disused, with all international traffic being routed via Idomeni and Gevgelija.

== Main stations ==
The main stations on the Thessaloniki–Bitola railway are:

- New Railway Station, Thessaloniki
- Platy railway station
- Veroia railway station
- Edessa railway station
- Amyntaio railway station
- Florina railway station
- Bitola railway station

== History ==
The idea of a trans-Macedonian railway had existed since the 1850s when, in January 1859, a Memorandum regarding the construction of the Salonica–Monastir (today's Bitola) line was signed. It, however, wasn't until 28 October 1890 that the Ottoman Sublime Porte gave Deutsche Bank a concession to build the railway as a branch line of the Oriental Railways and to possibly further extend it to an Albanian port.

"Société du Chemin de Fer ottoman Salonique-Monastir" was set up as an Ottoman company, and its headquarters were in Constantinople. The construction works started in May 1891 and were completed in June 1894. Upon completion, the line operations were given to the Chemins de fer Orientaux, which were already operating the Salonique to Mitrovica and Vranje railways. Whether Baron Maurice de Hirsch took an active role in this railway is debatable, considering he retired from the Balkan railway building shortly before this project began. While at that time, the practice of compulsory work was still in use, labour was cheap in rural Macedonia, and the engineers were reported to be enthusiastically welcomed.

After the end of Balkan Wars in 1913, the line ended fully in Greek territory, except for the last 17 km to Monastir, which ended up in Yugoslavia. The Greek government purchased the Greek part Salonica Monastir railway on 17 October 1925, and the railway became part of the Hellenic State Railways.

Since 2019, there has been plans to renovate the line and restore the service between Bitola and Florina. As of 2025, the only part has been actualised is the renovation of the line between Bitola and Kremenica, as well as building new stations at Kravari and Žabeni. On 1 February 2023, the section to Žabeni opened and had trains for the first time for 26 years. The project cost €17.2 million, of which €6 million came from IPA funds and €11 million from the budget.

== Locomotives ==
Locomotives of the Salonic Monastir Railway

Number	Manufacturer	Qty	Year	Type	Comments	Picture
501 to 508	Sarono	8		C	Became SEK class Δγ	
509 to 510	Maffei	2		1'C	became SEK class Eβ 231 - 232	
521 to 523	Borsig	11		1'C	Became SEK class Eγ 521 to 523	

== Services ==
The Thessaloniki–Bitola railway is used by the following passenger services:

- Intercity, Express and Regular services Athens–Thessaloniki and Thessaloniki–Kalampaka
- Local services Thessaloniki–Florina, Thessaloniki–Larissa and Skopje-Žabeni

== Gallery ==
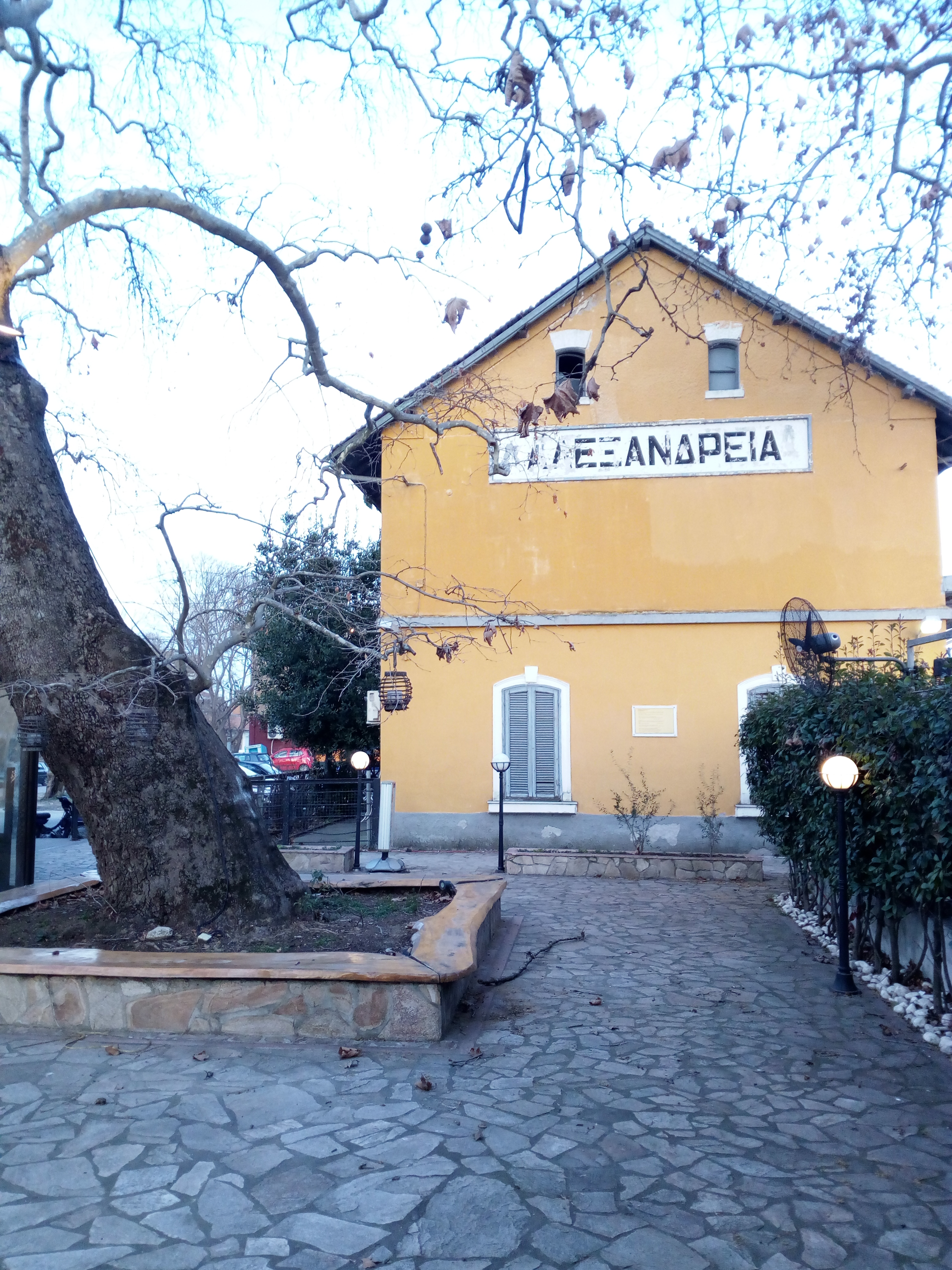
Alexandria railway station

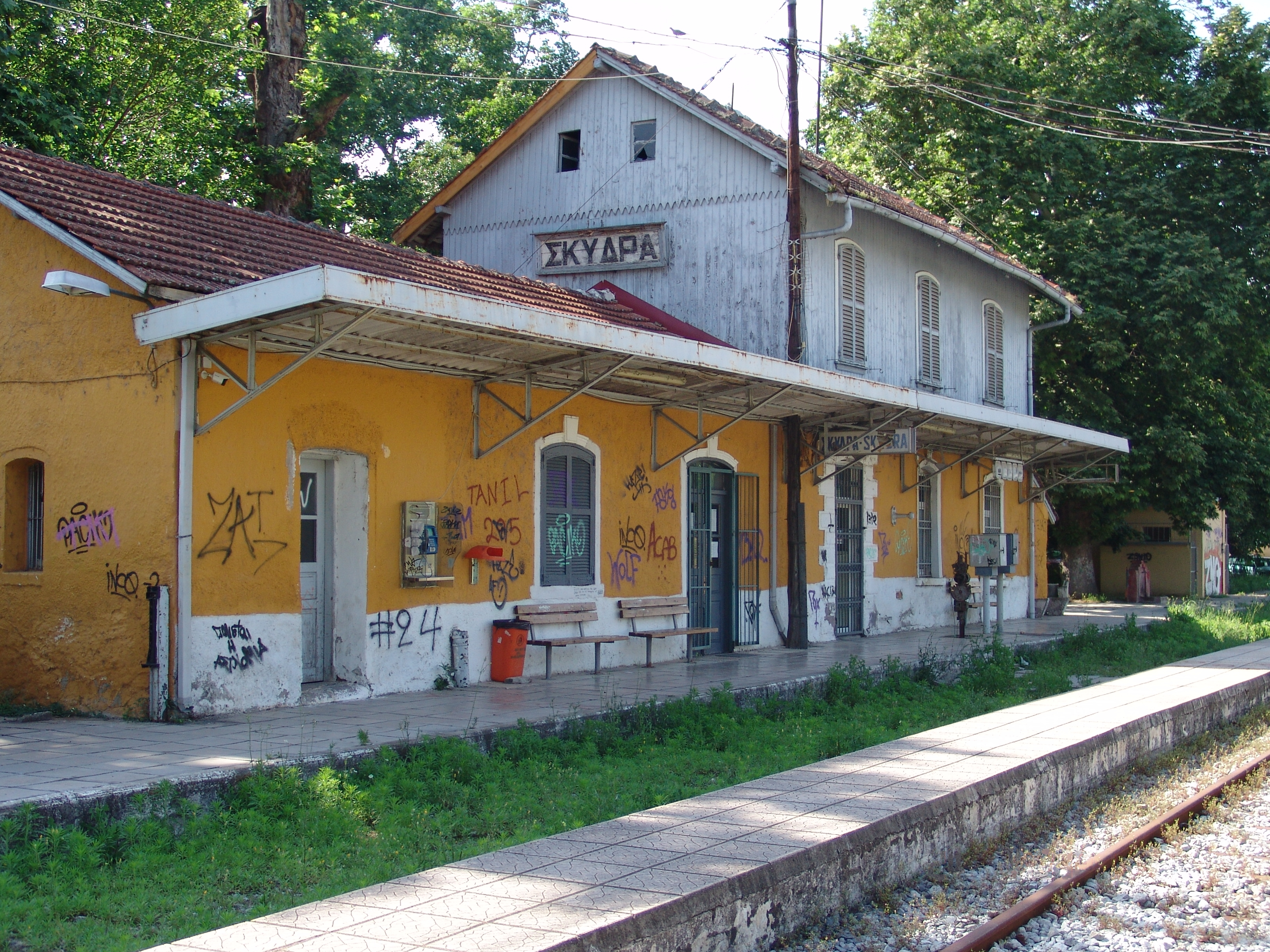
Skydra railway station

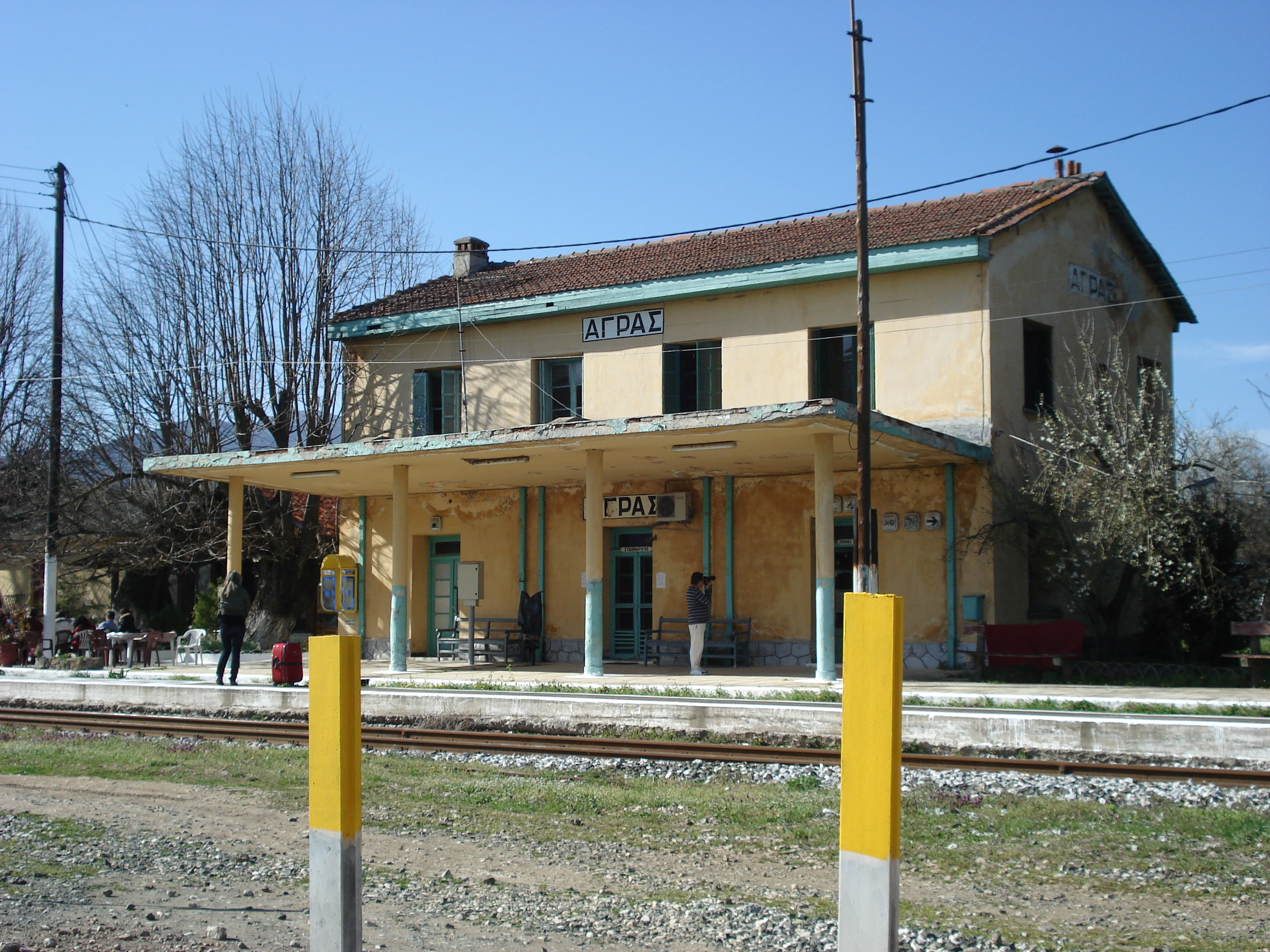
Agras railway station

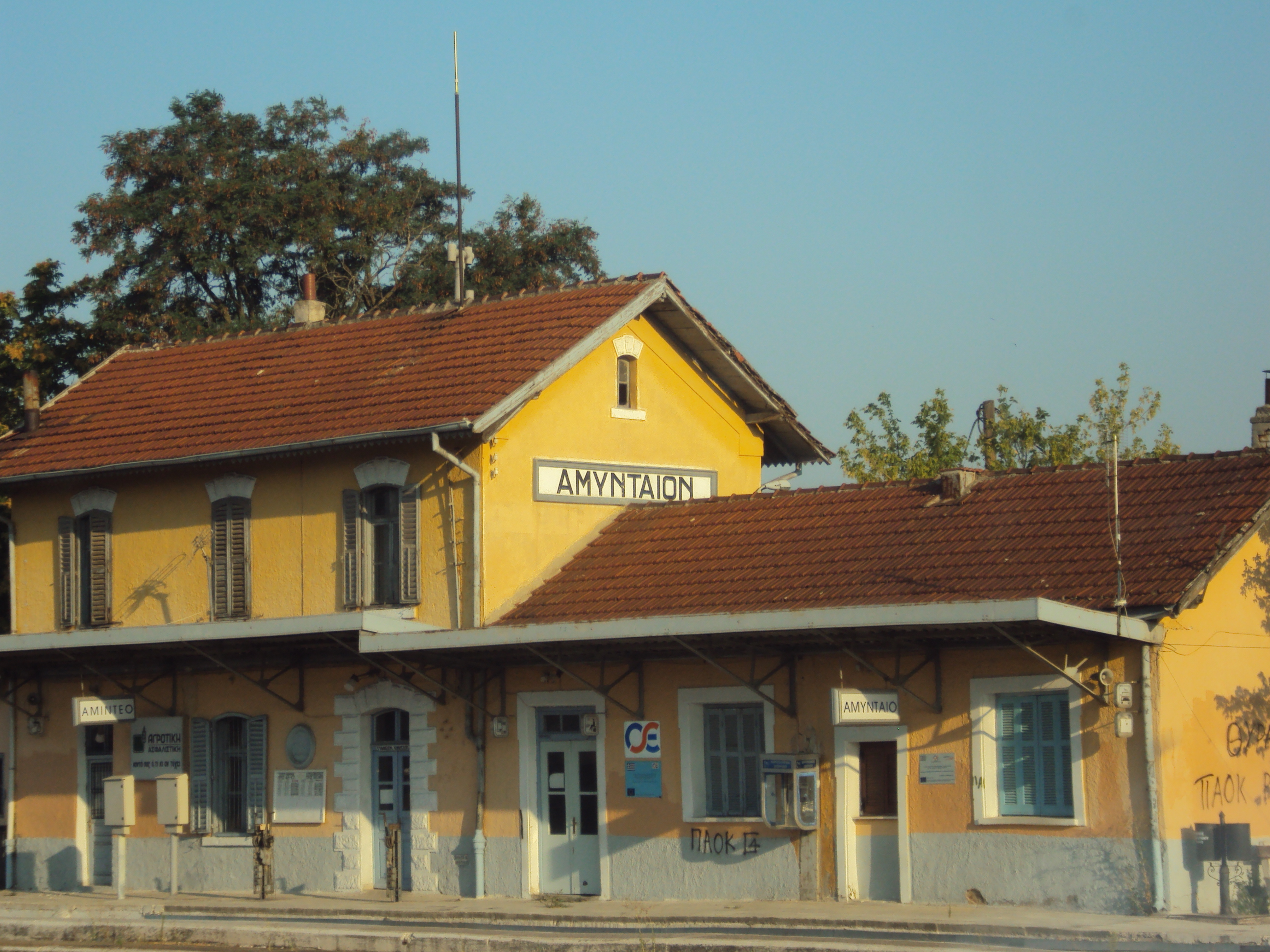
Amyntaio railway station

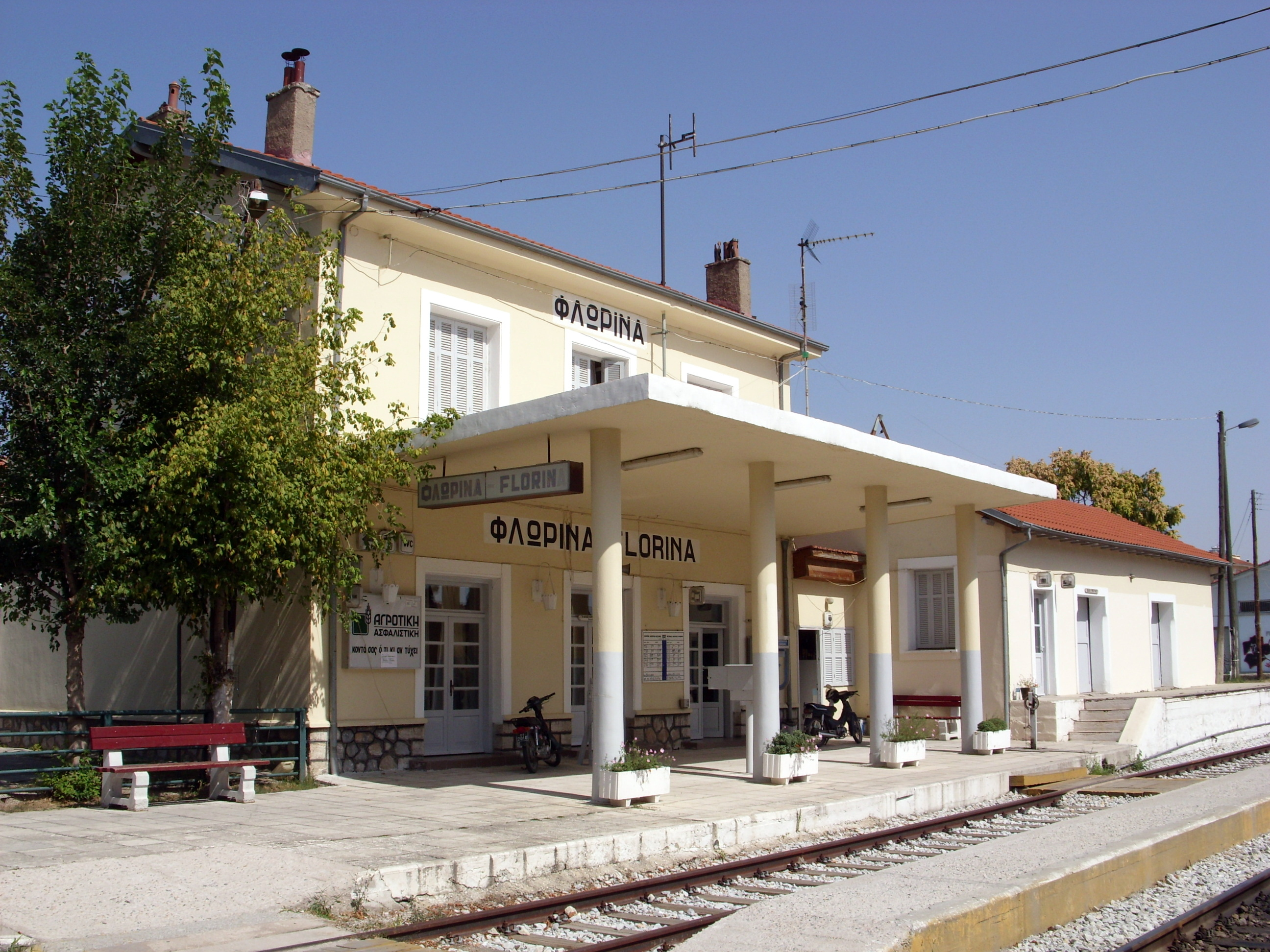
Florina railway station

== See also ==
- Chemins de fer Orientaux
- Egnatia Railway
