= Florina railway station =

Railway station of Skydra in Central Macedonia, Greece

Φλώρινα Florina
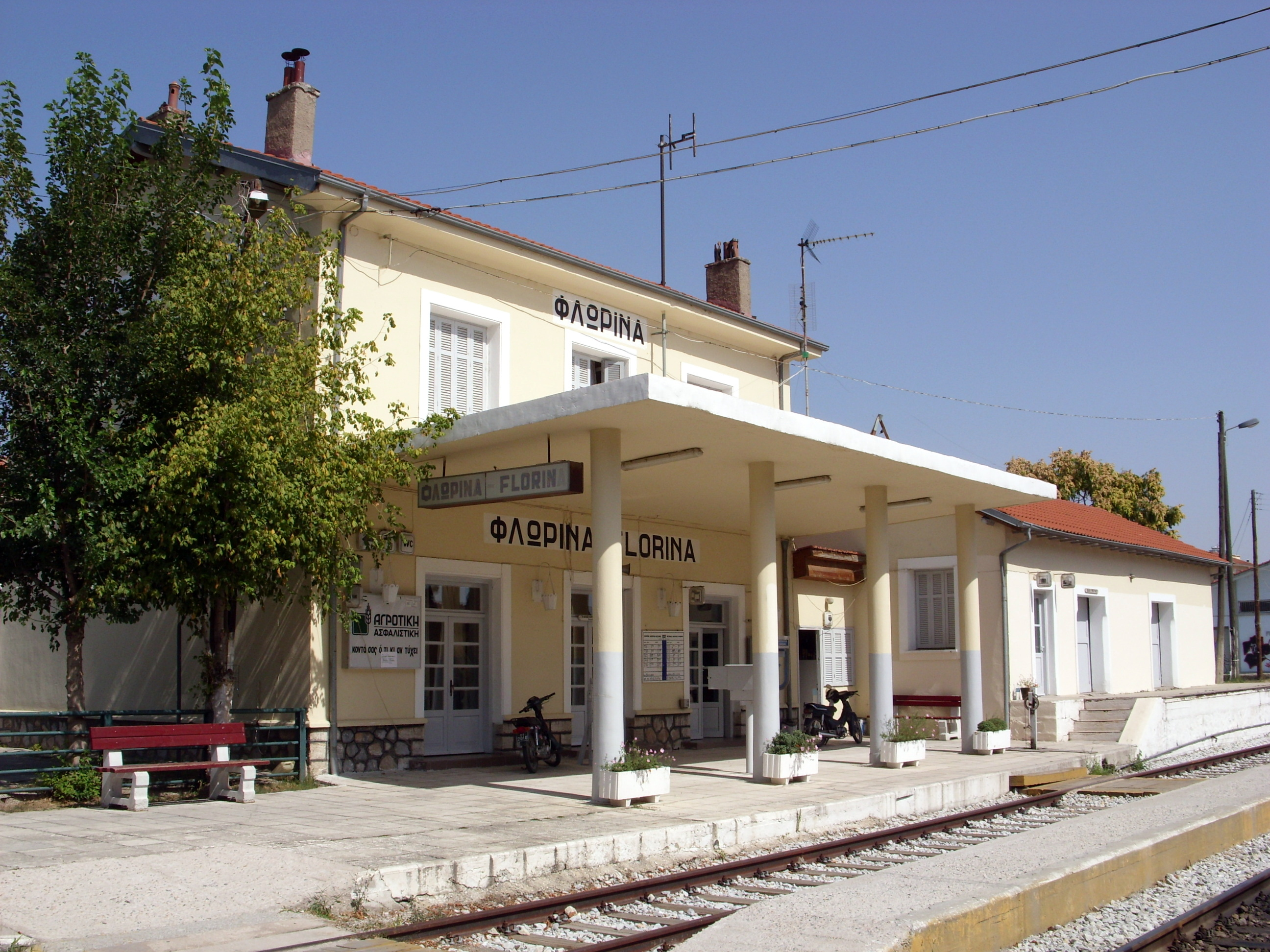
- Florina railway station (9 August 2008)

General information
- Location: Florina 531 00; Florina (regional unit); Greece
- Coordinates: 40.782079°N 21.415380°E
- Owner: GAIAOSE
- Operator: Hellenic Train
- Line: Thessaloniki–Bitola railway Messonisi–Florina railway
- Platforms: 2 (1 side platform, 1 island platform)
- Tracks: 2

Construction
- Structure type: at-grade
- Platform levels: 1
- Parking: Yes

Other information
- Status: Staffed
- Website: http://www.ose.gr/en/

History
- Opened: 1929
- Original company: Hellenic Railways Organisation

Services
Preceding station	Regional Rail	Following station
Terminus	Line T2	Mesonisi towards Thessaloniki
Location
- Location within Greece

Florina railway station (Greek: Σιδηροδρομικός σταθμός Φλωρίνης, romanized: Sidirodromikós stathmós Florínis) is a railway station in Florina, a town in Western Macedonia, Greece. It is situated at the Greek terminus of the Thessaloniki–Bitola railway. It was opened in 1929, with the station fully operational by 1931. The station is served (since 9 September 2007) by the Thessaloniki Regional Railway (formerly the Suburban Railway).

== History ==
The station opened in 1929, at the end of a short extension of track to connect Mesonisi (then known as Florina) just off the Thessaloniki–Bitola railway In the early 1920s, effects were made to extend the line to Florina. The works involved the creation of a curve of track just of the existing station and a small section of single track. Work began in July 1924 and with Law 3274/1924 the construction of a branch line to the town of Florina. Construction took around three years due in part to delays and funding issues, which had grown to 10 million drachmas (double the original estimate).

In 1929, the construction works of the line were completed, and the first trains arrived at the new temporary station in the city of Florina. The construction work on new permanent station buildings began immediately and was completed in 1931. On 15 May 1931, the station was inaugurated. The Municipal Council, at the meeting on 6-7-1931 (dec. no. 139), decides that "after the construction and operation of the new Florini Railway Station, as in the case of the old Florini Railway Station, the name Armenochorio Railway Station should be given to the new Florini Railway Station. In 1931 'Old' Florina station was renamed Mesonisi.

In 1970 OSE became the legal successor to the SEK, taking over responsibilities for most of Greece's rail infrastructure. On 1 January 1971, the station and most of the Greek rail infrastructure was transferred to the Hellenic Railways Organisation S.A., a state-owned corporation. Freight traffic declined sharply when the state-imposed monopoly of OSE for the transport of agricultural products and fertilisers ended in the early 1990s. Many small stations of the network with little passenger traffic were closed down. In 2001 the infrastructure element of OSE was created, known as GAIAOSE; it would henceforth be responsible for the maintenance of stations, bridges and other elements of the network, as well as the leasing and the sale of railway assists. In 2003, OSE launched "Proastiakos SA", as a subsidiary to serve the operation of the suburban network in the urban complex of Athens during the 2004 Olympic Games. In 2005, TrainOSE was created as a brand within OSE to concentrate on rail services and passenger interface.

In 2009, with the Greek debt crisis unfolding OSE's Management was forced to reduce services across the network. Timetables were cut back, and routes closed as the government-run entity attempted to reduce overheads. In 2008, all Proastiakos were transferred from OSE to TrainOSE. August 2013 Regional Railway services where exsteded to Florina. In 2017 OSE's passenger transport sector was privatised as TrainOSE, currently a wholly owned subsidiary of Ferrovie dello Stato Italiane infrastructure, including stations, remained under the control of OSE. In July 2022, the station began being served by Hellenic Train, the rebranded TranOSE.

The station is owned by GAIAOSE, which since 3 October 2001 owns most railway stations in Greece: the company was also in charge of rolling stock from December 2014 until October 2025, when Greek Railways (the owner of the Thessaloniki–Bitola railway) took over that responsibility.

== Facilities ==
The station is staffed only in the early morning and later afternoon. There are toilets and parking onsite. Local and regional buses stop in the forecourt.

== Services ==
As of September 2026, Line T2 of the Thessaloniki Regional Railway calls at this station: service is currently limited compared to October 2012, with two trains per day to Thessaloniki, and two trains per day from Thessaloniki.

== Station layout ==
L Ground/Concourse	Customer service	Tickets/Exits
Level; L1	Side platform, doors will open on the right
Level; L1	Platform 1	← to Thessaloniki (Vevi)
Level; L1	Platform 2	← to Thessaloniki (Mesonisi)
Level; L1	Side platform, doors will open on the right
