= Hellenic Railway Properties =

Greek state-owned public service company

GAIAOSE S.A.
- Type: Private Anónimi Etaireía
- Industry: Rail transport
- Predecessor: OSE (1970–2001)
- Founded: 3 October 2001; 25 years ago 24 August 2026; 54 days ago (as Hellenic Railway Properties)
- Successor: Greek Railways (rolling stock)
- Headquarters: Siokou 2, 10445 Athens, Greece
- Area served: Greece
- Key people: Konstantinos Kesentes (chair); Panagiotis Balomenos (CEO)
- Products: Railway property management
- Owner: Growthfund
- Website: www.gaiaose.com (in Greek)

Hellenic Railway Properties (Greek: Ελληνικά Σιδηροδρομικά Ακίνητα) (former Gaiaose) is a Greek state-owned property management company that owns and operates real estate of the Greek railway network, such as stations. From 2014 to 2025, it also managed and leased rolling stock to train operating companies, such as Hellenic Train (formerly TrainOSE).

== History ==
HRP was created on 3 October 2001, as a railway real estate subsidiary of the Hellenic Railways Organisation (OSE, now part of Greek Railways). According to Kathimerini in June 2002, GAIAOSE was the second largest landowner (after the Church of Greece), with a total property value of €2 billion (US$1.89 billion). In December 2014, GAIAOSE became the administrator for the railway rolling stock, at the behest of the Greek State. In 2023, 123 older, disused and condemned rolling stock units were set for auction in the first pilot scrapping project, as part of the fleet management program of the Ministry of Infrastructure and Transport.

In October 2025, Greek Railways took over the management of rolling stock from GAIAOSE, leaving GAIAOSE in charge of developing and managing railway real estate, including stations. The transfer of rolling stock from GAIAOSE occurred as part of the restructuring of the Greek railway network in the aftermath of the Tempi train crash in 2023.

== Activity ==
GAIAOSE is responsible for the development and management of railway real estate, including stations: from 17 December 2014 until October 2025, the company also maintained and leased rolling stock, most of which were being used by Hellenic Train (formerly TrainOSE).

== Company management ==
According to the official website, the board of directors of GAIAOSE consists of:

- Konstantinos Kesentes, chair
- Panagiotis Balomenos, chief executive officer
- Nikolaos Zervas
- Martha Kavvatha
- Konstantinos Mangouras
- Athanasios Chondrogiannis
