= Hellenic Train =

Train operator in Greece

Hellenic Train S.A.

- Hellenic Train headquarters in the aftermath of the 2023 train crash and subsequent riots
- Type: Private S.A.
- Industry: Railway transport, logistics and train maintenance
- Predecessor: OSE
- Founded: 1 January 2008; 18 years ago
- Headquarters: Athens, Greece
- Area served: Greece
- Key people: Roberto Rinaudo (CEO); Athanasios Ziliaskopoulos (Chairman of the Board)
- Products: Rail transport, cargo transport, services
- Revenue: €106.29 million (2020)
- Net income: €(9.591) million (2020)
- Owner: Ferrovie dello Stato Italiane
- Number of employees: 1,063 (2020)
- Parent: Ferrovie dello Stato Italiane (100%)
- Divisions: 2021: Athens Suburban Railway; Thessaloniki Regional Railway; Proastiakos Patras; InterCity Express (ICE); InterCity (IC); Regional; Express; Mainline Freight
- Website: Official website

Hellenic Train S.A., formerly TrainOSE S.A. (Greek: ΤραινΟΣΕ Α.Ε.), is a private railway company in Greece which operates passenger and freight trains on OSE lines. Hellenic Train employs train crews, operators and manages most of the rail services throughout the Greek railway network, leasing rolling stock owned by GAIAOSE except for ETR 470 trains.

The company was a subsidiary of the Hellenic Railways Organisation (OSE) until 2008, when it became an independent state-owned company until its privatisation in 2017. TrainOSE was acquired in September 2017 by the Italian national railway company Ferrovie dello Stato Italiane. In 2022 the company rebranded as Hellenic Train.

== History ==
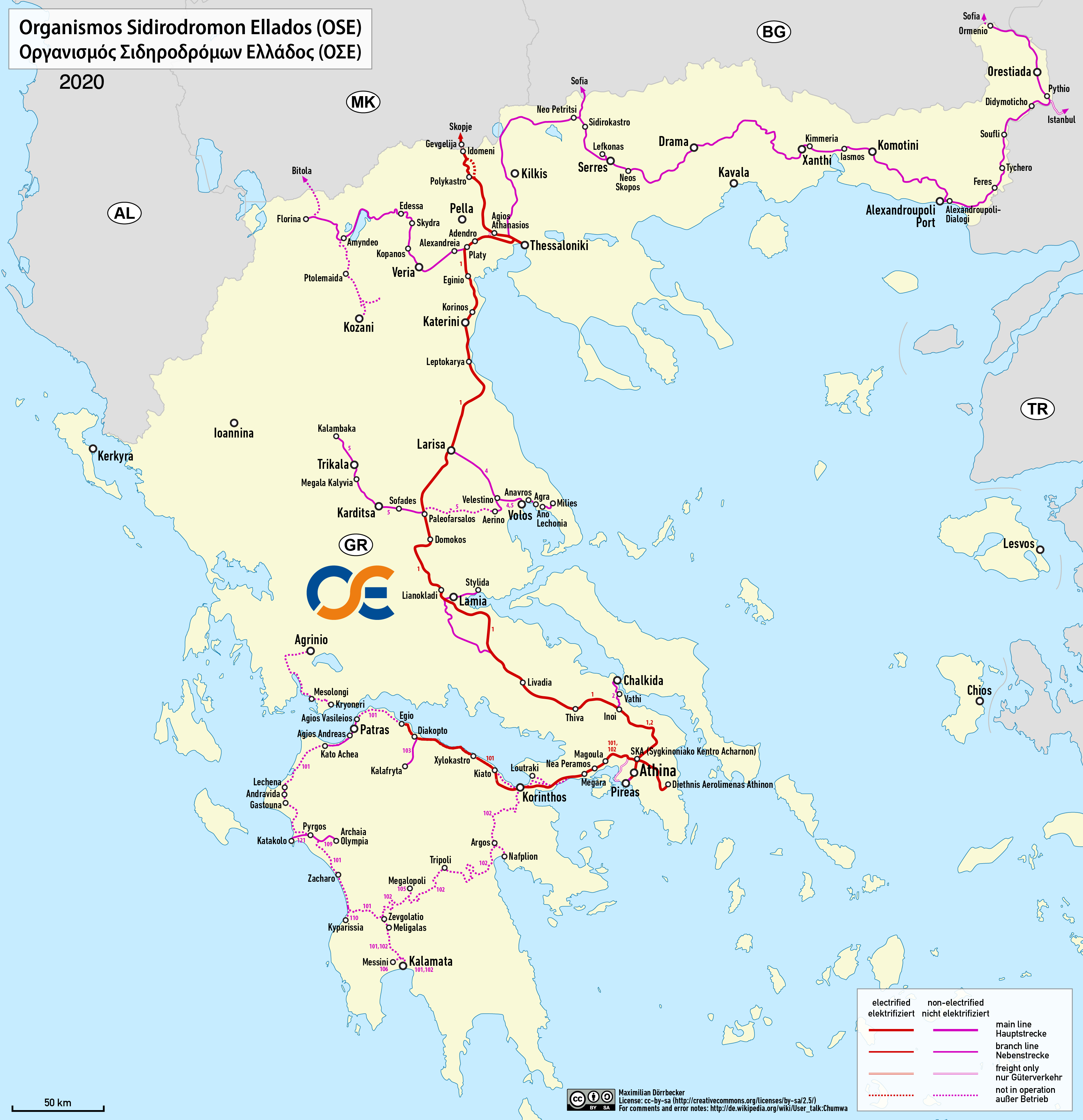
Network of the Hellenic Railways

TRAINOSE Logo, after Privatisation

The company was a subsidiary of the Hellenic Railways Organisation (OSE) and had been since 2005. Before 2005 it had been an in-house service of OSE. In 2008 the company became an independent state-owned company. In 2017 it became a wholly owned subsidiary of the FS Italiane Group.

=== Privatisation ===
In December 2008 the Hellenic Republic Asset Development Fund became the sole shareholder of the corporation. A tendering process for the privatisation of TrainOSE began in July 2013. After a change in government the process was suspended in 2015, before recommencing in January 2016. Ferrovie dello Stato Italiane submitted the only binding offer, GEK Terna and Russian Railways submitted expression of interests but not formal offers.

On 14 July 2016, the privatisation agency accepted Ferrovie dello Stato Italiane's €45 million offer. The sale was completed on 14 September 2017. In 2022, TrainOSE was rebranded as Hellenic Train.

2023 railway disaster

On 28 February 2023, Greece suffered its worst rail disaster when 57 people died in the Tempi train crash, in which a Hellenic Train from Athens collided with a freight train coming from Thessaloniki. Many of the people on the passenger train were students returning from Carnival, while the freight train likely contained heavy steel plates and other construction material; the two trains collided at a combined speed of 160 kilometers per hour (100 mph). The station master reportedly failed to switch the rail line and advised the train driver to ignore a red signal, causing both trains to be switched to the same track. Following the train crash, services were suspended and it was announced that buses would replace train services until safety improved and the new signalling system is completed.

A limited service recommenced in April 2023 and the new signalling system was installed in September 2023. Full Athens to Thessaloniki services recommenced in December 2023.

During the 2025 Tempi protests, the anarchist group Rouvikonas raided the offices of Hellenic Train and raised a banner atop the building reading "Murderers". The group was sued by the company and its 25 members that participated in the raid faced trials but were all found innocent.

On the evening of 11 April 2025 a bomb, planted near the Hellenic Train offices, exploded causing damage to the offices, nearby cars and some nearby buildings. Police cordoned off the area after two Greek media organisations received warning calls that an explosive device would go off within 35 minutes.

== Domestic services ==
Network services of Hellenic Train 2022

=== Mainline passenger services ===
Hellenic Train operates three types of regional rail passenger services which include "Regular" trains (Greek: Κοινή αμαξοστοιχία, regular/common train), Express trains (Greek: Ταχεία) and Intercity (IC) trains.

The regular rail service is the slowest, with trains making frequent stops, while it is also the cheapest available. Express trains are faster trains, making fewer stops in sections served by regular trains. Intercity (IC) trains are the fastest but the most expensive. The needed supplement on Intercity (IC) trains typically doubled or tripled the base fare respectively, but today this is determined more by the different competing forms of transport, mainly air transport. Car transport is also available on night services on the main line from Athens to Thessaloniki.

Passenger accommodation is similar in all classes of long-distance trains. Seat reservation, bar, and restaurant facilities are available on long-distance express and on Intercity (IC) trains.

The numbering of the trains is determined by the type of train. Regular and suburban trains have four-digit train numbers, Express trains have three-digit train numbers, and Intercity (IC) and Intercity trains have two-digit train numbers, preceded by the symbols IC.

The following table summarizes the most recent timetable as of February 2026. The biggest change in effect from previous timetables is the reduction of intercity service between Athens and Thessaloniki due to infrastructure work.

Summary of passenger train services, 2026
| Type | Line | Service | Return trips | Notes |
|---|---|---|---|---|
| Intercity | | Athens-Palaiofarsalos–Larissa- Thessaloniki | 2 | Main railway line linking Athens to Larissa and Thessaloniki. |
| Regional | | Kiato - Aigio | 6 | Connects Athens Suburban Railway to Aigio (future extension to Patras) |
| Regional | G6 | Alexandroupoli–Ormenio | 2 | Regional connection in the Evros prefecture. |
| Suburban (Athens) | A1 | Piraeus–Athens–Athens Airport | 18 | Connects Piraeus port to central Athens and Airport. |
| Suburban (Athens) | A2 | Ano Liosia–Athens Airport | 24 | Connects Athens western suburbs to Airport. |
| Suburban (Athens) | A3 | Athens–Oinoi-Chalkida | 13 | Connects Athens to Chalkida. |
| Suburban (Athens) | A4 | Piraeus-Athens–Corinth-Kiato | 18 | Connects Athens to Kiato (Peloponnese) |
| Suburban (Thessaloniki) | T1 | Thessaloniki–Platy-Larissa | 8 | Connects Thessaloniki to Larissa |
| Suburban (Thessaloniki) | T2 | Thessaloniki-Edessa- Florina | 3 | Connects Thessaloniki to Florina |
| Suburban (Thessaloniki) | T3 | Thessaloniki- Serres–Drama | 3 | Connects Thessaloniki to Drama |
| Suburban (Patras) | P1 | Agios Andreas–Kato Achaia | 17 | Patras Suburban line |
| Suburban (Patras) | P2 | Agios Andreas–Rio - Agios Vasileios | 17 | Patras Suburban line |
| Tourist lines | RT1 | Diakopto–Kalavryta | 3 | Tourist attraction |
| Tourist lines | RT2 | Pelion line | 1 | Tourist attraction |
| Tourist lines | RT3 | Katakolo -Pyrgos–Olympia | 3 | Links ferry terminal of Katakolo to Ancient Olympia |

The railway networks listed below are not mentioned above. More information about the railways can be found here

- Aigio - Patras (under reconstruction, opening 2028)
- Patras – Pyrgos - Kyparissia (suspended in 2011)
- Corinth - Tripoli - Kalamata (suspended in 2011, parts of the line reopening are under discussion)
- Drama - Alexandroupoli (suspended in 2021, currently used by freight trains only, bus connection for passengers)
- Larissa - Volos (suspended following 2023 floods, replaced by bus connection, reopening 2028)
- Palaiofarsalos - Kalambaka (suspended in 2023, replaced by bus connection, reopening 2028)

Estimated time of rail jouneys are noted below:

| Journey | IC / Sub | ICE | Bus |
|---|---|---|---|
| Athens – Leianokladi (Lamia) | 2:24 | | 5:01 |
| Athens – Larisa | 3:27 | 3:05 | 4:46 |
| Athens – Thessaloniki | 5:18 | 3:55 | 7:17 |
| Thessaloniki – Serres | | | 2:43 |
| Thessaloniki – Alexandroupoli | 8:32 | | |
| Thessaloniki – Edessa | 2:34 | | |
| Source: Hellenic Train | 2023 (May) | | |

=== Proastiakos commuter rail service ===
Proastiakos (Greek: Προαστιακός, meaning "suburban") is the name used for the suburban (commuter rail) services of TrainOSE in the Athens, Thessaloniki and Patras areas. Proastiakos was initially an independent subsidiary within the OSE group but has since been merged with TrainOSE S.A. The network infrastructure, even if partly purpose-built for the Proastiakos service, is part of the national railway network of OSE and, as such, is used by the regional rail services, even freight.

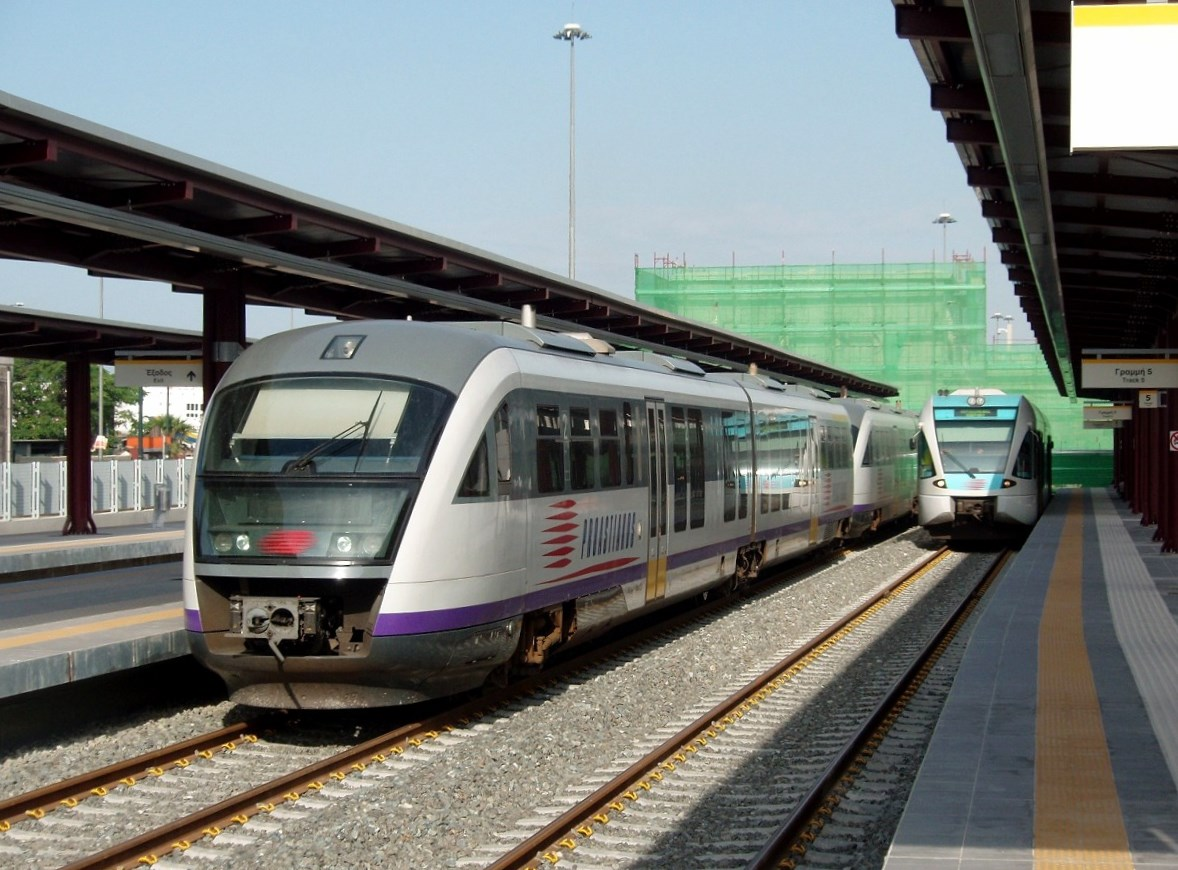
Proastiakos suburban trains at Piraeus railway station

Proastiakos is a relatively new development, with the first service inaugurated for the 2004 Athens Olympic Games, between Athens International Airport and Athens (via Neratziotissa station, close to the Olympic Stadium). The commuter rail services that are currently operated by Proastiakos include the lines on the 'main corridor' of Piraeus–Athens–Ano Liosia, Ano Liosia–Athens International Airport, Ano Liosia–Corinth–Kiato; and between the cities of Thessaloniki and Larissa.

The rolling stock of the Proastiakos commuter rail services include Class 460 Siemens Desiro five-car electric multiple units (EMU), used on the electrified sections of the Ano Liosia–Athens International Airport, Ano Liosia–Corinth–Kiato and Thessaloniki–Larissa lines; while Stadler GTW 2/6 DMUs and MAN-2000 DMUs are used on the non-electrified section between Piraeus–Athens–Ano Liosia.

In Athens, Proastiakos provides connections with Athens Metro (Line 1) at Neratziotissa station, Athens Metro line 2 at Athens Central (Larissa station) and Athens Metro line 3 at Plakentias station; while it is also the only passenger rail service from Athens to Peloponnese, providing connections with the Peloponnese metre gauge network at Corinth and Kiato stations. These regional rail links have expanded the Proastiakos role from being just a pure suburban-commuter rail service.

=== Freight rail ===
As of February 2011 the current regular freight services of TrainOSE consist of:

- A night service from Agios Ioannis Renti in Athens to the Thessaloniki marshalling yard.
- A night service from Thessaloniki yard to Agios Ioannis Renti.
- A night service from Agios Ioannis Renti to Agioi Anargyroi container unloading facility and back.
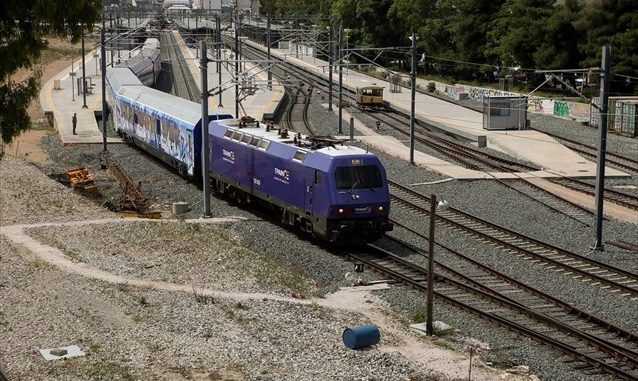
  Athens, 2020 TRAINO

Other irregular national and international freight services also exist.

== International services ==
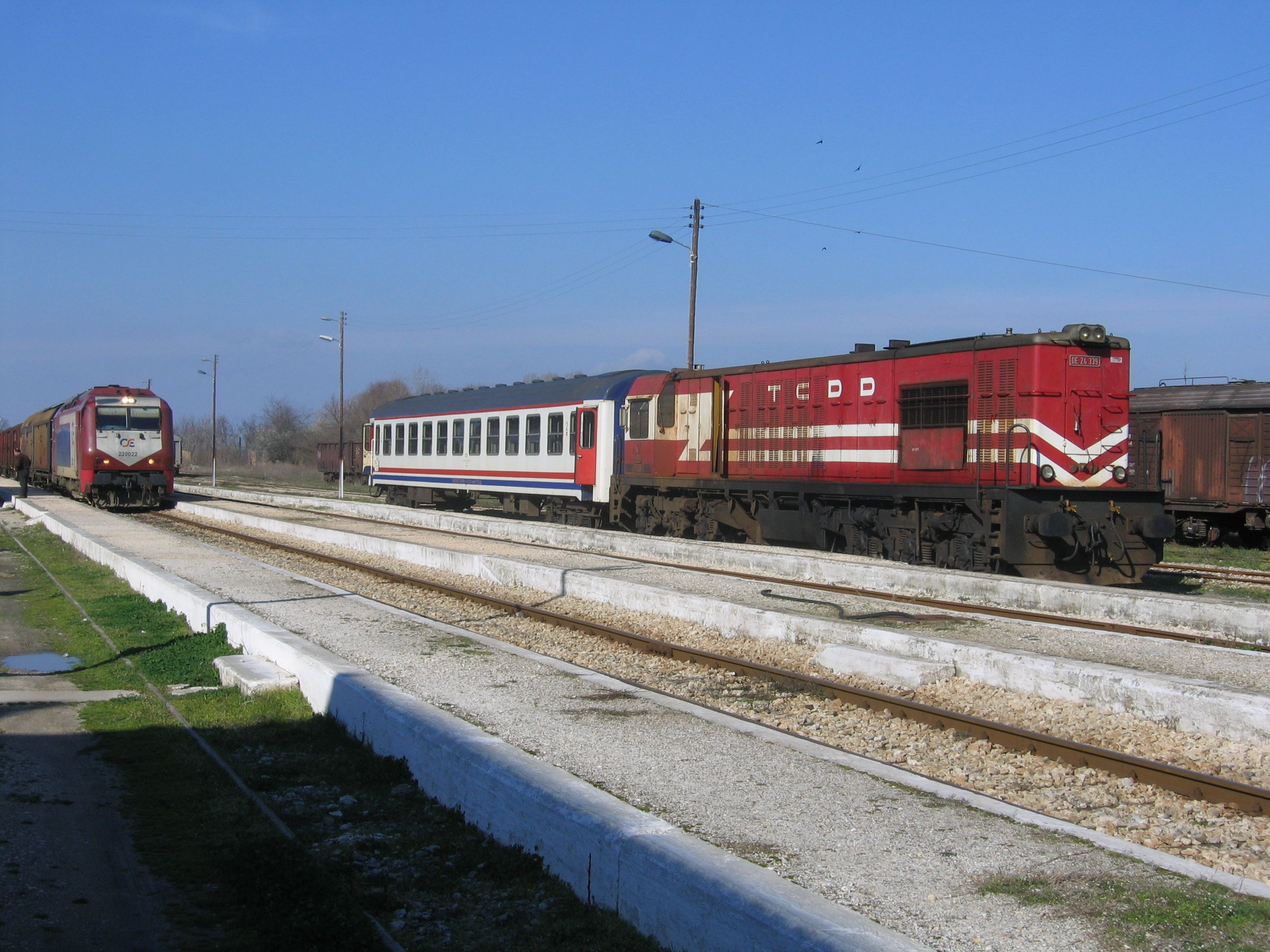
A TCDD passenger train next to a Greek freight train at Pythion station, where OSE's network connects to that of TCDD (2007)

On 13 February 2011, due to the Greek financial crisis and subsequent budget cuts by the Greek government, all international services were suspended. The Greek railway system used to connect with the railways of neighbouring countries Bulgaria at Promahonas (Koulata) and at Ormenio, with Turkey at Pythio and with the railways of North Macedonia at Idomeni.

The passenger services from Greece that ran to neighbouring countries until February 2011 were:

- Thessaloniki – Skopje – Belgrade
- Thessaloniki – Sofia – Bucharest
- Thessaloniki – Istanbul (Friendship Express)
- Athens – Sofia

However, in May 2014 some international services were re-introduced on the following lines:

- Thessaloniki – Skopje – Belgrade
- Thessaloniki – Sofia – Bucharest

All international services were suspended again in 2020 due to the Coronavirus pandemic, and remained suspended afterwards, meaning Greece has no international railway connections at present.

In 2024 it was announced that infrastructure would be upgraded so that a high speed rail would connect Budapest to Athens via Belgrade, Skopje and Thessaloniki, linking Greece with Central Europe. However, this will take many years to complete. As the Greek section from Athens to Thessaloniki is already complete, the section from Thessaloniki to the border at Idomeni would need to be upgraded.

== Rolling stock ==
The Hellenic Train rolling stock, which until the end of 2017 was owned by OSE, was valued and then transferred almost in its entirety (except for some museum vehicles) by OSE to the Greek State in exchange for an equal reduction of OSE's debt to the Greek State. GAIAOSE was appointed administrator of the rolling stock of the Greek State, which leases it to TRAINOSE for a price. In addition, TRAINOSE leases rolling stock to Rail Cargo Logistics (a member of Goldair), under a special contract. However, the arrival of rolling stock in Greece for use by TRAINOSE's parent company Trenitalia has been reported to take place in the context of the company's investments. 5 Pendolino trains are expected to arrive in Greece in late 2020 after a delay due to the global pandemic.

In 2019, It was decided that these units would be used on the Athens – Thessaloniki line. Units will be converted for use in Greece, the existing 3 kV DC equipment is to be replaced with 25 kV 50 Hz equipment and they will be fitted with ETCS onboard equipment. In August 2018, a similar ETR.485 unit transferred to Greece for testing purposes, in anticipation of the ETR 470 fleet's arrival, but because it was not designed for the Greek network, it was decided instead to launch the ETR 470, which were originally expected to come in 2019, with the completion of the electrification and testing of the ETCS. However, in February 2020, with the Hellenic Train depot not yet ready to receive them delivery was delayed. Instead of arriving in the summer of 2020, delivery was postponed until the end of 2020 or the beginning of 2021. The delivery was delayed even further, so the first unit is scheduled to arrive on 18 January 2021 in Thessaloniki, via a route from Piacenza. The remaining units were to gradually arrive and the first route was scheduled to take place on 25 March 2021, according to the statements of Hellenic Train's managing director, Filippos Tsalidis. Five modified Frecciargento ETR 470 units eventually entered service on the Athens-Thessaloniki route in May 2022. Hybrid bimode rolling stock has also been considered.

In December 2025, Alstom received a €393 million order from Hellenic Train for 23 Coradia Stream EMUs that would be constructed at the Savigliano manufacturing site. The contract is part of Hellenic Train's aims of modernization and improvement of the Greek railway network, which includes infrastructure as well as rolling stock supply. The contract also includes associated maintenance services over a period of 10 years on Alstom's behalf. 11 of the units would be intended for commuter rail usage in and around the areas of Athens and Thessaloniki, with the remaining 12 intended for longer-distance intercity services. The first units are expected to enter service within the second quarter of 2027, with a provisional test train from Bulgaria being tested across the Greek railway network during spring 2026. In June 2026, Deputy Minister of Transport Konstantinos Kyranakis revealed that the order had been raised from 23 to 25 trainsets, with two additional sets entering service ahead of schedule within summer of 2026. In July 2026, the first of two Hitachi Rail Italy HTR 312/412 "Blues" tri-mode trainsets arrived in Thessaloniki to be tested across the Greek network, ahead of the Coradia Stream order.

== See also ==
- Budapest–Belgrade–Skopje–Athens railway
- Hellenic Railways Organisation
- Proastiakos
- Rail transport in Greece
- Tempi train crash
