= Kilkis railway station =

Station in Central Macedonia, Greece

Κιλκίς Kilkis

General information
- Location: Kristoni 611 00, Greece; Kilkis; Greece
- Coordinates: 40°57′30″N 22°51′25″E
- Owner: GAIAOSE
- Line: Thessaloniki–Alexandroupolis railway
- Platforms: 3
- Tracks: 4
- Train operators: Hellenic Train

Construction
- Structure type: at-grade
- Platform levels: 1

Other information
- Status: unstaffed
- Website: http://www.ose.gr/en/

History
- Opened: 1900
- Electrified: No

Services
Preceding station	Regional Rail	Following station
Pedino towards Thessaloniki	Line T3	Metalliko towards Drama
Former and suspended services
Preceding station	Hellenic Train	Following station
Gallikos towards Thessaloniki	InterCity Thessaloniki–Alexandroupoli Fast train	Chersos towards Alexandroupoli
Pedino towards Thessaloniki	InterCity Thessaloniki–Alexandroupoli	Metalliko towards Alexandroupoli
Pedino towards Thessaloniki	InterCity Thessaloniki–Serres	Metalliko towards Serres
Preceding station	Turkish State Railways	Following station
Thessaloniki Terminus	Friendship Express	Rodopoli towards Istanbul
Location
- Location within Greece

Kilkis railway station (Greek: Σιδηροδρομικός Σταθμός Κιλκίς, romanized: Sidirodromikós stathmós Kilkís) is a railway station in the small town of Kristoni, that serves the nearby town of Kilkis, both in Kilkis in Central Macedonia, Greece. The station is unstaffed but has waiting rooms available and a taxi rank

== History ==
The station opened in 1900 as part of the Salonica Monastir railway, built by the Enotikos Thessalonica-Istanbul Company. The station, along with the line west, was annexed by Greece on 18 October 1912 during the First Balkan War. On 17 October 1925, The Greek government purchased the Greek sections of the former Salonica Monastir railway, and the railway became part of the Hellenic State Railways, with the remaining section north of Florina seeded to Yugoslavia. On 1 January 1971, the station and most of the Greek rail infrastructure were transferred to the Hellenic Railways Organisation S.A., a state-owned corporation. Freight traffic declined sharply when the state-imposed monopoly of OSE for the transport of agricultural products and fertilisers ended in the early 1990s. Many small stations of the network with little passenger traffic were closed down.

In 2001 the infrastructure element of OSE was created, known as GAIAOSE; it would henceforth be responsible for the maintenance of stations, bridges and other elements of the network, as well as the leasing and the sale of railway assists. In 2003, OSE launched "Proastiakos SA", as a subsidiary to serve the operation of the suburban network in the urban complex of Athens during the 2004 Olympic Games. In 2005, TrainOSE was created as a brand within OSE to concentrate on rail services and passenger interface.

On 9 September 2007, the station reopened. In 2008, all Proastiakos services were transferred from OSE to TrainOSE. In 2009, with the Greek debt crisis unfolding OSE's Management was forced to reduce services across the network. Timetables were cut back, and routes closed as the government-run entity attempted to reduce overheads. Services from Thessaloniki and Alexandroupolis were reduced from six to just two trains a day, reducing the reliability of services and passenger numbers. In 2017 OSE's passenger transport sector was privatised as TrainOSE, currently, a wholly owned subsidiary of Ferrovie dello Stato Italiane infrastructure, including stations, remained under the control of OSE. Since 2020, the station has been served by the Thessaloniki Regional Railway (formerly the Suburban Railway). In July 2022, the station began being served by Hellenic Train, the rebranded TranOSE

In August 2025, the Greek Ministry of Infrastructure and Transport confirmed the creation of a new body, Greek Railways (Greek: Σιδηρόδρομοι Ελλάδος, romanized: Ellinikí Sidiródromi Monoprósopi) to assume responsibility for rail infrastructure, planning, modernisation projects, and rolling stock across Greece. Previously, these functions were divided among several state-owned entities: OSE, which managed infrastructure; ERGOSÉ, responsible for modernisation projects; and GAIAOSÉ, which owned stations, buildings, and rolling stock. OSE had overseen both infrastructure and operations until its vertical separation in 2005. Rail safety has been identified as a key priority. The merger follows the July approval of a Parliamentary Bill to restructure the national railway system, a direct response to the Tempi accident of February 2023, in which 43 people died after a head-on collision.

== Services ==
As of 12 May 2025, Line 3 of the Thessaloniki Regional Railway calls at this station: service is currently limited, with two trains per day to Thessaloniki (trains 1635 and 3633), one train per day to Serres (3632), and one train per day to Drama (1634, via Serres).

It was also served by two long-distance trains between Thessaloniki and Alexandroupolis, as well as the Friendship Express between Thessaloniki and Sirkeci in Istanbul (from July 2005 and February 2011): both services are currently suspended.
