= Rodopoli railway station =

Railway Station in Thrace, Greece

Ροδόπολη Rodopolis
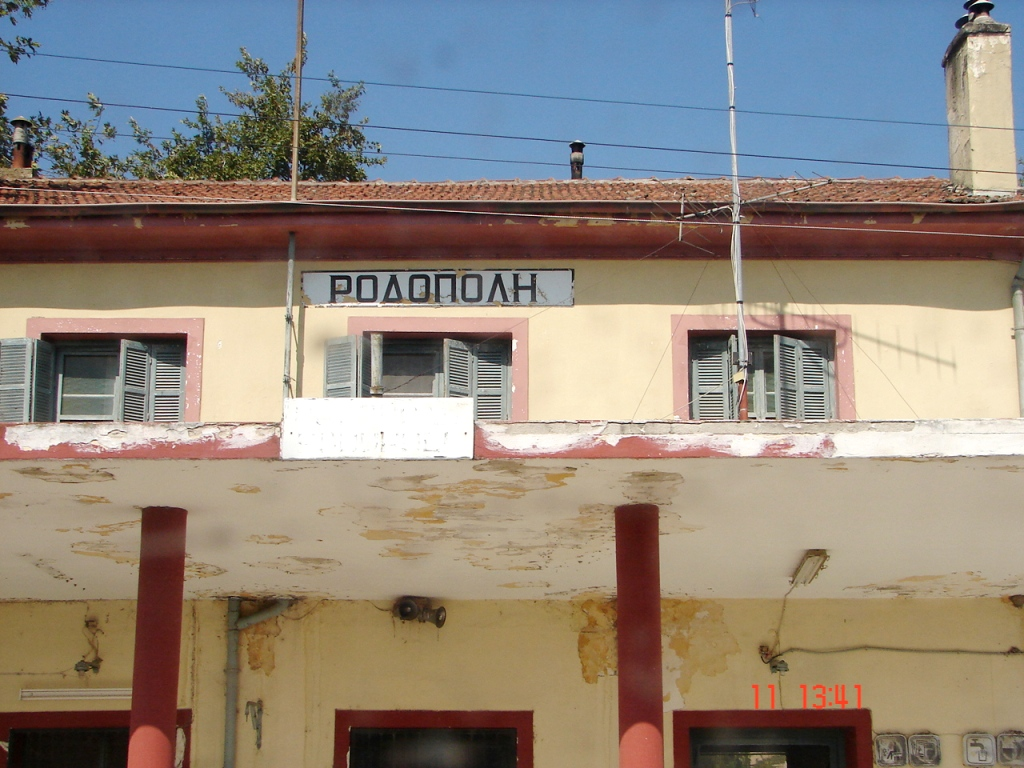
- Rodopoli railway station, September 2007

General information
- Location: Rodopoli 620 53; Serres; Greece
- Coordinates: 41°15′33″N 22°59′57″E
- Owner: GAIAOSE
- Line: Thessaloniki–Alexandroupolis railway
- Platforms: 3
- Tracks: 6
- Train operators: Hellenic Train
- Connections: Proastiakos

Construction
- Structure type: at-grade
- Depth: 1
- Platform levels: 1
- Parking: Yes
- Cycle facilities: No

Other information
- Status: Unstaffed
- Website: http://www.ose.gr/en/

History
- Opened: 1900
- Electrified: No

Services
Preceding station	Regional Rail	Following station
Kalochori towards Thessaloniki	Line T3	Livadia towards Drama
Suspended services
Preceding station	Hellenic Train	Following station
Kastanoussa towards Thessaloniki	InterCity Thessaloniki–Alexandroupoli	Livadia Kerkinis towards Alexandroupoli
Kastanoussa towards Thessaloniki	InterCity Thessaloniki–Serres	Livadia Kerkinis towards Serres
Preceding station	Turkish State Railways	Following station
Kilkis towards Thessaloniki	Friendship Express	Serres towards Istanbul
Location
- Location within Greece

Rodopoli railway station (Greek: Σιδηροδρομικός Σταθμός Ροδόπολης, romanized: Sidirodromikós Stathmós Rodópolis) is a railway station that serves the community of Rodopoli, in Serres in East Macedonia and Thrace, Greece. The station is located close to the town center and within the settlement limits. The station building (as of 2021) is unstaffed.

== History ==
The station opened in 1900. Known before 1927 as Poroia (Greek: Ποροία) the settlement had been annexed by Greece on 18 October 1912 during the First Balkan War. On 17 October 1925, The Greek government purchased the Greek sections of the former Salonica Monastir railway and the railway became part of the Hellenic State Railways, with the remaining section north of Florina seeded to Yugoslavia. In 1970 OSE became the legal successor to the SEK, taking over responsibilities for most of Greece's rail infrastructure. On 1 January 1971, the station and most of Greek rail infrastructure where transferred to the Hellenic Railways Organisation S.A., a state-owned corporation. Freight traffic declined sharply when the state-imposed monopoly of OSE for the transport of agricultural products and fertilisers ended in the early 1990s. Many small stations of the network with little passenger traffic were closed down.

In 2001 the infrastructure element of OSE was created, known as GAIAOSE; it would henceforth be responsible for the maintenance of stations, bridges and other elements of the network, as well as the leasing and the sale of railway assists. In 2003, OSE launched "Proastiakos SA", as a subsidiary to serve the operation of the suburban network in the urban complex of Athens during the 2004 Olympic Games. In 2005, TrainOSE was created as a brand within OSE to concentrate on rail services and passenger interface. On 9 September 2007, the station reopened. In 2008, all Proastiakos services were transferred from OSE to TrainOSE.

In 2009, with the Greek debt crisis unfolding OSE's Management was forced to reduce services across the network. Timetables were cutback, routes closed, and stations left abandoned as the government-run entity attempted to reduce overheads. Services from Thessaloniki and Alexandroupolis were cut back from six to just two trains a day, reducing the reliability of services and passenger numbers. In 2017 OSE's passenger transport sector was privatised as TrainOSE, currently, a wholly owned subsidiary of Ferrovie dello Stato Italiane infrastructure, including stations, remained under the control of OSE. Since 2020, the station is served by the Thessaloniki Regional Railway (formerly the Suburban Railway). In July 2022, the station began being served by Hellenic Train, the rebranded TranOSE

In August 2025, the Greek Ministry of Infrastructure and Transport confirmed the creation of a new body, Greek Railways (Greek: Σιδηρόδρομοι Ελλάδος, romanized: Ellinikí Sidiródromi Monoprósopi) to assume responsibility for rail infrastructure, planning, modernisation projects, and rolling stock across Greece. Previously, these functions were divided among several state-owned entities: OSE, which managed infrastructure; ERGOSÉ, responsible for modernisation projects; and GAIAOSÉ, which owned stations, buildings, and rolling stock. OSE had overseen both infrastructure and operations until its vertical separation in 2005. Rail safety has been identified as a key priority. The merger follows the July approval of a Parliamentary Bill to restructure the national railway system, a direct response to the Tempi accident of February 2023, in which 43 people died after a head-on collision.

== Facilities ==
The station is still housed in the original 20th-century brick-built station building. As of (2020) the station is slightly rundown. It is unstaffed. There is no footbridge over the lines, though passengers can walk across the rails and not wheelchair accessible. The station is also not equipped with digital display screens or timetable poster boards. However, a cafe/restaurant is located in an adjoining building, but still within the station limits. A bus stop with local bus services can be found in front of the station building. The station has a junction.

== Services ==
As of 12 May 2025, Line 3 of the Thessaloniki Regional Railway calls at this station: service is currently limited, with two trains per day to Thessaloniki (trains 1635 and 3633), one train per day to Serres (3632), and one train per day to Drama (1634, via Serres).

It was also served by two long-distance trains between Thessaloniki and Alexandroupolis, as well as the Friendship Express between Thessaloniki and Sirkeci in Istanbul (from July 2005 and February 2011): both services are currently suspended.

== Station layout ==
L Ground/Concourse	Customer service	Tickets/Exits
Level; Ε1
Level; Ε1	Side platform, doors on the right/left
Level; Ε1	Platform 1	T3 towards Thessaloniki ←
Level; Ε1	Island platform, doors on the right/left
Level; Ε1	Platform 2	T3 towards Serres →
Level; Ε1	Island platform, doors on the right/left
Level; Ε1	Platform 3	towards Alexandroupoli (Livadia Kerkinis) →
