= Nikiforos railway station =

Railway station in Greece

Νικηφόρος Nikiforos
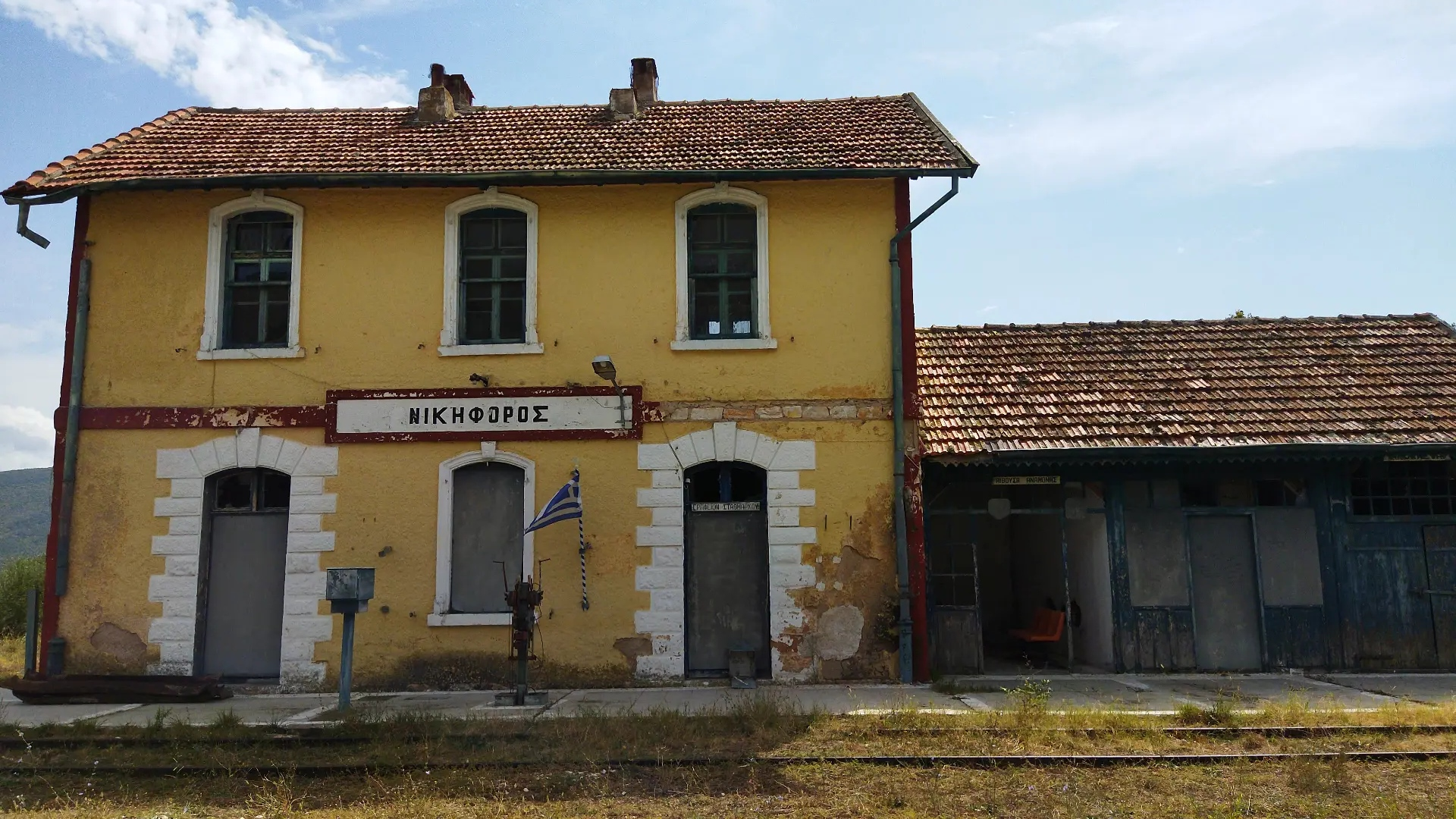
- Nikiforos railway station buildings, September 2021

General information
- Location: Nikiforos 660 37; Drama; Greece
- Coordinates: 41°10′04″N 24°18′42″E
- Owner: GAIAOSE
- Line: Thessaloniki–Alexandroupoli railway
- Platforms: 3 (1 disused)
- Tracks: 6
- Train operators: Hellenic Train

Construction
- Structure type: at-grade
- Depth: 1
- Platform levels: 1
- Cycle facilities: Unknown

Other information
- Status: Unstaffed
- Website: http://www.ose.gr/en/

History
- Opened: 1895
- Electrified: No
Former services
| Preceding station | Hellenic Train | Following station |
|---|---|---|
| Drama towards Thessaloniki | InterCity Thessaloniki–Alexandroupoli Fast train | Paranesti towards Alexandroupoli |
| Drama towards Thessaloniki | InterCity Thessaloniki–Alexandroupoli | Platania towards Alexandroupoli |
Location
- Location within Greece

Nikiforos railway station (Greek: Σιδηροδρομικός Σταθμός Νικηφόρου, romanized: Sidirodromikós Stathmós Nikiforos) is a railway station that serves the Northern Greek village of Nikiforos, in Drama in East Macedonia and Thrace, Greece. The station is located within the settlement limits. The neoclassical station building (as of 2021) is unstaffed and in a rundown state. The station building and some of its auxiliary buildings have been classified as monuments.

== History ==
Opened in June 1895 on what was the Société du Chemin de Fer Ottoman Jonction Salonique-Constantinople JSC, build to connect Thessaloniki and Alexandroupoli. The initial phase of its construction was in 1894, when the passenger station and the adjacent office building were built, as well as the engine room, the water tower, the maintenance house, and the engine room warehouse. In 1896 the company inaugurated the line thus connecting Thessaloniki with Dedeagats (Alexandroupolis), and consequently with Istanbul. During this period, Northern Greece and the southern Balkans were still under Ottoman rule. Drama was annexed by Greece on 18 October 1912 during the First Balkan War. The station building was built in 1916 following a decision of the French headquarters in Thessaloniki, with Serbian soldiers worked on the construction of the building. In May 1918, the station was bombed by the German air force. During the interwar period, the car depot, the engine room office building, the foreman's house, the sub-engine room dormitory, the military warehouse and the turntable were built. Following the failed Italian invasion, on 30 April 1941, Bulgaria occupied territory between the Struma River and a line of demarcation running through Alexandroupoli and Svilengrad west of the Maritsa river, occupying the cities of Alexandroupoli (Bulgarian: Дедеагач, romanized: Dedeagach), Komotini (Гюмюрджина, Gyumyurdzhina), Serres (Сяр, Syar), Xanthi (Ксанти), Drama (Драма) and Kavala (Кавала), which it had lost to Greece in 1918.

During the Bulgarian occupation (1941–44), it was run as part of the Bulgarian state railways. In September 1944, following Bulgarian capitulation, it was handed over to the Greek state in poor condition. Newer additions were created after 1950, such as engine room workshops, two barns, and new fuel depots. In 1970 OSE became the legal successor to the SEK, taking over responsibilities for most of Greece's rail infrastructure. On 1 January 1971, the station and most of the Greek rail infrastructure were transferred to the Hellenic Railways Organisation S.A., a state-owned corporation. Freight traffic declined sharply when the state-imposed monopoly of OSE for the transport of agricultural products and fertilisers ended in the early 1990s. Many small stations of the network with little passenger traffic were closed down.

In 2001 the infrastructure element of OSE was created, known as GAIAOSE; it would henceforth be responsible for the maintenance of stations, bridges and other elements of the network, as well as the leasing and the sale of railway assists. In 2005, TrainOSE was created as a brand within OSE to concentrate on rail services and passenger interface. In 2009, with the Greek debt crisis unfolding OSE's Management was forced to reduce services across the network. Timetables were cutback and routes closed, as the government-run entity attempted to reduce overheads. In 2016, plans were outlined for the restoration of the station. In 2017 OSE's passenger transport sector was privatised as TrainOSE, currently a wholly owned subsidiary of Ferrovie dello Stato Italiane infrastructure, including stations, remained under the control of OSE. In the summer of 2019, members of the Bristol Scout 1264 team, filmmakers and historians from England met in the wider region of Eastern Macedonia. From 7–9 September 2019, Drama hosted the 1st International Meeting in Drama for performance art at the station. In 2020, questions were raised over accessibility at the station during a session of parliament. In July 2022, the station began being served by Hellenic Train, the rebranded TranOSE.

== Facilities ==
The station is still housed in the original two-story 19th-century stone-built building; however, the buildings are rundown and almost abandoned. As of (2020) the station is unstaffed, with no staffed booking office; however, there waiting rooms. There is no footbridge over the lines, though passengers can walk across the rails; it is however not wheelchair accessible. The station is not equipped with no digital display screens or timetable poster boards. The station has no toilet facilities, as a result, the station is currently little more than an unstaffed halt. Infrequent buses call at the station, at a stop outside the forecourt.

== Services ==
It is served by two long-distance trains betweenThessaloniki and Alexandroupolis.

(As of 2020) with the traffic restriction measures, the Drama - Alexandroupolis routes and vice versa, as well as the Drama - Thessaloniki routes and vice versa, have been suspended.
