= Nea Filadelfeia railway station =

Railway station in Greece

Νέας Φιλαδέλφειας Nea Filadelfeia

General information
- Location: Nea Filadelfeia 611 00, Thessaloniki (regional unit); Greece
- Coordinates: 40°47′48″N 22°50′56″E
- Owner: GAIAOSE
- Line: Thessaloniki–Alexandroupolis railway
- Platforms: 3
- Tracks: 4
- Train operators: Hellenic Train

Construction
- Structure type: at-grade
- Depth: 1
- Platform levels: 2
- Parking: Yes
- Cycle facilities: No

Other information
- Website: http://www.ose.gr/en/

History
- Opened: 1924
- Rebuilt: 2000
- Electrified: No
- Former names: Naresh

Services
Preceding station	Regional Rail	Following station
Thessaloniki Terminus	Line T3	Gallikos towards Drama
Suspended services
Preceding station	Hellenic Train	Following station
Thessaloniki Terminus	InterCity Thessaloniki–Alexandroupoli	Gallikos towards Alexandroupoli
Thessaloniki Terminus	InterCity Thessaloniki–Serres	Gallikos towards Serres
Location
- Location within Greece

Nea Filadelfeia railway station (Greek: Σιδηροδρομικός Σταθμός Νέας Φιλαδέλφειας, romanized: Sidirodromikós stathmós Nea Filadelfeia) is a railway station that servers the community of Nea Filadelfeia, in Thessaloniki regional unit in Central Macedonia, Greece. The station is located just east of the settlement but still within the settlement limits. The station (as of 2021) is unstaffed, with the station buildings abandoned and left to decay.

== History ==
The station opened in 1924 in Nea Filadelfeia. Known before 1927 as Naresh (Greek: Νάρες), the settlement had been annexed by Greece on 18 October 1912 during the First Balkan War. On 17 October 1925 The Greek government purchased the Greek sections of the former Salonica Monastir railway, and the railway became part of the Hellenic State Railways, with the remaining section north of Florina seeded to Yugoslavia. In 1970 OSE became the legal successor to the SEK, taking over responsibilities for most of Greece's rail infrastructure. On 1 January 1971, the station and most of the Greek rail infrastructure were transferred to the Hellenic Railways Organisation S.A., a state-owned corporation. Freight traffic declined sharply when the state-imposed monopoly of OSE for the transport of agricultural products and fertilisers ended in the early 1990s. Many small stations of the network with little passenger traffic were closed down.

In around 2000, the station was rebuilt, with new signalling and points facilitating the resighting of the station. The old station building now sits set back from the new higher platform. In 2001 the infrastructure element of OSE was created, known as GAIAOSE; it would henceforth be responsible for the maintenance of stations, bridges and other elements of the network, as well as the leasing and the sale of railway assists. In 2003, OSE launched "Proastiakos SA", as a subsidiary to serve the operation of the suburban network in the urban complex of Athens during the 2004 Olympic Games. In 2005, TrainOSE was created as a brand within OSE to concentrate on rail services and passenger interface.

On 9 September 2007, the station reopened. In 2008, all Proastiakos services were transferred from OSE to TrainOSE. In 2009, with the Greek debt crisis unfolding OSE's Management was forced to reduce services across the network. Timetables were cut back, and routes closed as the government-run entity attempted to reduce overheads. Services from Thessaloniki and Alexandroupolis were cut back from six to just two trains a day, reducing the reliability of services and passenger numbers. In 2017 OSE's passenger transport sector was privatised as TrainOSE, currently, a wholly owned subsidiary of Ferrovie dello Stato Italiane infrastructure, including stations, remained under the control of OSE. Since 2020, the station has been served by the Thessaloniki Regional Railway (formerly the Suburban Railway).

In August 2025, the Greek Ministry of Infrastructure and Transport confirmed the creation of a new body, Greek Railways (Greek: Σιδηρόδρομοι Ελλάδος, romanized: Ellinikí Sidiródromi Monoprósopi) to assume responsibility for rail infrastructure, planning, modernisation projects, and rolling stock across Greece. Previously, these functions were divided among several state-owned entities: OSE, which managed infrastructure; ERGOSÉ, responsible for modernisation projects; and GAIAOSÉ, which owned stations, buildings, and rolling stock. OSE had overseen both infrastructure and operations until its vertical separation in 2005. Rail safety has been identified as a key priority. The merger follows the July approval of a Parliamentary Bill to restructure the national railway system, a direct response to the Tempi accident of February 2023, in which 43 people died after a head-on collision.

== Facilities ==
The station is still housed in the original 20th-century brick-built station building. As of (2020) the station is unstaffed, with no staffed booking office or waiting rooms. Access to the platforms is via a footbridge over the lines, with wheelchair accessible by elevator. The platforms have shelters with seating; however, there are no digital display screens or timetable poster boards. However, infrequent buses do call the station.

== Services ==
As of 12 May 2025, Line 3 of the Thessaloniki Regional Railway calls at this station: service is currently limited, with two trains per day to Thessaloniki (trains 1635 and 3633), one train per day to Serres (3632), and one train per day to Drama (1634, via Serres).
