= Holocaust Museum of Greece =

- Μουσείο Ολοκαυτώματος Ελλάδος

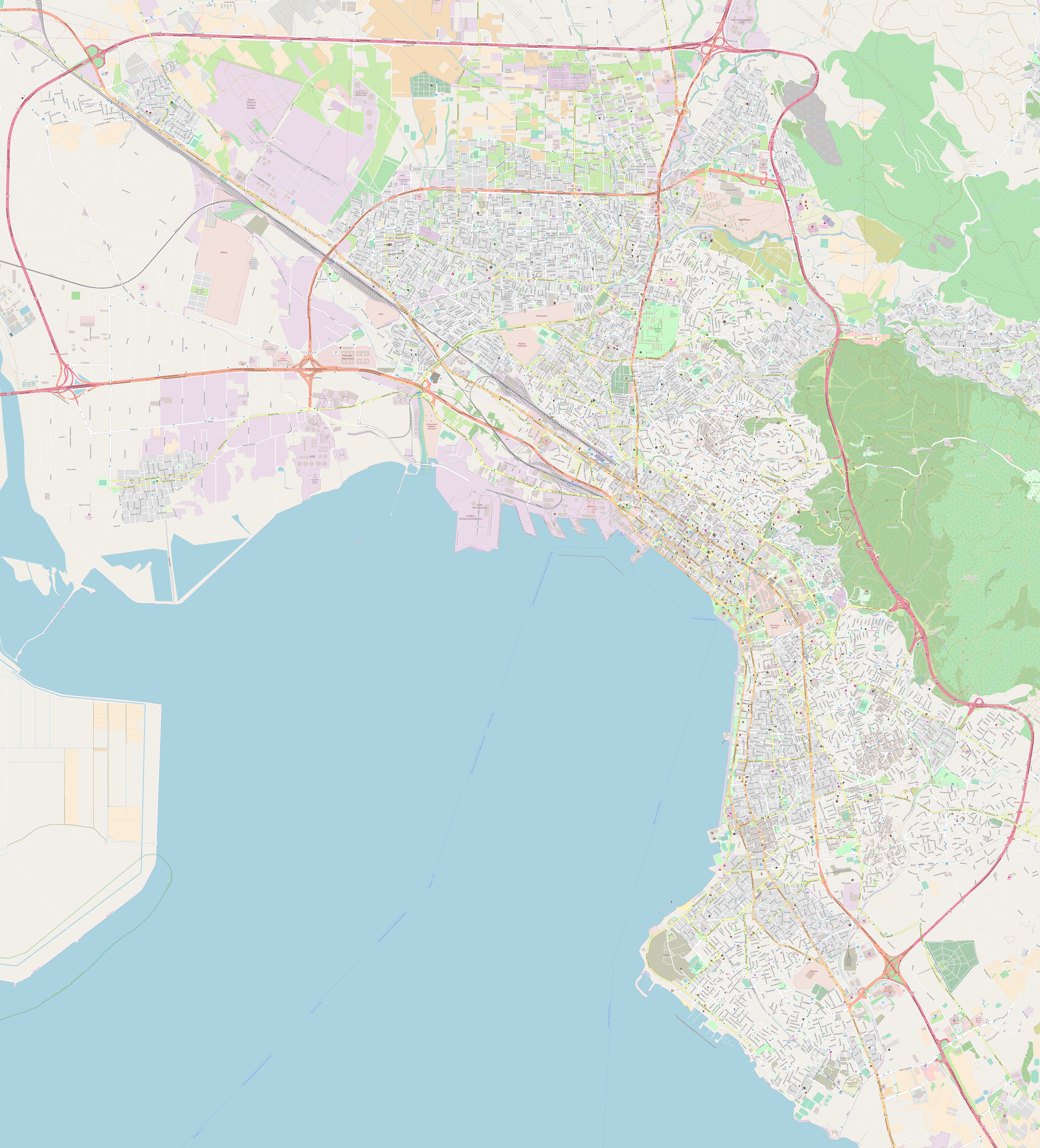
- Location within Thessaloniki Holocaust Museum of Greece (Greece)
- Location: Thessaloniki, Greece
- Coordinates: 40.644°N 22.918°E
- Type: Holocaust museum Human rights museum
- Architects: (Germany) Heide & von Beckerath (Israel) Ek a Efrat–Kowalsky
- Website: Official website

The Holocaust Museum of Greece (Greek: Μουσείο Ολοκαυτώματος Ελλάδος, romanized: Mouseío Olokaftómatos Elládos), officially the Holocaust Memorial Museum & Educational Center of Greece on Human Rights, is an under construction museum on The Holocaust in Thessaloniki, Greece.

== Background ==
In 1942 the German forces started implementing the Nuremberg Laws in the city and ordered male Jews to register at Eleftherias Square, where they were publicly tortured and humiliated before being forced into labour. A Jewish ghetto was established near the (now former) train station. In 1943 the city's 56,000 Jews were deported, by use of 19 Holocaust trains, to Auschwitz and Bergen-Belsen concentration camps, where 43,000 – 49,000 of them were murdered. The train journey from Thessaloniki to the concentration camps was the longest of all Holocaust trains, and Jews were forced to buy a ticket.

Between the 15th and early 20th centuries, Thessaloniki was the only city in Europe where Jews were a majority of the population. However, only 2,000 Jews returned after the war and less than 1,000 remain today. Overall, 80,000 Greek Jews, or 85% of the country's total Jewish population, were murdered in the Holocaust.

== Construction and funding ==
Its construction was proposed in 2016 and is partly funded by Germany (€10 million), the Stavros Niarchos Foundation, with support from the Municipality of Thessaloniki and mayor Yiannis Boutaris. The total construction cost is estimated at €25 million ($29.57 million). The foundation stone was placed on 30 January 2018.

In 2022, Albert Bourla, a native of Thessaloniki and CEO of Pfizer, directed his $1 million award from the Genesis Prize for his leadership in delivering the Pfizer–BioNTech COVID-19 vaccine towards the Holocaust Museum of Greece and Holocaust education, with the particular emphasis on the fate of Greek Jewish community.

In December 2023, the municipality of Thessaloniki approved the construction of the museum. The project is scheduled to be complete in 2028.

== Location ==
The site chosen for the museum in the city is on an open plaza located at the endpoint of the rail lines and extends the walkway along Thessaloniki’s seashore, connecting the city’s harbor, the historic White Tower and the old railway station, which was used during the war for the deportation of nearly 50,000 Jews.

== See also ==
- History of the Jews in Greece
- History of the Jews in Thessaloniki
- Jewish Museum of Thessaloniki
- List of Holocaust memorials and museums
