= Paranesti railway station =

Railway station in Greece

Παρανέστι Paranesti
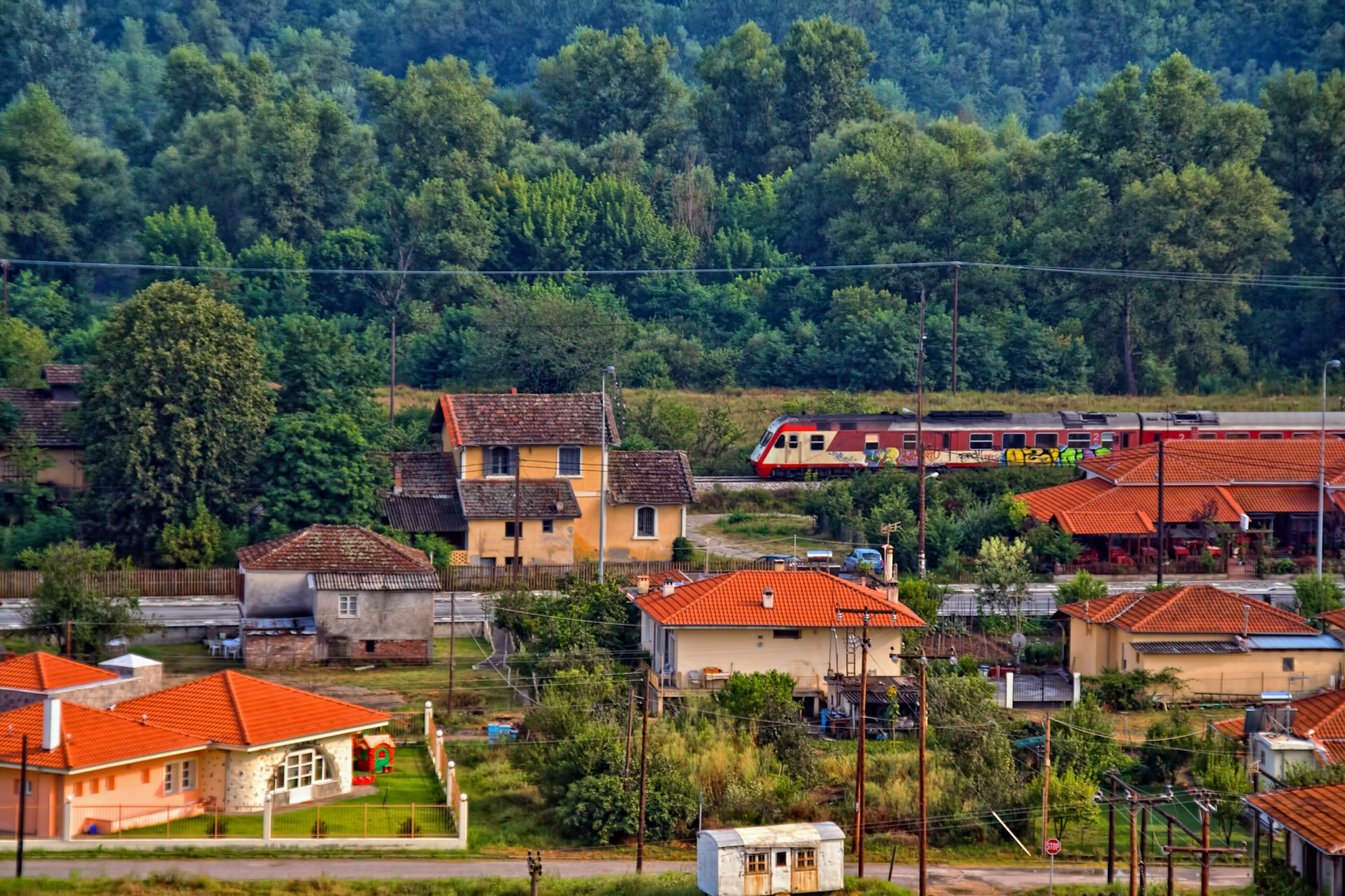
- The north side of the station, 2011

General information
- Location: Paranesti 660 35, Drama; Greece
- Coordinates: 41°15′57″N 24°30′06″E
- Owner: GAIAOSE
- Line: Thessaloniki–Alexandroupolis railway
- Platforms: 3 (1 disused)
- Tracks: 6
- Train operators: Hellenic Train

Construction
- Structure type: at-grade
- Depth: 1
- Platform levels: 1
- Parking: Yes

Other information
- Status: Unstaffed
- Website: http://www.ose.gr/en/

History
- Opened: 1895
- Electrified: No

Services
Preceding station	Hellenic Train	Following station
Drama Terminus	G5 Drama-Alexandroupoli	Stavroupoli towards Alexandroupolis
Former/Suspended services
Preceding station	Hellenic Train	Following station
Drama towards Thessaloniki	InterCity Thessaloniki–Alexandroupoli Fast train	Stavroupoli towards Alexandroupoli
Platania towards Thessaloniki	InterCity Thessaloniki–Alexandroupoli	Neochori towards Alexandroupoli
Location
- Location within Greece

Paranesti railway station (Greek: Σιδηροδρομικός Σταθμός Παρανεστίου, romanized: Sidirodromikós Stathmós Paranestiou) is a railway station that serves the Northern Greek City of Drama, in Drama in East Macedonia and Thrace, Greece. The station is located at the southern edge of the settlement but still within the settlement limits. The neoclassical station building (as of 2021) is unstaffed. Drama-Xanthi National Road passes in front of the station.

== History ==
Opened in June 1895 on what was the Société du Chemin de Fer Ottoman Jonction Salonique-Constantinople JSC, build to connect Thessaloniki and Alexandroupoli. The initial phase of its construction was in 1894, when the passenger station and the adjacent office building were built, as well as the engine room, the water tower, the maintenance house, and the engine room warehouse. In 1896 the company inaugurated the line thus connecting Thessaloniki with Dedeagats (Alexandroupolis), and consequently with Istanbul. During this period, Northern Greece and the southern Balkans were still under Ottoman rule. Drama was annexed by Greece on 18 October 1912 during the First Balkan War. The station building was built in 1916 following a decision of the French headquarters in Thessaloniki, with Serbian soldiers worked on the construction of the building. Following the failed Italian invasion, on 30 April 1941 Bulgaria occupied territory between the Struma River and a line of demarcation running through Alexandroupoli and Svilengrad west of the Maritsa river, occupying the cities of Alexandroupoli (Bulgarian: Дедеагач, romanized: Dedeagach), Komotini (Гюмюрджина, Gyumyurdzhina), Serres (Сяр, Syar), Xanthi (Ксанти), Drama (Драма) and Kavala (Кавала), which it had lost to Greece in 1918.

During the Bulgarian occupation (1941–44), it was run as part of the Bulgarian state railways. In September 1944, following Bulgarian capitulation, it was handed over to the Greek state in poor condition. In 1970 OSE became the legal successor to the SEK, taking over responsibilities for most of Greece's rail infrastructure. On 1 January 1971, the station and most of Greek rail infrastructure were transferred to the Hellenic Railways Organisation S.A., a state-owned corporation. Freight traffic declined sharply when the state-imposed monopoly of OSE for the transport of agricultural products and fertilisers ended in the early 1990s. Many small stations of the network with little passenger traffic were closed down.

In 2001 the infrastructure element of OSE was created, known as GAIAOSE; it would henceforth be responsible for the maintenance of stations, bridges and other elements of the network, as well as the leasing and the sale of railway assists. In 2005, TrainOSE was created as a brand within OSE to concentrate on rail services and passenger interface. In 2009, with the Greek debt crisis unfolding OSE's Management was forced to reduce services across the network. Timetables were cutback and routes closed, as the government-run entity attempted to reduce overheads. In 2017 OSE's passenger transport sector was privatised as TrainOSE, currently a wholly owned subsidiary of Ferrovie dello Stato Italiane infrastructure, including stations, remained under the control of OSE. In July 2022, the station began being served by Hellenic Train, the rebranded TranOSE.

In 2015 Paranesti was listed as one of five railway stations in the prefecture of Drama as cultural Monument, reflecting the development of the railways in Northern Greece from the late 19th century to the present day.

In August 2025, the Greek Ministry of Infrastructure and Transport confirmed the creation of a new body, Greek Railways (Greek: Σιδηρόδρομοι Ελλάδος, romanized: Ellinikí Sidiródromi Monoprósopi) to assume responsibility for rail infrastructure, planning, modernisation projects, and rolling stock across Greece. Previously, these functions were divided among several state-owned entities: OSE, which managed infrastructure; ERGOSÉ, responsible for modernisation projects; and GAIAOSÉ, which owned stations, buildings, and rolling stock. OSE had overseen both infrastructure and operations until its vertical separation in 2005. Rail safety has been identified as a key priority. The merger follows the July approval of a Parliamentary Bill to restructure the national railway system, a direct response to the Tempi accident of February 2023, in which 43 people died after a head-on collision.

== Facilities ==
The station is still housed in the original two-story 19th-century stone-built station building. The ground floor of the building has an area of 332.65 sq.m. and the floor is 295.70 sq.m., and its volume is 2,513.30 sq.m. There is no footbridge over the lines, passengers must walk across the rails. As of 2023 it was still not wheelchair accessible. The station is neither equipped with digital display screens or timetable poster boards.

== Services ==
It is served by four daily long-distance trains between Thessaloniki and Alexandroupolis.

(As of 2020) with the traffic restriction measures, the Drama - Alexandroupolis routes and vice versa, as well as the Drama - Thessaloniki routes and vice versa, have been suspended. However, despite the easing of travel restrictions, the railway routes in the rest of Greece have returned, the Drama Railway Station remains in "quarantine".

== Station layout ==
L Ground/Concourse	Customer service	Tickets/Exits
Level; Ε1
Level; Ε1	Side platform, doors on the right/left
Level; Ε1	Platform 1	Disused
Level; Ε1	Island platform, doors on the right/left
Level; Ε1	Platform 2	← towards Thessaloniki (Drama)
Level; Ε1	Island platform, doors on the right/left
Level; Ε1	Platform 3	towards Alexandroupoli (Stavroupoli) →
