= Rodopoli, Serres =

Rodopoli Ροδόπολη
- Community
- Location within the regional unit

- Location within Greece
- Coordinates: 41.2578°N 22.9983°E
- Country: Greece
- Administrative region: Central Macedonia
- Regional unit: Serres
- Municipality: Sintiki
- Municipal unit: Kerkini
- Elevation: 105 m (344 ft)

Population (2021)
  - Community: 850
- Time zone: UTC+2 (EET)
  - Summer (DST): UTC+3 (EEST)
- Postal code: 620 55
- Area code: +30 23270
- Vehicle registration: EP

Rodopoli (Greek: Ροδόπολη, old name: Σταθμός Ποροΐων) is a village in the regional unit of Serres, Central Macedonia region of Greece. It is situated in the municipal unit of Kerkini, in the Sintiki municipality.

Rodopoli was recognized as a Community on 2 August 1926, by a relevant Decree published in the Government Gazette (Greece), which separated the settlement from the then existing settlement of the Poroy Railway Station. The station opened in 1900, known before 1927 as Poroia (Greek: Πορόια). The settlement had been annexed by Greece on 18 October 1912 during the First Balkan War.

== Population evolution ==
Historical population
Year	Pop.	±%
1951	1,743	—
1961	1,250	−28.3%
1971	1,459	+16.7%
1981	1,190	−18.4%
1991	904	−24.0%
2001	1,149	+27.1%
2011	875	−23.8%
2021	850	−2.9%
