= Thessaloniki railway station, 1873–1961 =

Railway station in Greece

Θεσσαλονίκη (παλιός σταθμός) Thessaloniki (old station)
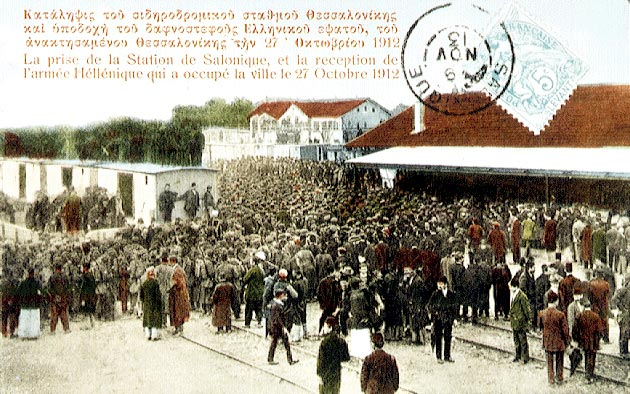
- The Old Thessaloniki railway station, 27 October 1912

General information
- Location: Thessaloniki; Greece
- Coordinates: 40°38′27″N 22°55′36″E
- System: Terminal
- Owner: GAIAOSE

Construction
- Structure type: At-grade
- Depth: 1
- Platform levels: 1

Other information
- Status: Closed
- Website: http://www.ose.gr/en/

History
- Opened: 1873
Location

The Old Thessaloniki railway station (Greek: Παλαιός Σιδηροδρομικός Σταθμός "ΠΑ.ΣΙ.Σ." Θεσσαλονίκης, Palaios Sidirodromikos Stathmos "PA.SI.S.", Thessalonikis)) was a station on the Chemins de fer Orientaux (or CO) line in Thessaloniki. It was located near the port on Old Station Street (new western entrance) at its junction with Voutyras Stavrou Street.

== History ==
The station opened in its original form in 1873 on what was the Chemins de fer Orientaux (or CO) build to connect Thessaloniki and Constantinople (via Niš). At the time Thessaloniki was part of the Ottoman Empire

On 8 November 1912, the city superseded to the approaching Greek army. Thessaloniki was annexed by Greece on 29 June 1913 during the Second Balkan War. On 17 October 1925, The Greek government purchased the Greek sections of the former Salonica Monastir railway, and the railway became part of the Hellenic State Railways, with the remaining section north of Florina seeded to Yugoslavia. In 1920 Hellenic State Railways or SEK was established; however, many railways, such as the SPAP continued to be run as a separate company, becoming an independent company once more two years later.

The architectural tender for the New Railway Station, to replace the now outdated Old Thessaloniki railway station was announced in 1935 construction began 26 October 1937 following an international architectural design competition that was carried out at the time and won by German architect Hans Kleinschmidt, a notable runner-up was Nikolaos Mitsakis. Kleinschmidt's complete designs were never realised as they were later changed by other architects, but formed the base for what the station would later become. The main concrete shell of the building was completed before the Second World War, but construction was halted when Greece entered the war.

Today, the site is used as a freight stop and sidings.

== Future ==
Today is a listed building of special architectural value and thus protected. During the mayorship of Sotiris Kouvelas It has been proposed the station reopen as a passenger station of the suburban railway of Thessaloniki.

The Holocaust Museum of Greece will be built on the site of the station.

In the complex of the old railway station, specifically at the junction of Stathmos and 26 October Streets, the Thessaloniki-Polis (Salonique Ville) station operated, which in the Profyllides study in 1988 on behalf of the Municipality of Thessaloniki, was planned as a metro station. PA.SI.S. is served by line 12 of the OASTH KTEL Makedonia – Kato Toumpa, old railway station stop.

== Gallery ==
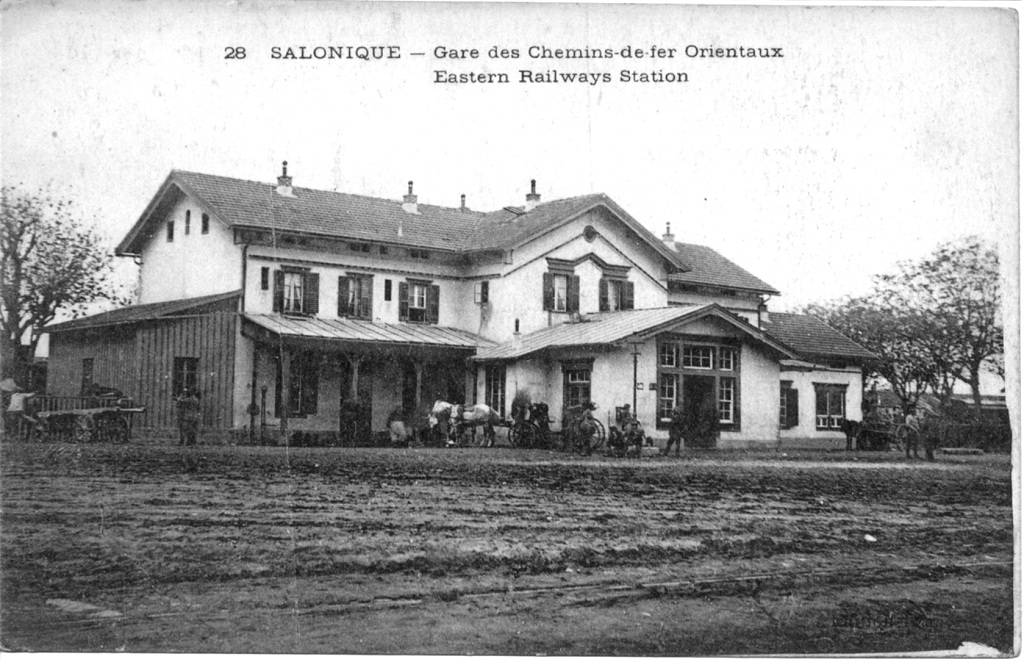
View of the old station buildings.

== See also ==
- Hellenic Railways Organization
- TrainOSE
- Chemins de fer Orientaux
