= Thessaloniki railway station =

Railway station in Thessaloniki, Greece

Θεσσαλονίκη Thessaloniki
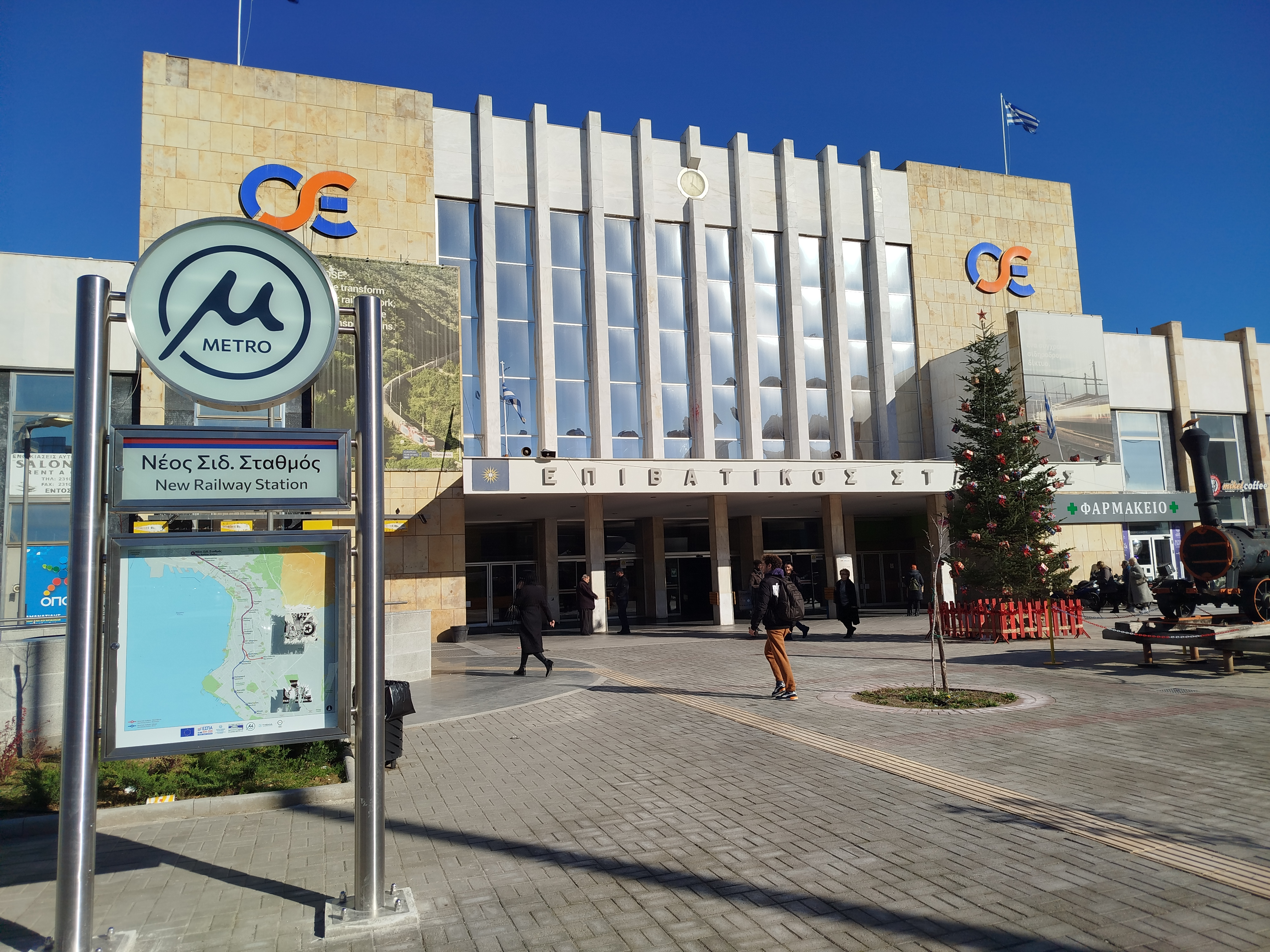
- Thessaloniki railway station forecourt, December 2024

General information
- Location: 28 Monastiriou Street; Thessaloniki; Central Macedonia; Greece
- Coordinates: 40°38′40″N 22°55′46″E
- Owner: GAIAOSE
- Operator: Hellenic Train
- Lines: Thessaloniki–Bitola railway; Thessaloniki–Alexandroupolis railway; Piraeus–Platy railway; Thessaloniki–Skopje railway
- Platforms: 7 (1 disused)
- Tracks: 9
- Bus routes: Alexandroupoli Port, Dikaia
- Connections: Bus

Construction
- Structure type: at-grade
- Platform levels: 2
- Parking: Yes
- Cycle facilities: Yes
- Architect: Hans Kleinschmidt
- Architectural style: Modernist New Objectivity (architecture)

Other information
- Status: Staffed
- Station code: THN (Passenger); TH (Freight); DL (Marshalling)
- Website: http://www.ose.gr/en/

History
- Rebuilt: 1937-1967
- Electrified: 25 kV AC, 50 Hz (1998; 28 years ago)
- Former names: Thessaloniki New Railway Station

Key dates
- 6 December 1961: Railway station opened
- 7 September 2007: Suburban Railway Line 1 opened
- 25 January 2008: Regional Railway Line 2 (T2) opened
- 3 February 2020: Suburban Railway Line 3 opened

Services
Preceding station	Hellenic Train	Following station
Platy towards Athens	C1 Athens-Thessaloniki	Terminus
Preceding station	Regional Rail	Following station
Sindos towards Larissa	Line T1	Terminus
Sindos towards Florina	Line T2	Terminus
Nea Filadelfeia towards Drama	Line T3	Terminus
Connections to other stations
Preceding station	Thessaloniki Metro	Following station
Terminus	Line 1	Dimokratias towards Nea Elvetia
Terminus	Line 2	Dimokratias towards Mikra
Former/Suspended services
Preceding station	Hellenic Train	Following station
Larissa towards Athens	InterCity Express	Terminus
Gallikos towards Alexandroupoli	InterCity Thessaloniki–Alexandroupoli Fast train	Terminus
Nea Filadelfeia towards Alexandroupoli	InterCity Thessaloniki–Alexandroupoli	Terminus
Nea Filadelfeia towards Serres	InterCity Thessaloniki–Serres	Terminus
Idomeni towards Belgrade	Hellas Express	Terminus
Strymonas towards Sofia	Thessaloniki-Sofia Express	Terminus
Preceding station	Turkish State Railways	Following station
Terminus	Friendship Express	Kilkis towards Istanbul
Location
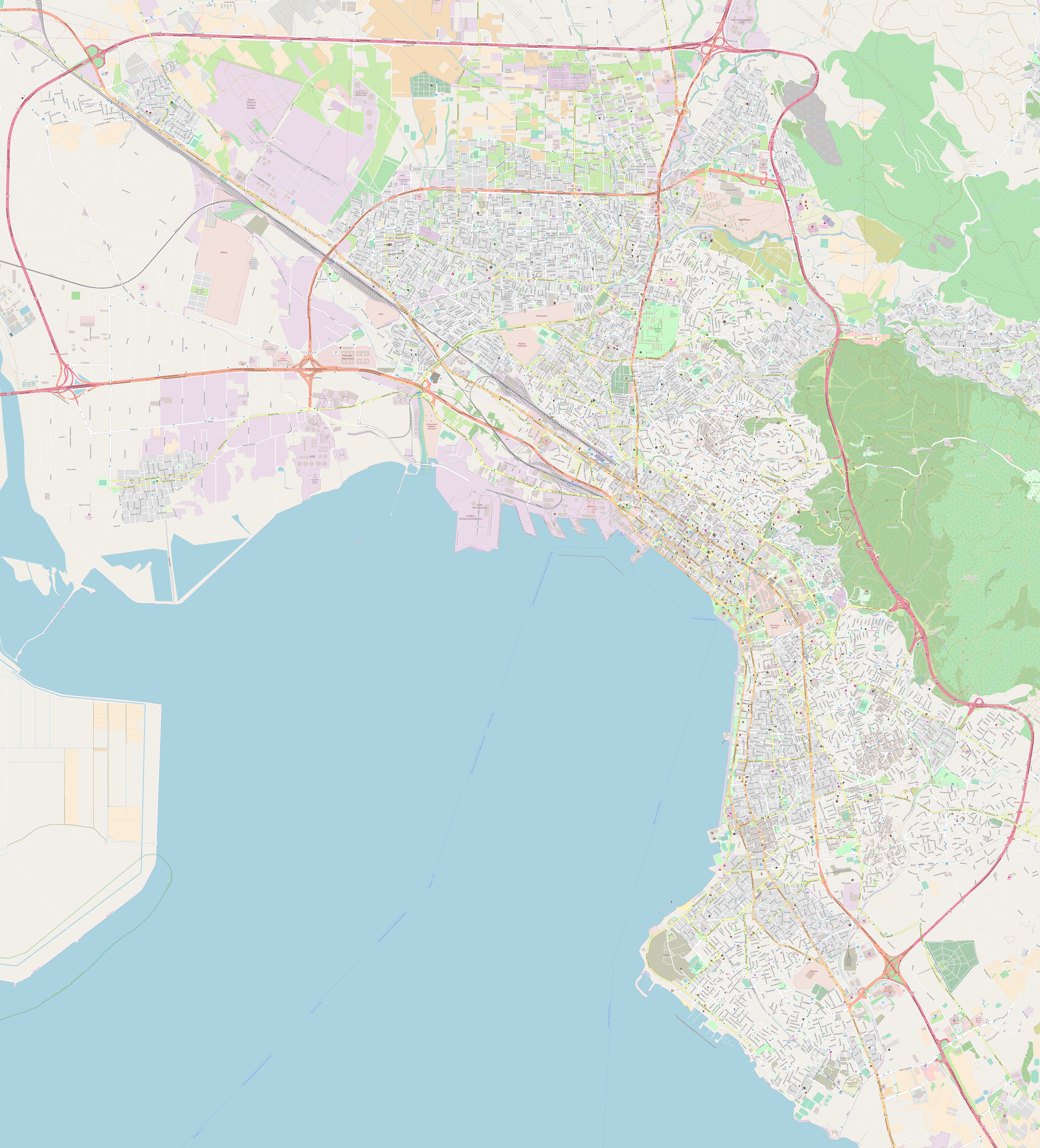
- Location within the Thessaloniki urban area

Thessaloniki railway station (Greek: Νέος Σιδηροδρομικός Σταθμός "Ν.Σ.Σ.", Θεσσαλονίκης, Neos Sidirodromikos Stathmos "N.S.S.", Thessalonikis) is the main central passenger railway station and terminal of Thessaloniki, Greece's second-largest city. It is located in the central quarter of Xirokrini on Monastiriou Street and was inaugurated on 12 June 1961, the passenger station replaced the older and much smaller passenger station which now handles the city's cargo rail, hence the "new" sometimes used in the name.

As of 2022, long-distance trains from Thessaloniki railway station are run by Hellenic Train to Athens, Alexandroupolis, Larissa, and Florina. International long-distance operators used to include Bulgarian Railways, Serbian Railways and Makedonski Železnici, to Sofia, Belgrade and Skopje railway station respectively. The Thessaloniki Regional Railway runs suburban commuter and regional services in and around Thessaly and Western Macedonia.

Although largely unchanged since the 1960s, it remains the largest and busiest railway station in Greece and one of the country's most important works of modern architecture. The station is also the terminus for Line 1 of the Thessaloniki Metro, which is accessible via New Railway Station metro station.

== History ==
=== Thessaloniki new railway station ===
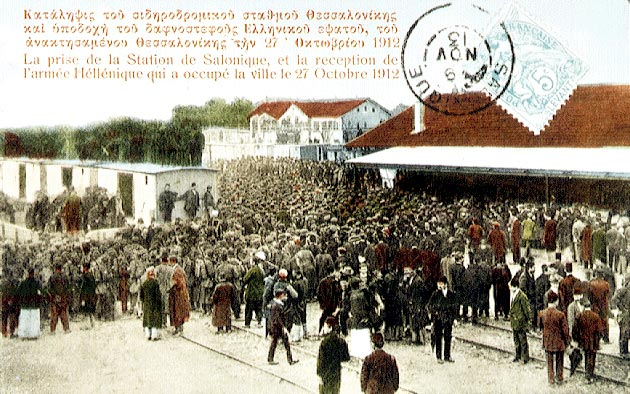
The Old Thessaloniki railway station, 27 October 1912

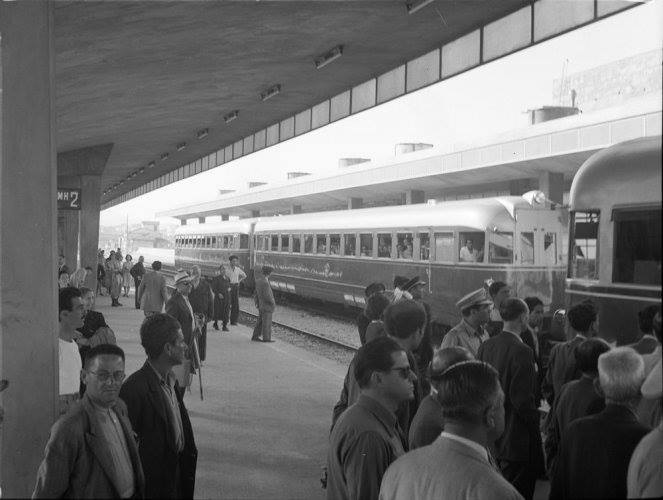
Passengers on the platform of the railway station, 1949–1950 Photographer: Ioannis Lambros, Archive: Benaki Museum

The architectural tender for the new railway station, to replace the now outdated Old Thessaloniki railway station was announced in 1935 construction began 26 October 1937 following an international architectural design competition that was carried out at the time and won by German architect Hans Kleinschmidt, a notable runner-up was Nikolaos Mitsakis. Kleinschmidt's complete designs were never realised as they were later changed by other architects, but formed the base for what the station would later become. The main concrete shell of the building was completed before the Second World War, but construction was halted when Greece entered the war. Although the building was bombed throughout the early 1940s, it did not sustain heavy damage.

Following the war, the station saw no development for over 20 years; however, the station began to operate in a substandard manner, while the old station continued to function as the city's railway terminus. In 1958, the project was restarted, headed by Greek architects Molfesi and Papagianni, who made changes to the original design by Kleinschmidt, with a more modernist style. The project was finally completed in New Objectivity style, handed over to the Ministry of Public Works three years later, and Inaugurated on 12 June 1961, On its completion the station, occupied an area of 90 acres, making it one of the largest railway stations in the Balkans.

Electrification was installed in the 1990s with the assistance of the Romanian Railways, and in 1998 the first electric services started to Gevgelija using a leased CFR Class 41 locomotive of the Brașov depot.

=== GAIAOSE ===
In 2001 the infrastructure element of OSE was created, known as GAIAOSE; it would henceforth be responsible for the maintenance of stations, bridges and other elements of the network, as well as the leasing and the sale of railway assists. In 2003, OSE launched "Proastiakos SA", as a subsidiary to serve the operation of the suburban network in the urban complex of Athens during the 2004 Olympic Games. In 2005, TrainOSE was created as a brand within OSE to concentrate on rail services and passenger interface.

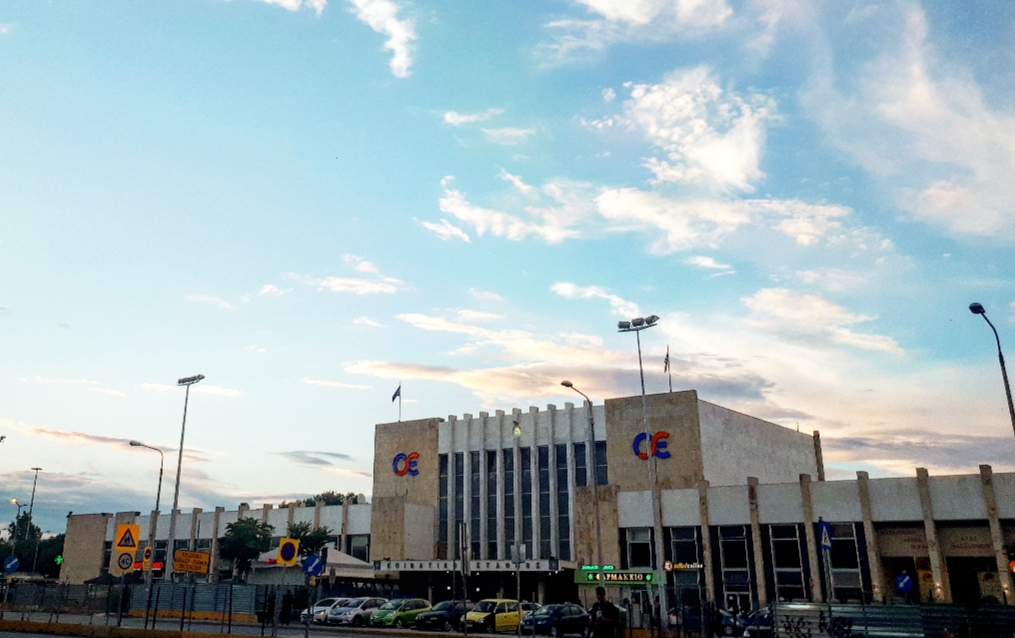
View of the station building in 2018

The station has remained largely unchanged since that time, although minor additions have occurred, such as the construction of a shopping centre adjacent to the waiting hall and the installation of escalators for access to the platforms. In April 2006, the construction works of the Thessaloniki Metro began, with the most recent addition to the station, the construction of a metro station that is to form part of the new railway station complex. In 2008, all Proastiakos were transferred from OSE to TrainOSE.

In late 2019 the Metro station was open to the public for guided tours as part of Open House Thessaloniki. In February 2011, the station suffered a loss of importance given the suspension of all rail links to international destinations. In 2014, however, international connections were partially restored with twice-daily trains to Sofia and the reinstatement of the over-night train to Skopje and Belgrade. As of November 2021 the Friendship Express to Istanbul remains suspended.

On 16 January 2021, The first of five White Arrow high-speed trains (ordered by Trainose arrived in Thessaloniki from Italy). After crew training rollingstock tests, the train's first trip with passengers on board will be on the Athens-Thessaloniki line on 25 March, a date chosen to coincide with the 200th anniversary of the 1821 Greek Revolution against Ottoman rule. In October 2021 a Suburban service (train 3590), from Larissa derailed just outside the Thessaloniki station The derailment is being blamed on poor and delayed maintenance on the existing rail infrastructure. No reports of injuries to passengers or staff were reported. In July 2022, the station began being served by Hellenic Train, the rebranded TrainOSE.

In November 2023, rail services resumed between Rapsani and Larissa after a devastating storm in September damaged sections of track across the region. With Through services to Athens recommencing on 16 December 2023.

In November 2025, safety concerns were again raised when a service from Thessaloniki to Larissa was routed to the wrong line, with the driver engaging the brakes immediately, without having been alerted by the stationmaster at Sindos. The stationmaster then informed the driver that there was a technical fault in the track switches and instructed him to reverse and re-enter the station so that passengers could safely disembark.

== Facilities ==
The station currently features large waiting areas, a central hall with cafes, restaurants, a small chapel and a shopping centre within a 1960s era building. The staffed station has staffed ticket offices and luggage lockers. There is a taxi rank and Parking in the forecourt. On the platforms, seating is available under the original 1960s modernist canopies.

Discussions are underway for the expansion of the station and a general overhaul, which will also include a hotel and a revamp of the central offices of the OSE for northern Greece.

In June 2020, during the COVID-19 pandemic, the station was one of the first in Greece to Utilise thermal cameras in order to measure the temperature of staff and passengers, as an additional precautionary measure against the coronavirus.

=== Future ===
Before 2025, the former Hellenic Railways Organisation now (Greek Railways), which at the time owned the station, announced its intentions to overhaul the station. The plans will include the creation of a 150-bed hotel and regional offices of the OSE. Since April 2026, no official statement has been given on the matter.

== Services ==
=== Regional and local rail services ===
As of September 2026, the following weekday services depart from this station:

- Thessaloniki Regional Railway Line T1 towards Larissa, with up to eight trains per day in each direction;
- Thessaloniki Regional Railway Line T2, with two trains per day in each direction towards Florina, and one towards Edessa;
- Thessaloniki Regional Railway Line T3 towards Serres, with two trains per day in each direction.

There is also an unnumbered shuttle that operates between Thessaloniki and Sindos, for students of the International Hellenic University: it operates on weekdays only (except academic and public holidays), with six trains per day in each direction.

=== National and international rail services ===
The station is served the following Hellenic Train services:

- Regional services to Palaiofarsalos.
- Express services to Kalambaka.
- InterCity routes to Alexandroupoli.
- InterCity routes to Larissa and Athens.
- InterCity Express (ETR) routes to Larissa and Athens.
- International routes to Belgrade via Skopje. (rail replacement bus part of the journey)
- International routes to Sofia (rail replacement bus part of the journey)

Note: Between July 2005 and February 2011, the Friendship Express, (an international InterCity train jointly operated by the Turkish State Railways (TCDD) and TrainOSE linking Istanbul's Sirkeci Terminal, Turkey and Greece terminated at Thessaloniki railway station.

=== Local public transport ===
The station is also served by local and regional buses:

OASTH operates lines Χ1, Ν1 (night-only), 2Κ, 3Κ, 09, 10, 11, 14, 14Α, 17, 19, 23, 37, 38 and 52, KTEL operates lines 40, 45, 51, 54, 55Χ, 56, 64, ( 70, 71 summer itineraries) and 84 while OSE operates some services. (All services are accessible from the forecourt).

== Track layout ==
G
Through line
Siding
Platform 7
← towards Athens (Sindos)
Island platform, doors open on the left/right
Platform 6
← towards Athens (Sindos)
Platform 5
← towards Athens (Sindos)
Island platform, doors open on the left/right
Platform 4
← towards Athens (Sindos)
Platform 3
← towards Athens (Sindos)
Island platform, doors open on the left/right
Platform 2
← towards Athens (Sindos)
Platform 1
← to Larissa / to Florina / to Serres (Sindos)
Side platform, doors open on the right
- Street level
- Concourse
- Customer service
- Shops
- Buffet
- Tickets
- Exits

== Transportation ==
Thessaloniki railway station is the western terminus of the Thessaloniki Metro, and is served by the New Railway Station metro station.

Bus line Χ1 of Thessaloniki Urban Transport Organization (OASTH) connects the railway station with Macedonia InterCity Bus Terminal (KTEL) and Macedonia International Airport.

The station provides minimal parking space, although two new underground parking facilities, with four floors each, are currently under construction as part of the Thessaloniki Metro project. When completed, they will provide parking space for 450 and 600 cars, respectively, with a total capacity of 1050 cars.

== Gallery ==
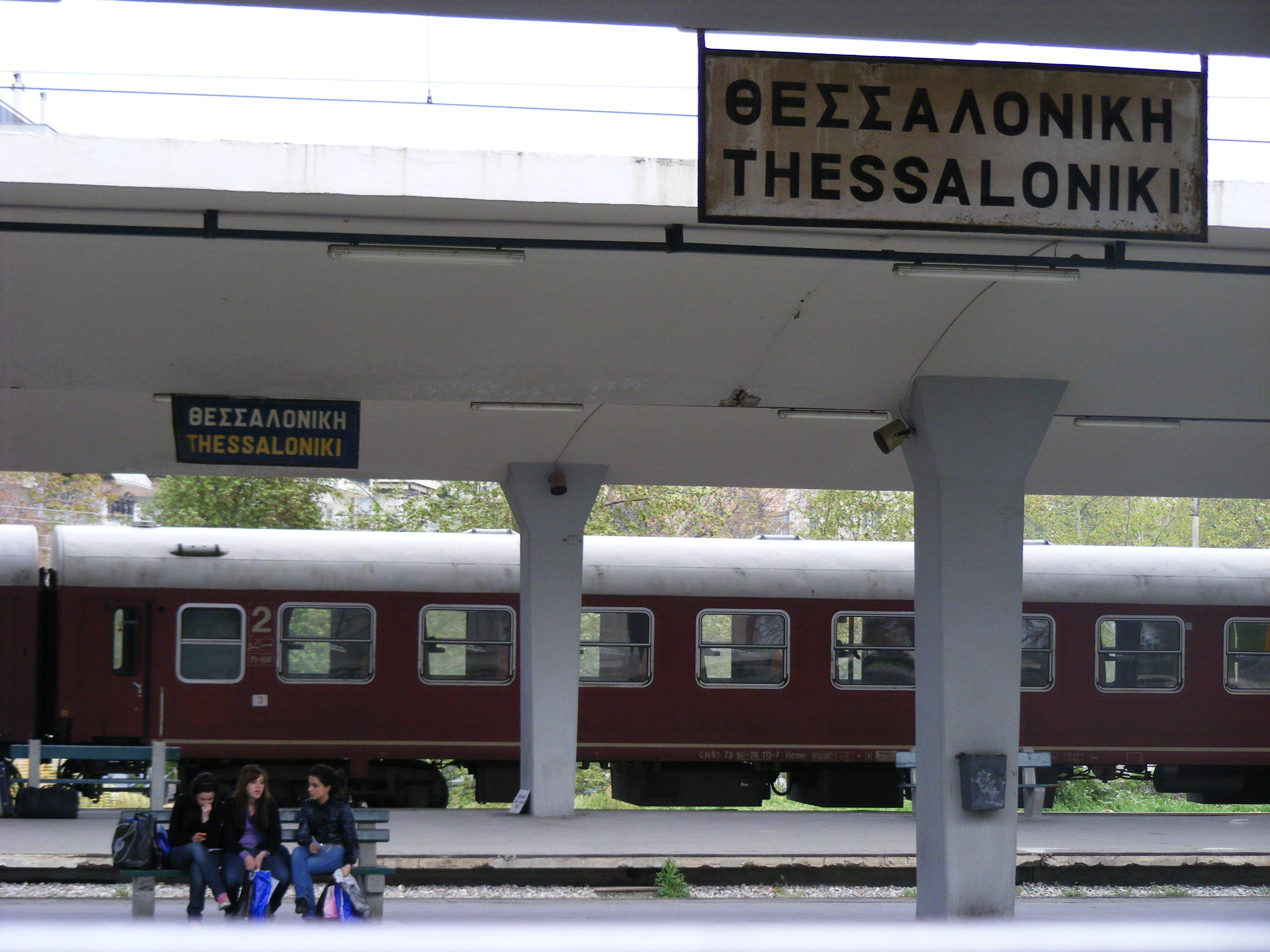
Platforms of the Thessaloniki station, from inside the station, April 2009

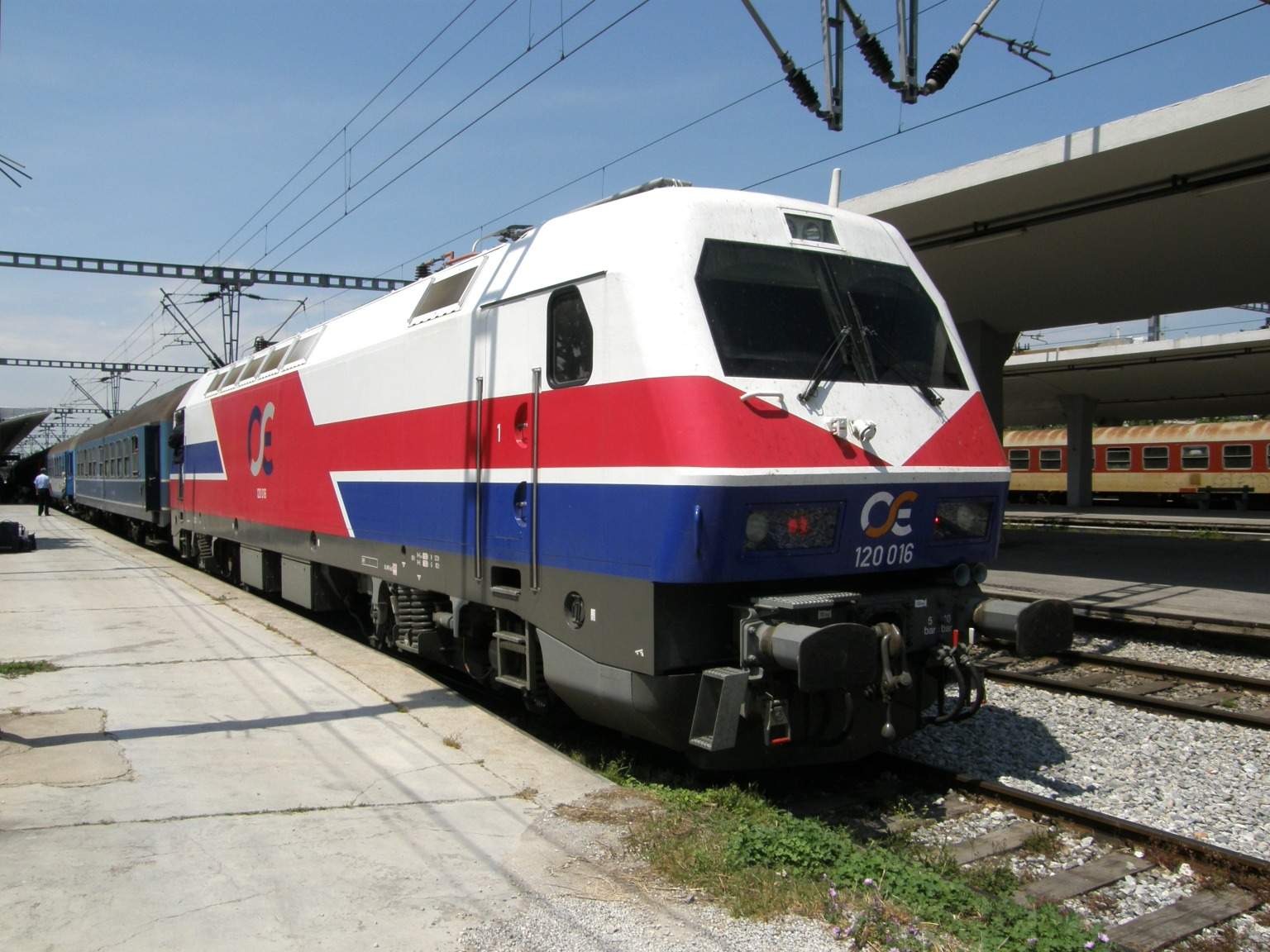
Siemens/Henschel HellasSprinter electric locomotive 120-016 of OSE entering Thessaloniki station with train 335 from Belgrade, May 2007

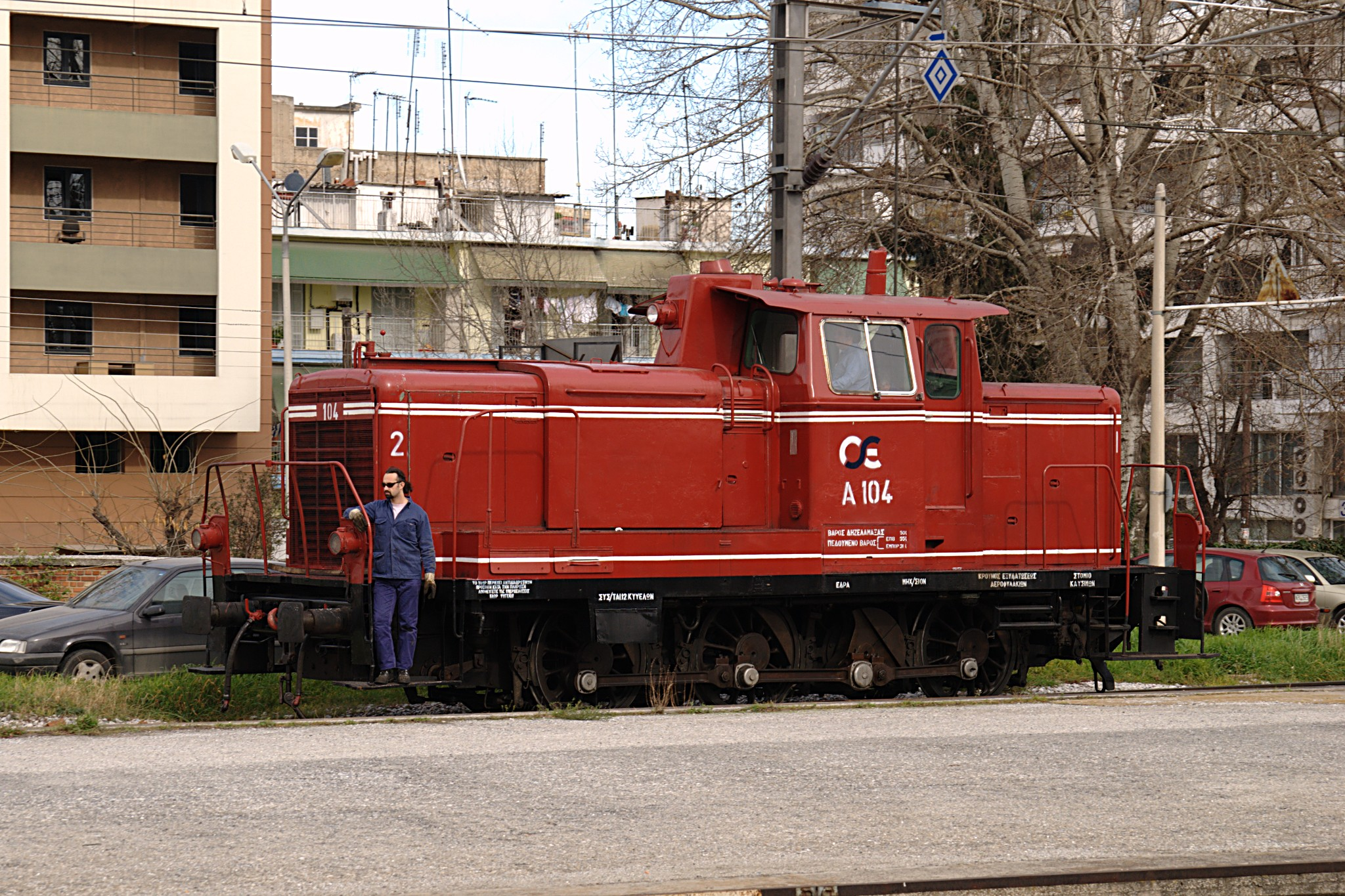
Krupp Y60 diesel locomotive A-104 (similar to DB Class V 60) of OSE at Thessaloniki station, February 2009

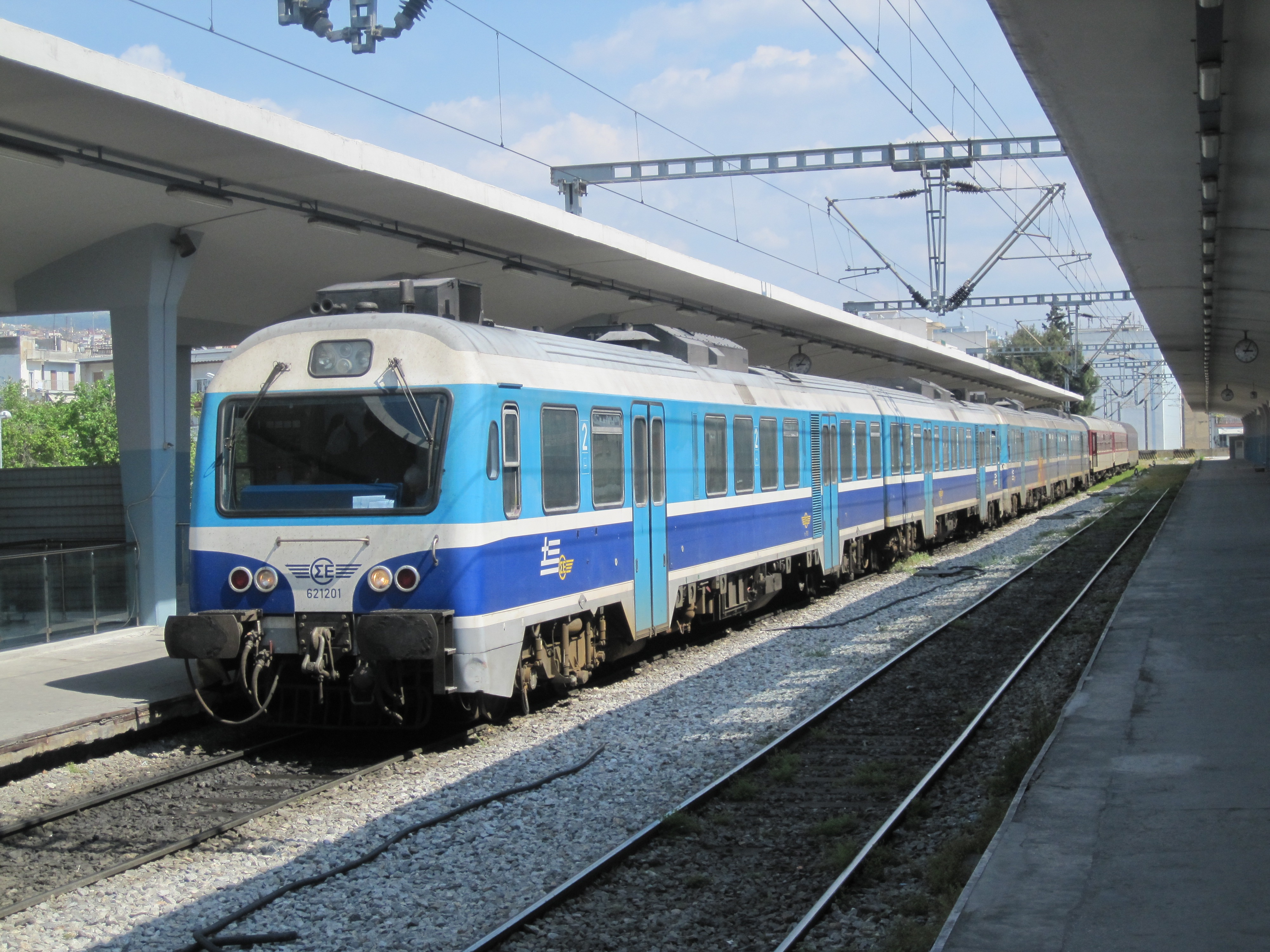
2-car DMU class 621 sets for "regional" services, seen at Thessaloníki, April 2010

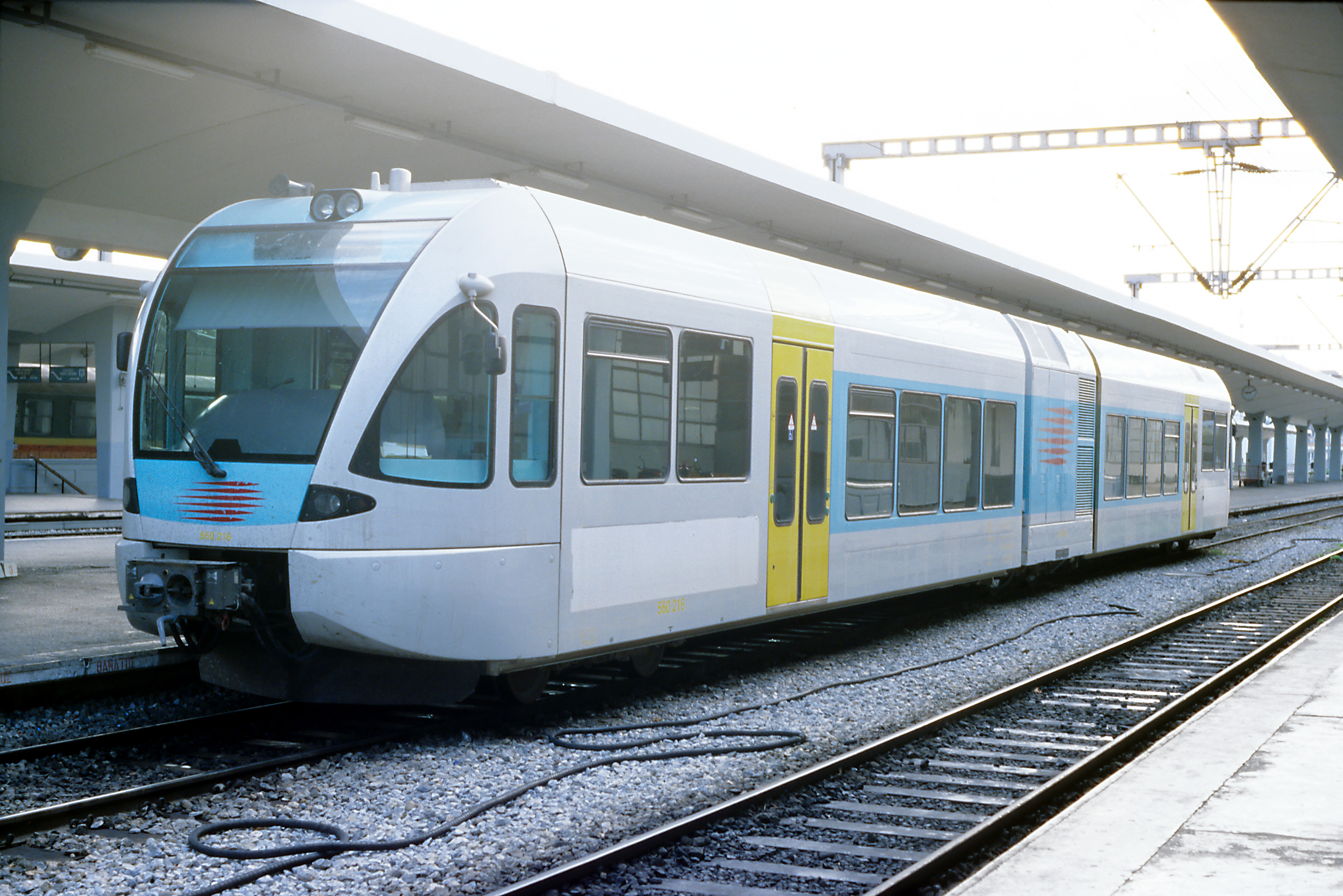
One of the Stadler GTW 2/6 that OSE procured before the 2004 Olympic Games. The local transport service Proastiakos Thessaloniki had not yet been launched, but the railcars were already delivered in the appropriate livery, October 2005.

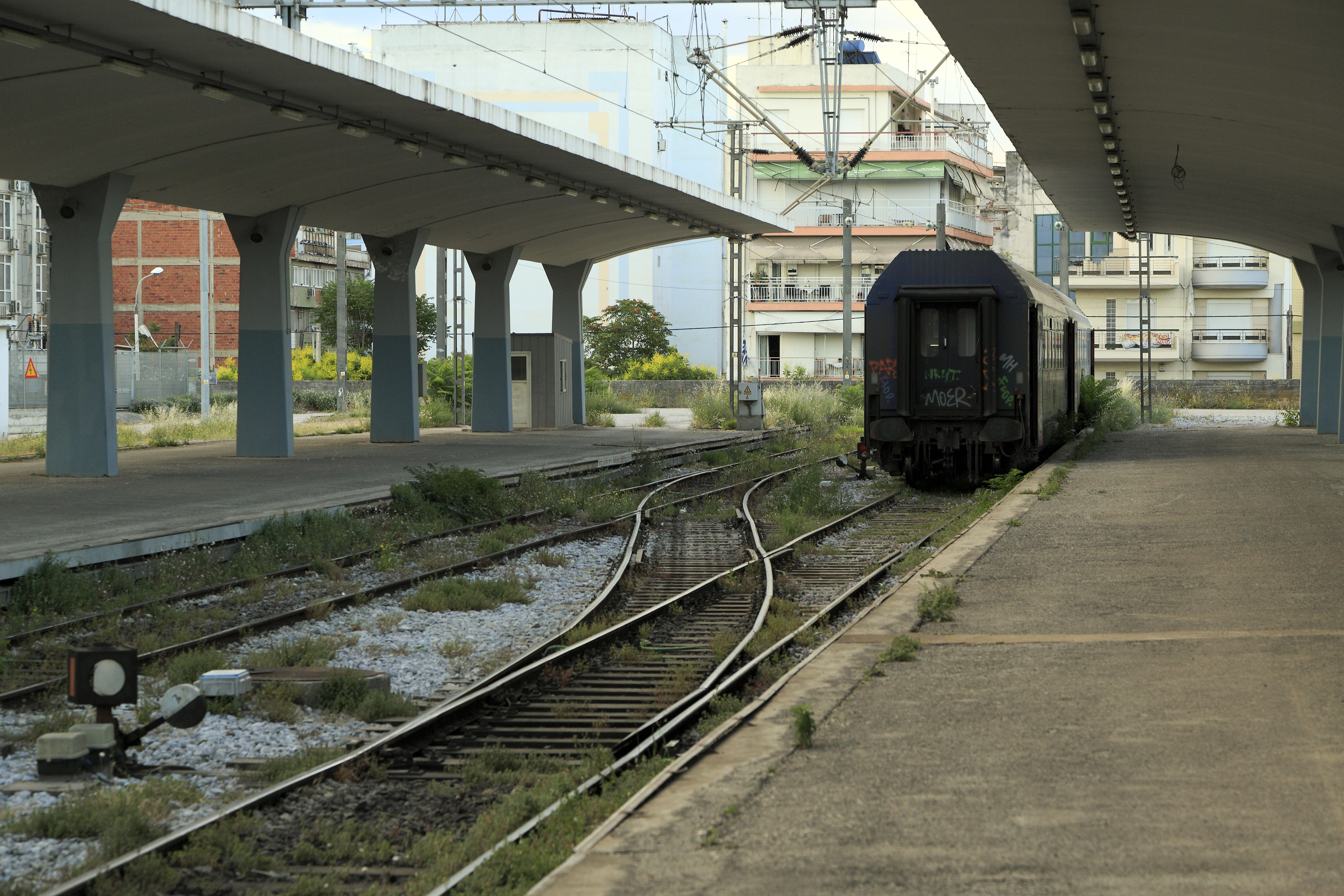
The through cars waiting on the "dead-end" in front of the buffer stop; they are supposed to go with the night train 600 from Athens to Alexandrúpoli as far as Strymonas, June 2016.

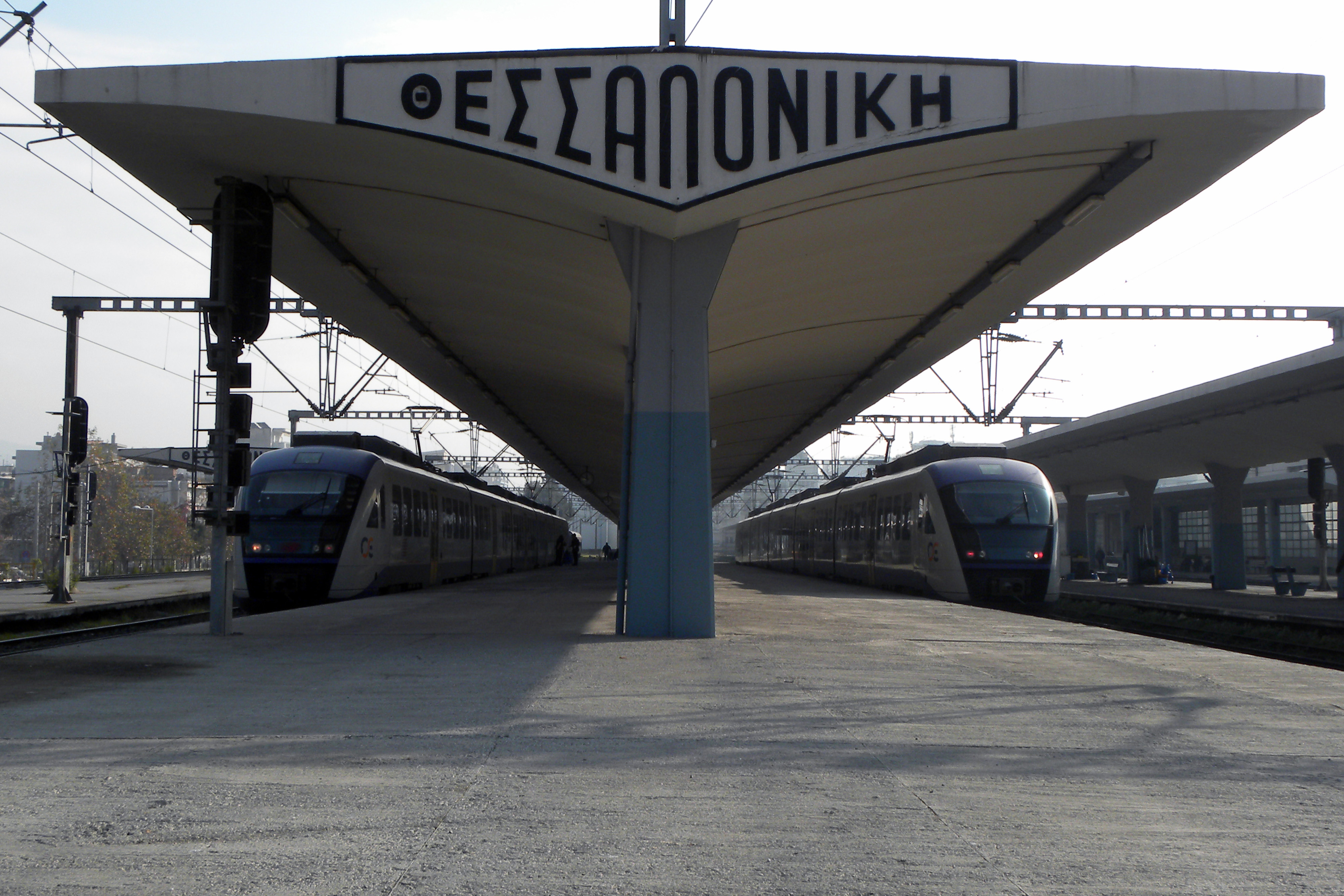
One of the 1960s modernist platform canopies, January 2011

== See also ==
- Athens railway station
- Thessaloniki Urban Transport Organization
- Railways of Greece
- Greek railway stations
- Greek Railways
- Hellenic Train
- Proastiakos
- P.A.Th.E./P.
