= Friendship Express =

Former international train service.

Friendship Express Dostluk Ekspresi Εξπρές Φιλίας
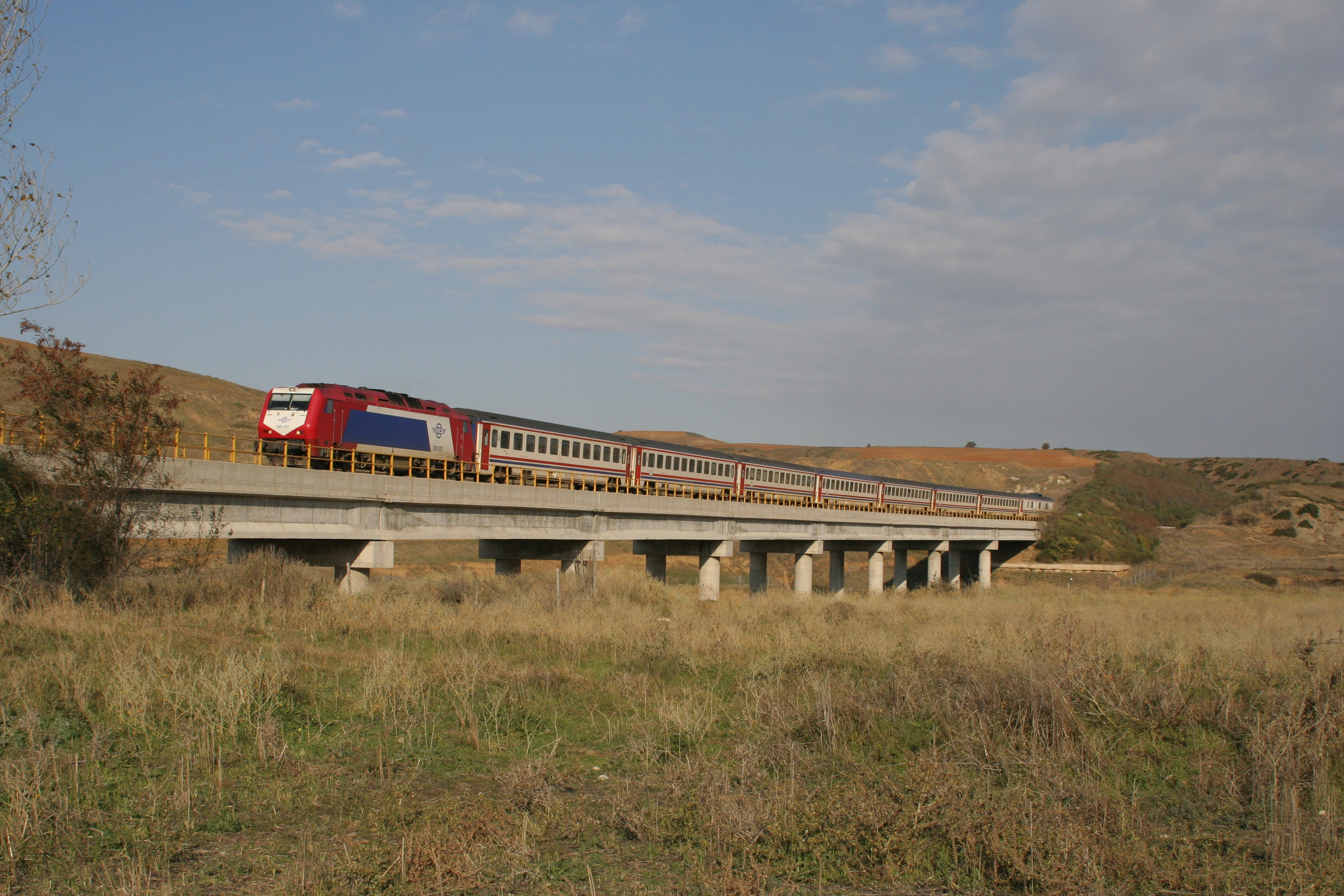
- OSE 220-027 pulls the westbound train near Filadelphia, Greece, consisting of all-Turkish equipment.

Overview
- Service type: InterCity
- Status: Discontinued
- Locale: European Turkey, northern Greece
- First service: July 2005
- Last service: February 2011
- Current operators: TCDD, TrainOSE

Route
- Termini: Sirkeci Terminal, Istanbul; Thessaloniki railway station, Thessaloniki
- Stops: 10
- Average journey time: 13h03' (westbound), 12h19' (eastbound)
- Service frequency: Daily each way
- Train number: 444/445, 81021/81022
- Lines used: Istanbul–Pythio railway, Alexandroupoli–Svilengrad railway, Thessaloniki–Alexandroupoli railway

On-board services
- Sleeping arrangements: 5 TCDD Sleepers, 3 OSE Sleepers
- Catering facilities: yes

Technical
- Track gauge: 1,435 mm (4 ft 8 1/2 in)
- Electrification: Istanbul to Pehlivankoy
- Track owners: OSE Thessaloniki–Pythion, TCDD Istanbul–Hudut

The Friendship Express (Turkish: Dostluk Ekspresi, Greek: Εξπρές Φιλίας, Exprés Filías), was an international InterCity train jointly operated by the Turkish State Railways (TCDD) and TrainOSE from July 2005 to February 2011, linking Istanbul's Sirkeci Terminal, Turkey and Thessaloniki, Greece. Eastbound trains (service 444/81021) departed daily at 19:48 from Thessaloniki arriving to Istanbul at 08:07. Westbound trains (service 81022/445) departed at 20:30 from Istanbul, arriving to Thessaloniki at 09:33.

There were two trains on this service, one provided by TrainOSE and the other by TCDD. TrainOSE used OSE former SNCF type T2 sleeping cars while TCDD used TVS2000 type cars. The trains changed locomotives and crew at Pythio.

This train service was terminated on 13 February 2011. This is due to cost cutting by Greek state-owned company TrainOSE.

On 8 March 2016 Greece and Turkey signed an intergovernmental agreement for reconnecting the line Istanbul to Thessaloniki with an enhancement to Igoumenitsa (a town facing towards Italy) with the goal to create the Egnatia Railway As of late 2026, the Friendship Express was still not running.

== See also ==
- Budapest–Belgrade–Skopje–Athens railway
- Balkan Express (train)
- Bosphorus Express
