= Drama railway station =

Railway station in Greece

Δράμα Drama
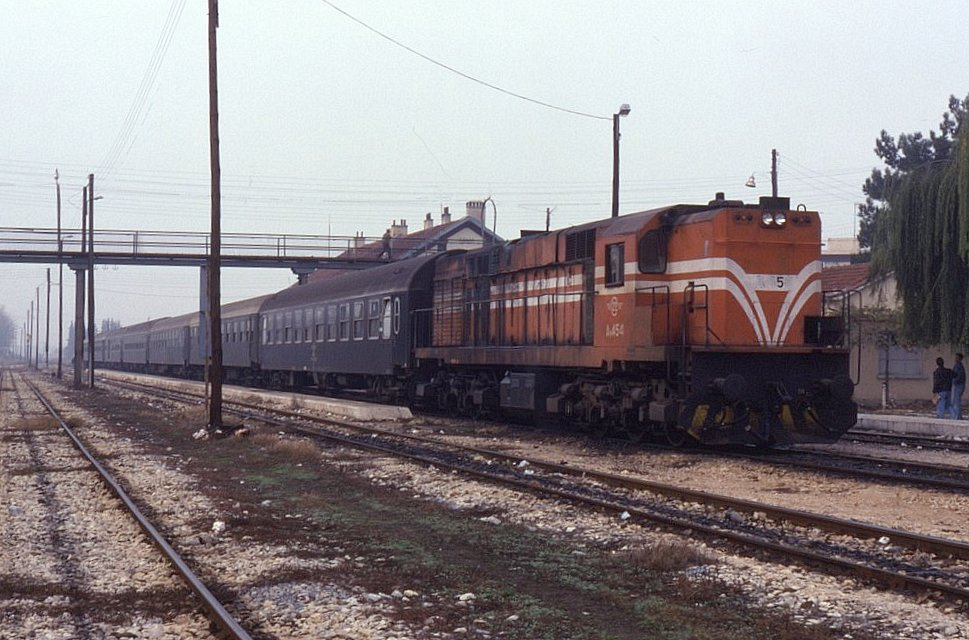
- MLW built loco A.454 is on train 604, 21:00 Athens to Ormenio departing Drama, 5 November 1992

General information
- Location: Ethnikis Aminis 109, Drama, PC 66100; Drama; Greece
- Coordinates: 41°08′25″N 24°08′49″E
- Owner: GAIAOSE
- Line: Thessaloniki–Alexandroupolis railway
- Platforms: 3 (1 disused)
- Tracks: 6
- Train operators: Hellenic Train

Construction
- Structure type: at-grade
- Depth: 1
- Platform levels: 1
- Parking: Yes
- Cycle facilities: Yes

Other information
- Status: Unstaffed
- Website: http://www.ose.gr/en/

History
- Opened: 1895
- Rebuilt: post 1945
- Electrified: No

Services
Preceding station	Hellenic Train	Following station
Terminus	G5 Drama-Alexandroupoli	Paranesti towards Alexandroupolis
Preceding station	Regional Rail	Following station
Fotolivos towards Thessaloniki	Line T3	Terminus
Former and suspended services
Preceding station	Hellenic Train	Following station
Serres towards Thessaloniki	InterCity Thessaloniki–Alexandroupoli Fast train	Nikiforos towards Alexandroupoli
Fotolivos towards Thessaloniki	InterCity Thessaloniki–Alexandroupoli	Nikiforos towards Alexandroupoli
Preceding station	Turkish State Railways	Following station
Serres towards Thessaloniki	Friendship Express	Xanthi towards Istanbul
Location
- Location within Greece

Drama railway station (Greek: Σιδηροδρομικός Σταθμός Δράμας, romanized: Sidirodromikós Stathmós Drámas) is a railway station that serves the Northern Greek City of Drama, in Drama in East Macedonia and Thrace, Greece. The station is located 2 kilometres (1.2 mi) (25 Min walk) south of the settlement but still within the settlement limits. The neoclassical station building (as of 2021) is unstaffed.

== History ==
Opened in June 1895 on what was the Société du Chemin de Fer Ottoman Jonction Salonique-Constantinople JSC, build to connect Thessaloniki and Alexandroupoli. The initial phase of its construction was in 1894, when the passenger station and the adjacent office building were built, as well as the engine room, the water tower, the maintenance house, and the engine room warehouse. In 1896 the company inaugurated the line thus connecting Thessaloniki with Dedeagats (Alexandroupolis), and consequently with Istanbul. During this period, Northern Greece and the southern Balkans were still under Ottoman rule. Drama was annexed by Greece on 18 October 1912 during the First Balkan War. The station building was built in 1916 following a decision of the French headquarters in Thessaloniki, with Serbian soldiers worked on the construction of the building. In May 1918, the station was bombed by the German air force. During the interwar period, the car depot, the engine room office building, the foreman's house, the sub-engine room dormitory, the military warehouse and the turntable were built. Following the failed Italian invasion, on 30 April 1941 Bulgaria occupied territory between the Struma River and a line of demarcation running through Alexandroupoli and Svilengrad west of the Maritsa river, occupying the cities of Alexandroupoli (Bulgarian: Дедеагач, romanized: Dedeagach), Komotini (Гюмюрджина, Gyumyurdzhina), Serres (Сяр, Syar), Xanthi (Ксанти), Drama (Драма) and Kavala (Кавала), which it had lost to Greece in 1918.

During the Bulgarian occupation (1941–44), it was run as part of the Bulgarian state railways. In September 1944, following Bulgarian capitulation, it was handed over to the Greek state in poor condition. Newer additions were created after 1950, such as engine room workshops, two barns, and new fuel depots. In 1970 OSE became the legal successor to the SEK, taking over responsibilities for most of Greece's rail infrastructure. On 1 January 1971, the station and most of Greek rail infrastructure were transferred to the Hellenic Railways Organisation S.A., a state-owned corporation. Freight traffic declined sharply when the state-imposed monopoly of OSE for the transport of agricultural products and fertilisers ended in the early 1990s. Many small stations of the network with little passenger traffic were closed down.

In 2001 the infrastructure element of OSE was created, known as GAIAOSE; it would henceforth be responsible for the maintenance of stations, bridges and other elements of the network, as well as the leasing and the sale of railway assists. In 2005, TrainOSE was created as a brand within OSE to concentrate on rail services and passenger interface. In 2009, with the Greek debt crisis unfolding OSE's Management was forced to reduce services across the network. Timetables were cutback and routes closed, as the government-run entity attempted to reduce overheads. In 2017 OSE's passenger transport sector was privatised as TrainOSE, currently a wholly owned subsidiary of Ferrovie dello Stato Italiane infrastructure, including stations, remained under the control of OSE.

In 2015 Drama was listed as one of five railway stations in the prefecture of Drama as cultural Monument, reflecting the development of the railways in Northern Greece from the late 19th century to the present day. In the summer of 2019, members of the Bristol Scout 1264 team, filmmakers and historians from England met in the wider region of Eastern Macedonia. From 7–9 September 2019, Drama hosted the 1st International Meeting in Drama for performance art at the station. In 2020, questions were raised over accessibility at the station during a session of parliament. In July 2022, the station began being served by Hellenic Train, the rebranded TranOSE.

In August 2025, the Greek Ministry of Infrastructure and Transport confirmed the creation of a new body, Greek Railways (Greek: Σιδηρόδρομοι Ελλάδος, romanized: Ellinikí Sidiródromi Monoprósopi) to assume responsibility for rail infrastructure, planning, modernisation projects, and rolling stock across Greece. Previously, these functions were divided among several state-owned entities: OSE, which managed infrastructure; ERGOSÉ, responsible for modernisation projects; and GAIAOSÉ, which owned stations, buildings, and rolling stock. OSE had overseen both infrastructure and operations until its vertical separation in 2005. Rail safety has been identified as a key priority. The merger follows the July approval of a Parliamentary Bill to restructure the national railway system, a direct response to the Tempi accident of February 2023, in which 43 people died after a head-on collision.

Today, the old station warehouse building houses the Drama Railway Museum founded by the Educational, Cultural and Sports Association of Railway Employees "IFESTOS". In March 2021 an Authentic 1929 built Orian Express wagons and locomotives arrived at the station.

== Facilities ==
The station is still housed in the original two-story 19th-century stone-built station building. The ground floor of the building has an area of 332.65 sq.m. and the floor is 295.70 sq.m., and its volume is 2,513.30 sq.m. Its facilities occupy an area of 98,000 sq.m. (98 acres). Which now houses a museum. As of (2021) the station is maintained and well kept. There is a footbridge over the lines, though passengers can walk across the rails. There is currently (as of 2021) not wheelchair accessible. The station is equipped with digital display screens and timetable poster boards. The station was equipped with a cafe/restaurant, as evidenced by the signage on platform 1. However, this has since closed.

== Services ==
As of 12 May 2025, Line 3 of the Thessaloniki Regional Railway calls at this station: service is currently limited, with one train per day to Thessaloniki (train 1635), and one train per day from Thessaloniki (1634).

It was also served by two long-distance trains between Thessaloniki and Alexandroupolis, as well as the Friendship Express between Thessaloniki and Sirkeci in Istanbul (from July 2005 and February 2011): both services are currently suspended.

== Station layout ==
L Ground/Concourse	Customer service	Tickets/Exits
Level; Ε1
Level; Ε1	Side platform, doors on the right/left
Level; Ε1	Platform 1	← towards Thessaloniki
Level; Ε1	Island platform, doors on the right/left
Level; Ε1	Platform 2	← towards Thessaloniki (Fotolivos)
Level; Ε1	Island platform, doors on the right/left
Level; Ε1	Platform 3	towards Alexandroupoli (Nikiforos) →

== Turntable ==
It is noteworthy that a few stations on the line had a turntable, that of Thessaloniki and Drama.
