= Thessaloniki–Alexandroupolis railway =

Railway line in Greece

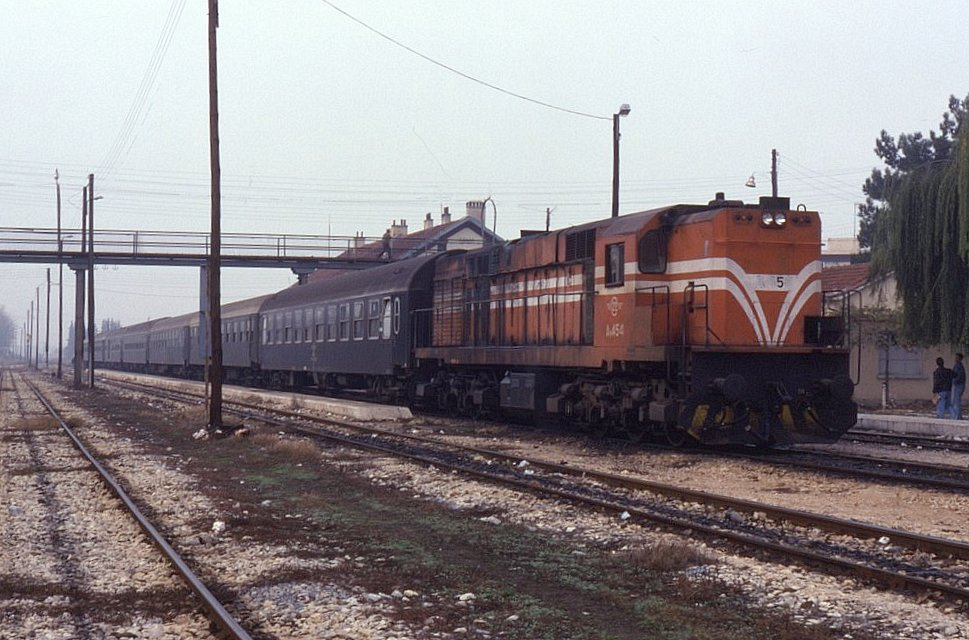
- The 21:00 Athens-Ormenio service at Drama (5 November 1992).

Overview
- Status: Fully operational
- Owner: GAIAOSE
- Locale: Greece (Central Macedonia, East Macedonia and Thrace)
- Termini: Thessaloniki 40.6444°N 22.9294°E; Alexandroupolis 40.8469°N 25.8844°E
- Stations: 45

Service
- Type: railway line
- Services: Regional and Intercity
- Operator(s): Hellenic Train

History
- Opened: 1896

Technical
- Line length: 440.1 km (273.5 mi)
- Number of tracks: single track
- Track gauge: 1,435 mm (4 ft 8 1/2 in) standard gauge
- Electrification: No
- Operating speed: 130 km/h (81 mph) (highest)

The Thessaloniki–Alexandroupolis railway is an about 440 km (270 mi) long railway in northern Greece connecting the Central Macedonian city of Thessaloniki with Alexandroupolis in Eastern Macedonia and Thrace, via Serres. There is a connection towards Sofia at the Strymonas station. This railway was built in 1896 by The Compagnie du Chemin de Fer Ottoman Jonction Salonique-Constantinople (JSC).

Currently (2004), the line is used exclusively for freight transport, with the exception of one round trip between Thessaloniki and Drama as well as special services, the extension from Alexandroupolis to Ormenio is still in use, with replacement buses connecting Drama to Alexandroupolis.

== Course ==
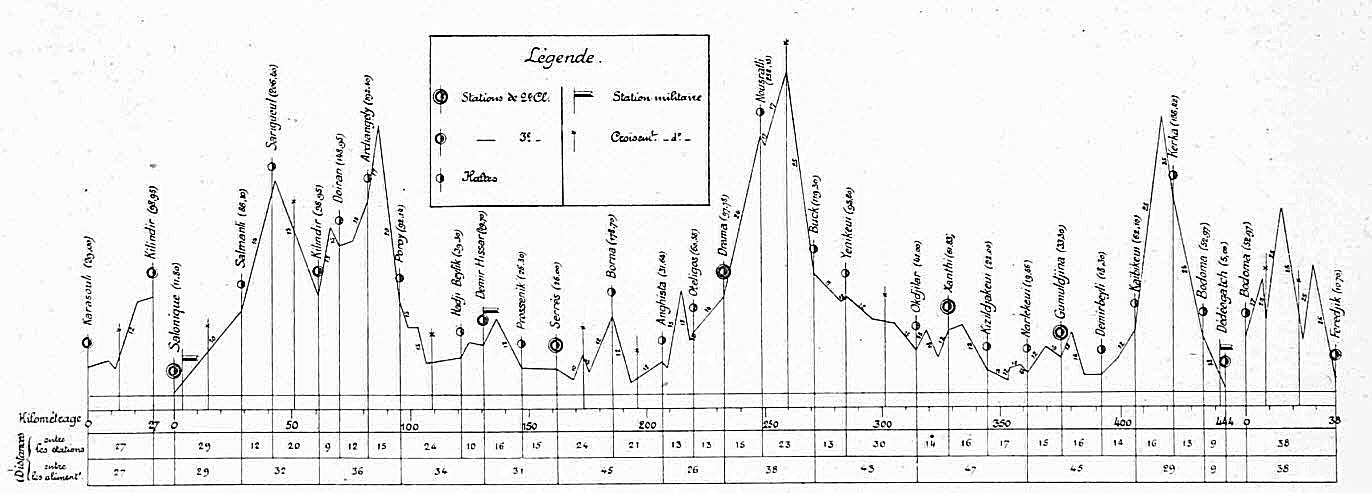
JSC line profile

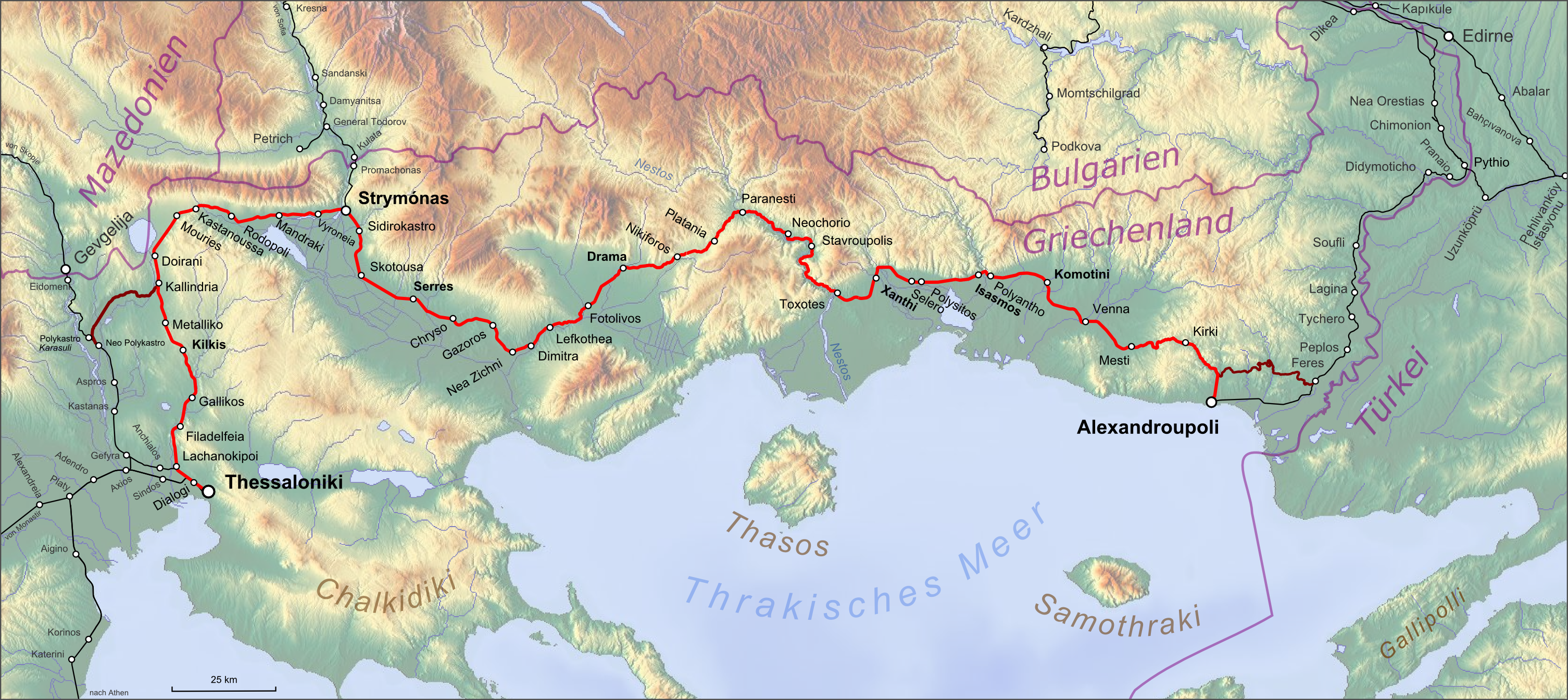
Route map of the old Chemin de Fer Jonction Salonique–Constantinople.

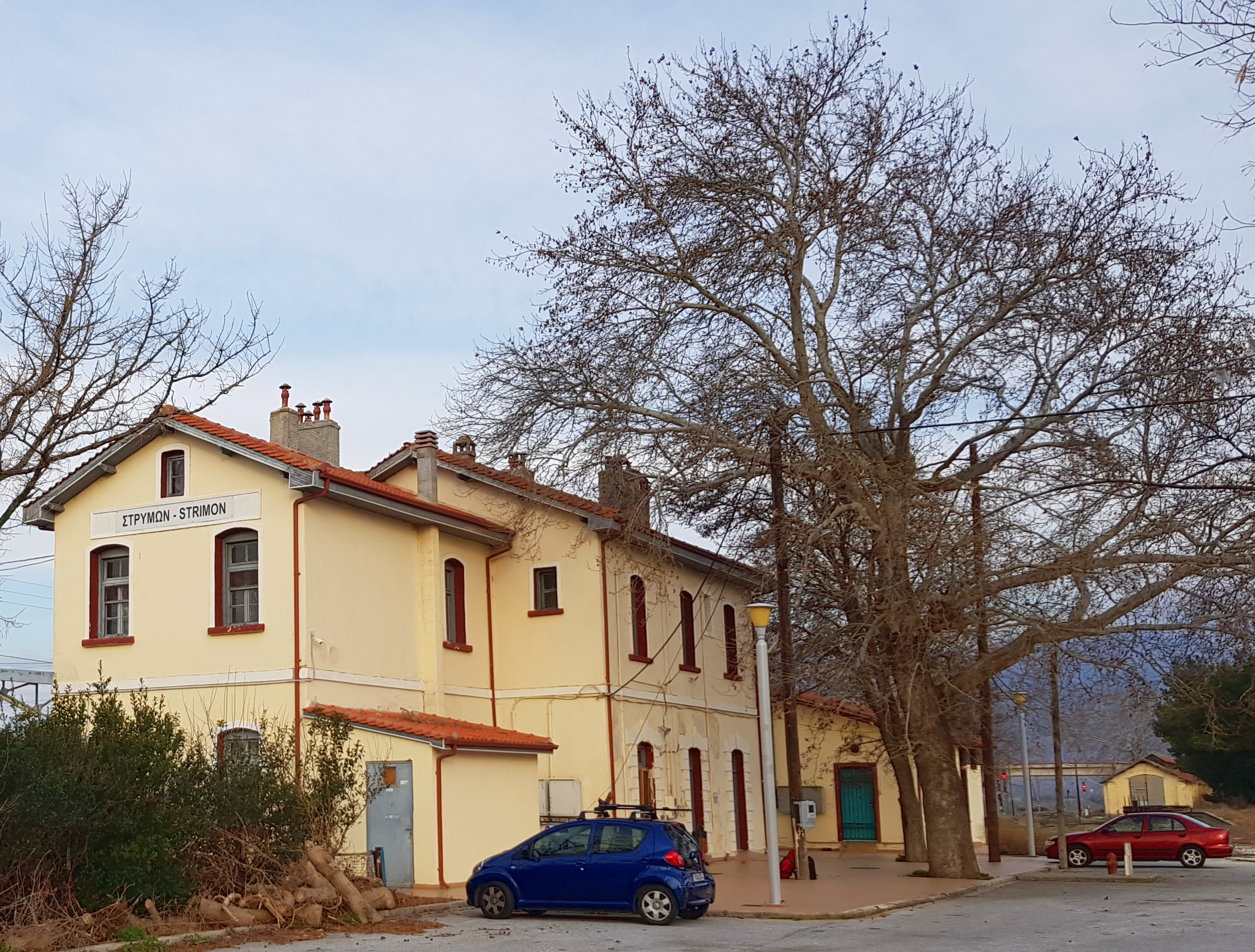
Strimon(as) railway station (Σταθμός). The line to the Bulgarian capital Sofia branches off here, alas services as far as Kulata have been suspended since 2018.

The western terminus of the Thessaloniki–Svilengrad railway is the New Railway Station, Thessaloniki. It runs north, passing Kilkis, until it turns east at the shore of Dojran Lake. It runs along the north shore of Lake Kerkini, and crosses the river Strymonas near Sidirokastro. The line north to Sofia (border crossing Promachonas/Kulata) branches off here. The railway continues east along Serres and Drama. It crosses the river Nestos at Paranesti and follows it until Toxotes. It passes Xanthi and Komotini, and reaches the Aegean Sea at Alexandroupolis, where it ends at the Alexandroupolis railway station, which is further connected to Pythio via the Alexandroupolis–Svilengrad railway

The line is single line. On the whole, the route has 36 tunnels and 251 bridges. It follows a particularly scenic route. The route first leads through a small pass where, at 320 metres (1,050 ft) above sea level, it reaches the highest point between Thessaloniki and Alexandroupolis before descending into the valley of the Nestos River.

The original track was built for vehicles with 13 tonnes (13 long tons; 14 short tons) axle load. The maximum gradients were below 20‰ with one section of 25 km (16 mi) reaching 25‰; the original rails had a weight of 30 kg/m (60 lb/yd) except in large gradients sections where the rails had a weight of 34 kg/m (69 lb/yd). The steel sleepers used weighed 50 kg (110 lb).

In 2018, the superstructure of the 116 km (72 mi) Thessaloniki-Serres section consisted of UIC 54 rails laid on B70 concrete sleepers. On the remaining 326 km (203 mi) to Alexandroupolis, rails with UIC 50 or UIC 54 profiles are laid on wooden, steel or bi-block concrete sleepers. The route between Thessaloniki and Strymonas is now suitable for 22.5 tonnes (22.1 long tons; 24.8 short tons) axle load and can be used at 160 km/h (100 mph). The remainder of the section is for 20 tonnes (20 long tons; 22 short tons) of axle load.

== History ==
The Société du Chemin de Fer Ottoman Jonction Salonique-Constantinople, abbreviated JSC, was founded in October 1892. This company obtained, on September 10, 1892, the concession to build and operate a railway 442 km (275 mi) line between Thessaloniki and Alexandroupolis, named Dedeagatch at the time. In Alexandroupolis, the line would join the existing line to Constantinople and Edirne, via Pythio, operated by the Chemins de fer Orientaux. The JSC was formed according to Ottoman law with its main office in Istanbul and the shareholder committee in Paris.

The line fulfilled the strategic goal of a direct connection from Constantinople to Thessaloniki, by-passing Serbian or Bulgarian territories. Thessaloniki was (since 1888) connected with Constantinople by the Chemins de fer Orientaux, but this connection went through the before-mentioned countries, which were once part of the Ottoman Empire but split off at a later stage. The line was carefully built away from the border and the coast to avoid destruction by warfare. Except near Alexandroupolis the minimum distance from enemy countries and the sea was 15 km (9 mi) in order to keep the route out of artillery and gunboat fire reach. Alexandroupolis received at a later stage a bypass route in the North of the town, fulfilling the original requirement. This route had several horseshoe curves to master the steep grades in the geographic wise difficult country and is today closed and razed. Also, Thessaloniki received a Northern bypass, which connected the station Kallindria with Karasuli on the line to Mitrovica.

Under the guidance of the Ministry of War the concessionaires were obliged to build 26 stations. Some of them were military stations equipped with all the necessary facilities for the prompt embarkation and disembarkation of troops and war materials. Furthermore, the company was obliged to own and maintain at least 848 wagons; namely: 90 passenger carriages of three classes; 30 baggage wagons; 528 boxcars; 200 gondolas. The boxcars and gondolas must be capable of transporting troops, horses and cattle, guns, etc., so that 27 complete trains can be organised – one more train than the number of stations. For the transport of soldiers, 130 of the 200 gondolas should be capable of being covered as quickly as possible if required. Furthermore, the railway had to keep sufficient benches in the store to allow the soldiers to sit during the transport.

In 1895, The Swiss Bank für Orientalische Eisenbahnen purchased 30000 stocks out of 100000 issued, giving it a minority shareholding. Bank für Orientalische Eisenbahnen was also the owner of the Chemins de fer Orientaux and of the Salonica Monastir Railway. The main objective of the Chemins de fer Orientaux was to secure an alternate route between Serbia and Istanbul through Greece should the main route through Bulgaria be closed by the Bulgarian government. After the end of Balkan Wars in 1913, the line ended fully in Greek territory. The Greek government purchased the JSC in 1920, and the railway became part of the Hellenic State Railways.

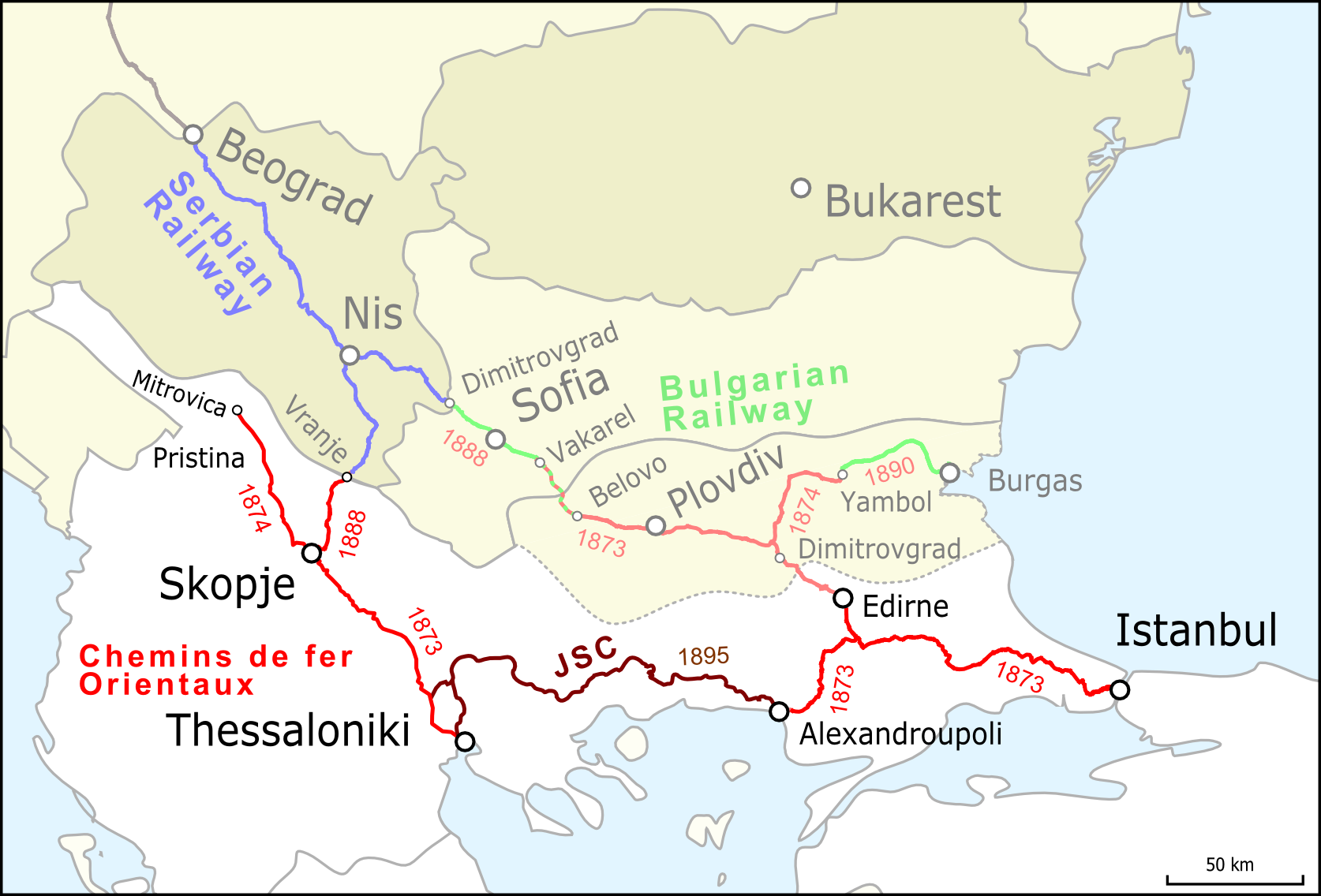
JSC in 1895

== Locomotives ==
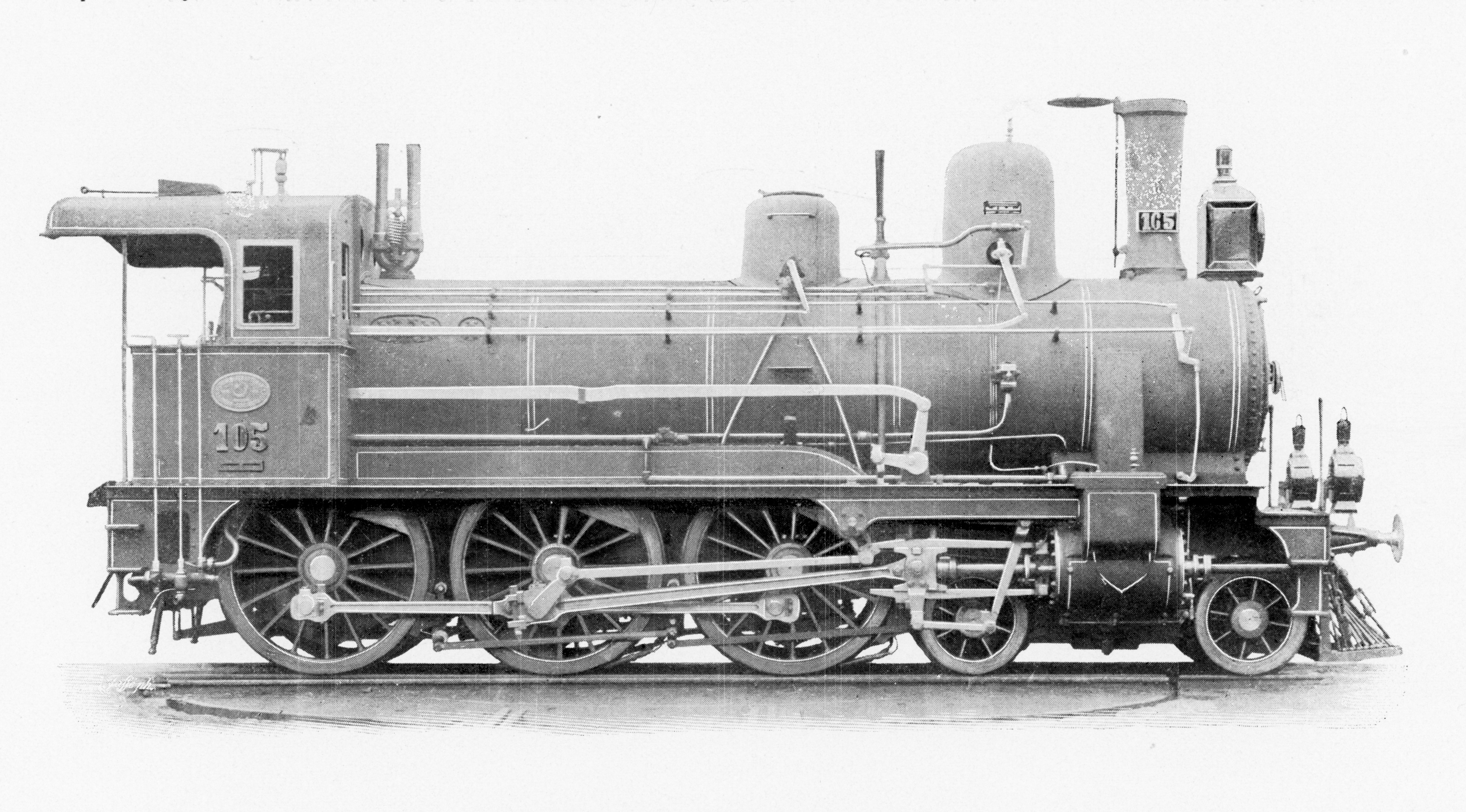
JSC passenger train locomotive 101 to 111

Locomotives from the JSC

Number	Manufacturer	Qty	Year	Type	Comments	Picture
1 to 16	WrN; SLM	16		D	Became SEK class Hβ	
50 to 54	WrN	4		C	became SEK class Δγ 71 to 75	
101 to 111	StEG	11		2'C	10 Became SEK class Zγ 321 to 330	

== Services ==
The Thessaloniki–Alexandroupolis railway is used by the following passenger services:

- Intercity and regular services Thessaloniki–Drama.

Due to the overdue necessary maintenance, the line has been partially closed for passenger routes, with the Drama Alexandroupolis section operating with OSE buses and commercial trains only. There are plans for Drama-Toxotes to be included in the tourist itineraries. Due to these events, the southern route through Kavala, from Thessaloniki to Alexandroupolis, is promoted. Construction contractor for the variant is expected in late 2023.

== See also ==
- Chemins de fer Orientaux
- French-Hellenic Railway Company (CFFH)
- Egnatia Railway
