= Greek railways rolling stock =

Rolling stock in Greece comprises the railway vehicles used for passenger and freight operations on the Greek railway network. It is broadly categorized into three main types: motive power (tractive rolling stock), unpowered (hauled) rolling stock, and multiple units.

Locomotives constitute the motive power. They are self-propelled vehicles used to haul passenger or freight trains. Depending on their power supply and transmission type, they are classified into electric locomotives and diesel-electric locomotives. Electric locomotives draw electric power from the network's overhead line equipment (catenary), whereas diesel-electric locomotives utilize an onboard genset (a diesel engine driving an electric generator) to power their traction motors.

Hauled (unpowered) rolling stock consists of vehicles without independent traction power, which are pulled by locomotives. This category includes passenger coaches (carriages), used for passenger transport, and freight wagons (freight cars), used for the carriage of goods.

Multiple units are passenger trainsets with integrated traction power, requiring no separate locomotive. They are categorized into electric multiple units (EMU) and diesel-electric or diesel-hydraulic multiple units (DMU).

On the electrified sections of the Greek railway network, the standard European 25 kV AC, 50 Hz overhead catenary electrification system is used.

== Ownership and management ==
The rolling stock operating on Greece's national railway network is owned by various entities. A significant portion is state-owned property managed by Hellenic Railways S.A. (Sidirodromoi Ellados S.A.), while railway undertakings operating on the network may utilize either privately owned or leased rolling stock.

Historically, the majority of the rolling stock was associated with the Hellenic Railways Organisation (OSE). For several years, TrainOSE operated using leased state-owned rolling stock, with the fleet's management and commercial exploitation transferred to GAIAOSE under Law 4313/2014. In October 2025, a Joint Ministerial Decision transferred railway rolling stock management activities from GAIAOSE to Hellenic Railways S.A.

State-owned rolling stock, largely inherited from the former OSE fleet, may be leased or allocated to licensed railway undertakings holding the necessary safety certificates and infrastructure access agreements. Railway undertakings such as Hellenic Train, Goldair Rail, and GFR Hellas utilize such rolling stock to operate passenger or freight services. Additionally, Hellenic Train has placed an order for 25 new electric trainsets—part of an investment program scheduled for delivery in Greece by 2027—aimed at fleet renewal.

The following tables detail the types of rolling stock operating on the Greek railway network.

== Active rolling in Greece ==
=== Locomotives ===
Class	Model	Year	QTY	In use	Transmission	Power output	Maximum Speed	Weight	Length	Photo
120	Siemens / KraussMaffei ES64P HellasSprinter	2004-05	30	16	E	5000 kW	200 km/h	80t	19,5 m	
220	Adtranz / Bombardier DE2000	1997 & 2003-04	36	23	DE	984 kW	160 km/h	80t	19,4 m	
A 9500	Schöma	1999	2	1	M	240 kW	40 km/h			
A 450 A 500	MLW CC MX-627 MLW CC MX-636	1973 (2004-2011 reconstruction) 1975 (2001-2004 reconstruction)	20 10	14 5	DE	1983 kW 2647 kW	120 km/h 112 km/h	120t 124t	17,7 m 19,3 m	

Note: Includes withdrawn types (QTY indicates the number of delivered units)

=== Trainsets ===
Class	Model	Year	QTY	In use	Tramsmission	Power output	Maximum speed	Weight	Length	Photo
3107	Stadler BDmh 2Z+4A/12	2007	4	4	DE	420 kW	25/60 km/h	55t	34,9 m	
460	Siemens/Hellenic Shipyards Desiro Electric	2006	20	16	E	2000 kW	160 km/h	161 t	89,3 m	
560 4500	Stadler/Bombardier GTW 2/6	2003 2004	17 12	9 8	DE	400 kW	115 km/h 100 km/h	56t 54t	35,1 m	
ETR 470	Alstom ETR470	1996 (2022 reconstruction)	9	0 (Mothballed)	E	4900 kW	200 km/h	450 t	236,6 m	
621	Bombardier/Hellenic Shipyards MAN2000	2006	15	13	DH	768 kW	125 km/h	102t	47,2 m	
?	Alstom Coradia Stream	2027	23(12 IC + 11 Reg)	0 (23 ordered)	E		160 km/h			
?	Hitachi Rail HTR 412	2026	2	0	Hybrid		160 km/h		86,08 m	

== See also ==
- Hellenic Railways Organisation
- Hellenic Train
- Railways of Greece
