= Rail transport in Greece =

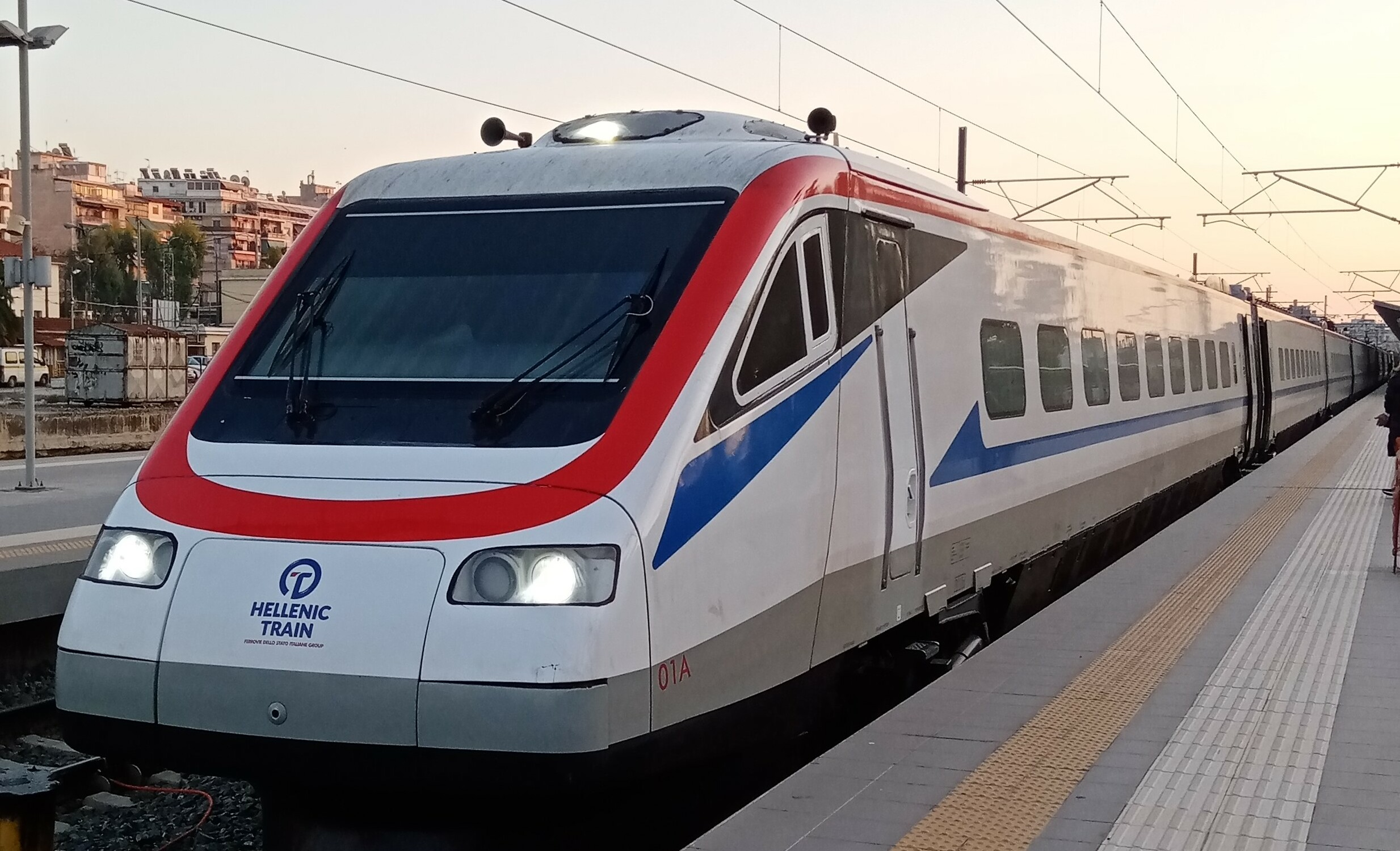
- ETR 470 in Hellenic Train livery

Operation
- Infrastructure company: Greek Railways
- Major operators: Hellenic Train; PEARL; Rail Cargo Logistics Goldair; Grup Feroviar Român Hellas

Statistics
- Ridership: 19,599,000 (2019)
- Passenger-distance: 1.252 billion (2019)
- Freight: 538 million tonne-km

System length
- Total: 2,240 kilometres (1,390 mi)
- Double track: 524 km (326 mi)
- Electrified: 532 km (331 mi)

Track gauge
- Main: 1,435 mm (4 ft 8 1/2 in) standard gauge
- 1,000 mm (3 ft 3 3/8 in) metre gauge: 787 km (489.0 mi)
- 750 mm (2 ft 5 1/2 in): 22.3 km (13.9 mi)
- 600 mm (1 ft 11 5/8 in): 15 km (9.3 mi)

Electrification
- Main: 25 kV 50 Hz

Features
- Longest tunnel: Kallidromo Tunnel 9.6 km (5.97 mi)
- Max elevation: Kalogeriko at 814 metres (2,671 ft)

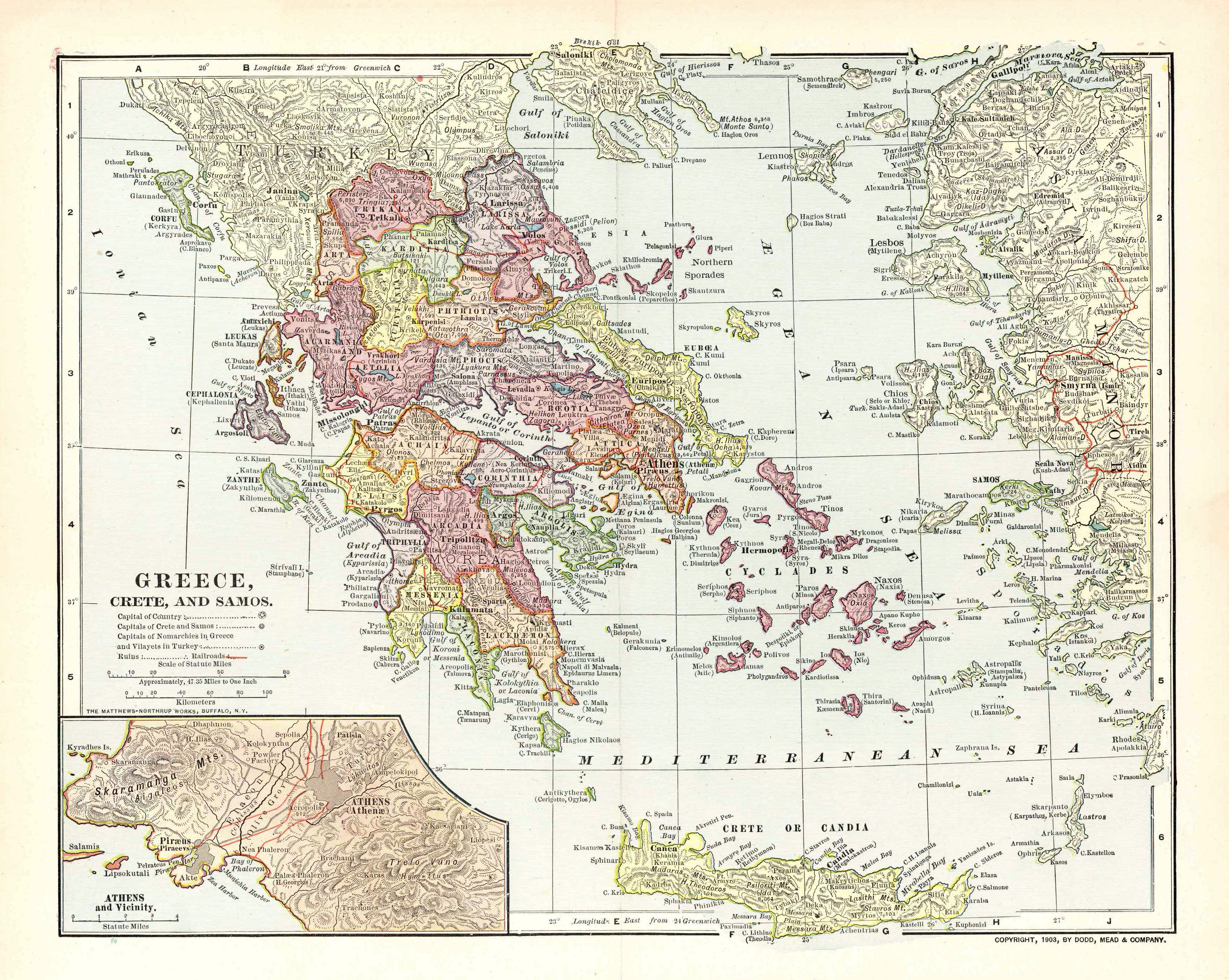
Map showing the Greek railway system c.1901–1902.

Rail transport in Greece has a history which began in 1869, with the completion of the then Athens–Piraeus Railway. From the 1880s to the 1920s, the majority of the network was built, reaching its heyday in 1940. From the 1950s onward, the railway system entered a period of decline, culminating in service cuts in 2011. Ever since the 1990s, the network has been steadily modernized and upgraded, but still remains smaller than its peak length.

The operation of the Greek railway network is split between the Greek Railways (SE), which owns, manages and maintains the track infrastructure and rolling stock, and Hellenic Train, which is the sole operator of passenger services in the network, as well as the primary operator of freight services alongside other smaller private companies.

Until 2025, the former Hellenic Railways Organisation (OSE) owned track infrastructure, ERGOSE was responsible for construction projects and GAIAOSE owned the buildings and other real estate of the network, as well as its rolling stock. The former two were merged into Greek Railways, which also absorbed GAIAOSE's rolling stock division, transforming the rest of the company exclusively into a property management company.

Greece is a member of the International Union of Railways (UIC). The UIC Country Code for Greece is 73.

Former logo of Hellenic Train (then TrainOSE)

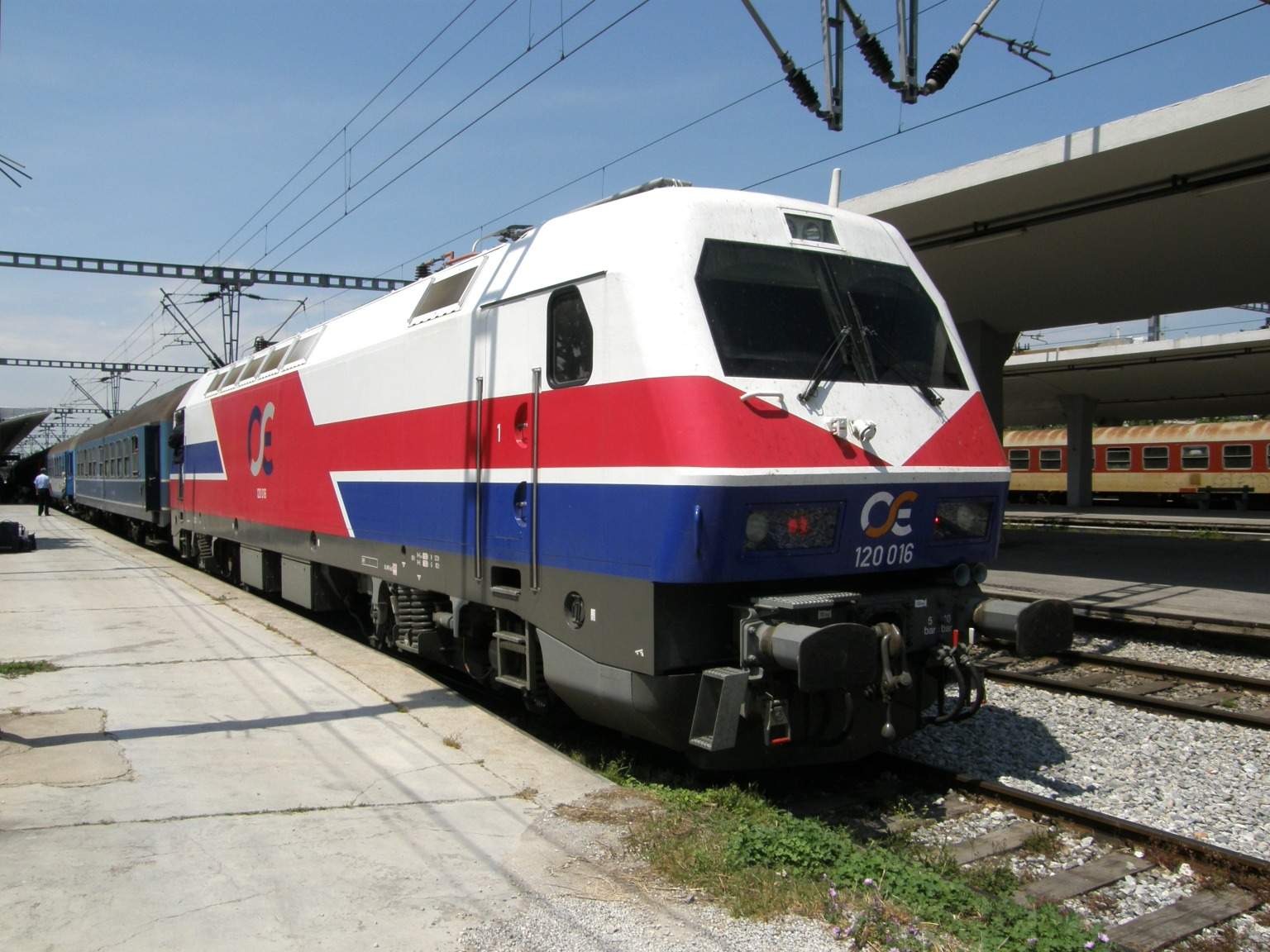
An electric locomotive in Thessaloniki Station.

== History ==
=== Ancient Greece ===
The Diolkos was a paved trackway near Corinth in Ancient Greece which enabled boats to be moved overland across the Isthmus of Corinth. The shortcut allowed ancient vessels to avoid the dangerous circumnavigation of the Peloponnese peninsula. It is regarded by the British historian of science M.J.T. Lewis, author of Early Wooden Railways, as the first railway (as defined as a track to direct vehicles so they may not leave the track) to ever be constructed.

=== The beginnings (1869 – 1919) ===
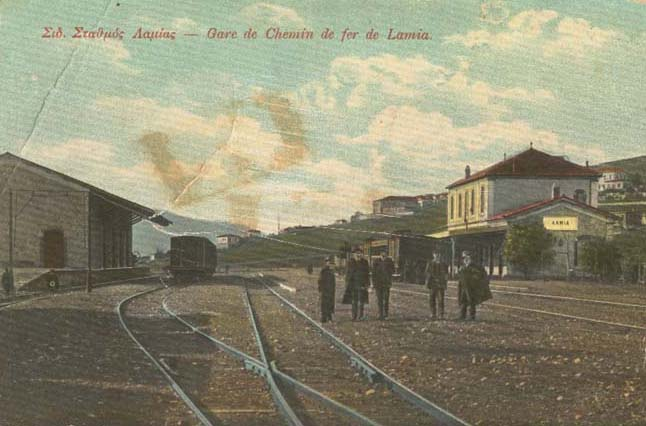
Lamia station c.1910.

Bralos station during World War I.

Greek independence in 1832 coincided with the start of the railway era. By 1835 plans were being put to the Greek state to construct a railway line from Athens to the port of Piraeus. Twenty-two years later, in 1857, a contract for its construction was signed and the work commenced. It took four different companies a further twelve years to lay the 8.8 kilometres (5.5 mi) of track, the work being completed in 1869.

Greece during the 19th century was a collection of small agricultural towns acting as marketplaces and economic centres for the villages that surrounded them. Greece had very little industry and few roads, which made the government think about the development of a railway system that would go towards addressing the lack of internal and external communication that existed. In 1881 the Prime Minister, Alexandros Koumoundouros signed four contracts for the laying of 1,435 mm (4 ft 8 1/2 in) standard gauge lines, with the intention of making Greece a pivotal point on the journey between Europe, India and Asia.

In the following year, 1882, Koumoundouros was replaced by Charilaos Trikoupis as Prime Minister, who cancelled the contracts, replacing them with four of his own. He had a different political vision for the railways, seeing them as a way of stimulating the internal growth of Greece, rather than international connections, and proposed a 417 kilometres (259 mi) narrow-gauge (1,000 mm (3 ft 3 3/8 in)) system encircling the northern Peloponnese, with a separate system in Thessaly; linking the port of Volos with the town of Kalambaka on the other side of the Thessalian plain. There was also a line of 76 kilometres (47 mi) to be laid from Athens to Lavrio, on the peninsula of Eastern Attica. Trikoupis preferred narrow gauge over standard gauge due to cheaper initial construction costs, although the line linking Athens to Larissa, which was planned to eventually join with the European system, was constructed to 1,435 mm (4 ft 8 1/2 in) standard gauge. The network took 25 years to complete, 20 years longer than the 5 anticipated by Trikoupis.

Railway companies that arose during this era include:

- Piraeus, Athens and Peloponnese Railways (SPAP), which operated the system in the Peloponnese.
- Thessaly Railways, which operated the railways in Thessaly.
- Attica Railways, which operated the railways in Attica.
- Railways of Northwestern Greece, which operated the railway line in Aetolia-Acarnania, between Kryoneri and Agrinio.

By 1909, 1,606 kilometres (998 mi) of track had been laid, including the main standard-gauge line to the then Greek-Ottoman border at Papapouli, past the Vale of Tempe, approx. 400 km north of Athens. The first trains to run the full 506 kilometres from Athens to Thessaloniki on standard-gauge track marked the completion of the line in 1918, which by then was running entirely on Greek territory, following gains made the Balkan Wars and World War I.

=== Integration of networks (1920 – 1970) ===
During the 1920s the Greek railway network was split between a number of companies – private and public – with the most important being the SPAP and the newly-founded state-owned SEK (Hellenic State Railways). Eventually the SPAP integrated most railways in southern Greece and the SEK those in northern Greece; in 1953 SPAP acquired the Railways of Northwestern Greece, while Thessaly Railways were nationalized and absorbed into the SEK in 1955. The consolidation was completed with the nationalization of SPAP in 1962, and its merger with SEK. Due to the immense financial and social pressure during the interwar period not much railway construction happened. Important construction projects in the 1920s and 1930s include the expansion of the Piraeus-Thisseio Railway towards the centre of Athens via a long tunnel, the attempted extension of the Palaiofarsalos–Kalambaka Railway towards Grevena and Kozani and the construction of the Nea Zichni–Amphipolis railway line. Most of the railway infrastructure was completely destroyed during the Second World War, the subsequent occupation and following civil war, resulting in much of the post-war era being devoted into rebuilding it. The only noteworthy expansion between 1940 and 1971 was the building of a new railway line as an extension of the Thessaloniki–Florina railway, connecting Amyntaio, Ptolemaida and Kozani, as well as the regauging of the Larissa–Volos railway to standard gauge.

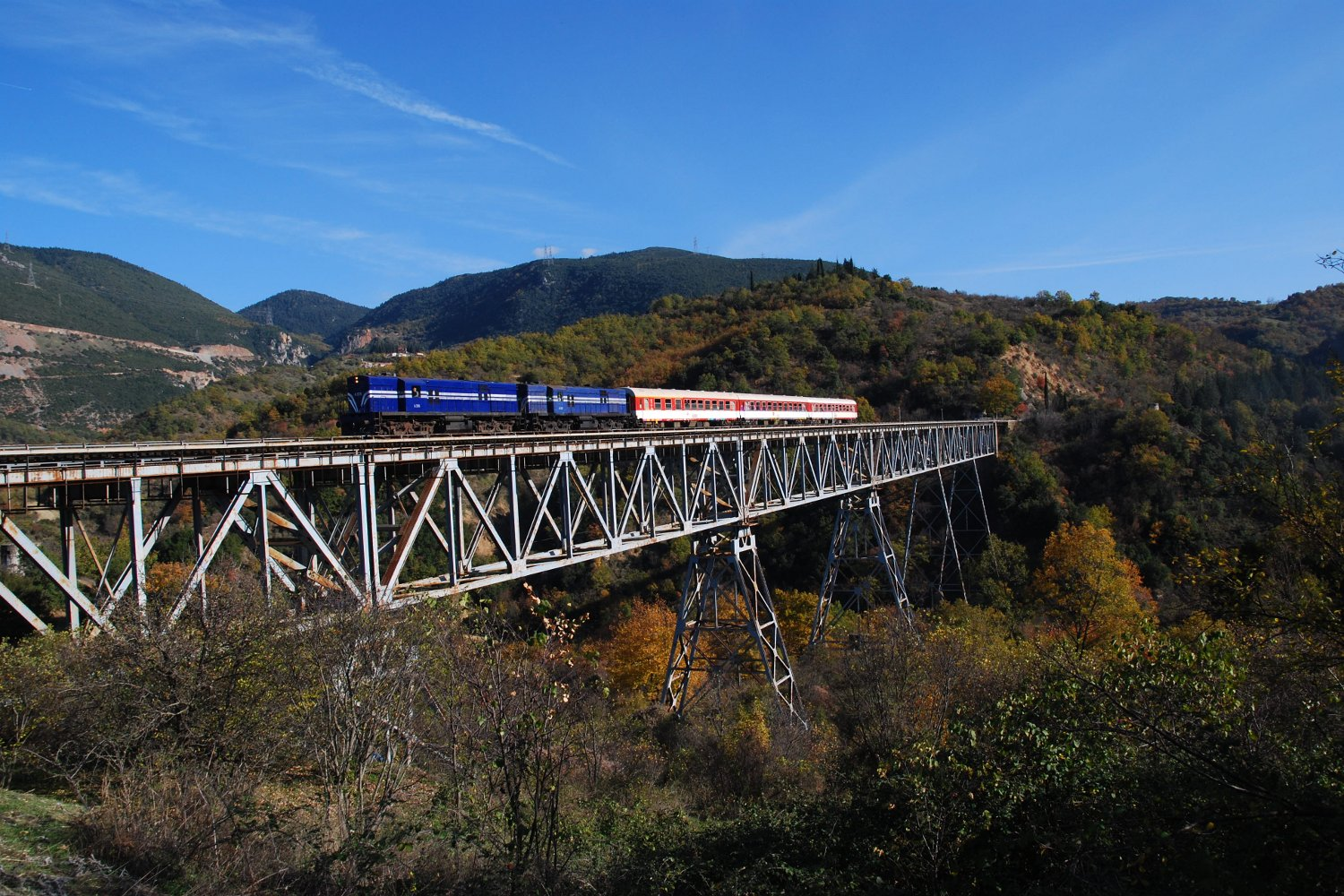
Bralos (or Papadia) bridge, rebuilt in 1945.

=== Modern era (1971 – present) ===
The Hellenic Railways Organisation (OSE) was founded in 1971, taking over from the Hellenic State Railways. Many services were cut in the 1980s, in particular the metre gauge network, only to be reinstated during the 1990s but then to be cut again in 2011 with the debt crisis. Since then, the network of Greece's standard railways has been extensively modernised and most of them have been electrified, notably between the cities of Athens and Thessaloniki, between Athens and Kiato and in the vicinity of Athens.

In 2016 the state-owned passenger and freight train operator, TrainOSE, was privatized. It was sold to the Italian FS (Ferrovie dello Stato Italiane) group, owned by the Government of Italy and train operator in the country, for 50 million euros. The operating company was renamed Hellenic Train in 2022. Moreover two new freight train operators, PEARL and Rail Cargo Logistics Goldair, have begun operations with the goal of transporting cargo between Piraeus and Central Europe.

In August 2025, the Ministry of Infrastructure and Transport confirmed the creation of a new body, Greek Railways (SE) (Greek: Σιδηρόδρομοι Ελλάδος (ΣΕ), romanized: Ellinikoí Sidiródromoi Monoprósopi) to assume responsibility for rail infrastructure, planning, modernisation projects, and rolling stock across Greece. Previously, these functions were divided among several state-owned entities: OSE, which managed and owned track infrastructure; ERGOSE, responsible for construction projects; and GAIAOSE, which owned stations, buildings, and rolling stock. OSE had overseen both infrastructure and operations until its vertical separation in 2005. Rail safety has been identified as a key priority. The merger follows the July approval of a Parliamentary Bill to restructure the national railway system, a direct response to the Tempi accident of February 2023, in which 57 people died after a head-on collision.

=== Old urban railways of Athens (1869 – 1938 – present) ===
The first railway line that operated in Greece connected Athens and its port Piraeus and opened in 1869 under Athens–Piraeus Railways S.A. It ran for a distance of 8 km from the port of Piraeus to Thiseio in center of Athens. It was later extended to Omonoia Square in 1895 through a tunnel section and electrified in 1904, with a 600 V DC third rail system, at which point it transitioned from a regional to a metropolitan railway. From 1911 it was also possible to run through freight trains on the Piraeus Harbour Tramway using dual system electric locomotives.

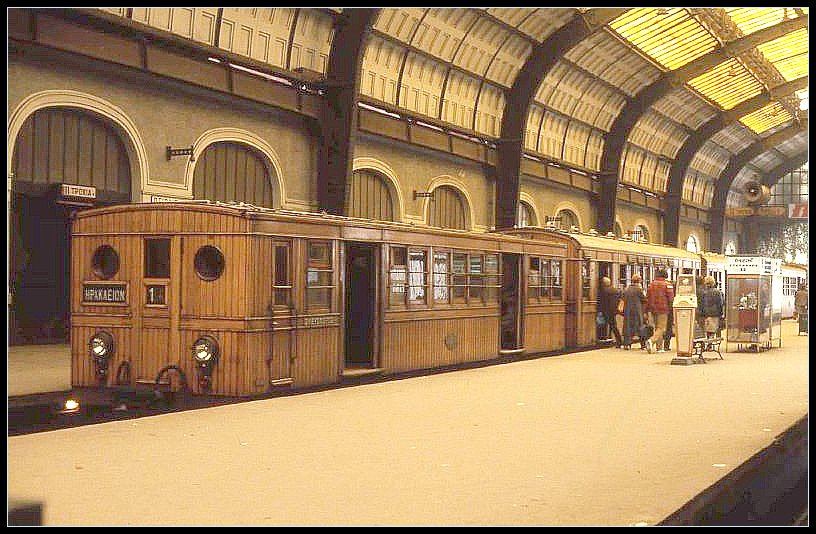
First generation EIS EMU at Piraeus station.

Another company, Attica Railways in 1885, ran a metre-gauge suburban line from Lavrio Square in downtown Athens towards Irakleio (a northern suburb). It involved a section of street running, along the present 3 September Street, from Lavrio Square to Attiki Square, beyond which it ran on a dedicated trackbed. At Irakleio, the line forked to form two suburban branches. One went further north to Kifissia and Strofyli, with a freight-only extension to the Dionysos marble quarries. The other branch ran eastwards to Chalandri and then southwards to the towns of Paiania, Koropi, Markopoulo, Kalyvia, Keratea and its terminus at the mining and port town of Lavrio.

In 1926, the Hellenic Electric Railways (EIS), a new company created as a subsidiary of the British "Power Group" following an agreement with the Greek State, absorbed Attica Railways and took over operation of the Piraeus–Athens and Omonia–Attiki–Kifissia–Strofyli lines. The Irakleio–Lavrio branch was not included in this agreement, and in 1929 SPAP were forced to take over its operation. Thus, the Athens terminal for Lavrio was moved from Lavrio Square to Athens Peloponnese Station. To join the Lavrio line to its network, SPAP built a connection between Agioi Anargyroi (Kato Liosia) and Irakleio in 1931. The Lavrio line was eventually closed in 1957, due to long-term disinvestment and political pressures from the motor lobby.

The line from Attiki Square to Kifissia operated as a steam locomotive hauled railway with numerous level crossings until 1938. The line was subsequently closed and rebuilt to metro standards, as electrified dual track standard gauge without level crossings, connected to the electrified Athens-Piraeus (EIS) line at Omonoia, and reopened to Kifissia in 1957. The extension to Strofyli was abandoned. The line later became Line 1 of the Athens Metro.

In 1976, EIS was nationalized and reorganized into the new Athens–Piraeus Electric Railways (ISAP), which was merged into the general metro operator STASY in 2011.

== Current status ==
The network infrastructure and rolling stock are owned, managed and maintained by Greek Railways, and passenger services are exclusively operated by Hellenic Train, alongside and other smaller companies which run freight trains on the network.

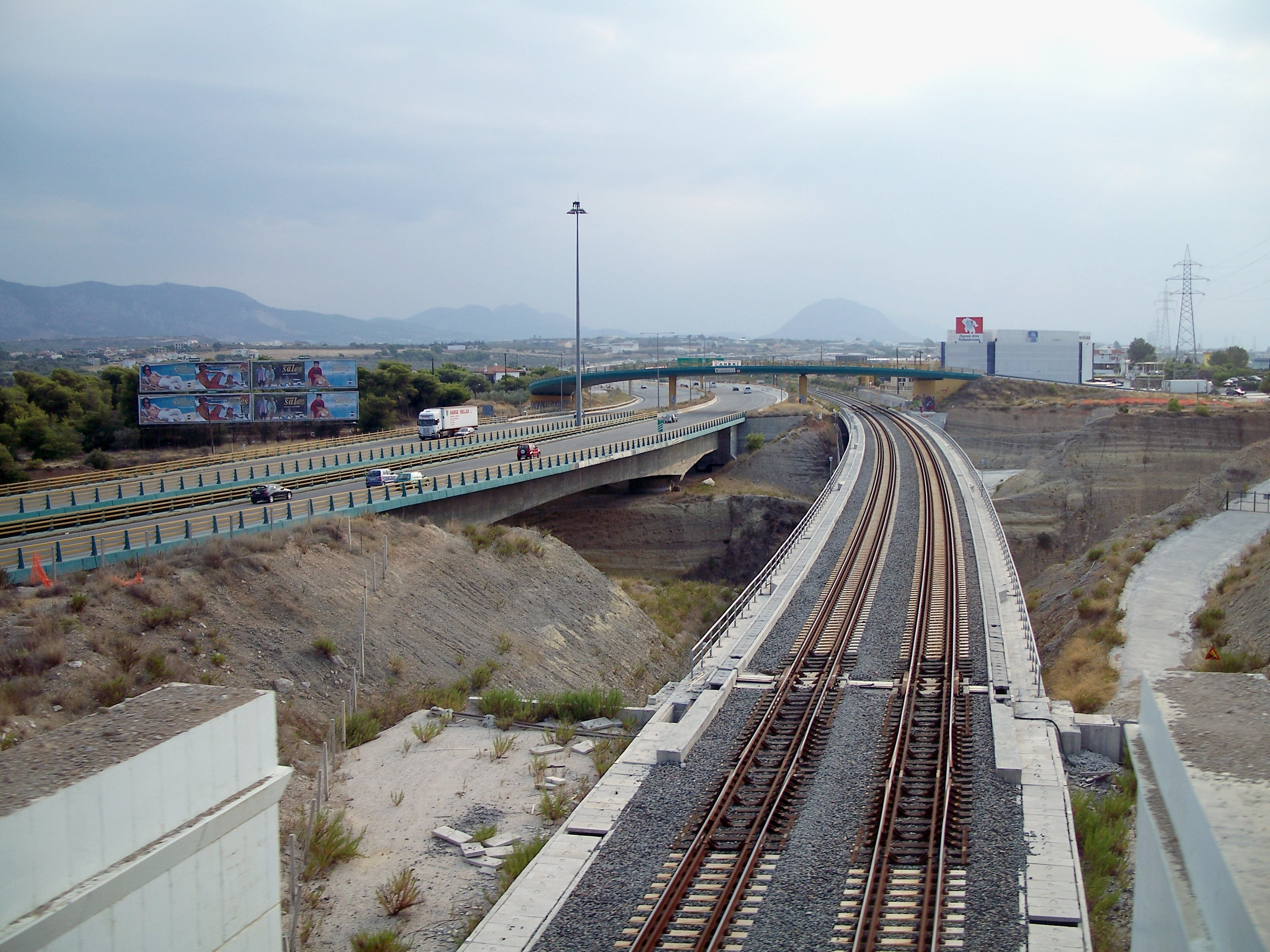
The rail bridge over the Isthmus of Corinth.

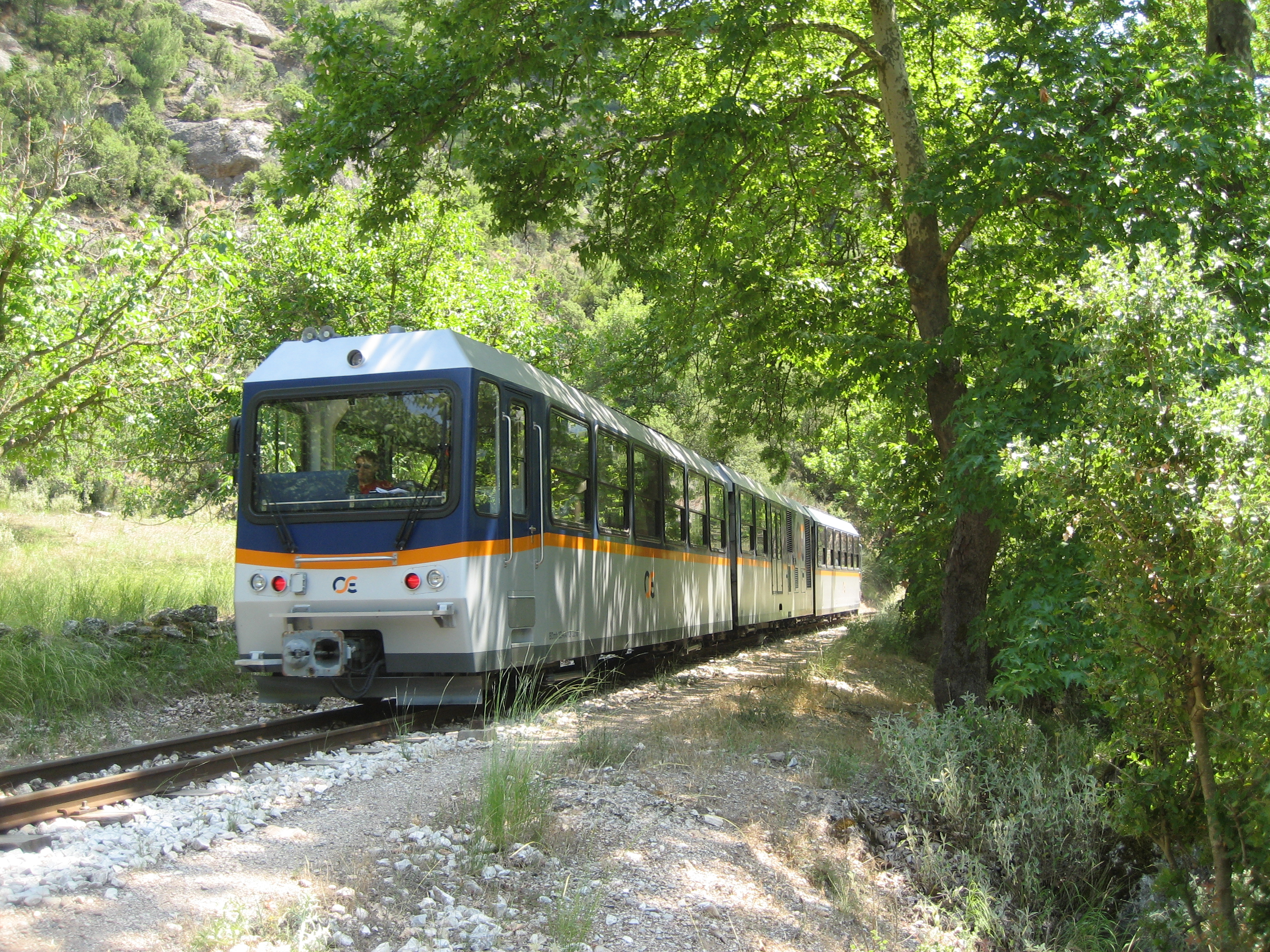
Diakofto-Kalavryta railway.

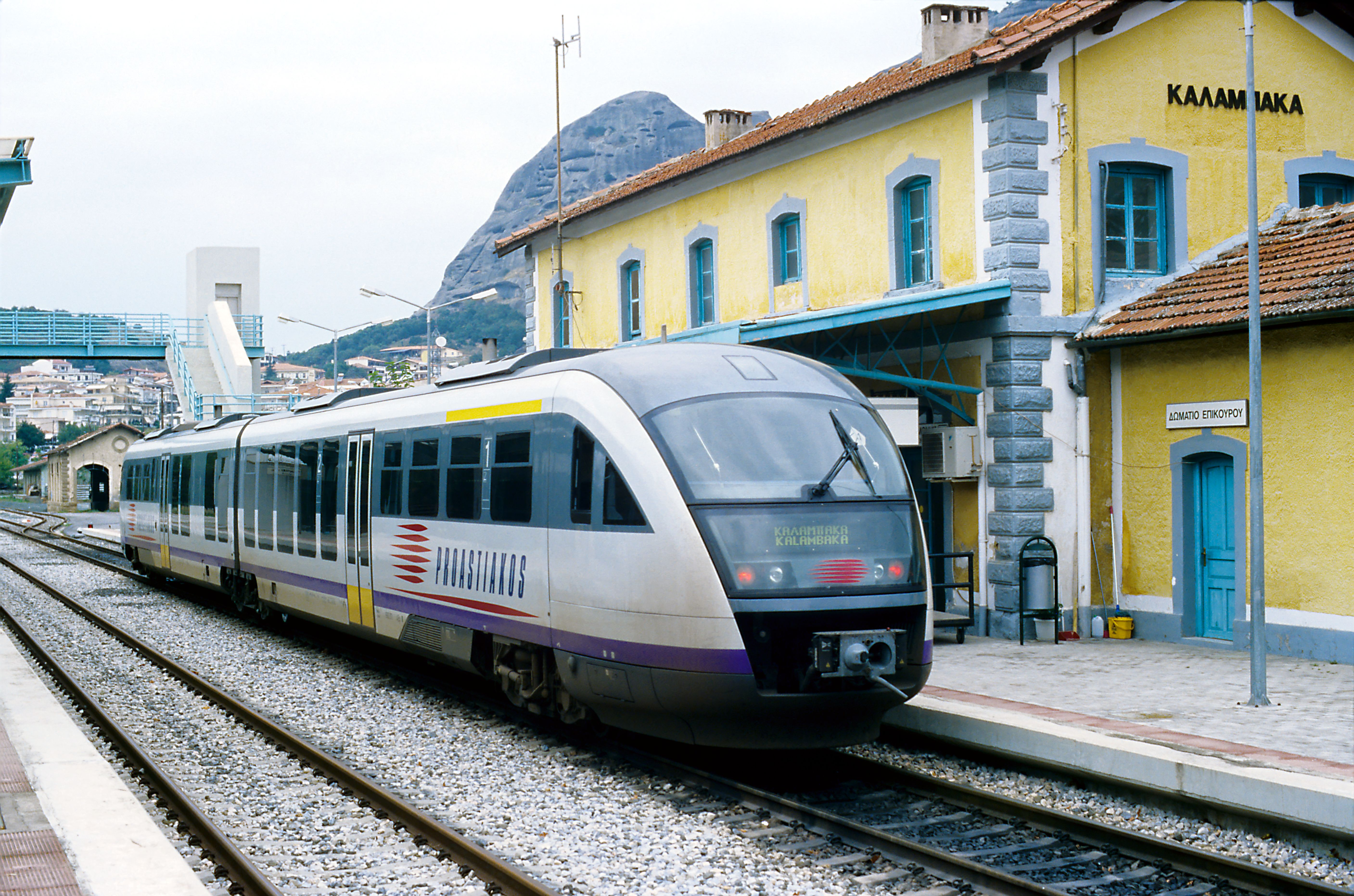
Diesel multiple OSE class 660.

=== Lines ===
==== Primary rail network ====
- The Piraeus–Platy railway (with its numerous branch lines, most importantly to Thessaloniki). The line has been modernized and is now fully electrified and double-tracked. It is the busiest passenger and freight line in the country. It serves many important towns and cities in mainland Greece such as Athens, Thebes, Lamia, Larissa, Katerini and Thessaloniki. Used by all types of railway services.
- The Athens Airport–Patras railway which is electrified until Kiato and double-tracked throughout. It passes through west Attica and the northern coast of the Peloponnese. Some major cities located on the line include Eleusis, Megara, Corinth and Aigio. Used by commuter/regional services, with intercity and freight services planned in the future. The final section, from Aigio to Patras, is under construction and due for completion by 2028.
- The Thessaloniki–Alexandroupolis railway, the second longest in the country, which is non-electrified and single-track. Major towns and cities on the line include Kilkis, Serres, Drama, Xanthi, Komotini and Alexandroupoli. The section between Thessaloniki and Drama is served by regional services, and it is planned to be upgraded and electrified up to Serres, with a completion date of 2032. The section between Drama and Alexandroupoli has been largely unused since 2019, due to the poor state of the track, although it may occasionally be used by limited freight services. It is planned to be largely replaced by the Egnatia Railway.

==== Secondary rail network ====
- The Thessaloniki–Bitola railway, branching from the Athens–Thessaloniki mainline at Platy to Florina, which includes its own branch in the form of the Kozani–Amyntaio railway line.
- The Alexandroupolis–Svilengrad railway, running parallel to the Evros River and the Turkish border. Important settlements on the line include Feres, Soufli, Didimotiho, Orestiada and Nea Vyssa. Used by all types of services.
- The Palaiofarsalos–Kalambaka railway, branching from the Athens–Thessaloniki mainline, which runs through western Thessaly, serving the towns and cities of Sofades, Karditsa, Trikala and Kalambaka. This line was converted from metre gauge to standard gauge in 2001.
- The Larissa–Volos railway, branching from the Athens–Thessaloniki mainline, which runs through eastern Thessaly, serving the villages of Kileler, Armenio and Velestino, and the city of Volos.
- The Oinoi–Chalcis railway, which is a branch of the Athens-Thessaloniki mainline used by Athens regional services. It serves the settlements of Oinoi, Avlida and Chalcis.
- The Leianokladi–Stylida railway, branching from the Athens-Thessaloniki mainline and used by local services serving the city of Lamia and its port town, Stylida.
- The Pelion railway, a seasonal, 600 mm (1 ft 11 5/8 in) narrow-gauge heritage line from Ano Lechonia to Milies.
- The Thessaloniki–Idomeni railway, which is electrified and single-track. It connects the Greek railway network to that of the rest of Europe through North Macedonia. Used only by freight services.
- The Peloponnese metre gauge (3 ft 3^{3}/_{8} in) railway network which has been largely unused since 2011. The network's main railway lines included:
  - The Piraeus–Patras railway, which served the northern Peloponnese and has been mostly replaced by the Athens Airport–Patras railway along the same route. The section between Rio and Patras remains in use by the Patras Suburban Railway.
  - The Patras–Kyparissia railway, which served the western Peloponnese. Major towns and cities along the route include Kato Achaia, Amaliada, Pyrgos, Zacharo and Kyparissia. The section between Patras and Kato Achaia remains in use by the Patras Suburban Railway. It is planned to be replaced by a modernized, double-track railway (as a continuation from Patras).
  - The Corinth–Kalamata railway, which served the central Peloponnese. Major towns and cities along the route include Argos (alongside a branch to Nafplio), Tripoli, Megalopolis, Meligalas and Kalamata (alongside a branch to Messini).
  - The Kavasila–Kyllini railway, branching from the Patras–Kyparissia line at Kavasila and which served the port of Kyllini. It also included its own branch line to Loutra Kylinis.
  - The Katakolo–Olympia railway, connecting with the Patras–Kyparissia line at Pyrgos and which remains in operation as a local and tourist service.
  - The Kalo Nero–Zevgolatio railway, which connected the Patras–Kyparissia and Corinth–Kalamata lines.
  - The 750 mm (2 ft 5 1/2 in) narrow-gauge rack railway line from Diakopto to Kalavryta (the Diakopto–Kalavryta Railway), which remains in operation as a local and tourist service.

=== Companies ===
Passenger and freight train services on SE lines are operated and provided mainly by Hellenic Train, (a former OSE subsidiary which is now owned by the Ferrovie dello Stato Italiane group). Moreover PEARL operate freight services between Piraeus port and the rest of Europe and Rail Cargo Logistics Goldair and GFR Hellas also operate freight services.

== Industrial railways ==
A number of railway lines were constructed mainly by mining operations and by extensive industrial facilities. There were also a few temporary lines, used for the construction of major public works. Most of them were either meter gauge or 600 mm (1 ft 11 5/8 in) narrow gauge.

== Military railways (1916–1918) ==
During World War I, after the collapse of Serbia, Eastern Macedonia was occupied by German and Bulgarian forces and Central and Western Macedonia by French and British troops, thus establishing the Macedonian front. The French and British troops and their Greek allies had extensive military logistics facilities in and around Thessaloniki. Supplies had to be transported to the various front line units. As World War I fronts were relatively static, it was possible to construct railway lines for this purpose. Almost all of these lines were of the Decauville system with a 600 mm (1 ft 11 5/8 in) narrow gauge. Some of these lines were completely isolated from existing lines while others started at mainline railway stations.

The most important such railways were the following:

- The Tasli–Stavros line at Orfanu Bay.
- The Perivolaki – Nea Zichni railway line. This 66 km long line, built by the British Army, was taken over by the Hellenic State Railways (SEK) in 1921. SEK operated this line until 1947. It was preserved on request of the Hellenic Army until 1952, when it was dismantled. The main rolling stock consisted of War Department Baldwin 4-6-0T steam locomotives.
- The Skydra (Vertekop)–Aridaia line. This 42 km long line was handed over after the war to Chemins de fer Vicinaux de Macedoine (1923), which failed to make a profit and the line was taken over by the Hellenic State Railways (SEK) in 1932. SEK closed the line in 1936.
- The Armenochori–Skotsidir line
- The Goumenissa line
- The Dimitritsi (Gudeli) to Kopriva (Kurfali) line
- The Katerini–Dramista line, a mining line for transport of brown coal (lignite)

Some of these railway lines continued operating for scheduled passenger and freight service after the conclusion of the war, under the company "Local Railways of Macedonia".

== Future ==
Schematic passenger railway map of Greece in 2022.

The Egnatia Railway is a planned railway line between Alexandroupolis and Igoumenitsa. The project includes track refurbishment and upgrades on the existing track sections of the Thessaloniki – Florina and Thessaloniki – Alexandroupolis railway lines, and brand new track between Florina and Krystallopigi, and Kozani to Igoumenitsa. The projected cost of this project is €10 billion.

The new double track, standard gauge railway between Athens and Patras is also currently under construction and expected to be completed by 2028.

Extensions of the Athens Suburban Railway to Eleusis and Megara, and to Loutraki, are currently underway, and further extensions to Lavrio and Rafina are also planned.

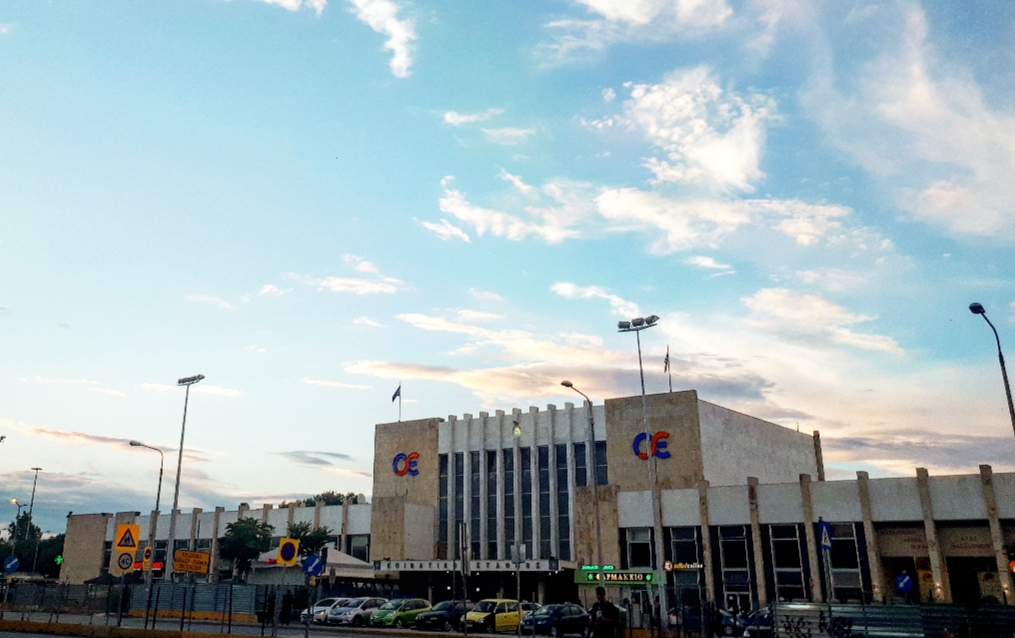
Thessaloniki railway station.

== Urban railways ==
=== Athens ===
Athens Metro consists of one mostly overground line (Line 1), one fully underground line (Line 2) and one mostly underground line (Line 3); it serves Athens' urban area. The system is owned by Elliniko Metro and is operated by STASY. Athens Metro trains reach Athens International Airport over electrified rail lines that are shared with the Suburban Railway.

The Athens Suburban Railway is a commuter rail system which consists of five lines running on the Athens–Thessaloniki railway (and its Oinoi–Chalcis branch) and the Athens Airport–Patras railway. It is double-tracked (except for the Oinoi–Chalcis section) and electrified throughout its network.

The modern day Athens Tram was built according to modern light rail standards in 2004. It has two lines, running from Piraeus to Voula along the Athens Riviera, and connecting it with Syntagma Square in the centre of Athens. It was built in standard gauge and extends a length of 32.4 km.

=== Thessaloniki ===
The Thessaloniki Metro opened on 30 November 2024, after a long period of construction that began in 2006: the system is owned by Elliniko Metro and operated by Thessaloniki Metro Automatic (THEMA). From New Railway Station (which connects with the main railway station), Line 1 runs to Nea Elvetia, while the future Line 2 will run to Mikra.

The Thessaloniki Regional Railway, formerly the Thessaloniki Suburban Railway, is a commuter rail service consisting of three lines and serving much of the region of Macedonia. From Τhessaloniki railway station, Line 1 runs to Katerini and Larissa, Line 2 runs to Edessa and Florina, and Line 3 runs to Serres and Drama. All three lines are standard gauge, but only Line 1 is electrified.

=== Patras ===
The Patras Suburban Railway is a commuter rail system which operates on two lines, both running from Agios Andreas railway station. Line P1 runs to the town of Kato Achaia and Line P2 to the suburb of Rio. The latter also offers bus connections, from the main railway station to the national network at Kiato, and to the University of Patras campus. It operates on the old metre gauge network and is thus unelectrified. It has basic passenger infrastructure and its stations more closely resemble halts.

=== Thrace ===
The Thrace Suburban Railway was a commuter rail system which operated during a short time from 2009 until 2010 on the standard gauge line from Alexandroupolis to Xanthi. On 3 February 2010, the service was suspended.

== See also ==
- Athens Metro
- Athens Tram
- P.A.Th.E./P.
- Budapest–Belgrade–Skopje–Athens railway
- Hellenic Railways Organisation
- List of town tramway systems in Greece
- Railway Museum of Athens
- Transport in Greece
