= SEK Class Theta-alpha =

Class of steam locomotives

SEK class Θα
Type and origin
- Power type: Steam
- Builder: Hanomag
- Build date: 1911
Specifications
- Configuration
  - Whyte: 2-8-0
  - UIC: 1′D n4v
- Gauge: 1,435 mm (4 ft 8 1/2 in)
- Wheelbase
  - Leading: 850 mm (2 ft 9 1/2 in)
  - Drivers: 1,250 mm (4 ft 1 1/4 in)
- Length: 17.368 m (56 ft 11 3/4 in)
- Width: 4.650 m (15 ft 3 1/16 in)
- Axle load: 14.1 tonnes (13.9 long tons; 15.5 short tons)
- Adhesive weight: 56.4 tonnes (55.5 long tons; 62.2 short tons)
- Loco weight: 68.7 tonnes (67.6 long tons; 75.7 short tons)
- Tender weight: 39.9 tonnes (39.3 long tons; 44.0 short tons)
- Total weight: 107.7 tonnes (106.0 long tons; 118.7 short tons)
- Fuel type: Coal
- Fuel capacity: 7 tonnes (6.9 long tons; 7.7 short tons)
- Water cap.: 7,000 litres (1,500 imp gal; 1,800 US gal)
- Firebox
  - Grate area: 3.96 m^{2} (42.6 sq ft)
- Boiler pressure: 15 kgf/cm^{2} (1.47 MPa; 213 psi)
- Heating surface: 171.44 m^{2} (1,845.4 sq ft)
- Cylinders: 4, compound
- High-pressure cylinder: 375 mm × 650 mm (14 3/4 in × 25 9/16 in)
- Low-pressure cylinder: 600 mm × 650 mm (23 5/8 in × 25 9/16 in)
Performance figures
- Maximum speed: 65 km/h (40 mph)
Career
- Operators: BDŽ → SEK → BDŽ
- Numbers: BDŽ 705 → SEK 601 → SEK 501 → BDŽ 27.17

SEK (Sidirodromoi Ellinikou Kratous, Hellenic State Railways) class Θα (or class THb; Theta-alpha) is a class of one 2-8-0 steam locomotives, acquired after the First World War.

Originally one of the Bulgarian State Railways' (BDŽ) 700 series four-cylinder compound locomotives that had been built by Hanomag in 1911 as BDŽ 705. It was given the class letters "Θα" by the SEK and initially numbered 601 before being renumbered 501.

During World War II it was reclaimed by the Bulgarians and renumbered BDŽ 27.17 at the end of the surviving 700s (which by then had become BDŽ class 27).
