= Hellenic State Railways =

State railway operator in Greece (1920–1970)

Hellenic State Railways or SEK (Greek: Σιδηρόδρομοι Ελληνικού Κράτους)
- Chemins de fer de l'État Hellénique

Overview
- Headquarters: 1–3 Karolou St., 104 37, Athens
- Locale: Greece
- Dates of operation: 18 March 1920; 106 years ago–31 December 1970; 55 years ago
- Successor: Hellenic Railways Organisation

Technical
- Track gauge: 1,435 mm (4 ft 8 1/2 in); 750 mm (2 ft 5 1/2 in)
- Previous gauge: 1,000 mm (3 ft 3 3/8 in); 600 mm (1 ft 11 5/8 in)
- Length: 1,816 km (1,128 mi)

Hellenic State Railways or SEK (Greek: Σιδηρόδρομοι Ελληνικού Κράτους, Sidirodromi Ellinikou Kratous; Σ.Ε.Κ.) was a Greek public sector entity (legal person of public law, Greek: Ν.Π.Δ.Δ.) which was established on 18 March 1920 by the law 2144/20 and operated most Greek railway lines until 1970.

== History ==
The Hellenic State Railways took over the standard gauge railway line from Piraeus to Papapouli at the pre-1912 borders, the extension from Papapouli to Platy and most of the former Ottoman railway lines that were within the Greek borders after 1919. These lines were:

- Piraeus, Demerli & Frontiers Railway (Greek: Σιδηρόδρομος Πειραιώς-Δεμερλή-Συνόρων), also known as Larisaikos
- Part of the former Thessaloniki & Monastir Railway (French: Chemin de fer de Salonique à Monastir or SM)
- Part of Chemins de fer Orientaux or CO, between Thessaloniki and Idomeni. The line from Alexandroupolis to Ormenio was transferred to the French-Hellenic Railway Company (Chemin de fer Franco-Hellenique, CFFH) of Evros (Greek: Γαλλοελληνική Εταιρεία Σιδηροδρόμων or ΓΕΣ) which was absorbed by SEK much later, in 1954
- The Thessaloniki-Constantinople Link Railway (French: Jonction Salonique-Constantinople or JSC) operating the Thessaloniki–Alexandroupolis railway.

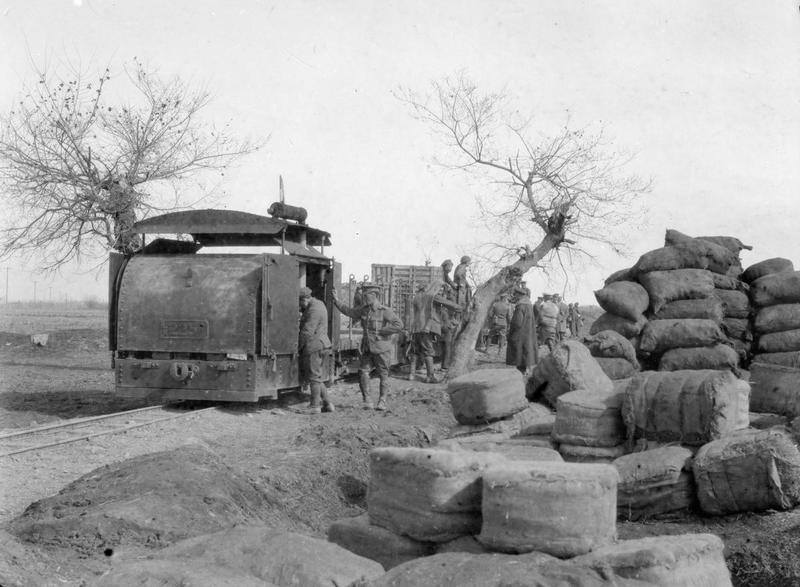
Simplex petrol locomotive on the military 600 mm (1 ft 11 5/8 in) gauge line Sarakli-Stavros during World War 1

- The 66 km long Sarakli-Stavros line, a former military line (600 mm (1 ft 11 5/8 in) gauge) constructed during World War I (see also: Perivolaki – Nea Zichni railway line).
- The 50 km long Skydra local railway, a former military line (600 mm gauge) constructed during World War I and initially operated until 1936 by a company called Local Railways of Macedonia (Greek: Τοπικοί Σιδηρόδρομοι Μακεδονίας).

After World War II the Hellenic State Railways absorbed most other Greek railways, including:

- Piraeus, Athens and Peloponnese Railways (1962), which had already absorbed other minor metre gauge railways.
- Thessaly Railways (1955), including Pelion railway.
- The French-Hellenic Railway Company (Chemin de fer Franco-Hellenique) of Evros (1954).

Only Ellinikoi Ilektrikoi Sidirodromoi (E.I.S., later Athens-Piraeus Electric Railways), operator of Piraeus-Kifissia railway and Piraeus-Perama light railway, and the private mining and industrial lines remained independent.

The Hellenic State Railways existed until December 31, 1970. On the next day all railways in Greece with the exception of private industrial lines and E.I.S. were transferred to Hellenic Railways Organisation S.A., a state-owned corporation.

== Network and other infrastructure ==
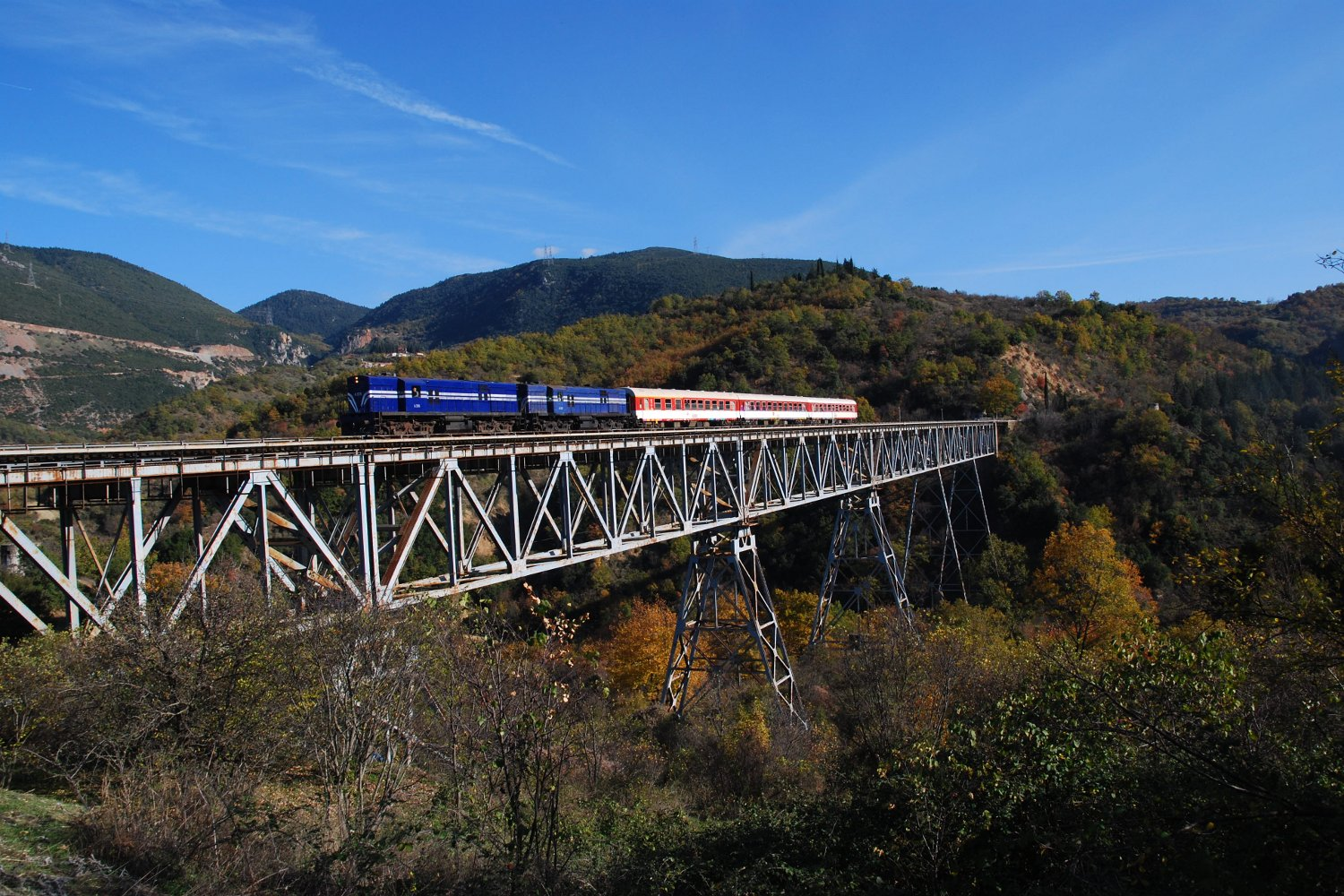
Brallos (or Papadia) bridge, rebuilt in 1945.

During this period very little expansion of the existing network took place, the most notable being:

- The Amyntaio-Kozani branch (1955).
- The 15 km long line from Strymonas to Kulata (1966), connecting the Greek and Bulgarian railway networks.
- Another 25 km long branch line from Nea Zichni (Mirini) to Amphipolis (1931), which was later abandoned and the track was lifted in 1970.
- Conversion of the line between Athens and Inoi to double track.

A contract was signed in 1928 for a new line connecting Kalampaka to Kozani, but the project was abandoned in 1932 due to lack of funds.

The Greek railway system (both infrastructure and rolling stock) suffered serious damages during World War II (especially in 1943–1944) and did not become fully operational until 1950. However the viaduct of Achladokampos in Peloponnese, destroyed in 1944, was rebuilt only in 1974.

In 1960 the line from Larissa to Volos, of the former Thessaly Railways, was converted to standard gauge and was connected in Larissa with the line from Athens to Thessaloniki.

New station buildings were constructed in Thessaloniki (known as Thessaloniki New Passenger Station or ΝΕΣΘ) (1952), Larissa (1962), Lianokladi (1950), Sindos, Aiginio, Platamon, Florina, Edessa, Agras, Arnissa, Polykastron, Ptolemais and Kozani.

== Rolling stock ==
Until 1962 the Hellenic State Railways used a variety of steam locomotives from various sources. Some of them belonged to the pre-1920 networks, a number were acquired as part of foreign aid programs after the war and a small number was procured.

Conversion to diesel traction began in the early 1960s. The first diesel locomotives were delivered in 1962 and included 30 Krupp Y60 shunters (Class A-101), 10 ALCo DL532B (Class A-201) and 10 ALCo DL500C (Class A-301). They were followed by classes A-221, A-321, A-351, A-401 and A-411 for the 1,435 mm (4 ft 8 1/2 in) standard gauge network and classes A-9101, A-9201 and A-9401 for the 1,000 mm (3 ft 3 3/8 in) metre gauge networks.

Diesel multiple units were first introduced in 1936 and became more common in the 1950s and 1960s. Steam locomotives were slowly phased out but were still in limited use in December 1970.

=== Steam locomotives ===
The following table shows steam locomotives acquired by the Hellenic State Railways between 1920 and 1969. They also continued to use an assortment of older types of locomotives inherited from the previous Greek and Ottoman railway companies.

Photo	Class	Numbers	Type	Quantity	Manufacturer	Serial Nos.	Year	Power	Notes
	Αα	1–5	0-4-0T	5					Ex CO 403–408
	Βα	11–17	2-4-0T	7					Ex CO 321–328 series
	Γα	21–22	4-4-0T	2	Neilson & Co.		1892		Ex SEK 301–302, originally SAP
	Γβ	31–35	4-4-0	5	StEG				Ex CO
	Δα (1st)	51	0-6-0ST	1	Manning Wardle		1892		Ex SAP
	Δα (2nd)	51–70	0-6-0T	20	Davenport Locomotive Works, Vulcan Iron Works, H.K. Porter		1945–1946	730 hp (544 kW)	USATC S100; several rebuilt as 0-6-0 8 preserved Δα 53,57,59,60,61 are in Thessaloniki Δα 55 and Δα 63 at the Thessaloniki Railway Museum Δα 65 is located at Tithorea
	Δβ	61-70	0-6-0	10					Ex Railway Operating Division
	Δγ	71-75	0-6-0	5					Ex JSC 50–54
	Δγ	76	4-4-0	1	StEG		1888		Ex CFFH 102, previously CO
	Δδ	81–87	0-6-0	7					Ex CO 4–10
	Δε	88–103	0-6-0	15					Ex CO 11–54 series
	Δζ	111–114	0-6-0	4					Ex CO 502–506
	Εα	201–223	2-6-0T	23	Batignolles (13); St. Léonard (10)		1903–1907		Ex SEK 101–123
	Εβ	231–232	2-6-0	2					Ex CO 509–510
	Εγ	241–243	2-6-0	3					Ex CO 521–523
	Ζα	301–307	4-6-0	7	Batignolles		1906		Ex SEK 201–207; four-cylinder de Glenn compounds, based on Midi 1400 class 1 preserved Ζα 306 at the Thessaloniki Railway Museum
	Ζβ	311	4-6-0	1					Ex SEK 221
	Ζγ	321–330	4-6-0	10					Ex JSC 101–110
	Ζδ	341–350	4-6-0	10					Ex Prussian P 8
	Ζε	331–333	2-6-2	3					Ex CFFH
	Ηα	401	0-8-0	1					Ex JSC, originally Prussian G 7
	Ηβ	411–423	0-8-0	13					Ex JSC 1–16
	Ηγ	431–432	0-8-0	2					Ex SBB 4105, 4112
	Ηδ	441–443	0-8-0	3					Ex SBB 4130, 4134, 4135
	Ηε	444–446	2-8-0	3	Batignolles		1924	903 hp (673 kW)	Ex CFFH, previously CO 260–262
	Θα	501	2-8-0	1					ex SEK 601
	Θβ	511–512	2-8-0	2					Ex SEK 621–622
	Θγ	521–537; 551–560; 571–595	2-8-0	27+25	Baldwin Locomotive Works, American Locomotive Works, Lima Locomotive Works		1947	1,200 hp (895 kW)	USATC S160 521–537 coal-fired, 551–560 oil-fired, 571–595 from Italy in 1959 (FS Class 736) 7 preserved Θγ 525,532,535,584 at the Old Railway Station in Thessaloniki Θγ 593 at the current Thessaloniki depot Θγ 576 at Tithorea Θγ 575 at the Churnet Valley Railway in Great Britain
	Ια	701–720	2-8-2	20	American Locomotive Company		1915		ex SEK 401–420
	Κα	801–802	0-10-0	2	Hanomag		1912		ex SEK 521–522
	Κβ	811–860	0-10-0	60	StEG		1922–1926	895 kW (1,200 hp)	kkStB / BBÖ class 80.900 (ÖBB class 57) 1 preserved Κβ 817 at the current Thessaloniki depot
	Κβ	809-810	0-10-0	2				895 kW (1,200 hp)	kkStB / BBÖ class 80.900 (ÖBB class 57); Ex CFFH
	Κγ	861–880	0-10-0	20	Ateliers de Tubize, Haine St Pierre, St. Léonard; La Meuse		1929	895 kW (1,200 hp)	1 preserved Κγ 877 at Drama
	Κδ	881–893	0-10-0	12	Henschel				Ex Deutsche Reichsbahn 57.10-35 (Prussian G 10), used by the German occupation forces and left behind when they retreated in 1944
	Λα	901–940	2-10-0	40	StEG (10), Škoda Works (30)		1925–1927	1,156 kW (1,550 hp)	Südbahn class 580 2 preserved Λα 902( incorecclty having the number 905) at the current Thessaloniki depot Λα 908 was in a very severe state at Tithorea until 1984-85 when it was probably scrapped along with some class Λβ locomotives.
	Λβ	951–966	2-10-0	16	North British Locomotive Company		1946	1,141 kW (1,530 hp)	WD Austerity 2-10-0 6 preserved Λβ 951 is located at the North Norfolk Railway in Great Britain Λβ 955 at the Old Railway Station in Thessaloniki Λβ 958 at Tithorea Λβ 960 is located at the North Yorkshire Moors Railway in Great Britain Λβ 962 at Drama Λβ 964 at Thessaloniki
	Λγ	991–998	2-10-0	8	Baldwin Locomotive Works		1947	1,270 kW (1,703 hp)	3 preserved Λγ 994,995,996 at Tithorea
	Μα	1001–1020	2-10-2	20	Ansaldo (10); Breda (10)		1953–1954	2,180 kW (2,920 hp)	2 preserved Μα 1002 is located at the Rouf Station in Athens as a static exhibit Μα 1013 at the Old Railway Station in Thessaloniki

=== Diesel locomotives (standard gauge) ===
Photo	Class	Numbers	Type	Quantity	Manufacturer	Year	Model	Power	Notes
	A-101		0-6-0 dh	30	Krupp	1962–1967	Y60	478 kW (641 hp)	
	A-201		Bo-Bo de	10	ALCo	1962	DL532B	772 kW (1,035 hp)	
	A-301		Co-Co de	10	ALCo	1962	DL500C	1,470 kW (1,971 hp)	
	A-321		Co-Co de	7	ALCo	1967	DL543	1,470 kW (1,971 hp)	
	A-351		Co-Co de	26	Alsthom	1967	CC AD 2100C1	1,544 kW (2,071 hp)	
	A-401		Co-Co de	10	Siemens-Jung	1966		1,470 kW (1,971 hp)	
	A-411		B-B dh	20	Krauss-Maffei	1963	V200	1,618 kW (2,170 hp)	

=== Diesel locomotives (metre gauge) ===
Photo	Class	Numbers	Type	Quantity	Manufacturer	Year	Model	Power	Notes
	A-9101		Co-Co de	12	ALCo	1965	DL537	993 kW (1,332 hp)	
	A-9201		Co-Co de	10	Alsthom	1967	CC AD 1600A1	1,175 kW (1,576 hp)	
	A-9401		B-B dh	20	Mitsubishi	1967	48-BB-HI	478 kW (641 hp)	

=== Diesel multiple units ===
The Hellenic State Railways bought their first DMUs in 1936 and acquired larger numbers in the 1950s. Additional metre gauge multiple units were inherited from networks absorbed in SEK.

Photo	Class	Numbers	Type	Quantity	Manufacturer	Year	Model	Power	Notes
	(AA11)		2-Bo de	2	Floridsdorf	1936			
	AA11-AA26; A111-A118		A1-1A+2-2	16	Fiat	1950			
	AA27-AA36; A119-A128		A1-1A+2-2	10	Fiat	1958			
	AA41		2-B	9	Renault	1950			
	AA61		B-B	3	MAN	1955			
	AA71		2-B	20	Ferrostaal-Esslingen	1962			

== See also ==
- Railways of Greece
- Hellenic Railways Organisation

== References and notes ==
- Durrant, A. E. (1972) [1966]. The Steam Locomotives of Eastern Europe. Newton Abbot, Devon, UK: David and Charles. pp. 50–60. ISBN 0-7153-4077-8.
- Smith, J. D. H. (2005–2007). "HSR steam locomotives".
- Zartaloudis, I.; Karatolos, D.; Koutelidis, D.; Nathenas, G.; Fasoulas, S.; Filippoupolitis, A. (1997). Οι Ελληνικοί Σιδηρόδρομοι (Hellenic Railways) (in Greek). Μίλητος (Militos). ISBN 960-8460-07-7. It is the only extensive and authoritative source for the history of Greek railways.
