= OSE class A.101 =

Class of Greek diesel-hydraulic locomotives

OSE A.101
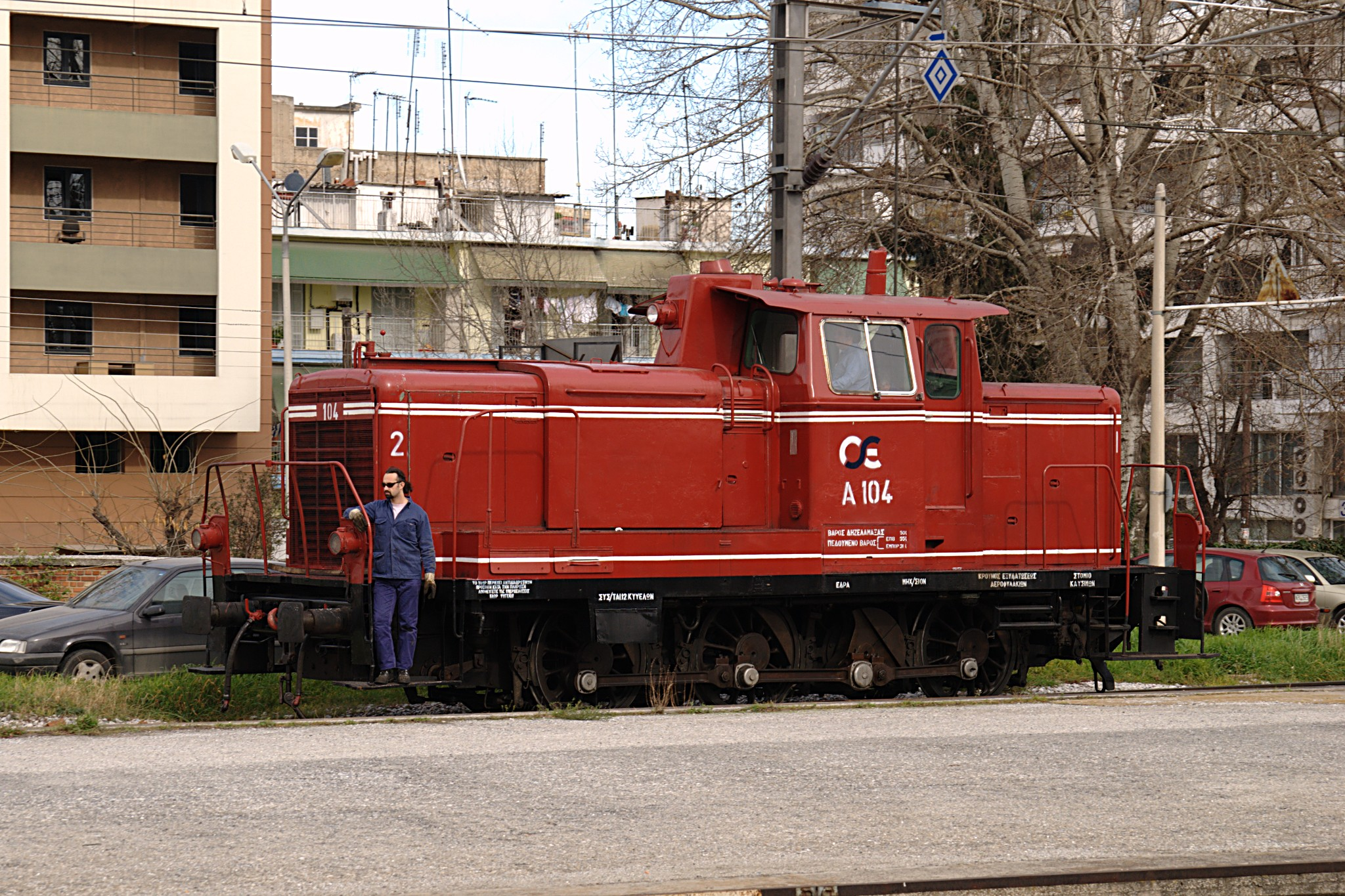
- Α.104 in Thessaloniki
Type and origin
- Build date: 1962-1968
Specifications
- Configuration
  - AAR: C
- Gauge: Standard
- Wheel diameter: 1,2 m.:
- Power supply: Hydraulic diesel oil
- Transmission: Hydraulic
Performance figures
- Maximum speed: 70 km/h
- Power output: 478 kW
Career
- Operators: TrainOSE
- Numbers: Α.101-Α.130

The OSE class A.101 (Krupp V60), also known as Κruppάκι-Κruppάκια (Kroupaki, "Little Krupp"), due to its small size, only 10 meters long, is, along with the class A.201, the oldest series of locomotive operated by TRAINOSE and is part fleet of the OSE. It is a diesel-powered, built in 1962 by Krupp for SEK and was put into operation at OSE in 1971, with its foundation. It has a MTW GTO 6 diesel engine with combined power of 478 kW and reaching speeds of up to 70 km / h in freight and local trains, and 30 in shunting operations.

Class A.101 locomotives are based in the Rentis depot, where they are preserved. They had three axles that were coupled with rods, with 950 hop, made from a fully welded frame and weighing 51 tons. The driver's cab was soundproofed with good visibility for operation to either direction. It was one of the most successful choices of the Greek Railways.

== Route ==
Today only 2 such locomotives are available for shunting in Northern Greece, and specifically in Thessaloniki. The A116 works and more rarely the A110 only for wagon maneuvers.

== List of locomotives ==
The following table summarizes the class

DH Krupp V60 locomotives
ΟΣΕ A-101	C	dh	Krupp 4464	1962
ΟΣΕ Α-102-4	C	dh	Krupp 4465	1962
ΟΣΕ Α-103-2	C	dh	Krupp 4466	1962
ΟΣΕ Α-104-0	C	dh	Krupp 4467	1962
ΟΣΕ Α-105-7	C	dh	Krupp 4468	1962
ΟΣΕ Α-106-5	C	dh	Krupp 4469	1962
ΟΣΕ Α-107-3	C	dh	Krupp 4470	1962
ΟΣΕ A-108	C	dh	Krupp 4811	1965
ΟΣΕ A-109	C	dh	Krupp 4812	1965
ΟΣΕ A-110	C	dh	Krupp 4813	1965
ΟΣΕ A-111	C	dh	Krupp 4814	1965
ΟΣΕ A-112	C	dh	Krupp 4815	1965
ΟΣΕ A-113	C	dh	Krupp 4816	1965
ΟΣΕ A-114	C	dh	Krupp 4817	1965
ΟΣΕ A-115	C	dh	Krupp 4818	1965
ΟΣΕ A-116	C	dh	Krupp 4819	1965
ΟΣΕ A-117	C	dh	Krupp 4820	1965
ΟΣΕ A-118	C	dh	Krupp 4821	1965
ΟΣΕ A-119	C	dh	Krupp 4864	1967
ΟΣΕ A-120	C	dh	Krupp 4865	1967
ΟΣΕ A-121	C	dh	Krupp 4866	1967
ΟΣΕ A-122	C	dh	Krupp 4867	1967
ΟΣΕ A-123	C	dh	Krupp 4868	1967
ΟΣΕ A-124	C	dh	Krupp 4869	1967
ΟΣΕ A-125	C	dh	Krupp 4870	1967
ΟΣΕ A-126	C	dh	Krupp 4871	1967
ΟΣΕ A-127	C	dh	Krupp 4872	1967
ΟΣΕ A-128	C	dh	Krupp 4873	1967
ΟΣΕ A-129	C	dh	Krupp 4874	1967
ΟΣΕ A-130	C	dh	Krupp 4875	1967

== History ==
As early as 1951, the Deutsche Bundesbahn (DB) had designed for shunting purposes a type of diesel-hydraulic locomotive, named V60, which was later numbered 260, 261 and 362, which numbered 962 machines, manufactured by nearly all German industries: Krupp, Henschel, Esslingen, Krauss-Maffei, etc. As early as 1955, they were delivered in Norway, Yugoslavia (later Croatia), Belgium, Turkey and Israel. In Greece, SEK purchased between the years 1962-1968 30 such locomotives, numbered A101 - A130.

== Livery ==
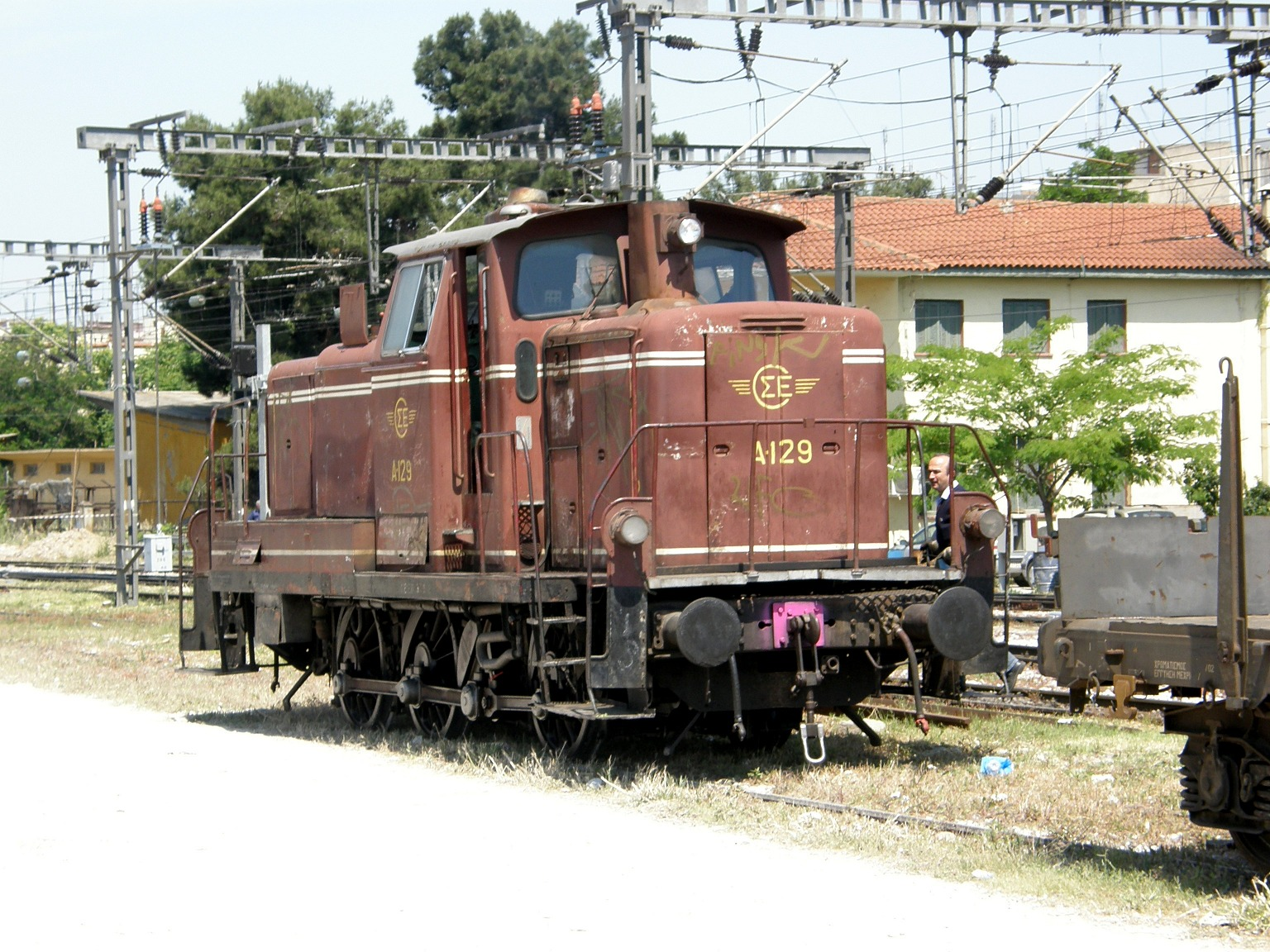
A.101 class locomotives used to have yellow text in their old livery. Here, A.129 at Thessaloniki in 2008

The livery consist of a white vertical stripe on a brown color covering the largest surface of the vehicles.
