= SEK class Kappa-gamma =

Steam locomotive

SEK Class Κγ
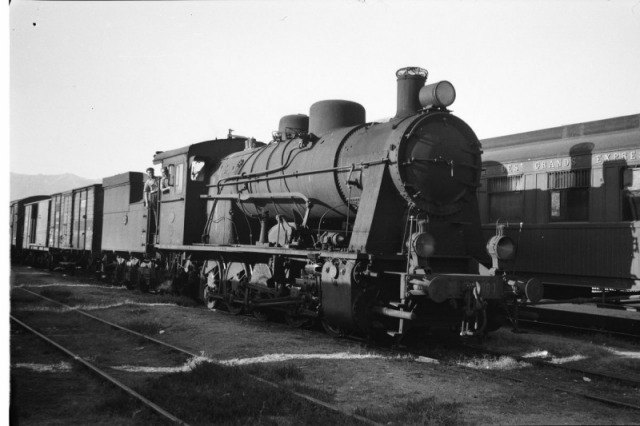
- SEK Kg 880 freight train in Komotini station, September 1954
Type and origin
- Power type: Steam
- Builder: Ateliers de Tubize (10); Forges Usines et Fonderies Haine-Saint-Pierre (5); Société de Saint-Léonard (5); La Meuse ()
- Build date: 1929
- Total produced: 20
Specifications
- Configuration
  - Whyte: 0-10-0
  - UIC: E h2
- Gauge: 1,435 mm (4 ft 8 1/2 in)
- Driver dia.: 1,300 mm (4 ft 3 1/8 in)
- Length: 18.030 m (59 ft 1 7/8 in)
- Loco weight: 70 tonnes (69 long tons; 77 short tons)
- Fuel type: Coal
- Firebox
  - Grate area: 3.2 m^{2} (34 sq ft)
- Boiler pressure: 14 kg/cm^{2} (200 psi)
- Heating surface: 150 m^{2} (1,600 sq ft)
- Superheater
  - Heating area: 45 m^{2} (480 sq ft)
- Cylinders: Two
- Cylinder size: 575 mm × 660 mm (22 5/8 in × 26 in)
Career
- Operators: SEK
- Numbers: 861–880

SEK (Sidirodromoi Ellinikou Kratous, Hellenic State Railways) Class Κγ (or Class Kg; Kappa-gamma) is a class of 20 0-10-0 steam locomotives purchased from four Belgian locomotive manufacturers in 1929.

They were given the class letters "Kg" and numbers 861 to 880.
