= SEK class Λγ =

SEK Class Λγ
Type and origin
- Power type: Steam
- Builder: Baldwin Locomotive Works
- Build date: 1947
- Total produced: 8
Specifications
- Configuration
  - Whyte: 2-10-0
  - UIC: 1′E h2
- Gauge: 1,435 mm (4 ft 8 1/2 in)
- Driver dia.: 1,450 mm (4 ft 9 1/8 in)
- Length
  - Over beams: 21.287 m (69.84 ft)
- Adhesive weight: 74.0 tonnes (72.8 long tons; 81.6 short tons)
- Loco weight: 85.0 tonnes (83.7 long tons; 93.7 short tons)
- Fuel type: Coal
- Firebox
  - Grate area: 4.61 m^{2} (49.6 sq ft)
- Boiler pressure: 15 kg/cm^{2} (1.47 MPa; 213 psi)
- Heating surface: 175.5 m^{2} (1,889 sq ft)
- Superheater
  - Heating area: 56.0 m^{2} (603 sq ft)
- Cylinders: Two, outside
- Cylinder size: 533 mm × 711 mm (21 in × 28 in)
Career
- Operators: SEK
- Number in class: 991–998

SEK (Sidirodromoi Ellinikou Kratous, Hellenic State Railways) Class Λγ (or Class Lg; Lambda-gamma) is a class of eight 2-10-0 steam locomotives purchased in 1947 from Baldwin Locomotive Works.

They were given the class letters "Λγ" and numbered 991 to 998.
