= OSE class A.451 =

OSE A.450
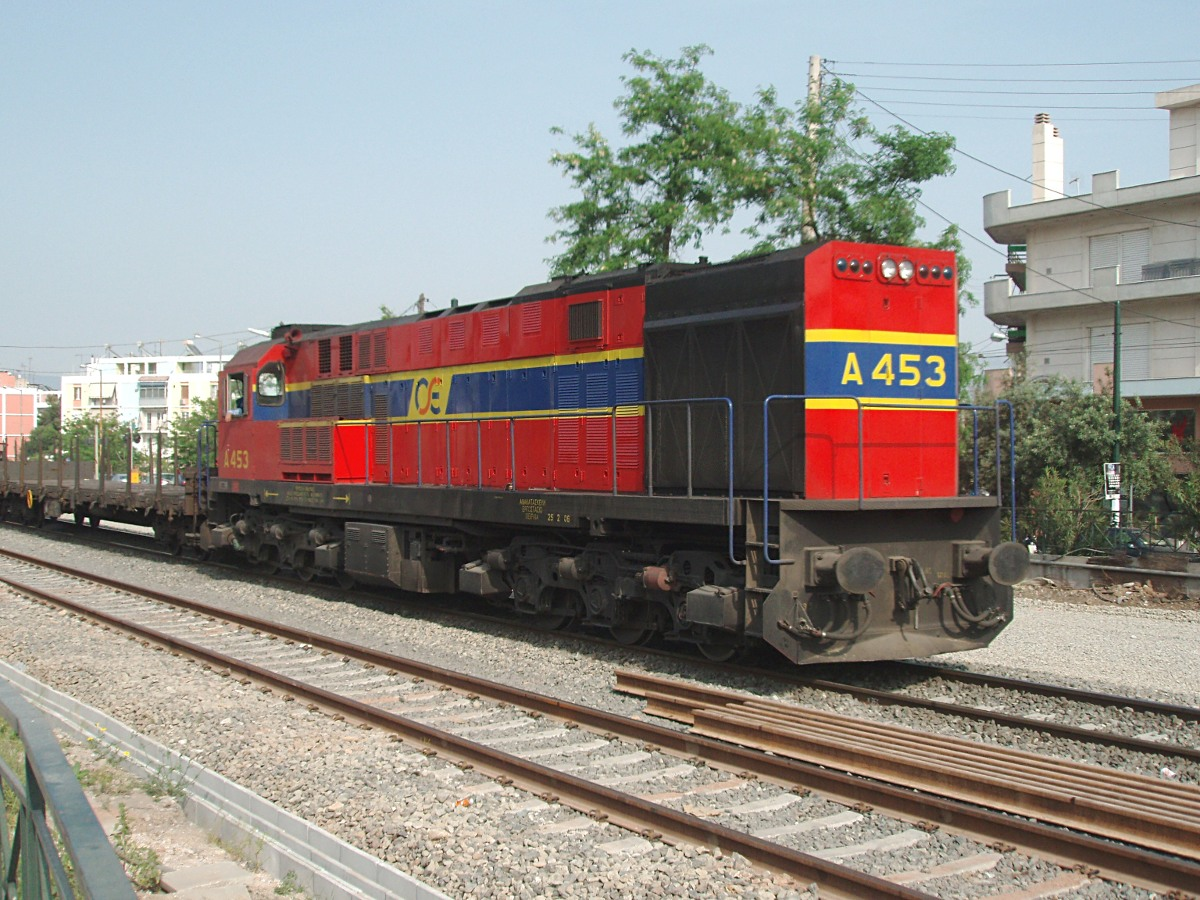
- The A.453 in 2007
Type and origin
- Build date: 1973
Specifications
- Configuration
  - AAR: C-C
  - UIC: Co′Co′
- Gauge: 4 ft 8 1/2 in (1,435 mm)
- Wheel diameter: 1 m
- Wheelbase: 13.1 m
- Power supply: Diesel oil
- Transmission: Electric
Performance figures
- Maximum speed: 120/150 km/h
- Power output: 1,990 kW (2,670 hp)
- Tractive effort: 290 kN
Career
- Operators: TrainOSE

OSE class A-450, also known as 450άρα (450ara, "Big 450") or Καναδέζα (Kanadeza, "Canadian") is a series of diesel-electric locomotives used by TrainOSE. They were built and put into operation by OSE in 1973. Construction was made by Montreal Locomotive Works in Canada. Outwardly they look like the class A.501, with the basic difference that they are of lesser strength and have different appearance, before rebuilding, as in the elevated head-ons they housed the steam heating boiler. This allowed them to be used in passenger routes during the winter.

However, they have the same, manufacturers and power supply while being in the standard gauge. They run unilaterally, and have the ability to run coupled with another locomotive up to 2 units (Sometimes it can also be an A.501 class locomotive). In total, 20 such locomotives were received. They feature a 12-cylinder ALCO 251 engine that delivers 2,700 hp (2,000 kW) at 1100 rpm with supercharger and combined power of 1,985 kW (2,662 hp). From the manufacturing factory they developed a maximum speed of 149 km / h and today they reach speeds of up to 120/150 kilometers per hour.

== Route ==
A.451 class locomotives serve large freight trains.

== History ==
=== 1970-1990 ===
With the establishment of OSE in 1971, there are deficiencies in rolling stock. The era of steam is over and the available locomotives are not enough. The trainsets of Greek State Railways A-200 A.300, A.320, A.400 and A.350 introduced from 1961 to 1967 placed on the standard line and number about 63 units, but all had little effect compared with the foreseeable needs. Vehicles are being modernized and trains are growing and weighing. On the other hand, many of the old units have been destroyed in accidents, while others have been damaged due to lack of spare parts. So the supply of newer stronger engines becomes even more imperative. For the supply of 20 new units, the American brand was again selected, this time, its Canadian branch, Montreal Locomotive Works. Although an American title, the abbreviation is pronounced in the German "Em-El-Ve" (MLW). MLW's work continued with the delivery of ALCo design products in all directions of the world. At the same time they gave Europe a large version of M-liners exports in 1974. The first 20 trucks were the MX-627, with axle arrangement Co′Co′.

Since 1973, the locomotives have been engaged in the hauling of heavy commercial and passenger trains across the normal-range network between Athens and Thessaloniki and between Thessaloniki and Alexandroupolis and Thessaloniki-Larissa, where they remained until 1998. The series then replaced the work of A.321 class on the Kozani line until the diesel trainsets have taken over the traffic there. Among these are the major international routes "Hellas Express". Some of the innovations that they introduce, the power of power for the heavy lifts, the electric drive combination that allowed good acceleration for the passenger trains and the dynamic brake that first appeared on a Greek train, the ergonomic controls and the excellent suspension. However, in the early years of the 1080's, the locomotives will have problems in their reliability, mainly due to material failure in cylinder heads and superchargers. The then management will decide to reduce the power by 12% (2400 hp). In 1974, OSE ordered 10 similar MX-636 locomotives from MLW, larger in size, weight and power, 3599 horsepower. They were released in 1975 and they got the numbering A.501 to A.510.

These units will serve for several years until ADTranz locomotives will replace both the oldest units and the same in passenger trains in the overwhelming majority. Their good specifications, ideal for freight trains, will lead the company's management to decide to keep these units in service for this purpose. Following the fate of their predecessors, they settle in the Depot of Thessaloniki, where they continue to serve until today. It is worth noting that even after ADtranz arrived these locomotives were used occasionally on local trains, and many times, especially after their reconstruction, took over the traction of the 444-445 "Dostluk Ekspresi" (Thessaloniki Express) from Thessaloniki-Istanbul. Since 1980 it has remained the most reliable traction machine with the lowest degree of immobility. In March 99 the MLW is referred to as the normal force in "Hellas Express" from Thessaloniki to Edomeni.In April 1999, one MLW served each one as the well known "Thunderbirds" in Lianokladi (A- 467) and Larissa (A-470).

=== 2000s-today ===
The first attempt to reconstruct the units was in 2001. The reconstruction involved the removal of the steam generator and the configuration of the head-ons in the standards of the A-500 class locomotives and some other modifications and improvements. The first 2 units being rebuilt at Piraeus are A-461 and A-468. After the return of the A-504 from the NREC facilities in Illinois, the then management of OSE decides to reconstruct them all in the style of the aforementioned locomotives. The steam engines were removed from the engines and, due to the installation of the new diesel engine surveillance software, the engine compartment was positioned 1 meter farther ahead. Modern ergonomic controls and cabin air conditioning were installed in the N / H. Today, the last 2 units are at the Piraeus Factory and are awaiting completion of the works.

== Livery ==
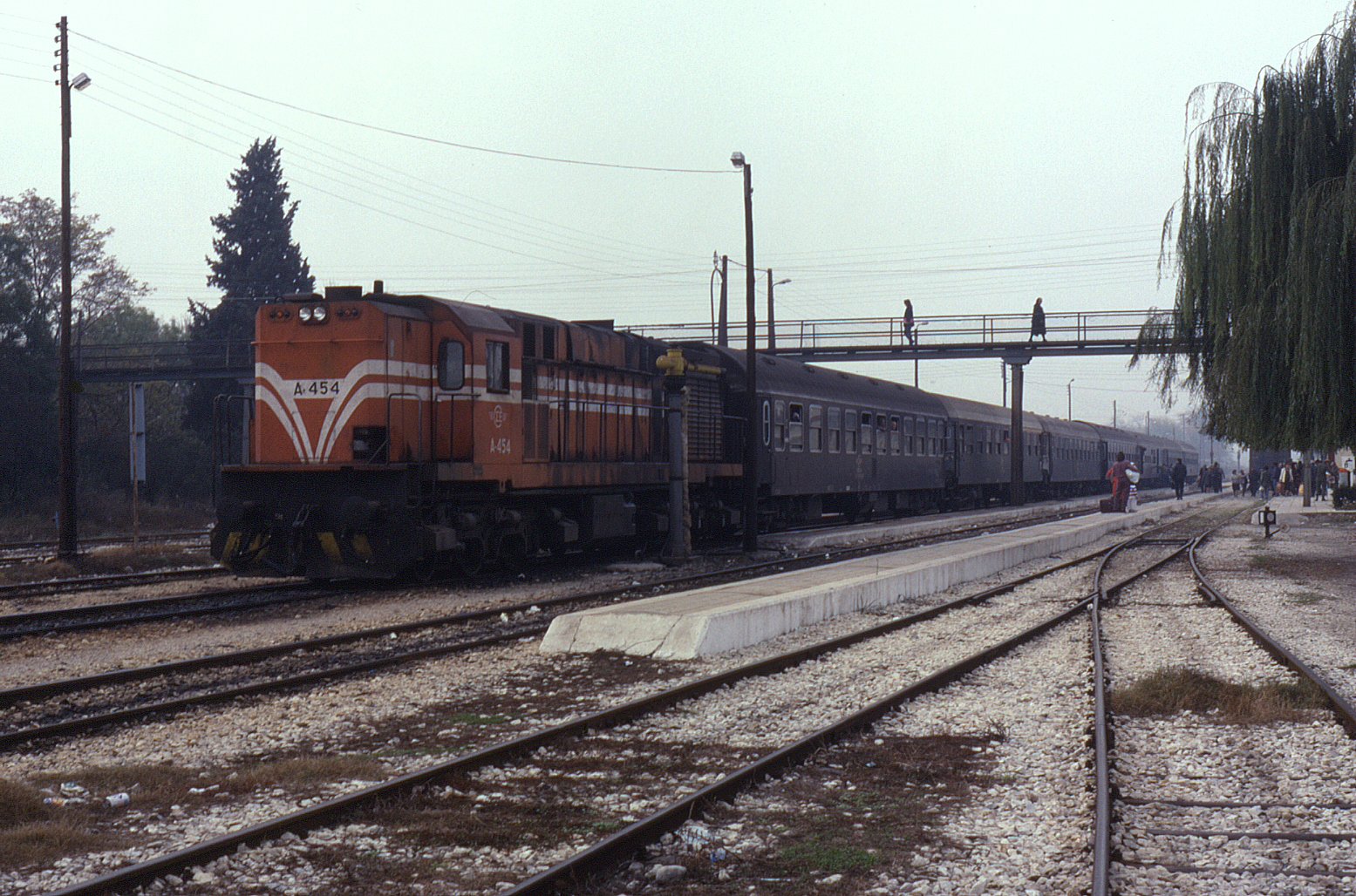
The A.451 class locomotives they were retrofitted had an elevated front panel due to the heating boiler and had a different color. Here A.454 with the train 604 in Drama in 1992

The livery of the locomotives consists of a blue horizontal stripe with a yellow border that ends in an orange-red arrow, covering the largest surface of the vehicles. Before the modifications, the units were orange with white horizontal stripes that joined to the masks creating a triangle.
