= SEK Class Theta-beta =

Class of steam locomotive

SEK class Θβ
Type and origin
- Power type: Steam
- Builder: Henschel & Sohn
- Build date: 1912
Specifications
- Configuration
  - Whyte: 2-8-0
  - UIC: 1′D n4v
- Gauge: 1,435 mm (4 ft 8 1/2 in)
- Leading dia.: 850 mm (2 ft 9 1/2 in)
- Driver dia.: 1,450 mm (4 ft 9 1/8 in)
- Length: 17,905 mm (58 ft 9 in)
- Height: 4,650 mm (15 ft 3 1/16 in)
- Axle load: 14.15 tonnes (13.93 long tons; 15.60 short tons)
- Adhesive weight: 56.60 tonnes (55.71 long tons; 62.39 short tons)
- Loco weight: 69.97 tonnes (68.86 long tons; 77.13 short tons)
- Total weight: 115.17 tonnes (113.35 long tons; 126.95 short tons)
- Fuel type: Coal
- Fuel capacity: 8 tonnes (7.9 long tons; 8.8 short tons)
- Water cap.: 18,600 litres (4,100 imp gal; 4,900 US gal)
- Firebox
  - Grate area: 3.96 m^{2} (42.6 sq ft)
- Boiler pressure: 15 kg/cm^{2} (1.47 MPa; 213 psi)
- Heating surface
  - Tubes: 213.0 m^{2} (2,293 sq ft)
  - Total surface: 226.7 m^{2} (2,440 sq ft)
- Cylinders: Four, compound
- High-pressure cylinder: 400 mm × 650 mm (15 3/4 in × 25 9/16 in)
- Low-pressure cylinder: 640 mm × 650 mm (25 3/16 in × 25 9/16 in)
Performance figures
- Maximum speed: 80 km/h (50 mph)
Career
- Operators: BDŽ → SEK → BŽD
- Numbers: BDŽ 806/811 → SEK 621/622 → SEK 521/522 → BŽD 17.72/17.73

SEK (Sidirodromoi Ellinikou Kratous, Hellenic State Railways) Class Θβ (or Class THb; Theta-beta) is a class of two 2-8-0 steam locomotives acquired after the First World War.

Originally one of the Bulgarian State Railways' (BDŽ) 800 series four-cylinder compound locomotives that had been built by Henschel & Sohn in 1912 as BDŽ 806 and 811. They were given the class letters "Θβ" by the SEK and initially numbered 621 and 622 before being renumbered 521 and 522.

During World War II, they were reclaimed by the Bulgarians and renumbered BDŽ 17.72 and 17.73 at the end of the surviving 800s (which by then had become BDŽ class 17).
