= SEK class Λα =

Class of 1920s steam locomotives

SEK Class Λα
Type and origin
- Power type: Steam
- Builder: Lokomotivfabrik der StEG (10); Škoda Works (30)
- Build date: 1926 (10), 1927 (30)
- Total produced: 40
Specifications
- Configuration
  - Whyte: 2-10-0
  - UIC: 1′E h2
- Gauge: 1,435 mm (4 ft 8 1/2 in)
- Driver dia.: 1,450 mm (4 ft 9 1/8 in)
- Length
  - Over beams: 19.716 m (64.69 ft)
- Adhesive weight: 72.2 tonnes (71.1 long tons; 79.6 short tons)
- Loco weight: 85.4 tonnes (84.1 long tons; 94.1 short tons)
- Firebox
  - Grate area: 4.47 m^{2} (48.1 sq ft)
- Boiler pressure: 14 kg/cm^{2} (1.37 MPa; 199 psi)
- Heating surface: 211.0 m^{2} (2,271 sq ft)
- Superheater: 58.3 m^{2} (628 sq ft)
- Cylinders: Two, outside
- Cylinder size: 610 mm × 720 mm (24 in × 28 3/8 in)
Career
- Operators: SEK
- Numbers: 901–940

SEK (Sidirodromoi Ellinikou Kratous, Hellenic State Railways) Class Λα (or Class La; Lambda-alpha) is a class of forty 2-10-0 steam locomotives purchased in 1926 and 1927 from Lokomotivfabrik der StEG and Škoda Works

They were given the class letters "Λα" and numbers 901 to 940.
