= OSE class A.201 =

Class of Greek diesel-electric locomotive

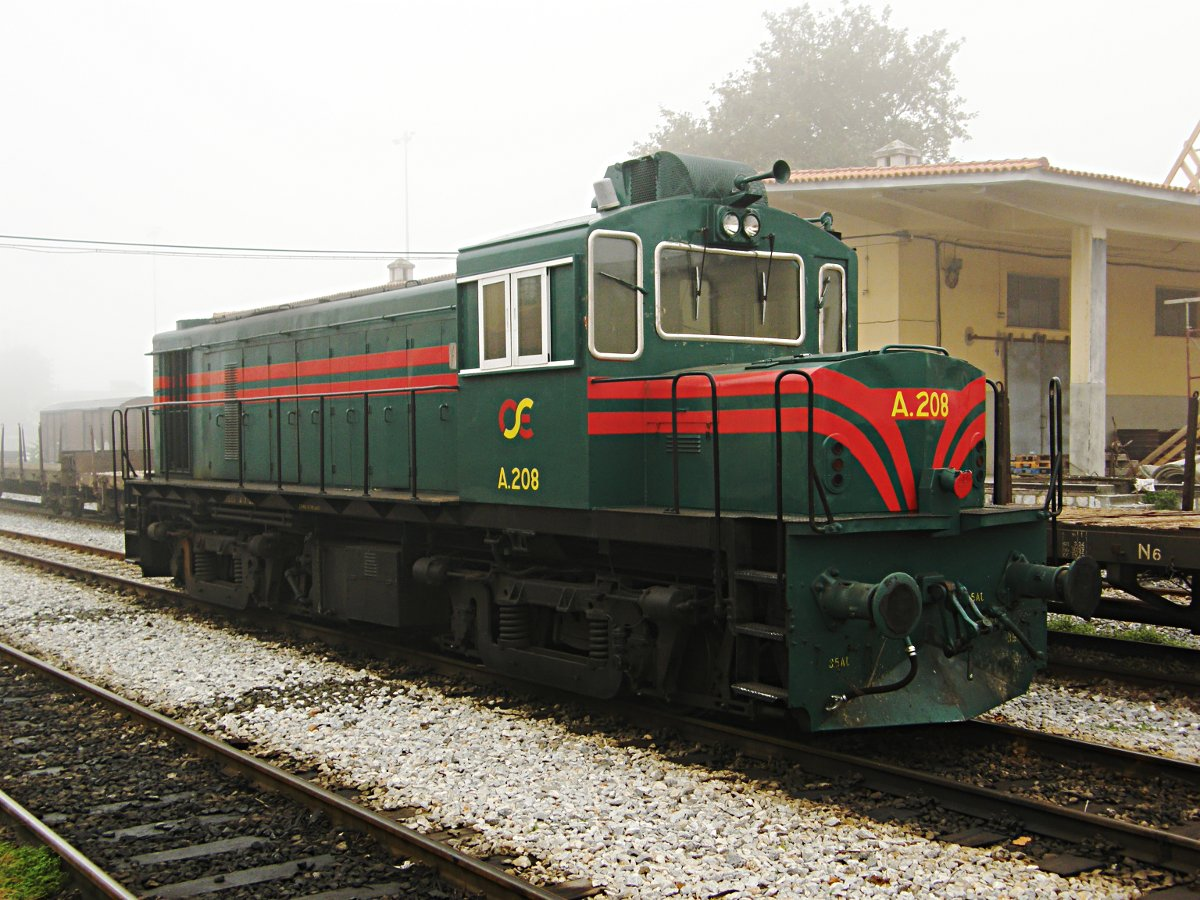
- Α.208 at Volos in 2008
Type and origin
- Model: ALCO DL532
- Build date: 1962
Specifications
- Configuration
  - AAR: Bo'Bo'
- Gauge: Standard
- Wheel diameter: 913 mm
- Wheelbase: 9.4 m
- Height: 3.65 m
- Power supply: Diesel oil
- Current pickup: Diesel
- Transmission: Electric
Performance figures
- Maximum speed: 96 km/h
- Power output: 772 kW
Career
- Operators: TrainOSE
- Numbers: A.201-A.210

The OSE class A.201, also known as the Διακοσαράκι (Diakosaraki, Little two-hundred) or Πλούτο (Pluto), after the well known cartoon, due to the generally not accepted aesthetic result of the reconstruction completed in 2010, is, along with the class A.101, the oldest locomotive operated by TRAINOSE. They were built in 1962 by Alco for SEK and were put into operation at OSE in 1971, when it was founded. It is the first diesel loco in regular use in Greece while at the same time they are the first diesel locomotive of the network and a leader of the ALCo family in Greece. Their advent was marked by the great progress towards changing the railway and the gradual abolition of the steam locomotives. It looks much like the A.321 and A.9101 classes.

The main difference from these machines is the appearance, since most A.201 were later rebuild, while A.321 and A.9101 remained the same, but it had the same gauge as A.321 (Standard), same speed as A.9101, while all three have the same manufacturers, while they are diesel-powered, while in total there are 10 such locomotive. It has an ALCo 251B / 6 diesel engine with combined power of 772 kW and reaches speeds up to 96 kilometers per hour.

They belong to the RS-8 DL-532 type. The powertrain is electric. The weight in a running order was 64 tonnes while the axle configuration is Bo Bo. When it was used for passenger routes, for the winter season, the locomotives were equipped with a boiler for the production of steam for heating in passenger cars. It is characteristic that in the locomotives cabins to date there is the metallic sign of the Greek-American friendship.

== Route ==
Today, only 2 locomotives are available, and these are A.206 and A.208 which are rarely used on freight trains. Three were destroyed (A-202, A-203 and A-207), the remnants of the A-203 are still deposited in Thessaloniki since April 1998.

== History ==
=== 1960-1980 ===
In 1961, SEK made a purchase of 10 diesel locomotives.

The new engines of the Greek Railways undertake the attraction of fast passenger and commercial trains on the Piraeus-Thessaloniki axis. In the early years, they were almost always coupled with another engine in double coupling due to their low power. With the receipt of the newest and most powerful types, such as the A-300 and A-320 classes, they will take on local and regional routes while their use will be extended to the Macedonian-Thrace network. Such a train, headed by A-207, will be involved in the long-term Doxaras accident on January 16, 1972. Later on, they will take over the fast links of the lines of Florina and Kozani. The locomotives will remain on passenger routes until the end of the 1990s on local routes. Meanwhile, the authentic green coloration with the red stripes will be replaced with the classic orange with white.

=== 1990s-today ===
By the end of the decade, they were still used on the Strymonos-Koulatas and Eidomeni-Gevgeli lines. In December 2000, the A-205 replaced a Ganz DMU series AA90 in the Larissa-Volos line. However, they are later abandoned by the passenger. However, they do not follow the fate of the remaining rows that are withdrawn, and the remaining 7 engines remain in the strength of OSE, who has decided to take advantage of their second property as a maneuvering machine and local transport. Later, the engines will undergo a lightweight rebuild, with a new cab, driving steam for better visibility during shunting, and a new sophisticated engine that was completed in 2010. The modification of their head-ons was considered unsightly. their new nickname was Pluto due to similarity to the cartoon by the same name. Only A-204 survived the interventions.

== Livery ==
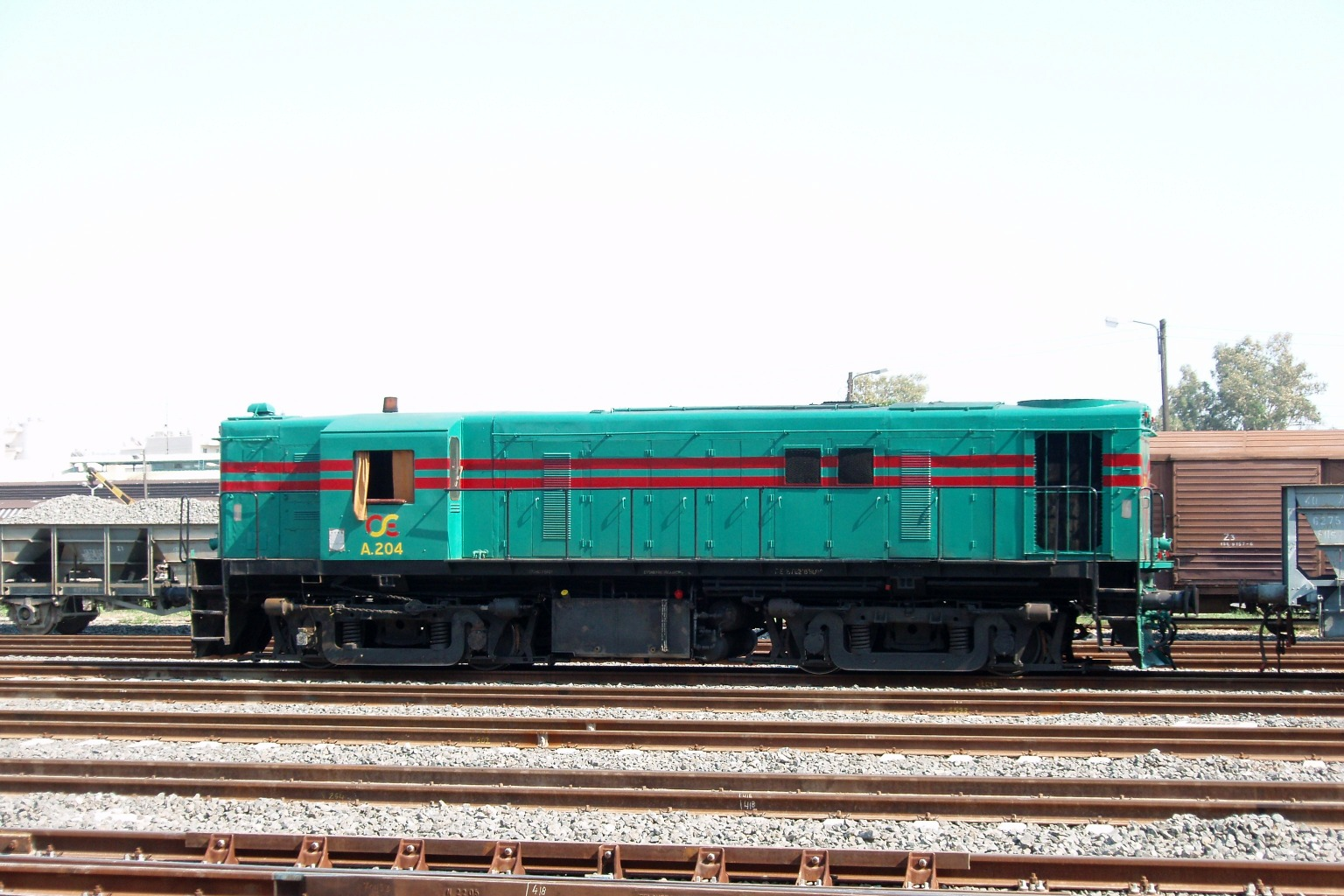
Class A.201 locomotive as it was before the modifications. Here is A.204 at the Rentis Depot in 2007

The livery of the locomotives consists of orange-red horizontal strips on a green color covering the largest surface of the vehicles. In the head-ons the strips join, forming a triangle. This coloring was their original coloring before joining OSE. Now all A.201 diesel engines in Greece are painted orange with white stripes, although from the late 1990s onwards they returned to their old coloring.
