= SEK class Iota-alpha =

Class of 20 Greek 2-8-2 locomotives

SEK Class Ια
Type and origin
- Power type: Steam
- Builder: American Locomotive Company
- Order number: S-1092
- Build date: 1915
Specifications
- Configuration
  - Whyte: 2-8-2
  - UIC: 1′D1′ h2
- Gauge: 1,435 mm (4 ft 8 1/2 in)
- Driver dia.: 1,524 mm (5 ft 0 in)
- Length
  - Over beams: 20.231 m (66 ft 4 1/2 in)
- Adhesive weight: 60 tonnes (59 long tons; 66 short tons)
- Loco weight: 84.4 tonnes (83.1 long tons; 93.0 short tons)
- Fuel type: Coal
- Firebox
  - Grate area: 3.0 m^{2} (32 sq ft)
- Boiler pressure: 12 kg/cm^{2} (1,180 kPa; 171 psi)
- Heating surface: 179.0 m^{2} (1,927 sq ft)
- Superheater
  - Heating area: 38.1 m^{2} (410 sq ft)
- Cylinders: Two, outside
- Cylinder size: 584 by 660 millimetres (23 in × 26 in)
Career
- Operators: SEK
- Numbers: 401–420 → 701–720

SEK (Sidirodromoi Ellinikou Kratous, Hellenic State Railways) Class Ια (or Class Ia; Iota-alpha) is a class of twenty 2-8-2 steam locomotives purchased from the American Locomotive Company (Alco) in 1915.

They were given the class letters "Ια" and initially numbered 401 to 420, but were later renumbered 701 to 720.
