= OSE class A.501 =

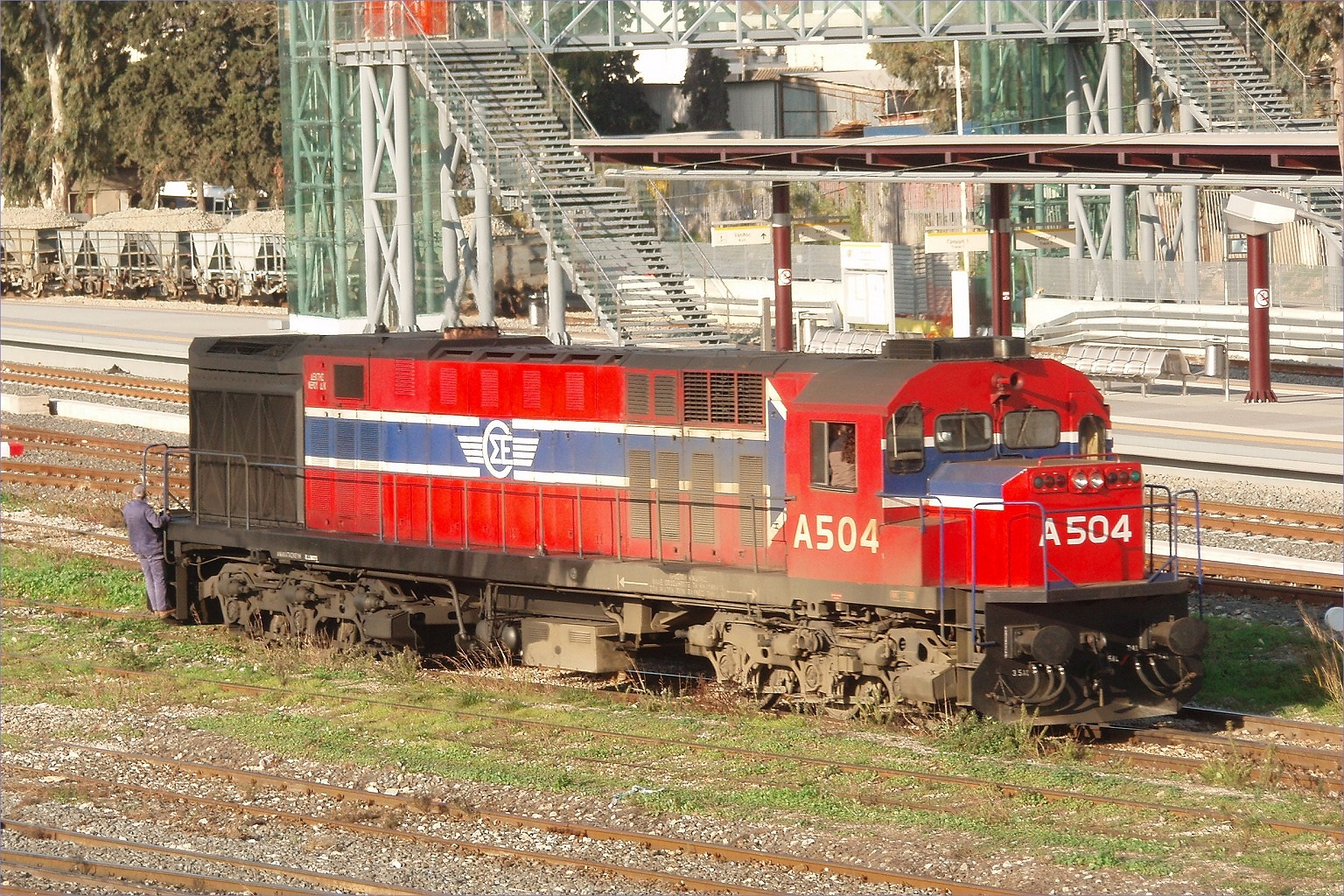
- A.504 in Agios Ioannis Rentis in 2007
Type and origin
- Build date: 1974
Specifications
- Configuration
  - AAR: Co'Co'
- Gauge: Standard
- Wheel diameter: 1 m.
- Height: 4,54 m
- Power supply: Diesel oil
- Current pickup: Diesel
- Transmission: Helectric
Performance figures
- Maximum speed: 150 km/h
- Power output: 2684 kW
Career
- Operators: TrainOSE
- Numbers: Α.501-Α.512

OSE class A.501, also known as 500άρα (500ara, "Big 500"). or Καναδέζα (Kanadeza, "Canadian"), is a series of diesel-electric locomotives operated by TRAINOSE. This locomotive was built in 1974 at by MLW and was put into operation by OSE in 1975. Outwardly they resemble the class A.451 locomotive with the main difference that they are of higher power and have different appearance before rebuilding as they did not have an elevated head-on with steam heating boiler. This did not allow them to be used in passenger cars during the winter, although they had electric heating.

However, they have the same manufacturers and power supply as they are in standard gauge. They run unilaterally, while they have the capability of running coupled up to 2 units (Sometimes it can also be A.501 class locomotive). Altogether, there are 10 such locomotive that have an ALCo 251 engine with combined power of 3,350 kW and reach speeds of up to 112 kilometers per hour

== Route ==
The A.501 series engines serve large commercial trains. They were used extraordinarily in passenger trains.

Today only 6 locomotives are available, and these are A.501, A.504. A.506, A.507, A.509 and A.510.

== History ==
=== 1970s ===
With the establishment of OSE in 1971, deficiencies in rolling stock were identified. The era of steam is over and available diesel locomotives are not enough. On the standard line, the A 201, A 301, A 321, A 351, A 401 and A 221 class locomotives had low power compared to the predicted needs. To supply 30 new units, the American brand was again selected, but this time, its Canadian branch, Montreal Locomotive Works. Although the American title, the abbreviation is expressed in the German "Em-El-Be" (MLW). The A 501 series was the MX-636 model, with a Co'Co shaft configuration and 3350 horsepower. Numbers A. 501 to A.510 were numbered. They were the last locomotives for Greek Railways produced outside Europe. It was at that time the largest and most locomotives in Greece until the A.551 class locomotives were put into service.

Although in the early years they encountered engine problems, with a 12% drop since 1980, they remained the most reliable machines with the lowest degree of immobility.

Since retirement of the A-551 series in July 98, the MX636 is again the strongest locomotive in Greece. Most actions take place inside and outside Thessaloniki on the lines of Athens, Kozani and Alexandroupolis, mainly freight. Despite the philosophy of the work, it still appears on the Edomeni-FYROM line.

=== 2000s-today ===
It is indicative that after nearly 30 years of intense circulation they decided to rebuild them, they were almost all in full operation, except for A.502 and A.505.

At the end of August 2000, the A-504 was shipped to the US for a reconstruction project. The remaining seven MX636s will be rebuilt in Greece after the successful rebuilding of the A-504.

Meanwhile, A-504 returned completely rebuilt. Up to now, A-501 and A-508 have been rebuilt in the OTE's Piraeus Factory.

== Livery ==
The color of the locomotives consists of a blue horizontal strip with a white contour which ends in an arrow in an orange-red color covering the largest surface of the vehicles. Before the modifications, the vehicles were orange with yellow horizontal strips that ended up in triangles in the head-ons.
