= Kozani–Amyntaio railway =

Railway line in Greece

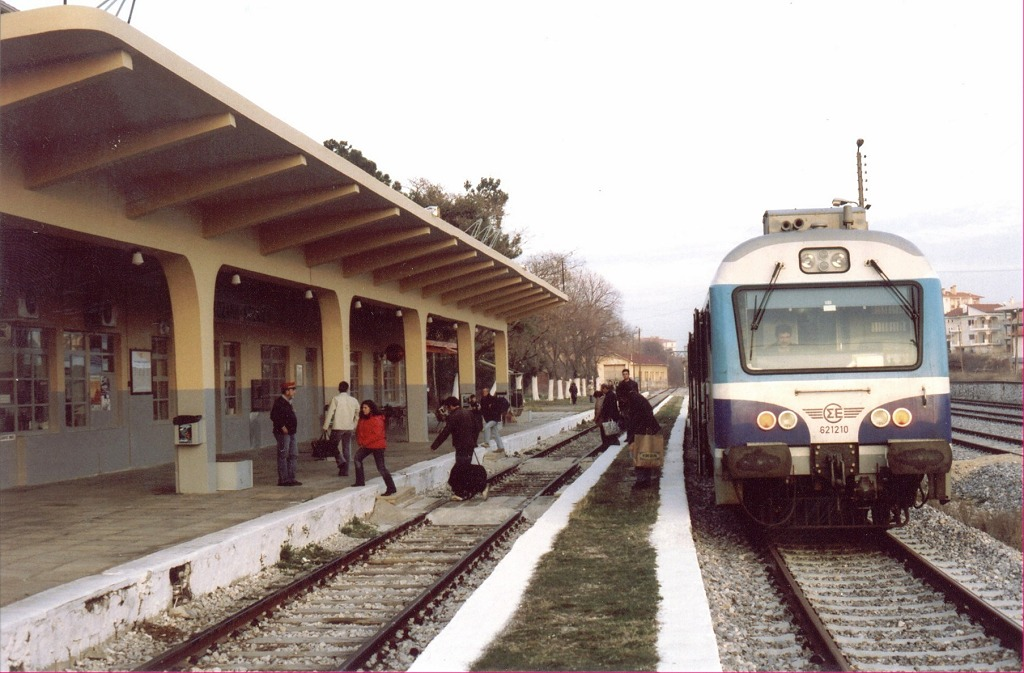
- A Class 621 (MAN-2000) DMU at Kozani Station in March 2007, a few weeks after reopening the line, March 2007

Overview
- Status: Mothballed
- Owner: GAIAOSE
- Locale: Greece (Central Macedonia, East Macedonia and Thrace)
- Termini: Kozani 40.294662°N 21.792818°E; Amyntaio 40.690846°N 21.686308°E
- Stations: 12

Service
- Type: railway line
- Services: Regional
- Operator(s): Hellenic Train

History
- Opened: 30 January 1955; 70 years ago
- Closed: 2010

Technical
- Line length: 59.4 km (36.9 mi)
- Number of tracks: single track
- Track gauge: 1,435 mm (4 ft 8 1/2 in) standard gauge
- Electrification: No
- Operating speed: 130 km/h (81 mph) (highest)

The Kozani–Amyntaio railway line is a 1,435 mm (4 ft 8 1/2 in) (standard gauge) 59.4-kilometre (36.9 mi) long railway line of OSE connecting Kozani and Amyntaio in Greece. The line has been closed to passengers since 2010.

== Course ==
The western terminus of the Kozani–Amyntaio railway is the Kozani. The line passes through the eastern side of Ptolemaida, the factories and mines of the Public Electricity Company and ends in the south of the city of Kozani. The line is 59.4 km (36.9 mi) long and of normal width.

== Stations ==
The main stations on the Kozani–Amyntaio railway are:

- Amyntaio railway station
- Ptolemaida railway station
- Kozani railway station

== History ==
Construction of the line for the former Hellenic State Railways started in January 1951 and was completed in 1954, with the inauguration on 30 January 1955; 70 years ago. It is a branch of the Thessaloniki–Bitola railway, which began operations in 1894. The line served the town of Ptolemaida, and connects to the lignite-fired power plants of Public Power Corporation (ΔΕΗ) at Komanos freight station. Its construction was completed in December 1954. The terminal station is in the southern part of the city of Kozani.

Initially, the line was planned to be part of the Kalambaka-Grevena-Kozani railway line. In 1925, the construction of that line that would connect Kalambaka with Kozani began with awarding the contract to the Belgian company "Société commerciale de Belgique". The crash of 1929, however, led to a serious financial crisis in Greece, with the result that the Belgian company never completed it due to non-payment by the Greek government. After the Second World War, it was decided to connect Kozani to the railway network through Amyntaio and the original plan for a connection with Thessaly was abandoned. Industrial branch lines connect to the PPC power plants of Ptolemais and Agios Dimitrios, normally used by freight trains carrying light fuel oil. Another branch line to the former fertilizer plant of AEVAL is disused. The line is also used by freight trains carrying sugar beats from the Hellenic Sugar Industry factory to Platy.

Renovations were carried out between 2003 and 2007 on 22 January 2007, it was reopened with three trains daily, which departed from Kozani, arriving in Thessaloniki in three hours (instead of four hours before the renovation).

From 1 August 2009, the passenger services were reduced to only one train per day and the passenger services were withdrawn completely in 2010, as part of the reorganization of Trainose, and under the pretext that the line was considered unprofitable, depriving the prefecture of Kozani and the cities of Ptolemaida and Kozani of a rail connection. Indicatively, it was mentioned that the journey from Kozani to Thessaloniki took 3 hours with the IC 60/61 Pavlos Melas, while with the KTEL buses, via Egnatia Odos the journey took 1.5 hours). Infrequent freight trains still use the line to reach the PPC power-generating stations.

== Service ==
In 2007 services resumed after repairs were carried out on the trackbed. In 2009 services were reduced to one train per day. In 2010, services were suspended as part of the reorganization of Trainose, and under the pretext that the line was considered unprofitable, depriving the prefecture of Kozani and the cities of Ptolemaida and Kozani of rail communication. Indicatively, it was mentioned that the journey from Kozani to Thessaloniki lasted 3 hours with the IC 60/61 Pavlos Melas, while with the KTEL buses, via Egnatia Odos it is 1.5 hours).

For the expansion of D.E.H. 's lignite mines, since January 2014, the line has been cut between the AEVAL and Pontokomi areas for a length of approximately 9-kilometre (5.6 mi). In 2019 the Special Urban Development Study of the Kozani Railway Station was approved. however passenger services have yet to recommence.

== See also ==
- Hellenic Railways Organisation
