= Perivolaki – Nea Zichni railway line =

Railway line in Greece

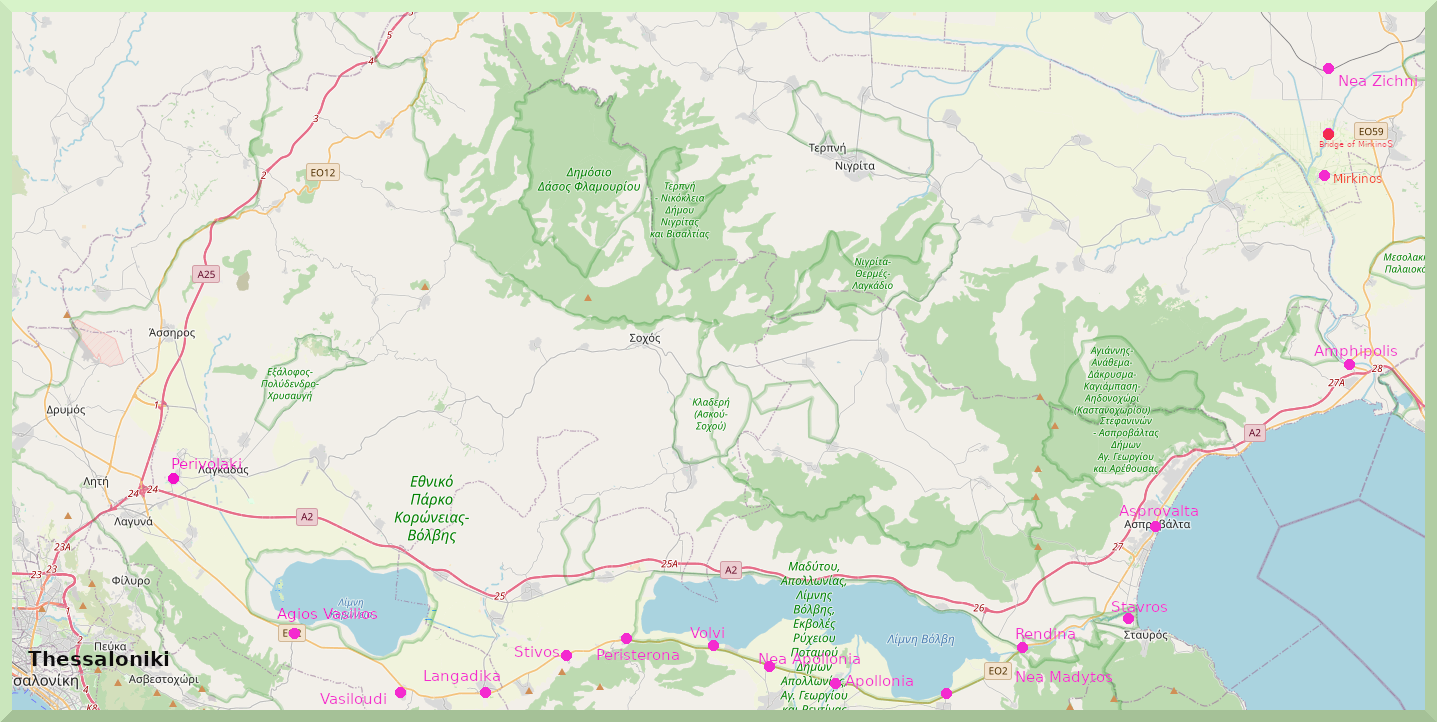
Stations along the Perivolaki–Nea Zichni railway line

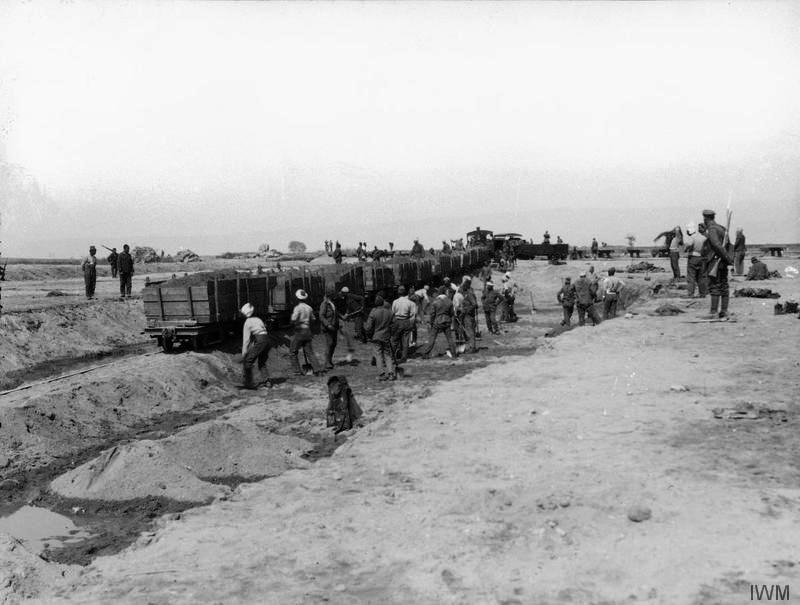
Turkish prisoners of war working on the construction of the Sarakli-Stavros line

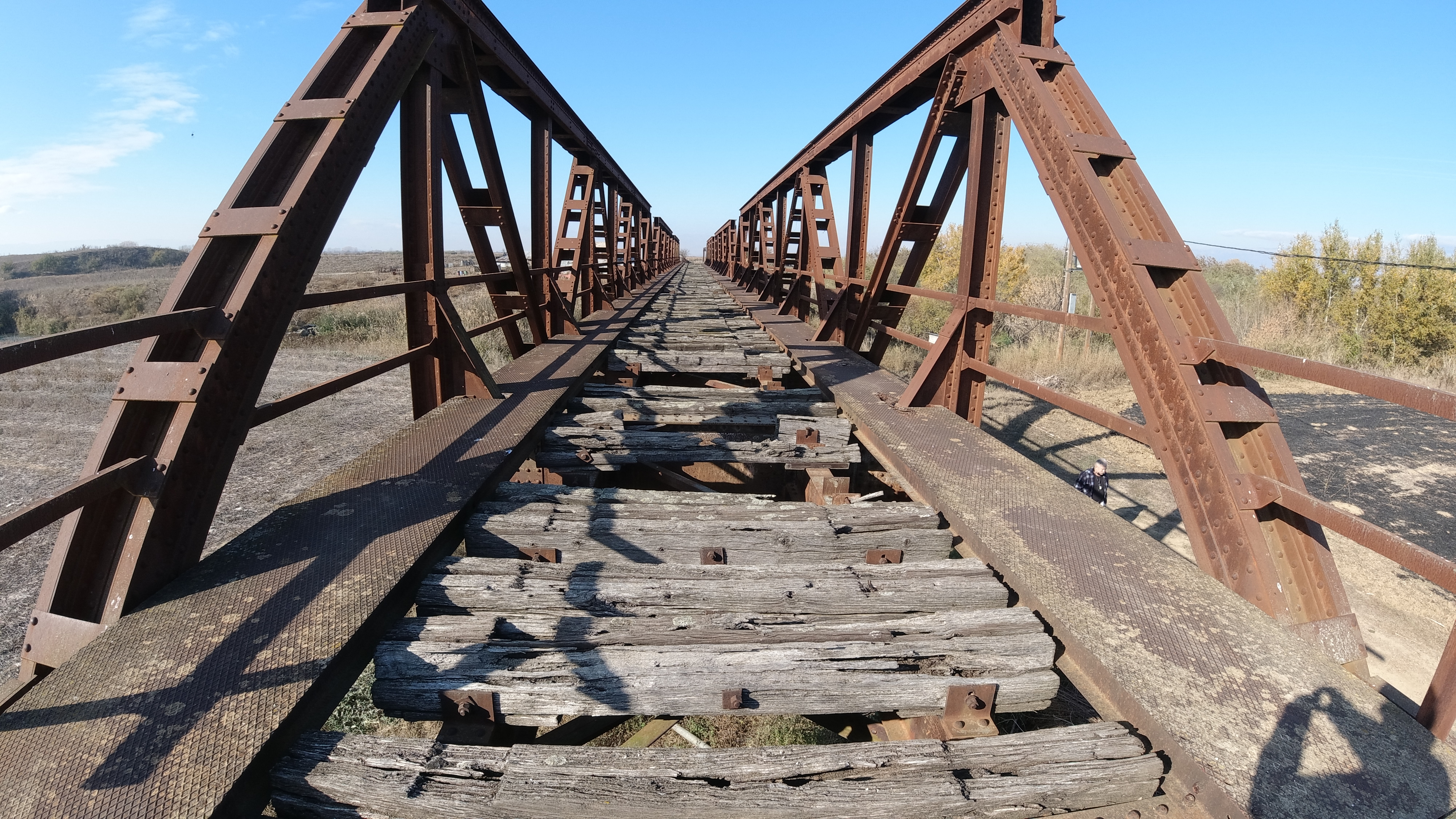
Railway bridge on the former Perivolaki – Nea Zichni line near Myrkinos

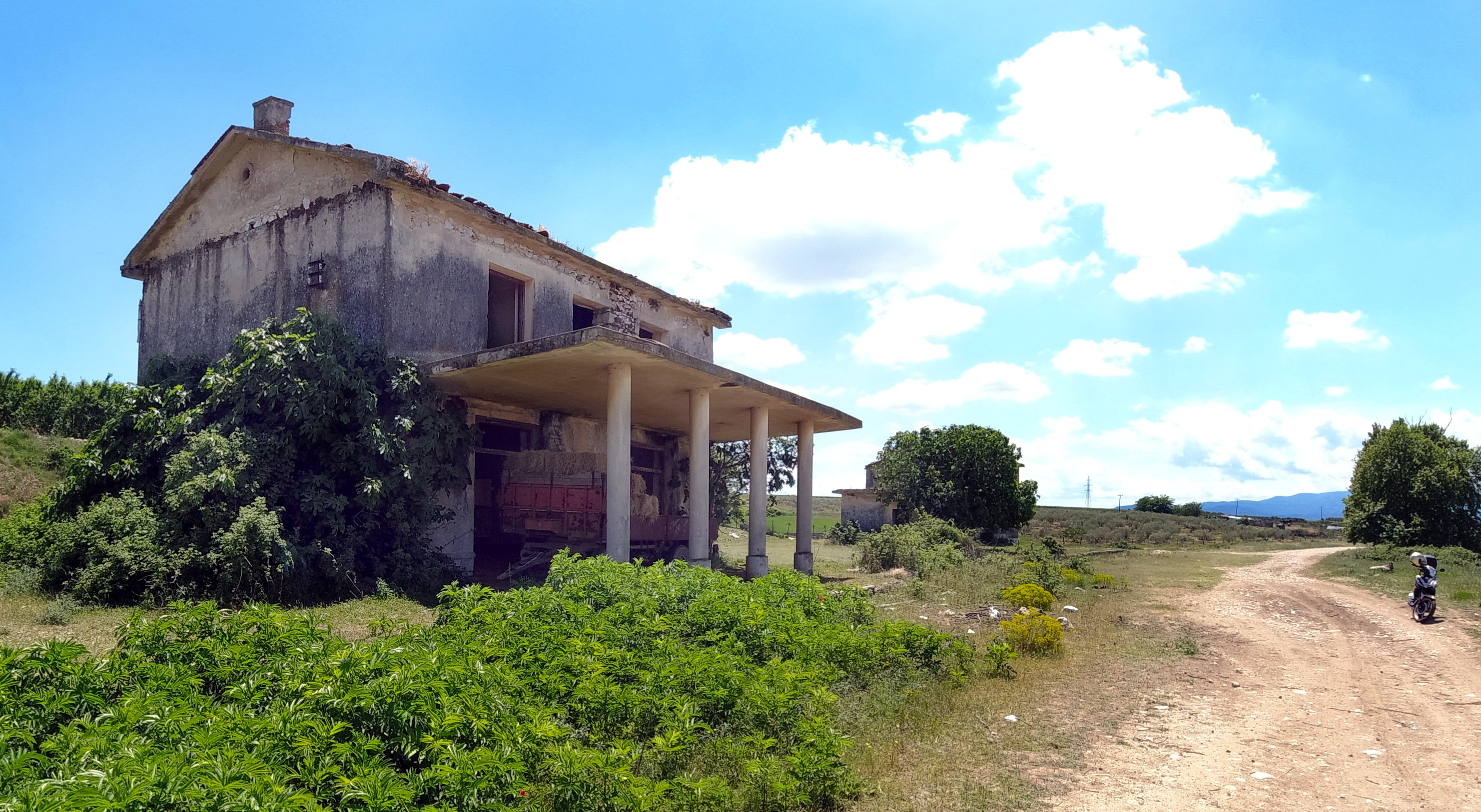
The last remaining station on the line at Myrkinos

The Perivolaki – Nea Zichni railway (also called Saraklis–Stavros) was a narrow-gauge railway (600 mm (1 ft 11 5/8 in) gauge) in Greece.

== Route ==
The western starting point of the railway line was Perivolaki (formerly: Sarakli), a village about 20 km northeast of the city center of Thessaloniki. From Perivolaki the route ran first in a southerly, then in an easterly direction to the port of Stavros on the Strymonian Gulf. From Stavros the route ran north again via Amfipoli to the station Nea Zichni (formerly: Mirini), which runs between Mirini (Μυρρίνη) and Dimitra (Δήμητρα) southeast of Serres is also again on the Thessaloniki – Alexandroupoli railway line.

The stops on the route were: Perivolaki (Sarakli) (0 km; 0 mi), Toumba (5.8 km; 3.6 mi), Agios Vasilios (10.1 km; 6.3 mi), Vasiloudi (19.0 km; 11.8 mi), Langadikia (23.6 km; 14.7 mi), Stivos (28.5 km; 17.7 mi), Peristerona (32.4 km; 20.1 mi), Volvi (38.1 km; 23.7 mi), Nea Apollonia 42.4 km; 26.3 mi), Apollonia (43.2 km; 26.8 mi), Nea Madytos (52.1 km; 32.4 mi), Rendina (57.0 km; 35.4 mi), Stási (63.4 km; 39.4 mi), Stavros (66.1 km; 41.1 mi), Asprovalta (ca. 70 km; 43 mi), Tasli (ca. 75 km; 47 mi), Amfipoli (ca. 100 km; 62 mi), Myrkinos (ca. 112 km; 70 mi), Nea Zichni (ca. 130 km; 81 mi).

== History ==
The line was built during First World War 1917 on the Saloniki-frontline. It was measured until October 1917, built by the British military and Turkish prisoners of war from November 14, 1917, and opened on April 1, 1918. It was intended to transport soldiers, building materials, weapons, ammunition and supplies to the front and, in the opposite direction, to transport the wounded to the hospitals. Due to changes in the course of the front, it had to be shortened at its western end first to Tasli (approx. 75 route km (47 route mi)), later to Asprovalta (approx. 70 route km (43 route mi)). . In this condition, it was handed over to the Greek State Railways (Sidirodromoi Ellinikou Kratous / SEK) on June 1, 1920. The S.E.K. use began in May 1921.

During the German occupation of Greece in World War II the route was in the German occupation zone. The Wehrmacht tried to rebuild the dismantled part of the route to Amfipoli, but failed. In Amfipoli, a standard-gauge branch line branching off the Thessaloniki – Alexandroupoli railway ended in 1938.

After the end of the Second World War, the route was abandoned on August 16, 1947. The 25 km (16 mi) long line from Nea Zichni (Mirini) to Amphipolis (1931) was abandoned and the track was lifted in 1970.

Today you can hardly find any traces of the railway line apart from a railway bridge and ruins of station buildings near Myrkinos.

== Technical parameters ==
The line was built in the usual gauge of 600 mm (1 ft 11 5/8 in) for light railways, the superstructure being designed for 1,435 mm (4 ft 8 1/2 in) standard gauge, which was never used. At the time of its greatest expansion, the route was about 100 km (62 mi) long.
