= Alexandreia railway station =

Railway station of Skydra in Central Macedonia, Greece

Αλεξάνδρεια Alexandreia
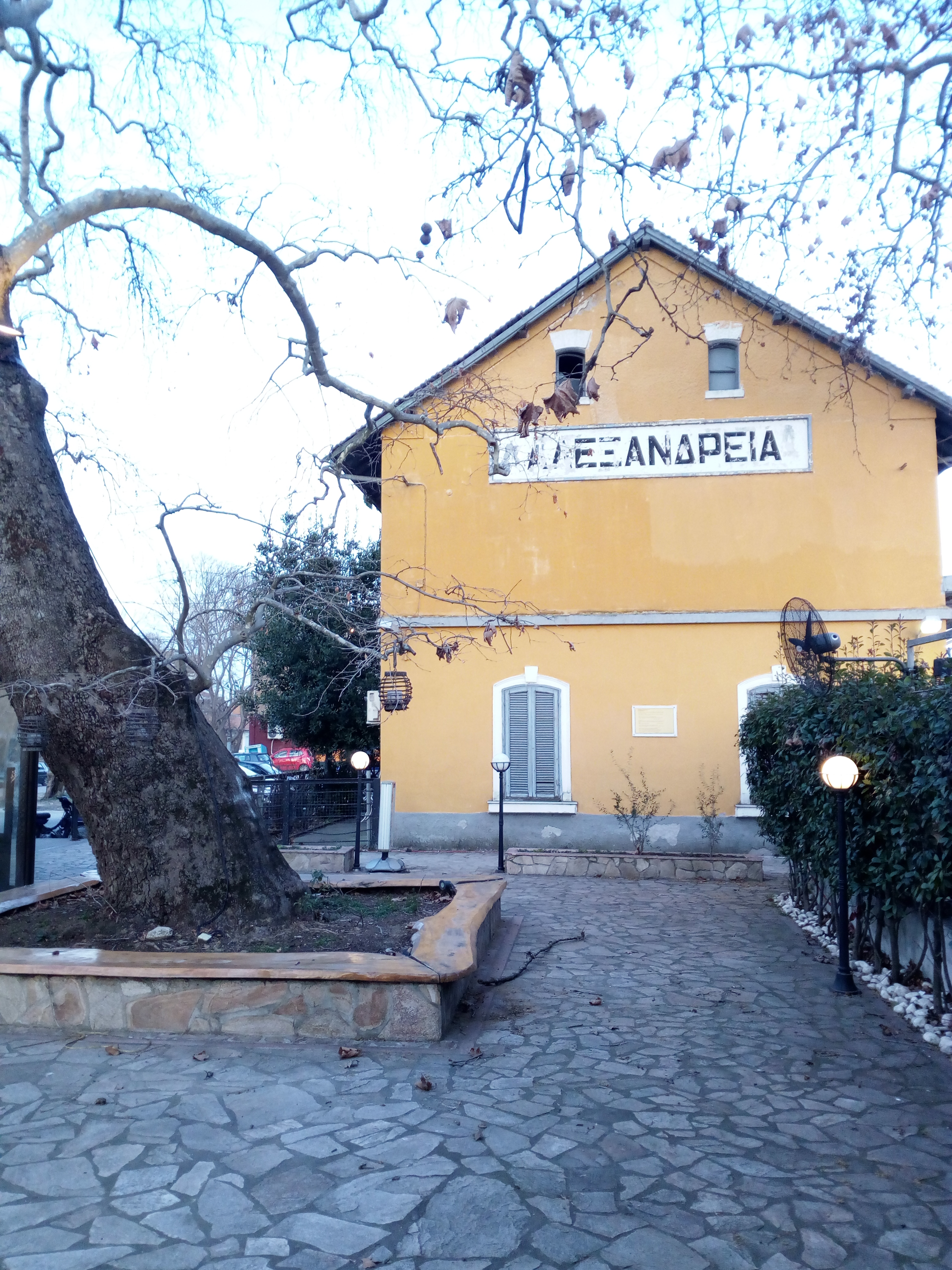
- Alexandreia station building in Feb 2020

General information
- Location: Alexandria 593 00, Imathia; Greece
- Coordinates: 40°37′14″N 22°26′34″E
- Owner: GAIAOSE
- Operator: Hellenic Train
- Line: Thessaloniki–Bitola railway
- Platforms: 4 (3 disused)
- Tracks: 5 (1 in use)

Construction
- Structure type: at-grade
- Platform levels: 1
- Parking: Yes
- Cycle facilities: No

Other information
- Status: Staffed
- Website: http://www.ose.gr/en/

History
- Opened: 1892
- Rebuilt: 1894 (station building built)
- Former names: Gidas

Services
Preceding station	Regional Rail	Following station
Loutros towards Florina	Line T2	Lianovergion towards Thessaloniki
Location
- Location within Greece

The Alexandreia railway station (Greek: Σιδηροδρομικός σταθμός Αλεξάνδρεια, romanized: Sidirodromikós stathmós Aleksándreia) is the railway station of Skydra in Central Macedonia, Greece. The station is located near the centre of the settlement, on the Thessaloniki–Bitola railway, and is severed by the Thessaloniki Regional Railway (formerly the Suburban Railway).

== History ==
Opened 9 December 1892 as Gidas railway station (Greek: Σιδηροδρομικός σταθμός Γιδάς, romanized: Sidirodromikós stathmós Gidàs) in what was then the Ottoman Empire at the completion of the first section of the Société du Chemin de Fer ottoman Salonique-Monastir, a branchline of the Chemins de fer Orientaux from Thessaloniki to Bitola. During this period, Northern Greece and the southern Balkans were still under Ottoman rule, and Alexandreia was known as Gidas. In its first year of operation, the section south of the station saw 43,555 passengers, 21,564 tonnes of freight, revenue of 4,617.62 gold francs per km and expenditure of 3,123.59 gold francs per km, encouraged the line to be extended from Skydra to Bitolia in 1894. Alexandreia was annexed by Greece on 18 October 1912 during the First Balkan War. During the war, the station was used as a centre of operations for the Greek army, as it had a telegraph office. On 17 October 1925 The Greek government purchased the Greek sections of the former Salonica Monastir railway and the railway became part of the Hellenic State Railways, with the remaining section north of Florina seeded to Yugoslavia. In 1953 the station, along with the settlement, was renamed Alexandreia. During the civil war, Kouloura bridge was damaged, and as a result, passengers were transported by bus to Agra. In 1970 OSE became the legal successor to the SEK, taking over responsibilities for most of Greece's rail infrastructure. On 1 January 1971, the station and most of the Greek rail infrastructure were transferred to the Hellenic Railways Organisation S.A., a state-owned corporation. Freight traffic declined sharply when the state-imposed monopoly of OSE for the transport of agricultural products and fertilisers ended in the early 1990s. Many small stations of the network with little passenger traffic were closed down.

In 2001 the infrastructure element of OSE was created, known as GAIAOSE; it would henceforth be responsible for the maintenance of stations, bridges and other elements of the network, as well as the leasing and the sale of railway assists. In 2003, OSE launched "Proastiakos SA", as a subsidiary to serve the operation of the suburban network in the urban complex of Athens during the 2004 Olympic Games. In 2005, TrainOSE was created as a brand within OSE to concentrate on rail services and passenger interface.

Since 2007, the station is served by the Thessaloniki Regional Railway. In 2008, all Proastiakos were transferred from OSE to TrainOSE. In 2009, with the Greek debt crisis unfolding OSE's Management was forced to reduce services across the network. Timetables were cutback and routes closed as the government-run entity attempted to reduce overheads. In 2017 OSE's passenger transport sector was privatised as TrainOSE, currently a wholly owned subsidiary of Ferrovie dello Stato Italiane infrastructure, including stations, remained under the control of OSE.

The station is owned by GAIAOSE, which since 3 October 2001 owns most railway stations in Greece: the company was also in charge of rolling stock from December 2014 until October 2025, when Greek Railways (the owner of the Thessaloniki–Bitola railway) took over that responsibility.

== Facilities ==
The station is still housed in the original brick-built station building. As of (2021) The station is staffed with a working ticket office. The station currently has three platforms; however, only two are currently in use. There are waiting rooms on platform one and waiting shelters on 2. Access to the platforms is via crossing the lines; however not wheelchair accessible. The platforms have shelters with seating; however, there are no Dot-matrix display departure and arrival screens or timetable poster boards on the platforms. There is also Parking in the forecourt.

== Services ==
In 1892 trains departed daily from Thessaloniki at 06.50 and arrived at 08.00 in Kerzalar, at 08.39 in Guida, at 09.41 in Karaferia, at 10.12 in August (Naoussa) and at 10.49 in Vertekop. From there the train departed for Thessaloniki at 12.19 and arrived at 12.52 in August, at 13.28 in Karaferia, at 14.25 in Guida, on 15.04 in Kerzalar and on 16.09 in Thessaloniki.

As of September 2026, Line T2 of the Thessaloniki Regional Railway calls at this station: service is currently limited compared to October 2012, with three trains per day to Thessaloniki, two trains per day to Florina (via Edessa), and one train per day to Edessa.

There are currently no services to Bitola in North Macedonia, because the international connection from Mesonisi to Neos Kafkasos is currently disused.

== Station Layout ==
L Ground/Concourse	Customer service	Tickets/Exits
Platform 2	non-regular use
Level; L1	Side platform, doors will open on the right
Level; L1	Platform 3	non-regular use
Level; L1	Island platform, doors will open on the right
Level; L1	Platform 1a	towards Thessaloniki (Platy) ←
Level; L1	Platform 1b	towards Florina (Loytros) →
Level; L1	Island platform, doors on the right/left

== See also ==
- Railway stations in Greece
- Hellenic Railways Organization
- Hellenic Train
- Proastiakos
