= Lianovergion railway station =

Railway station in Imathia, Greece

Λιανοβέργι Lianovergi

General information
- Location: Alexandria 590 32; Imathia; Greece
- Coordinates: 40.630194°N 22.504404°E
- Owner: GAIAOSE
- Operator: Hellenic Train
- Line: Thessaloniki–Bitola railway
- Platforms: 1 side platform
- Tracks: 1

Construction
- Structure type: at-grade
- Parking: No
- Cycle facilities: No

Other information
- Status: Unstaffed
- Website: http://www.ose.gr/en/

History
- Opened: 1970?

Services
Preceding station	Regional Rail	Following station
Alexandreia towards Florina	Line T2	Platy towards Thessaloniki
Location
- Location within Greece

Lianovergion railway station (Greek: Σιδηροδρομικός σταθμός Λιανοβέργι, romanized: Sidirodromikos Stathmos Lianovergion) is a currently closed railway station in Lianovergi, Greece. It was opened by the OSE. Located just south of the centre of the settlement, the station is not much more than a request halt, on the Thessaloniki–Bitola railway, and is severed by the Thessaloniki Regional Railway (formerly the Suburban Railway).

== History ==
On 1 January 1971, the station and most of the Greek rail infrastructure were transferred to the Hellenic Railways Organisation S.A., a state-owned corporation. Freight traffic declined sharply when the state-imposed monopoly of OSE for the transport of agricultural products and fertilisers ended in the early 1990s. Many small stations of the network with little passenger traffic were closed down.

In 2001 the infrastructure element of OSE was created, known as GAIAOSE; it would henceforth be responsible for the maintenance of stations, bridges and other elements of the network, as well as the leasing and the sale of railway assists. In 2003, OSE launched "Proastiakos SA", as a subsidiary to serve the operation of the suburban network in the urban complex of Athens during the 2004 Olympic Games. In 2005, TrainOSE was created as a brand within OSE to concentrate on rail services and passenger interface.

Since 2007, the station is served by the Thessaloniki Regional Railway. In 2008, all Proastiakos were transferred from OSE to TrainOSE. In 2009, with the Greek debt crisis unfolding OSE's Management was forced to reduce services across the network. Timetables were cutback and routes closed as the government-run entity attempted to reduce overheads. In 2017 OSE's passenger transport sector was privatised as TrainOSE, currently a wholly owned subsidiary of Ferrovie dello Stato Italiane infrastructure, including stations, remained under the control of OSE.

The station is owned by GAIAOSE, which since 3 October 2001 owns most railway stations in Greece: the company was also in charge of rolling stock from December 2014 until October 2025, when Greek Railways (the owner of the Thessaloniki–Bitola railway) took over that responsibility.

== Facilities ==
The station is equipped solely with a waiting room on the single platform.

== Services ==
As of September 2026, Line T2 of the Thessaloniki Regional Railway calls at this station: service is currently limited compared to October 2012, with three trains per day to Thessaloniki, two trains per day to Florina (via Edessa), and one train per day to Edessa.

== Accidents and incidents ==
=== 2015 accident ===
On 11 July 2015, a 46-year-old woman died after being hit by a train close to the station. According to the police, the incident happened at 12.10, when, for unknown reasons, a passenger train, running from Florina to Thessaloniki, just before the Lianovergi station, dragged the woman, a local from Paleochori along the line. Trains in the area stopped for about an hour while an investigation was conducted.

=== 2016 accident ===
On 11 July 2015, a 28-year-old died after being hit by a train a few meters from the station. Preliminary investigation into the exact causes of the accident was carried out by the Plateos Police Department.

== Station layout ==
Ground level		Exit
Level; Ε1	Side platform, doors will open on the right/left
Level; Ε1	Platform 1a	towards Thessaloniki (Platy) →
Level; Ε1	Platform 1b	towards Florina (Alexandreia) ←
