= Katerini railway station =

Railway station in Katerini, Central Macedonia, Greece

Κατερίνη Katerini
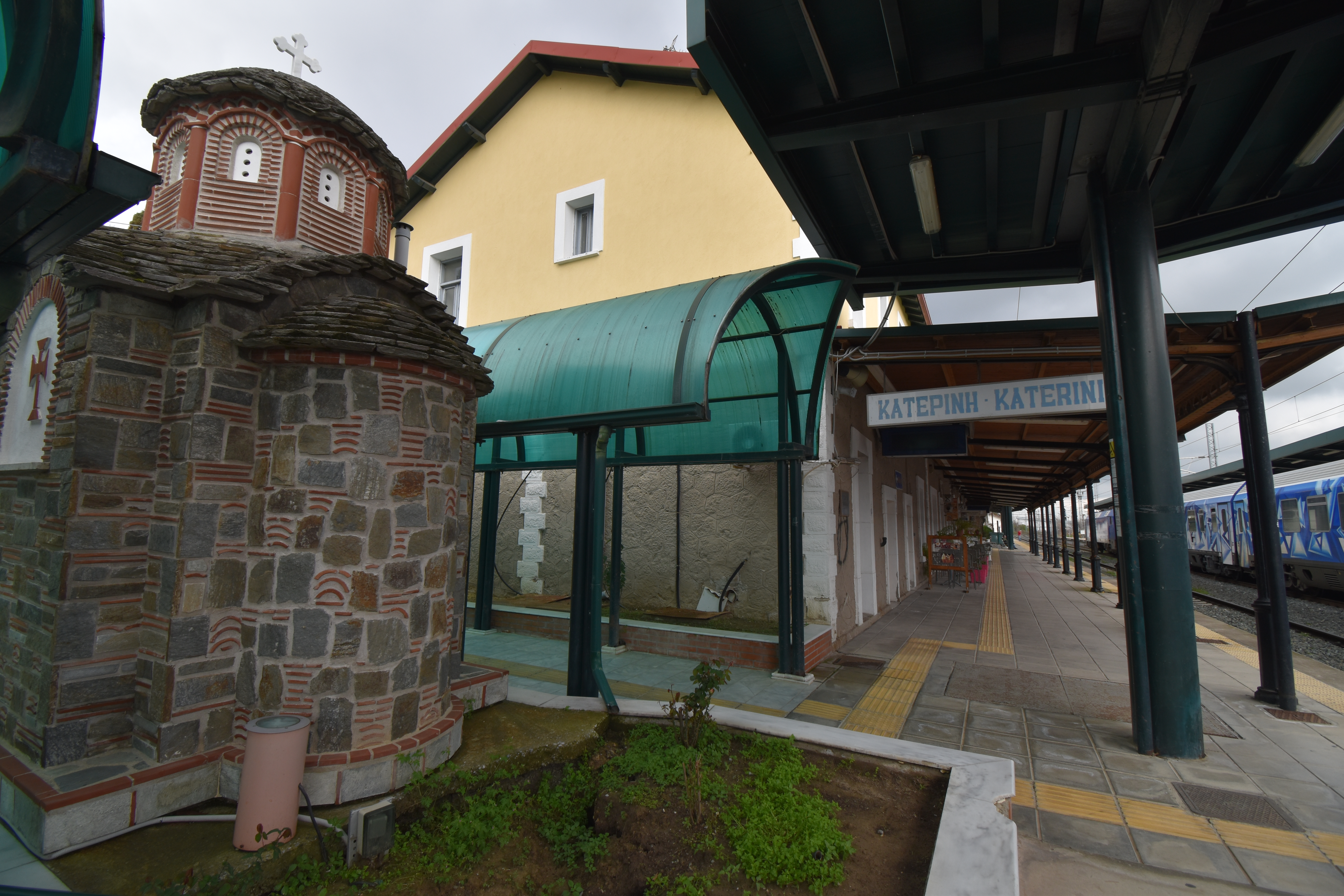
- Katerini railway station and the church on its platform

General information
- Location: Katerini 601 00, Greece; Pieria; Greece
- Coordinates: 40°16′07″N 22°31′53″E
- Owner: GAIAOSE
- Operator: Hellenic Train
- Line: Piraeus–Platy railway
- Platforms: 8 (2 disused)
- Tracks: 6

Construction
- Structure type: at-grade
- Platform levels: 1
- Parking: Yes

Other information
- Status: Staffed
- Website: http://www.ose.gr/en/

History
- Rebuilt: 9 September 2007
- Electrified: 25 kV 50 Hz AC
- Former names: Katerinas

Services
Preceding station	Hellenic Train	Following station
Larissa towards Athens	C1 Athens-Thessaloniki	Platy towards Thessaloniki
Preceding station	Regional Rail	Following station
Litochoro towards Larissa	Line T1	Korinos towards Thessaloniki
Location
- Location within Greece

Katerini railway station (Greek: Σιδηροδρομικός σταθμός Κατερίνης, romanized: Sidirodromikos stathmos Katerinis) is a railway station in Katerini, Central Macedonia, Greece. Located in a residential area close to the city centre, it opened on 2 September 1916. It is served by trains between Athens and Thessaloniki, and since 9 September 2007, it has been served by the Thessaloniki Regional Railway (formerly the Suburban Railway).

== History ==
The station opened on 2 September 1916 as Katerinas when the connecting branch Papapouli-Platy was completed, which connected the Piraeus-Demerli-Sinoron Railway (S.P.D.S.) or “Larissaykos” with the Macedonia-Thrace network.

On 17 October 1925, The Greek government purchased the Greek sections of the former Salonica Monastir railway, and the railway became part of the Hellenic State Railways, with the remaining section north of Florina seeded to Yugoslavia. In 1970 OSE became the legal successor to the SEK, taking over responsibilities for most of Greece's rail infrastructure. On 1 January 1971, the station and most of the Greek rail infrastructure were transferred to the Hellenic Railways Organisation S.A., a state-owned corporation. In 2001 the infrastructure element of OSE was created, known as GAIAOSE; it would henceforth be responsible for the maintenance of stations, bridges and other elements of the network, as well as the leasing and the sale of railway assists. In 2003, OSE launched "Proastiakos SA", as a subsidiary to serve the operation of the suburban network in the urban complex of Athens during the 2004 Olympic Games. In 2005, TrainOSE was created as a brand within OSE to concentrate on rail services and passenger interface. The station reopened on 9 September 2007 as part of upgrades to the line to allow Thessaloniki Regional Railway services to access the line. In 2008, all Proastiakos were transferred from OSE to TrainOSE.

In 2009, with the Greek debt crisis unfolding OSE's Management was forced to reduce services across the network. Timetables were cut back, and routes closed as the government-run entity attempted to reduce overheads. In 2015 a 15-year-old child was airlifted to a hospital after being electrocuted at the station. In 2017 OSE's passenger transport sector was privatised as TrainOSE, currently, a wholly owned subsidiary of Ferrovie dello Stato Italiane infrastructure, including stations, remained under the control of OSE.

The station is owned by GAIAOSE, which since 3 October 2001 owns most railway stations in Greece: the company was also in charge of rolling stock from December 2014 until October 2025, when Greek Railways (the owner of the Piraeus–Platy railway) took over that responsibility.

== Facilities ==
The station is still housed in the original early 20th-century brick-built station building. As of (2020) The station is staffed with a working ticket office. The station currently has 8 platforms; however, two are currently out of use. There are waiting rooms on platform one and waiting shelters on 2–6. Access to the platforms is via a subway under the lines. However, the station is not equipped with lifts. The platforms have shelters with seating; however, there are no Dot-matrix display departure and arrival screens or timetable poster boards on the platforms. The station, however, does have a buffet/restaurant on platform 1. There is also Parking in the forecourt.

== Services ==
As of September 2026, the following weekday train services call at this station:

- Hellenic Train Intercity between Athens and Thessaloniki, with up to two trains per day in each direction;
- Thessaloniki Regional Railway Line T1 between Thessaloniki and Larissa, with up to eight trains per day in each direction.

Intercity services are currently limited, due to grade separation works near Sepolia in Athens, and flood mitigation works in Thessaly.

== Gallery ==
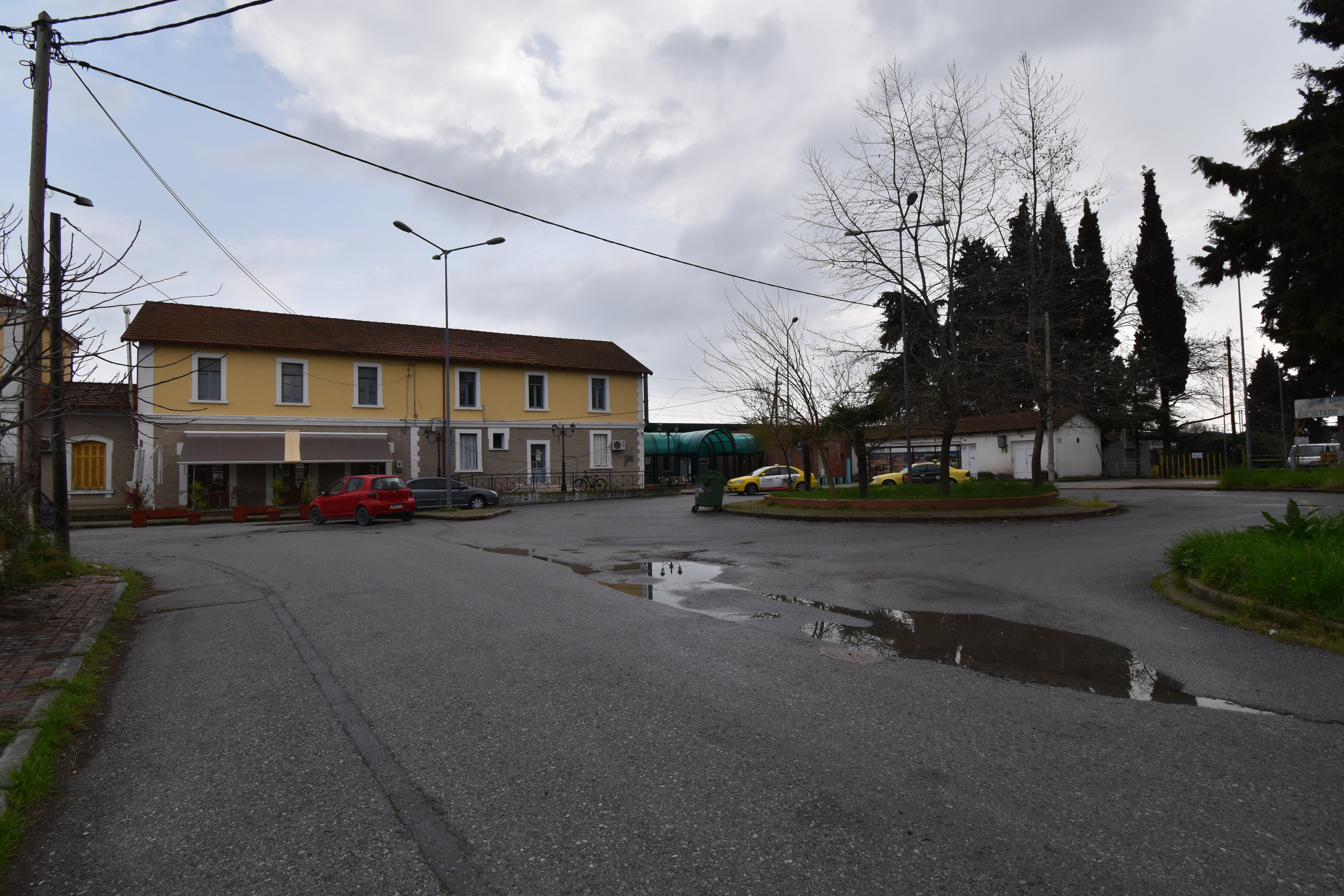
The exterior of the station

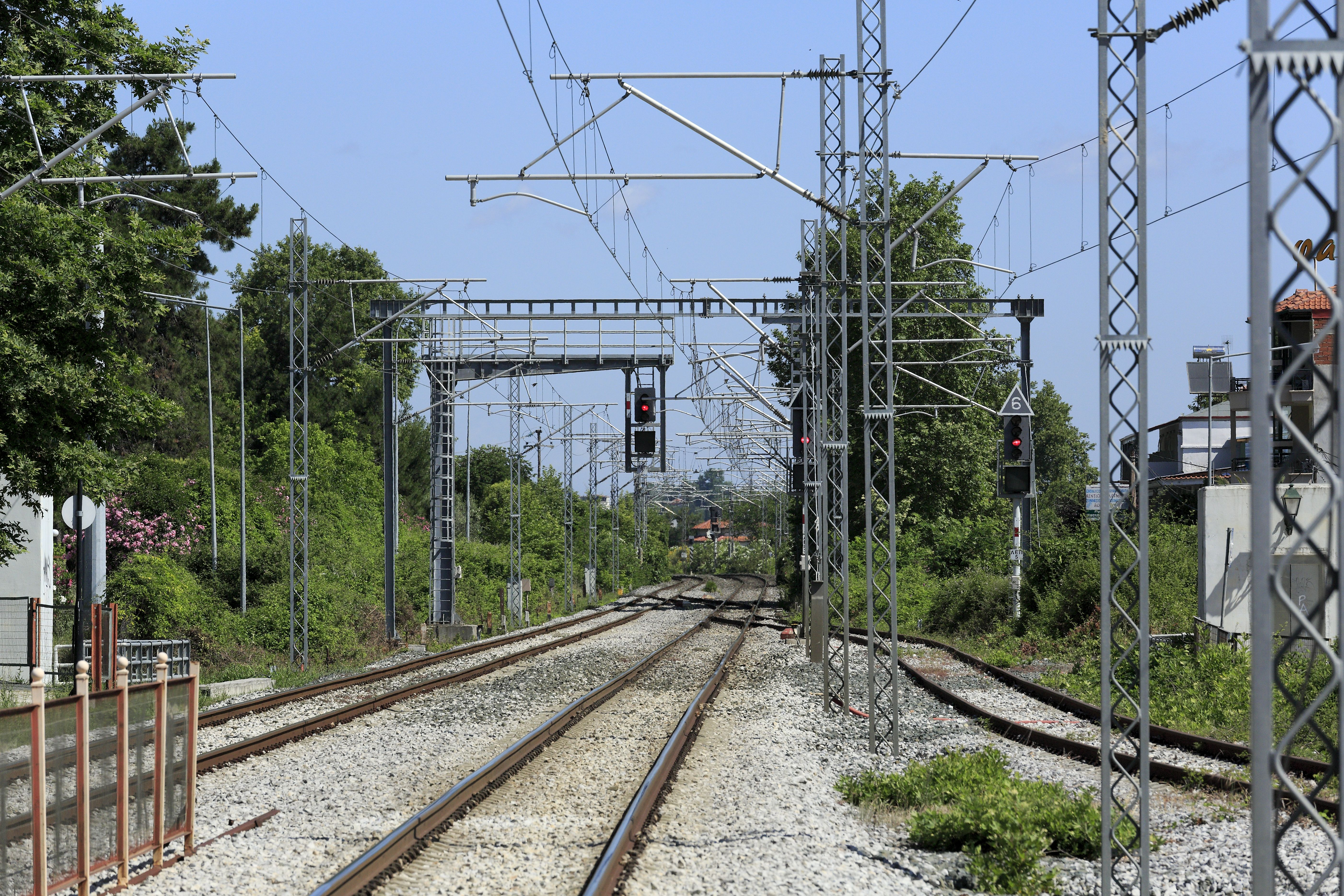
The Station approaches, 2 June 2016

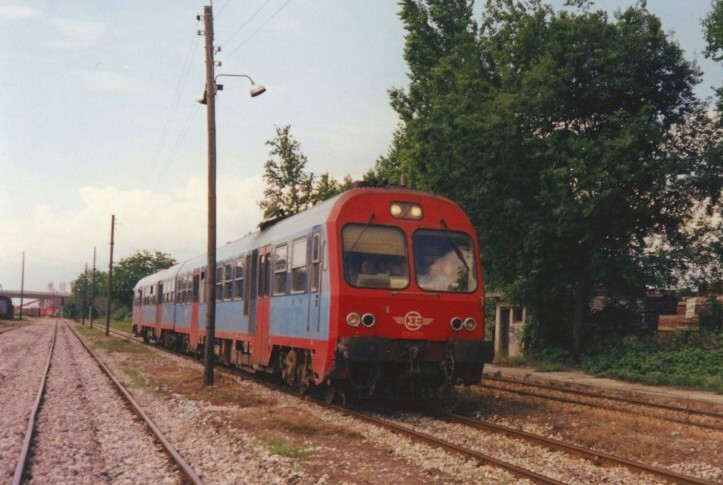
DMU MAN OSE local service 1592 (from Larissa to Thessaloniki) approaching Katerini station, November 2011

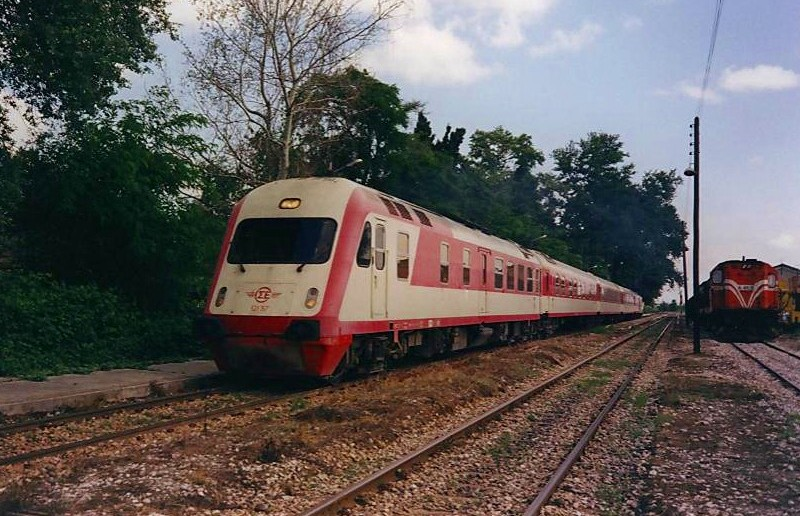
4-car AEG DMU of Greek railways as a 'Regional' train leaving Katerini's station, 17 November 2011

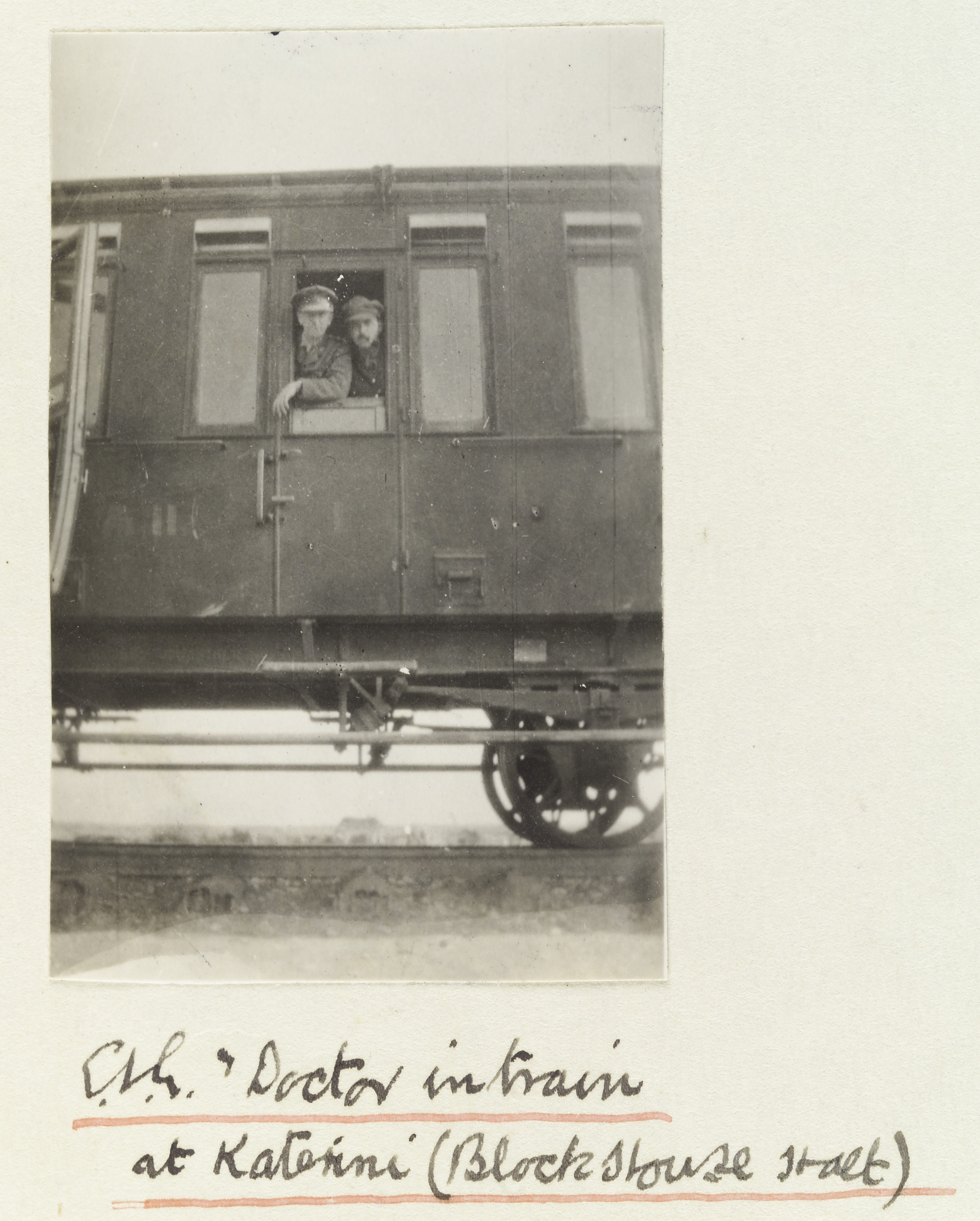
Vintage WWI postcard, photo taken at Katerini Station, the names of the subjects in the photo are only identified as E. L. G. and The Doctor, Date Unknown.

== See also ==
- Railways of Greece
- Greek railway stations
- Greek Railways
- Hellenic Train
- Proastiakos
- P.A.Th.E./P.
