= Mesonisi, Florina =

Mesonisi
- Community
- Location within Greece
- Coordinates: 40°47′34″N 21°27′49″E
- Country: Greece
- Geographic region: Macedonia
- Administrative region: Western Macedonia
- Regional unit: Florina
- Municipality: Florina
- Municipal unit: Florina
- Community: Mesonisi

Population (2021)
  - Community: 166
- Time zone: UTC+2 (EET)
  - Summer (DST): UTC+3 (EEST)

Mesonisi (Greek: Μεσονήσι, before 1926: Λάζενι – Lazeni) is a village in Florina Regional Unit, Macedonia, Greece. It is part of the community of Mesonisi. Nearby the village is Mesonisi railway station.

Lazeni is an old Christian village and a record of its existence is from an Ottoman register (15th century). The village had 500 inhabitants in 1912 and most belonged to the Bulgarian Exarchate with a few families affiliated to the Patriarchate. The village population numbered 200 in 1928.
