= Aiginio railway station =

Railway station in Korinos, Central Macedonia, Greece

Αιγινίου Aiginio

General information
- Location: Aiginio; Pieria; Greece
- Coordinates: 40°29′52″N 22°33′08″E
- Owner: GAIAOSE
- Operator: Hellenic Train
- Line: Piraeus–Platy railway
- Platforms: 4 (2 in regular use)
- Tracks: 4

Construction
- Structure type: at-grade
- Platform levels: 1
- Parking: Yes
- Cycle facilities: No

Other information
- Status: Unstaffed
- Website: http://www.ose.gr/en/

History
- Opened: 9 September 2007
- Electrified: 25 kV AC

Services
Preceding station	Regional Rail	Following station
Korinos towards Larissa	Line T1	Platy towards Thessaloniki
Location
- Location within Greece

Aiginio railway station (Greek: Σιδηροδρομικός σταθμός Αιγινίου, romanized: Sidirodromikos stathmos Aiginio) is a railway station in Korinos, Central Macedonia, Greece. Located in a residential area 1.3 kilometres (0.81 mi) east of the centre of the town, it opened in 2007. It is currently served by the Thessaloniki Regional Railway (formerly the Suburban Railway).

== History ==
The station opened 9 September 2007, replacing an older station of the same name further down the same line. In the early 2000s, the station was included in a broader infrastructure upgrade programme carried out by OSE and funded in part by the European Union. As part of this initiative, Aiginio station was rebuilt in 2007. The modernisation included the reconstruction of platforms to accommodate modern electric trains, the installation of new shelters and ramps for accessibility, and improved track infrastructure to support higher-speed services. Despite this investment, the station remained unstaffed, and its facilities were minimal compared to larger urban stations.

In 2003, OSE had launched "Proastiakos SA", as a subsidiary to serve the operation of the suburban network in the urban complex of Athens during the 2004 Olympic Games. In 2005, TrainOSE was created as a brand within OSE to concentrate on rail services and passenger interface. In 2008, all Proastiakos were transferred from OSE to TrainOSE. By 2014 however, the station buildings were rundown and unused. However, trains still called at the unstaffed halt.

The station is owned by GAIAOSE, which since 3 October 2001 owns most railway stations in Greece: the company was also in charge of rolling stock from December 2014 until October 2025, when Greek Railways (the owner of the Piraeus–Platy railway) took over that responsibility.

== Facilities ==
When the station opened, it was equipped with a purpose-built booking hall and four platforms, with shelters. The platforms were (and still are) connected by subways. However, the station is not equipped with lifts. (As of 2020) The station is unstaffed, with buildings in a poor state of repair. The station is equipped with a small car park in the forecourt, but has limited capacity.

== Services ==
As of September 2026, the following weekday train services call at this station:

- Thessaloniki Regional Railway Line T1 between Thessaloniki and Larissa, with up to eight trains per day in each direction.

The Hellenic Train Intercity service between Athens and Thessaloniki does not call at this station.

== Station layout ==
L Ground/Concourse	Customer service	Tickets/Exits
Level; Ε1	Side platform, doors will open on the right
Level; Ε1	Platform 3	In non-regular use
Level; Ε1	Island platform, doors open on the right/left
Level; Ε1	Platform 1	towards Thessaloniki (Platy) ←
Level; Ε1	Platform 2	towards Athens (Korinos) →
Level; Ε1	Island platform, doors to the left
Level; Ε1	Platform 4	In non-regular use
Level; Ε1	Side platform, doors on the right/left

== See also ==
- Railways of Greece
- Greek railway stations
- Greek Railways
- Hellenic Train
- Proastiakos
- P.A.Th.E./P.
