= Korinos railway station =

Railway station in Korinos, Greece

Κορινός Korinos

General information
- Location: Korinos; Pieria; Greece
- Coordinates: 40°18′58″N 22°34′39″E
- Owner: GAIAOSE
- Operator: Hellenic Train
- Line: Piraeus–Platy railway Korinos-Methoni-Aigini railway
- Platforms: 2
- Tracks: 2

Construction
- Structure type: at-grade
- Platform levels: 1
- Parking: Yes

Other information
- Status: Unstaffed
- Website: http://www.ose.gr/en/

History
- Rebuilt: 9 September 2007
- Electrified: 25 kV AC

Services
Preceding station	Regional Rail	Following station
Katerini towards Larissa	Line T1	Aiginio towards Thessaloniki
Location
- Location within Greece

Korinos railway station (Greek: Σιδηροδρομικός σταθμός Κορινού, romanized: Sidirodromikos stathmos Korinos) is a railway station in Korinos, Central Macedonia, Greece. Located in the centre of the village, it opened on 9 September 2007. It is served by the Thessaloniki Regional Railway (formerly the Suburban Railway).

== History ==
The station opened on 9 September 2007 on a stretch of the former Korinos-Methoni-Aigini line, which terminated close to the station. In May 2020, due in part to both vandalism and poor maintenance, Georgios Stylos, Head of building infrastructure of OSE was called to meet Korinos's Mayor Costas Grammatikopoulos.

The station is owned by GAIAOSE, which since 3 October 2001 owns most railway stations in Greece: the company was also in charge of rolling stock from December 2014 until October 2025, when Greek Railways (the owner of the Piraeus–Platy railway) took over that responsibility.

== Facilities ==
The station is unstaffed. The platforms are connected by subways. However, the station is not equipped with lifts. The station is equipped with onsite parking. There is a Petrol station next to the station, with a small shop.

== Services ==
As of September 2026, the following weekday train services call at this station:

- Thessaloniki Regional Railway Line T1 between Thessaloniki and Larissa, with up to eight trains per day in each direction.

The Hellenic Train Intercity service between Athens and Thessaloniki does not call at this station.

== Station layout ==
L Ground/Concourse	Customer service	Tickets/Exits
Level; L1	Side platform, doors will open on the right
Level; L1	Platform 1	← to Thessaloniki (Aiginio)
Level; L1	Platform 2	to Larissa (Katerini) →
Level; L1	Side platform, doors will open on the right
