= Litochoro railway station =

Railway station in Litochoro, Central Macedonia, Greece

Λιτόχωρο Litochoro
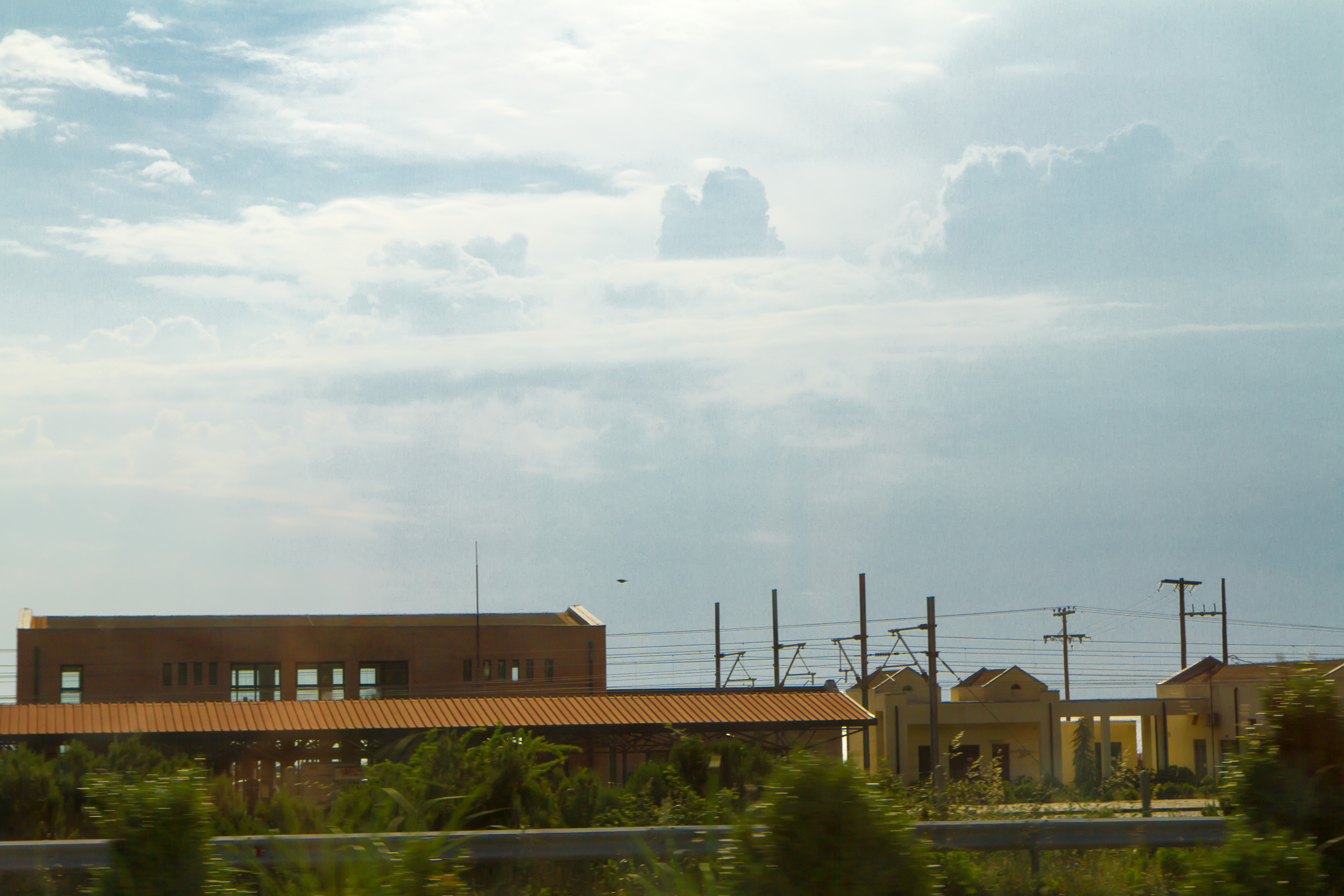
- Litochoro railway station from the roadside, 2014

General information
- Location: Leptokarya; Pieria; Greece
- Coordinates: 40.1251545°N 22.5501412°E
- Owner: GAIAOSE
- Operator: Hellenic Train
- Line: Piraeus–Platy railway
- Platforms: 4 (2 in regular use)
- Tracks: 4

Construction
- Structure type: at-grade
- Platform levels: 1
- Parking: Yes

Other information
- Status: Unstaffed (before 2025)

History
- Opened: 1916
- Closed: 2006?
- Rebuilt: 9 September 2007
- Electrified: 25 kV 50 Hz AC

Services
Preceding station	Regional Rail	Following station
Leptokarya towards Larissa	Line T1	Katerini towards Thessaloniki
Location
- Location within Greece

Litochoro railway station (Greek: Σιδηροδρομικός σταθμός Λιτοχώρου, romanized: Sidirodromikos stathmos Litochoro) is a railway station in Litohoro, a town in Pieria, Central Macedonia, Greece. The station currently has four platforms, however only are two are currently in regular use. The station is located across the A1 motorway road from the residential area, close to the town centre, and sits around 130m from the shoreline. The stations is also one of the closest active station to Mount Olympus National Monument, and sits in the showdown of the ancient landmark.

== History ==
The station was built in 1916. It was relocated 3.8 kilometres (2.4 mi) south and a new station with the same name opened on 9 September 2007 at a cost of €1.4 million on new SGYT section of line from Leptokarya to Katerini. The original station and the section of line it sat on has since been abandoned. Further upgrades to the line to allow Proastiakos services to access the line followed. It was the terminal of the line from its opening until 7 September 2008, when the line was extended to Larissa. The station has suffered from poor maintenance and Repeat vandalism.

In May 2025, the Macedonia-Thrace Branch of the Panhellenic Association of Paraplegics addressed the competent ministers and other stakeholders, requesting that Litochoro railway station finally acquire the minimum infrastructure and that the existing infrastructure of Leptokarya station be maintained.

The station is owned by GAIAOSE, which since 3 October 2001 owns most railway stations in Greece: the company was also in charge of rolling stock from December 2014 until October 2025, when Greek Railways (the owner of the Piraeus–Platy railway) took over that responsibility.

== Facilities ==
The station is staffed with a working ticket office (as of 2019). The station currently has four platforms; however, only two are currently in regular use. There are waiting rooms on platform one and waiting shelters on 2-4. Access to the platforms is via a subway under the lines, however, the station is not equipped with lifts. The platforms have shelters with seating; however, there are no Dot-matrix display departure and arrival screens or timetable poster boards on the platforms. The station, however, does have a buffet. There is also Parking in the forecourt.

== Services ==
As of September 2026, the following weekday train services call at this station:

- Thessaloniki Regional Railway Line T1 between Thessaloniki and Larissa, with up to eight trains per day in each direction.

The Hellenic Train Intercity service between Athens and Thessaloniki does not call at this station.

== Station Layout ==
L Ground/Concourse	Customer service	Tickets/Exits
Level; L1	Side platform, doors will open on the right
Level; L1	Platform 3	non-regular use
Level; L1	Island platform, doors will open on the right
Level; L1	Platform 1	towards Thessaloniki (Katerini) ←
Level; L1	Platform 2	towards Larissa (Leptokarya) →
Level; L1	Island platform, doors on the right/left
Platform 4	non-regular use

== Gallery ==
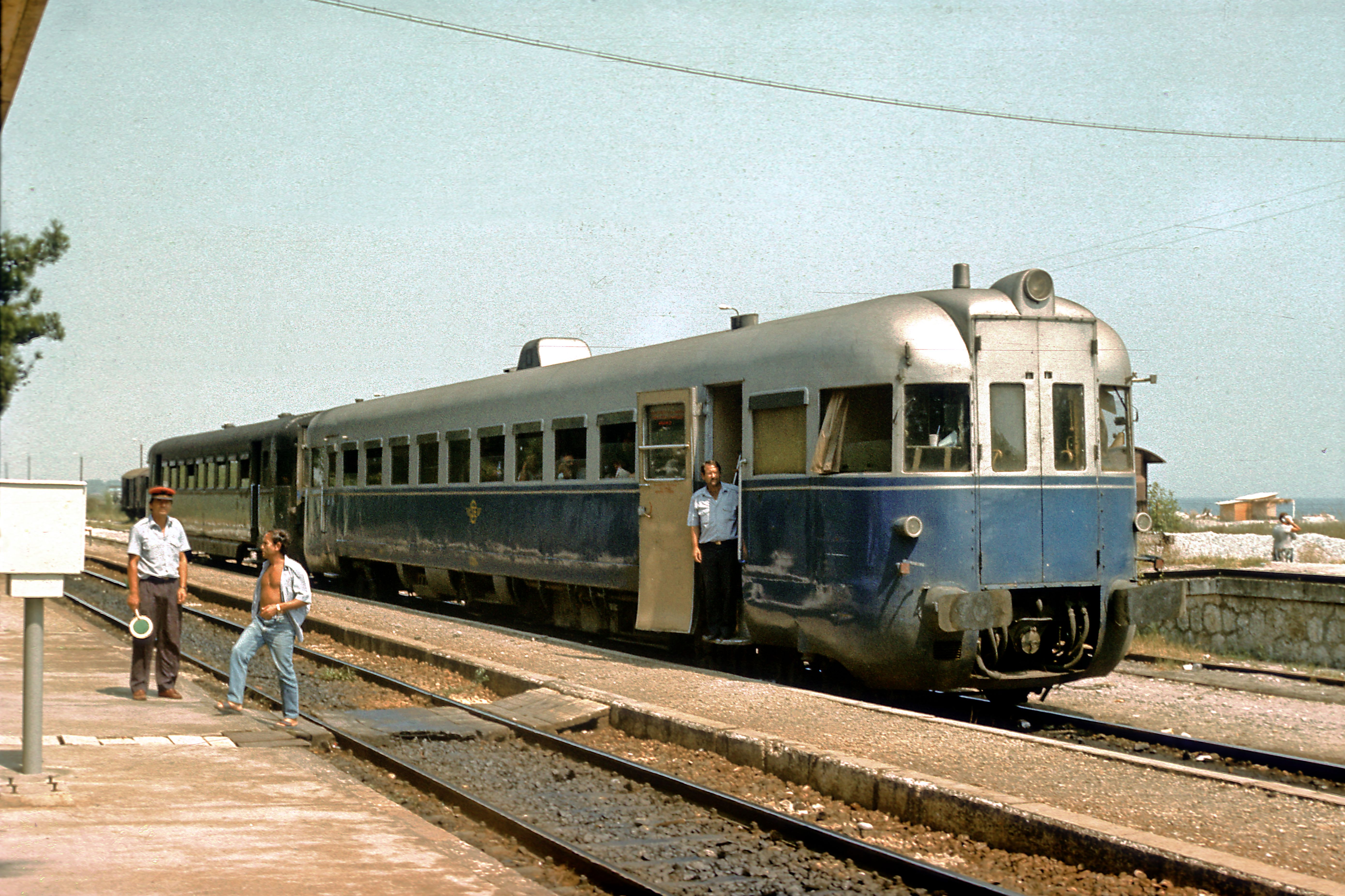
Leptokarya Old station, 11 August 1990

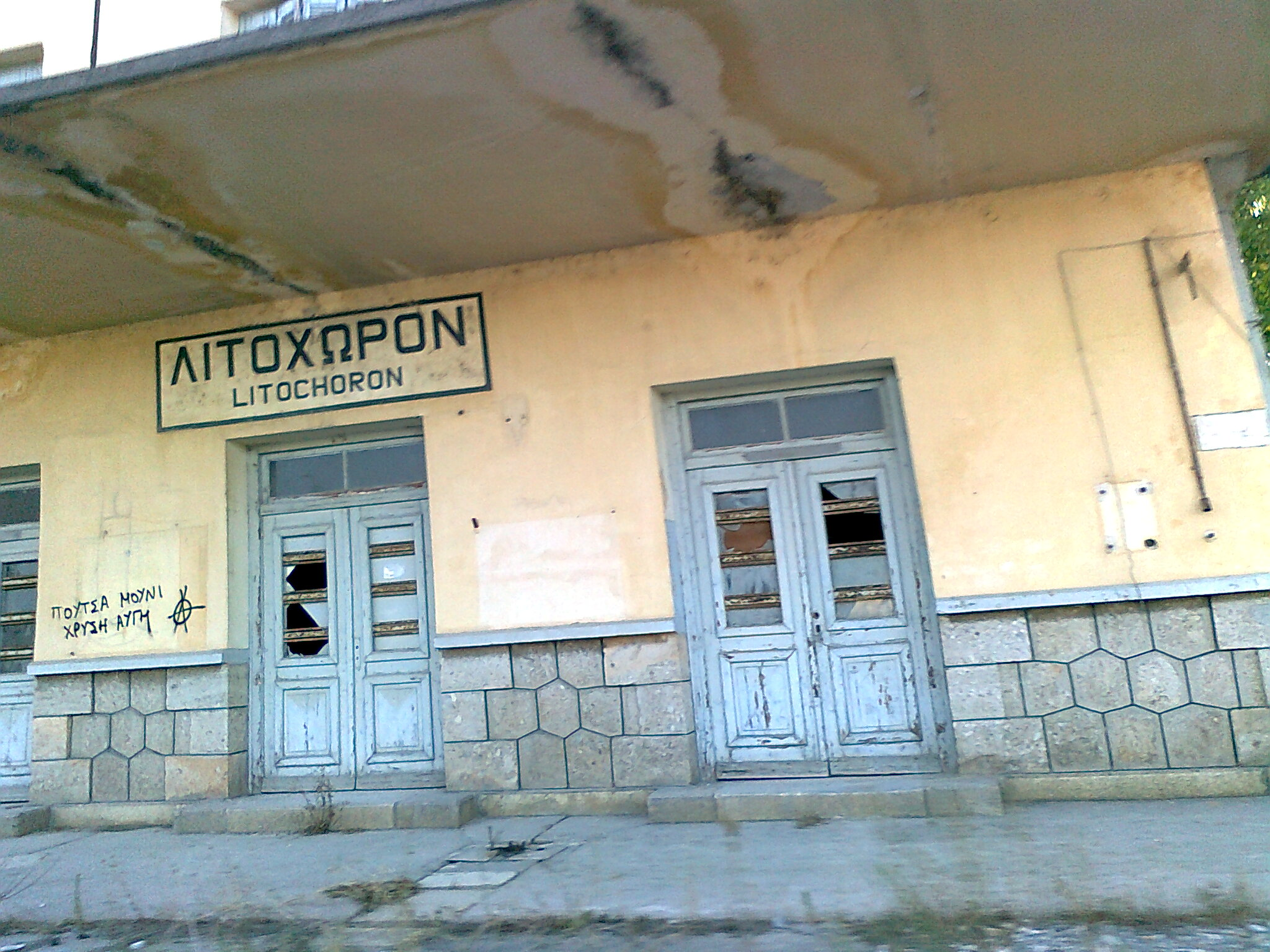
The old station building, 22 August 2010
