= Leptokarya railway station =

Railway station in Greece

Λεπτοκαρυά Leptokarya
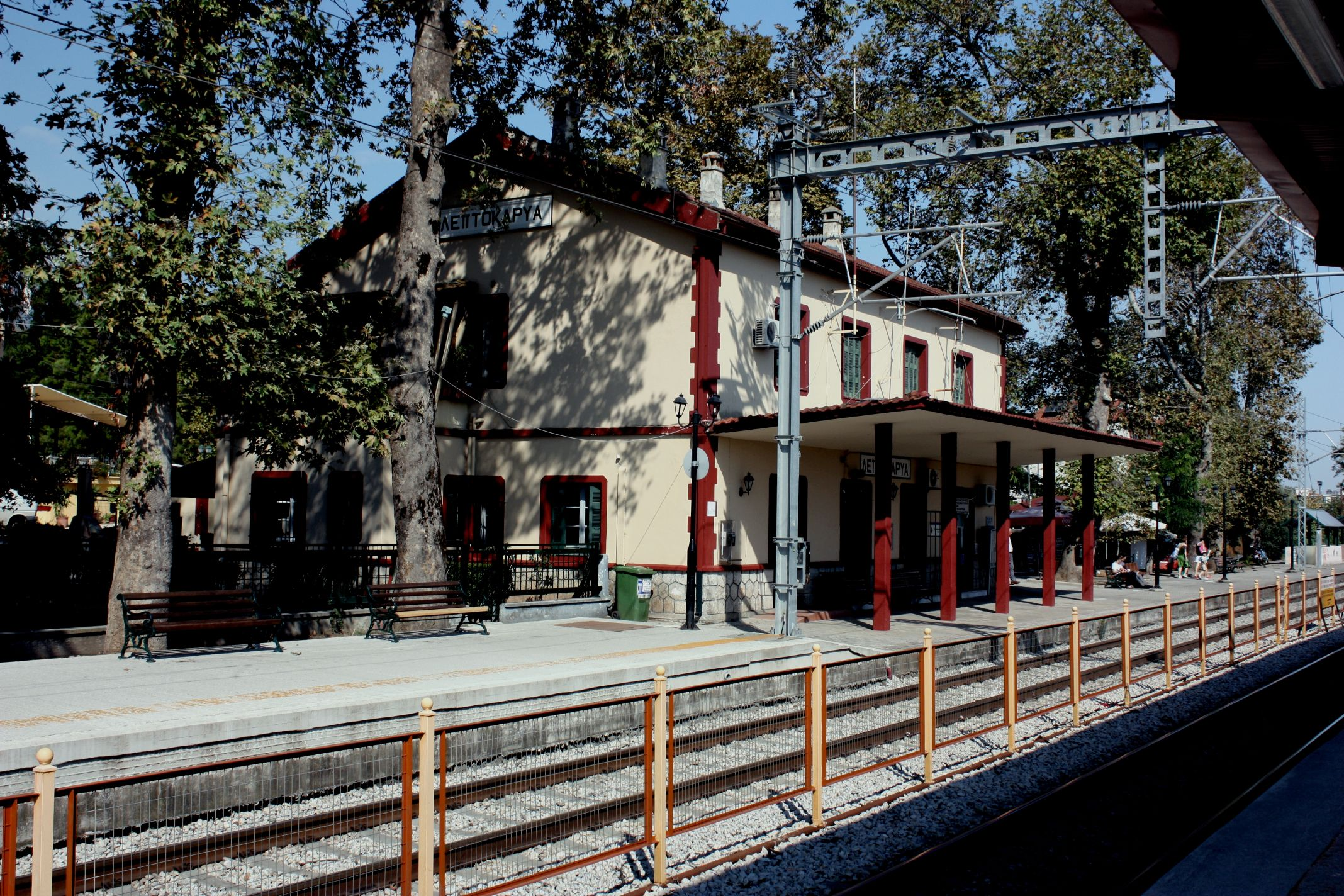
- Leptokaria Station, with Platform 2 in the background, 2010

General information
- Location: 60063 Leptokarya; Pieria; Greece
- Coordinates: 40.0588°N 22.5656°E
- Owner: GAIAOSE
- Operator: Hellenic Train
- Line: Piraeus–Platy railway
- Platforms: 3 (2 in regular use)
- Tracks: 3

Construction
- Structure type: at-grade

Other information
- Website: http://www.ose.gr/en/

History
- Opened: 1916
- Rebuilt: 7 September 2008; 18 years ago
- Electrified: 25 kV AC

Services
| Preceding station | Regional Rail | Following station |
|---|---|---|
| Neoi Poroi towards Larissa | Line T1 | Litochoro towards Thessaloniki |
Location
- Location within Greece

Leptokarya railway station (Greek: Σιδηροδρομικός σταθμός Λεπτοκαρυάς, romanized: Sidirodromikos stathmos Leptokaryá) is a railway station in Leptokarya, a town in Pieria, Central Macedonia, Greece. The station is located in a residential area, close to the town centre, and is also the closest active station to Mount Olympus National Monument, and sits in the shadow of the ancient landmark.

== History ==
The station was built in 1916. In 1970 OSE became the legal successor to the SEK, taking over responsibilities for most of Greece's rail infrastructure. On 1 January 1971, the station and most of the Greek rail infrastructure was transferred to the Hellenic Railways Organisation S.A., a state-owned corporation. Freight traffic declined sharply when the state-imposed monopoly of OSE for the transport of agricultural products and fertilisers ended in the early 1990s. Many small stations of the network with little passenger traffic were closed down. In 2001 the infrastructure element of OSE was created, known as GAIAOSE; it would henceforth be responsible for the maintenance of stations, bridges and other elements of the network, as well as the leasing and the sale of railway assists. In 2003, OSE launched "Proastiakos SA", as a subsidiary to serve the operation of the suburban network in the urban complex of Athens during the 2004 Olympic Games. In 2004 the station and the line closed as part of the upgrades to the Piraeus–Platy railway. In 2005, TrainOSE was created as a brand within OSE to concentrate on rail services and passenger interface. In 2008, all Proastiakos were transferred from OSE to TrainOSE.

The station reopened on 7 September 2008 as part of the rollout of Proastiakos services. Since 2008, the station is served by the Proastiakos Thessaloniki services to New Railway Station. In 2009, with the Greek debt crisis unfolding OSE's Management was forced to reduce services across the network. Timetables were cut back, and routes closed as the government-run entity attempted to reduce overheads. In 2017 OSE's passenger transport sector was privatised as TrainOSE, currently a wholly owned subsidiary of Ferrovie dello Stato Italiane infrastructure, including stations, remained under the control of OSE.

The station is owned by GAIAOSE, which since 3 October 2001 owns most railway stations in Greece: the company was also in charge of rolling stock from December 2014 until October 2025, when Greek Railways (the owner of the Piraeus–Platy railway) took over that responsibility.

== Facilities ==
The station is still housed in the original early 20th-century brick-built station building. As of (2020) The station is staffed, with a working ticket office. The station currently has three platforms; however, only two are currently in regular use. There are waiting rooms on platform one and waiting shelters on 2/3. Access to the platforms is via a subway under the lines. The platforms have shelters with seating; however, there are no Dot-matrix display departure and arrival screens or timetable poster boards on the platforms. The station, however, does have a buffet. There is also Parking in the forecourt.

== Services ==
As of September 2026, the following weekday train services call at this station:

- Thessaloniki Regional Railway Line T1 between Thessaloniki and Larissa, with up to eight trains per day in each direction.

The Hellenic Train Intercity service between Athens and Thessaloniki does not call at this station.

== Station Layout ==
| L Ground/Concourse | Customer service | Tickets/Exits |
| Level; L1 | Side platform, doors will open on the right |
| Level; L1 | Platform 3 | non-regular use |
| Level; L1 | Island platform, doors will open on the right |
| Level; L1 | Platform 1 | towards Thessaloniki (Litochoro) ← |
| Level; L1 | Platform 2 | towards Larissa (Neoi Poroi) → |
| Level; L1 | Side platform, doors will open on the right |

== Gallery ==
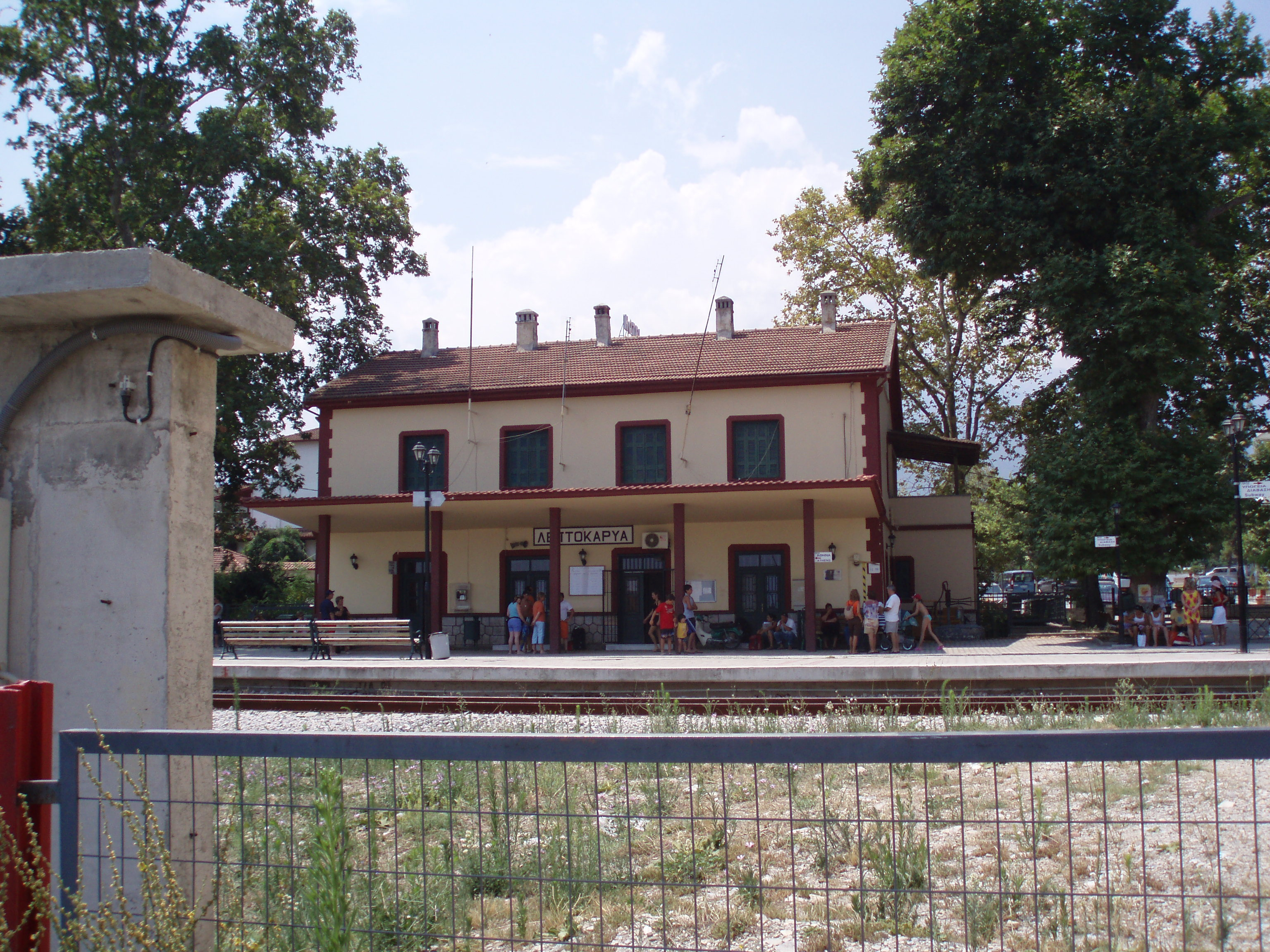
Leptokarya station building, 26 July 2006

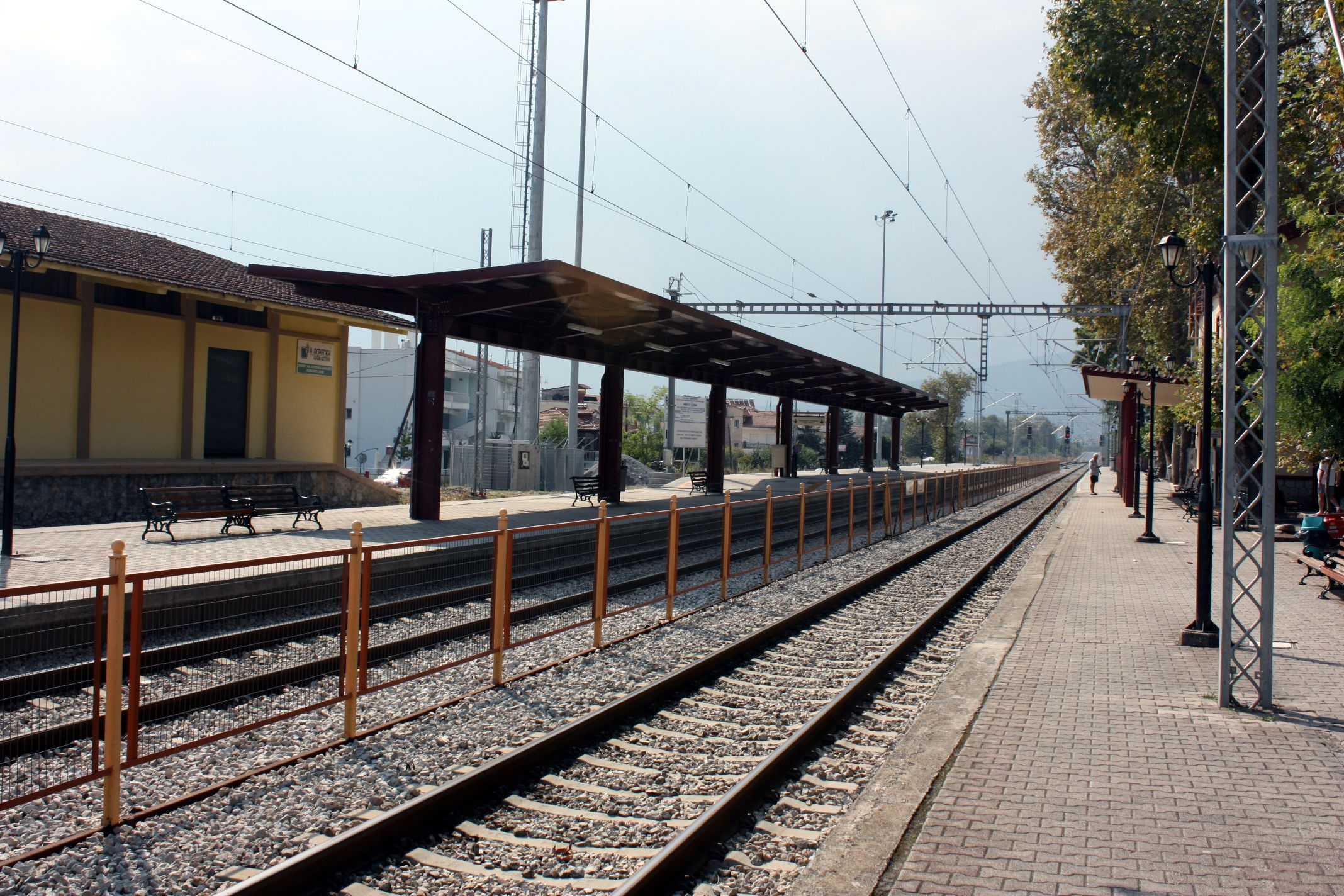
Platform 1, 17 November 2010

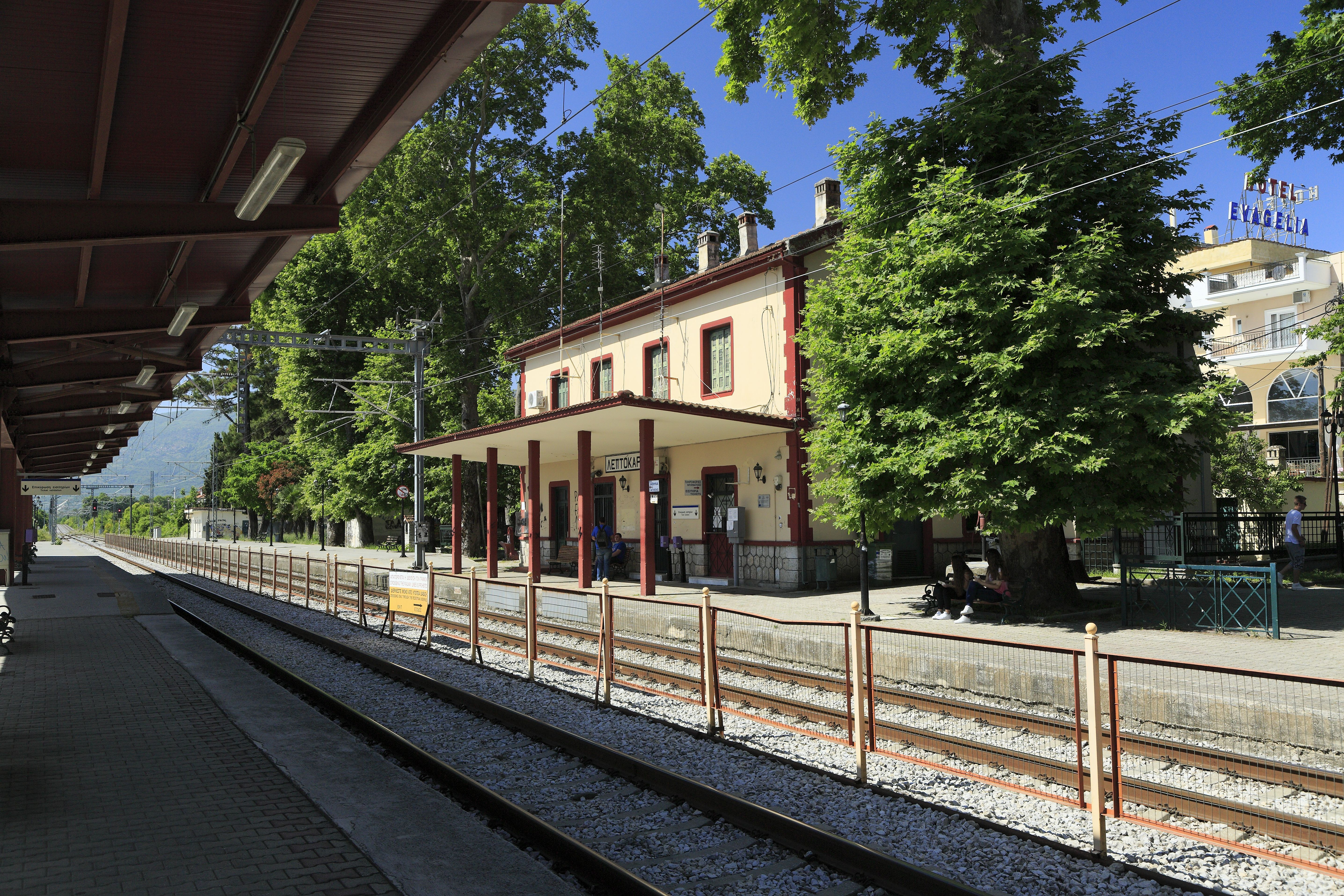
Platform 2, 2 June 2016

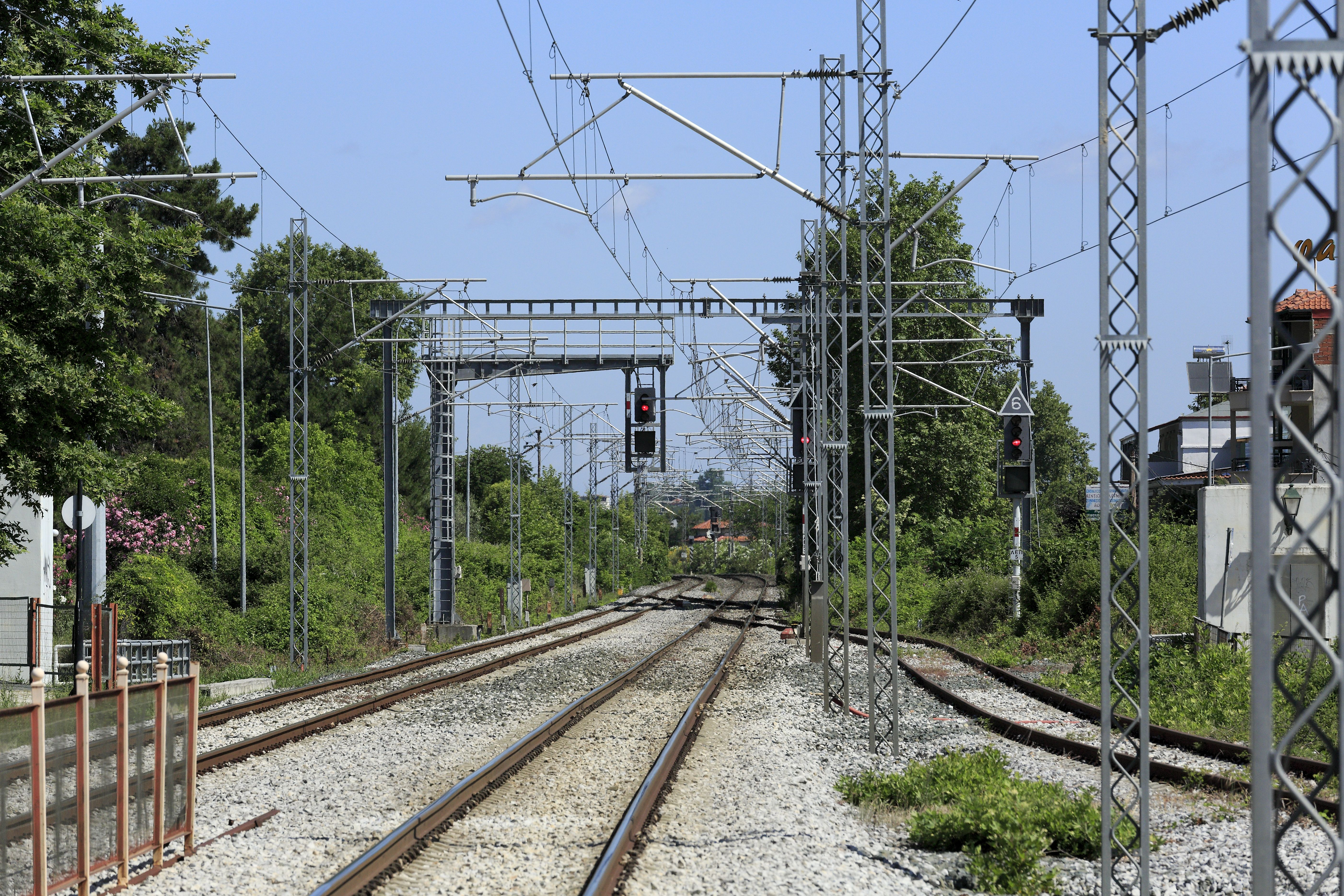
The Southern Approaches, 2 June 2016

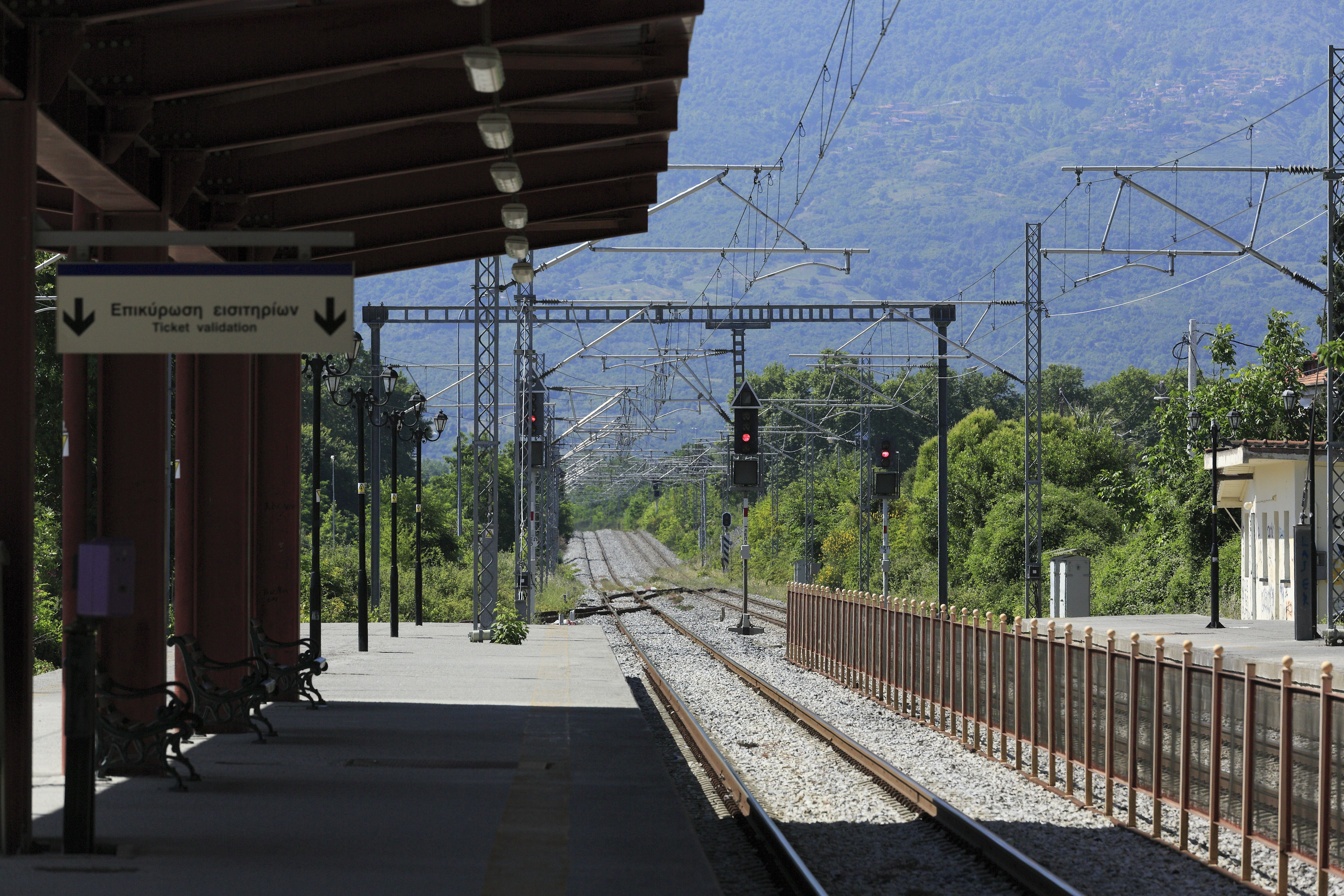
Leptokarya station, 2 June 2016

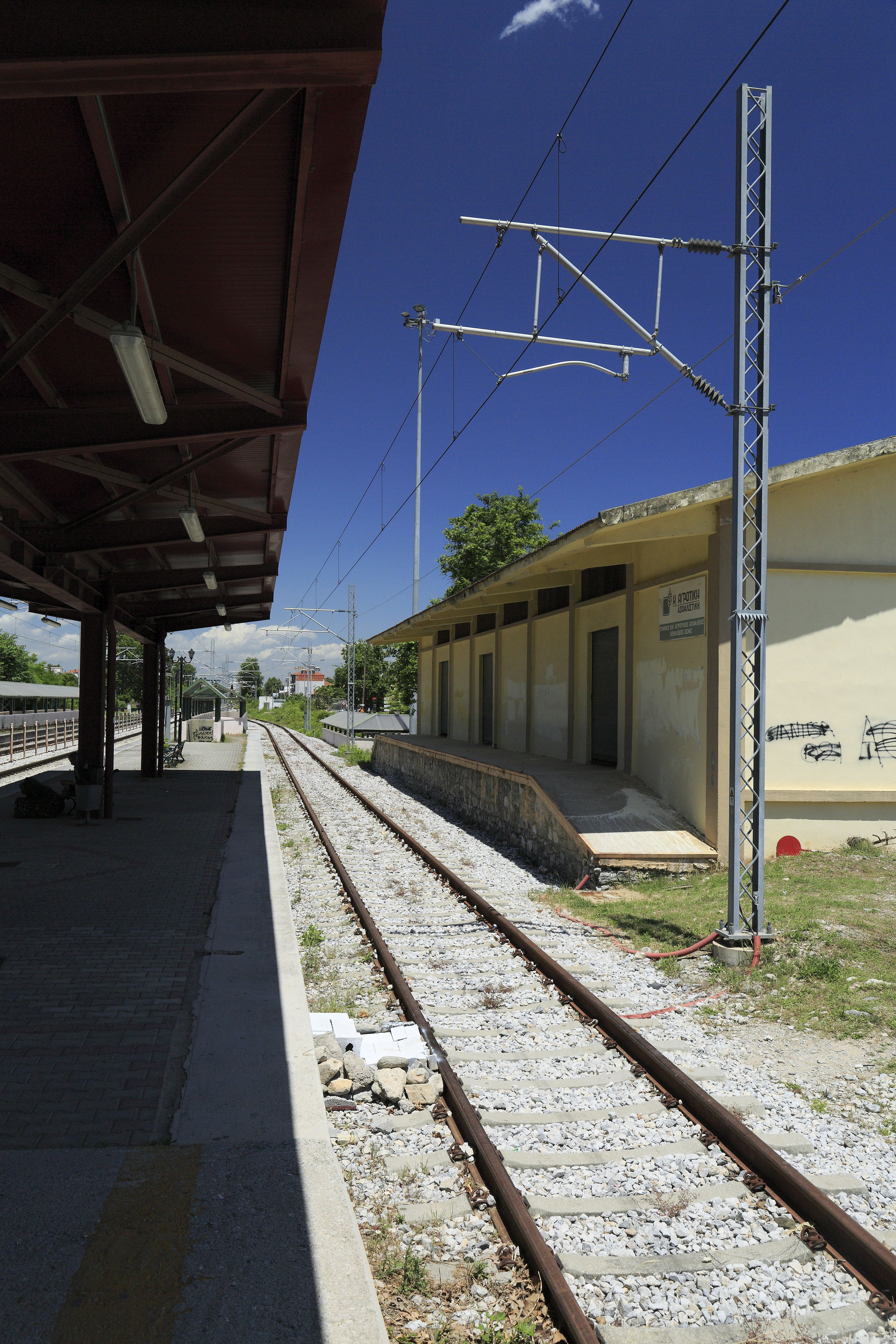
The little used Platform 3, 2 June 2016

== See also ==
- Railway stations in Greece
- Hellenic Railways Organization
- Hellenic Train
- Proastiakos
