= Platy railway station =

Railway station in Greece

Πλατύ Platy
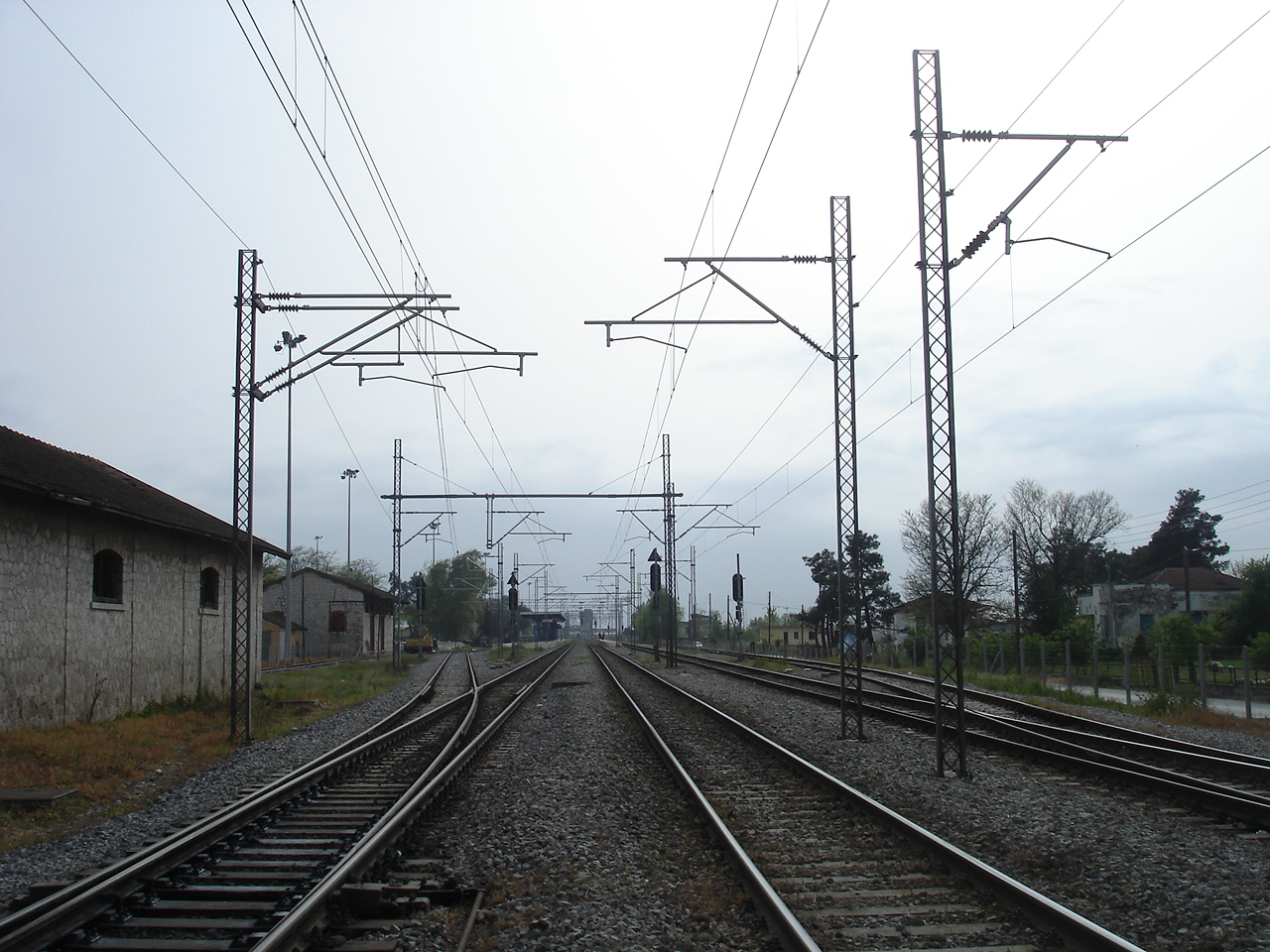
- Approaches to Platy railway station, April 2008

General information
- Location: Alexandria 590 32, Platy; Imathia; Greece
- Coordinates: 40°38′11″N 22°31′47″E
- Owner: GAIAOSE
- Operator: Hellenic Train
- Lines: Piraeus–Platy railway; Thessaloniki–Bitola railway
- Platforms: 4 (1 disused)
- Tracks: 6

Construction
- Structure type: at-grade
- Platform levels: 1
- Parking: Yes

Other information
- Status: Staffed
- Website: http://www.ose.gr/en/

History
- Opened: 1894
- Electrified: 25 kV 50 Hz AC

Services
| Preceding station | Hellenic Train | Following station |
|---|---|---|
| Katerini towards Athens | C1 Athens-Thessaloniki | Thessaloniki Terminus |
| Preceding station | Regional Rail | Following station |
| Aiginio towards Larissa | Line T1 | Adendro towards Thessaloniki |
| Alexandreia towards Florina | Line T2 | Adendro towards Thessaloniki |
Location
- Location within Greece

Platy railway station (Greek: Σιδηροδρομικός σταθμός Πλατέος, romanized: Sidirodromikós stathmós Platéos) is the railway station of Platy in Imathia, Central Macedonia, Greece. Opened in 1894 in what was then the Ottoman Empire, it is located southwest of the residential area, at the junction of the Piraeus–Platy railway and Thessaloniki–Bitola railway 1.3 kilometres (0.81 mi) southwest of the town centre. The station is served by Intercity trains between Athens and Thessaloniki and since 9 September 2007 by the Thessaloniki Regional Railway (formerly the Suburban Railway).

== History ==
Opened in 1894 in what was then the Ottoman Empire, at the completion of the Société du Chemin de Fer ottoman Salonique-Monastir, a branchline of the Chemins de fer Orientaux from Thessaloniki to Bitola. During this period Northern Greece and the southern Balkans were still under Ottoman rule, and Adendro was known as Kirtzilar. Adendro was annexed by Greece on 18 October 1912 during the First Balkan War. On 17 October 1925, The Greek government purchased the Greek sections of the former Salonica Monastir railway, and the railway became part of the Hellenic State Railways, with the remaining section north of Florina seeded to Yugoslavia. In 1970 OSE became the legal successor to the SEK, taking over responsibilities for most of Greece's rail infrastructure. On 1 January 1971, the station and most of the Greek rail infrastructure were transferred to the Hellenic Railways Organisation S.A., a state-owned corporation. Freight traffic declined sharply when the state-imposed monopoly of OSE for the transport of agricultural products and fertilisers ended in the early 1990s. Many small stations of the network with little passenger traffic were closed down. In 2001 the infrastructure element of OSE was created, known as GAIAOSE; it would henceforth be responsible for the maintenance of stations, bridges and other elements of the network, as well as the leasing and the sale of railway assists. In 2003, OSE launched "Proastiakos SA", as a subsidiary to serve the operation of the suburban network in the urban complex of Athens during the 2004 Olympic Games. In 2005, TrainOSE was created as a brand within OSE to concentrate on rail services and passenger interface.

On 9 September 2007, the station reopened for the Thessaloniki Regional Railway. In 2008, all Proastiakos were transferred from OSE to TrainOSE. In 2009, with the Greek debt crisis unfolding OSE's Management was forced to reduce services across the network. Timetables were cut back, and routes closed as the government-run entity attempted to reduce overheads. In 2017 OSE's passenger transport sector was privatised as TrainOSE, currently, a wholly owned subsidiary of Ferrovie dello Stato Italiane infrastructure, including stations, remained under the control of OSE.

The station is owned by GAIAOSE, which since 3 October 2001 owns most railway stations in Greece: the company was also in charge of rolling stock from December 2014 until October 2025, when Greek Railways (the owner of the Piraeus–Platy and Thessaloniki–Bitola railways) took over that responsibility.

== Facilities ==
The station has waiting rooms and a staffed ticket office within the original 19th-century building. As of (2020) The station is staffed with a working ticket office. The station currently has four platforms; however, only three are currently in regular use. There are waiting rooms on platform one and waiting shelters on 2/3. Access to the platforms is via a subway under the lines. The platforms have shelters with seating; however, there are no Dot-matrix display departure and arrival screens or timetable poster boards on the platforms. The station, however, does have a buffet. There is also Parking in the forecourt.

== Services ==
As of September 2026, the following weekday train services call at this station:

- Hellenic Train Intercity between Athens and Thessaloniki, with up to two trains per day in each direction;
- Thessaloniki Regional Railway Line T1 between Thessaloniki and Larissa, with up to eight trains per day in each direction;
- Thessaloniki Regional Railway Line T2, with three trains per day in each direction towards Thessaloniki, two towards Florina, and one towards Edessa.

Intercity services are currently limited, due to grade separation works near Sepolia in Athens, and flood mitigation works in Thessaly.

== Station layout ==
Level E1
Through line
Not in regular use
Platform 3
← to Florina (Lianovergion)
Island platform, doors open on the left/right
Platform 2
← to Larissa (Aiginio) / to Athens (Katerini)
Platform 1
to Thessaloniki (Adendro) →
to Thessaloniki (terminus) →
Side platform, doors open on the right
Platform 4
Not in regular use
Side platform, doors open on the right
G
- Street level
- Concourse
- Customer service
- Tickets
- Exits

== See also ==
- Railways of Greece
- Greek railway stations
- Greek Railways
- Hellenic Train
- Proastiakos
- P.A.Th.E./P.
