= Mesonisi railway station =

Railway station in Central Macedonia, Greece

Μεσονησίου Mesonisi

General information
- Location: Florina 531 00; Macedonia; Greece
- Coordinates: 40.7973175°N 21.4734210°E
- Owner: GAIAOSE
- Operator: Hellenic Train
- Line: Thessaloniki–Bitola railway Messonisi-Florina railway
- Platforms: 2 (1 side platform, 1 island platform)
- Tracks: 4

Construction
- Structure type: at-grade
- Platform levels: 1
- Parking: Yes

Other information
- Status: Unstaffed
- Website: Hellenic Railways Organisation

History
- Opened: 1894
- Former names: Florina (until 1931)
- Original company: Société du Chemin de Fer ottoman Salonique-Monastir

Services
Preceding station	Regional Rail	Following station
Florina Terminus	Line T2	Sitaria towards Thessaloniki

Former service
Preceding station	Hellenic Train	Following station
Terminus	I1 Thessaloniki-Bitola (defunct)	Neos Kafkasos towards Bitola
Location
- Location within Greece

Mesonisi railway station (Greek: Σιδηροδρομικός σταθμός Μεσονησίου, romanized: Sidirodromikós stathmós Mesonisi) is a railway station near Mesonisi, a village in Western Macedonia, Greece. It is situated on the Thessaloniki–Bitola railway. It was opened in 1894, along with the line. The station is served (since 9 September 2007) by the Thessaloniki Regional Railway (formerly the Suburban Railway).

== History ==
The station opened in 1894 as Florina in the then Salonica Province, along with the line in what was then the Ottoman Empire, by the Société du Chemin de Fer ottoman Salonique-Monastir, a branchline of the Chemins de fer Orientaux, one of the five pioneer railway companies in the Ottoman territory (1870-1937). During this period, Northern Greece and the southern Balkans were still under Ottoman rule. The line was designed to connect the two existing railway junctions at Thessaloniki and Skopje. Thessaloniki was already connected to Skopje by 1871. After seventeen years, the Serbian network was connected to the Turkish Axios railway: Thermaikos gulf was connected to the Danube, and Thessaloniki was connected to Vienna and Paris. In 1893, the line from Thessaloniki extended to western Macedonia and as far as Florina. The following year, the railway arrived in Mesonisi (1894).

The first railway station built in Mesonisi was now a "terminal" station for the empire's north. Called "Florina" station (the current station of Mesonissi was where Florina's passengers disembarked from). Upon completion, the line operations were given to the Chemins de fer Orientaux, which were already operating the Salonique to Mitrovica and Vranje railways. Whether Baron Maurice de Hirsch took an active role in this railway is debatable, considering he retired from the Balkan railway building shortly before this project began. While at that time, the practice of compulsory work was still in use, labour was cheap in rural Macedonia, and the engineers were reported to be enthusiastically welcomed.

In 1896 the Salonica Monastir line was constructed to allow trains from Bitola to continue onwards to Thessaloniki without the need to reverse north of Mesonisi. Mesonisi was annexed by Greece on 18 October 1912 during the First Balkan War. On 17 October 1925, The Greek government purchased the Greek sections of the former Salonica Monastir railway, and the railway became part of the Hellenic State Railways, with the remaining section north of Florina seeded to Yugoslavia.

In the early 1920s, effects were made to extend the line to Florina, now cut off from the greek railway network. The works involved the creation of a curve of track just of the existing station and a small section of single track. Work began in July 1924, and with Law 3274/1924 the construction of a branch line to the town of Florina. Construction took around three years due in part to delays and funding issues, which had grown to 10 million drachmas (double the original estimate).

In 1929, the construction works of the line were completed, and the first trains arrived at the new temporary station in the city of Florina. The construction work on new permanent station buildings began immediately and was completed in 1931. On 15 May 1931, the station was inaugurated. The Municipal Council, at the meeting on 6-7-1931 (dec. no. 139), decides that "after the construction and operation of the new Florini Railway Station, as in the case of the old Florini Railway Station, the name Armenochorio Railway Station should be given to the new Florini Railway Station. In 1931 'Old' Florina station was renamed Mesonisi.

In 1970 OSE became the legal successor to the SEK, taking over responsibilities for most of Greece's rail infrastructure. On 1 January 1971, the station and most of the Greek rail infrastructure were transferred to the Hellenic Railways Organisation S.A., a state-owned corporation. Freight traffic declined sharply when the state-imposed monopoly of OSE for the transport of agricultural products and fertilisers ended in the early 1990s. Many small stations of the network with little passenger traffic were closed down. In 2001 the infrastructure element of OSE was created, known as GAIAOSE; it would henceforth be responsible for the maintenance of stations, bridges and other elements of the network, as well as the leasing and the sale of railway assists. In 2005, TrainOSE was created as a brand within OSE to concentrate on rail services and passenger interface.

In 2009, with the Greek debt crisis unfolding OSE's Management was forced to reduce services across the network. Timetables were cut back, and routes closed as the government-run entity attempted to reduce overheads. In 2017 OSE's passenger transport sector was privatised as TrainOSE, currently a wholly owned subsidiary of Ferrovie dello Stato Italiane infrastructure, including stations, remained under the control of OSE. In July 2022, the station began being served by Hellenic Train, the rebranded TranOSE

The station is owned by GAIAOSE, which since 3 October 2001 owns most railway stations in Greece: the company was also in charge of rolling stock from December 2014 until October 2025, when Greek Railways (the owner of the Thessaloniki–Bitola railway) took over that responsibility.

== Facilities ==
The station is unstaffed, with the station building in a dilapidated state of repair.

== Services ==
As of September 2026, Line T2 of the Thessaloniki Regional Railway calls at this station: service is currently limited compared to October 2012, with two trains per day to Thessaloniki, and two trains per day to Florina.

There are currently no services to Bitola in North Macedonia, because the international connection from Mesonisi to Neos Kafkasos is currently disused.
