= Diakopto railway station =

Railway station in Greece

Διακοπτό Diakopto
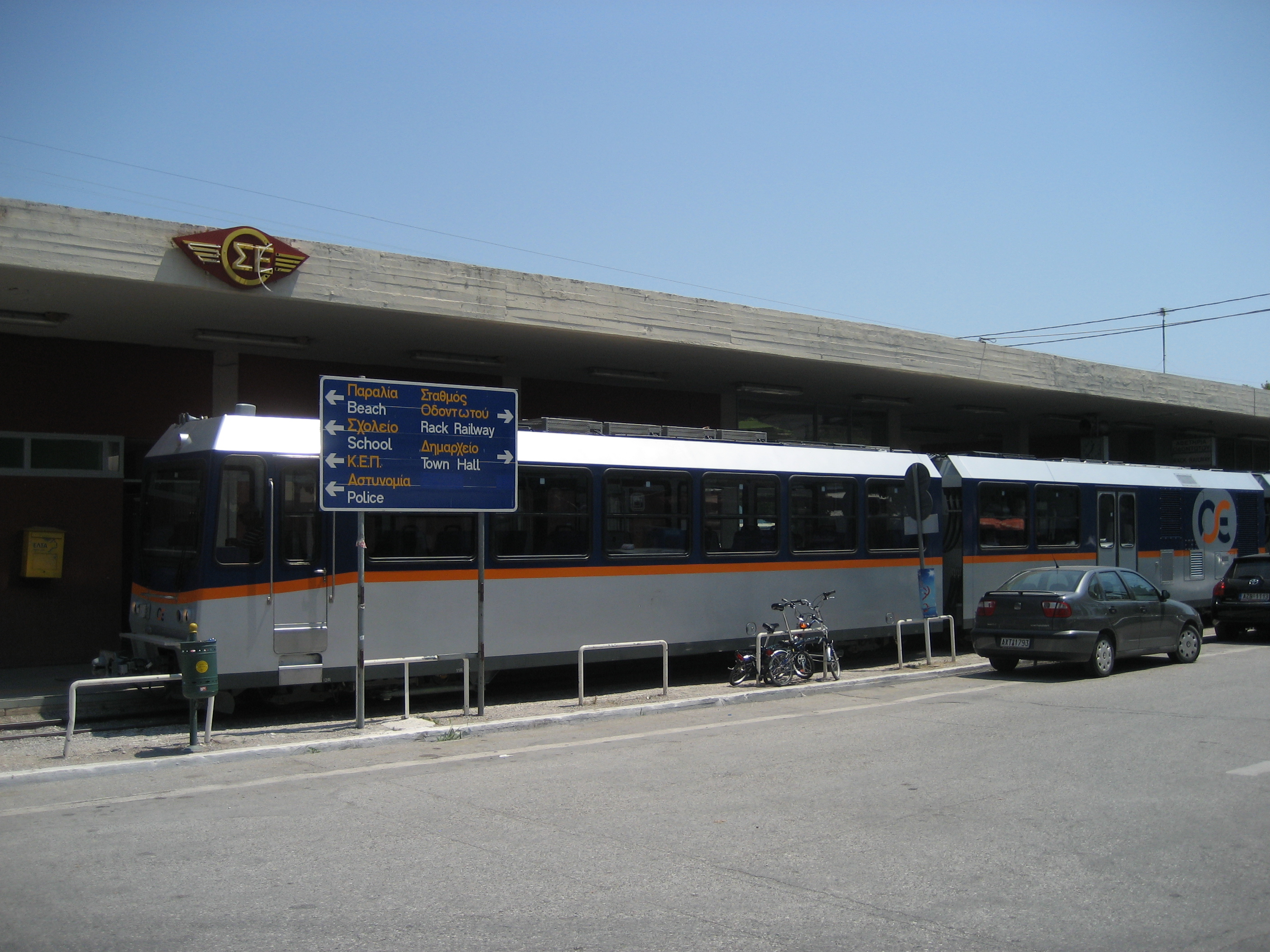
- Diakopto railway station before the upgrades, July 2009

General information
- Location: Diakopto 250 03, Achaea; Greece
- Coordinates: 38°11′30″N 22°11′52″E
- Owner: GAIAOSE
- Operator: Hellenic Train
- Lines: Airport–Patras railway; Diakopto–Kalavryta railway
- Platforms: 2 (island platforms)
- Tracks: 4

Construction
- Structure type: At-grade (Diakopto–Kalavryta line); Sub-surface (Airport–Patras line)
- Platform levels: 1
- Parking: Yes
- Cycle facilities: No

Other information
- Status: Unstaffed
- Website: http://www.ose.gr/en/

Key dates
- 10 March 1896: Opened
- 9 July 2007: Metre gauge service ended
- 22 June 2020: Standard gauge service started

Services
Preceding station	Hellenic Train	Following station
Eliki towards Aigio	G7 Kiato-Aigio	Platanos towards Kiato
Mega Spileo towards Kalavryta	RT1 Odontotos	Terminus
Former services
SPAP
Eleonas	Piraeus–Patras railway	Trapeza
Location

Diakopto railway station (Greek: Σιδηροδρομικός Σταθμός Διακοπτού, romanized: Sidirodromikós Stathmós Diakoptoú) is located just north of Diakopto, Achaea, Greece. Originally opened on 10 March 1896, it was reopened on 22 June 2020 as part of the Hellenic Railways Organisation's €848-million project extension of the Athens Airport–Patras railway to Aigio, co-financed by the European Union's Cohesion Fund 2000–2006. The station is currently served by both the unique rack railway to Kalavryta and Hellenic Train local services between Kiato and Aigio.

== History ==
The Station opened on 10 March 1896 on what was a branch line of the Piraeus, Athens & Peloponnese Railways (SPAP) when the 750 mm (2 ft 5 1/2 in) gauge line towards Kalavryta was completed in 1895. The line opened under the government of Theodoros Deligiannis however, work had been begun by the Charilaos Trikoupis government, under the grand project of connecting all of Greece by rail. The French company ATON with Italian craftsmen's assistant, who had acquired great experience in similar projects in the Alps, built the line. Soon Diakopto was connected to Athens, via Corinth by the Piraeus–Patras railway.

Due to growing debts, the SPAP came under government control between 1939 and 1940. During the Axis occupation of Greece (1941–44), Athens was controlled by German military forces and the line used for the transport of troops and weapons. During the occupation (and especially during the German withdrawal in 1944), the network was severely damaged by both the German army and Greek resistance groups. The track and rolling stock replacement took time following the civil war, with normal service levels resumed around 1948.

Between 2007 and 2009, the entire rail and cogwheel components of the Diakopto–Kalavryta railway were completely replaced, and four new modern trains were constructed to replace the older carriages. In 2008, railway operations in the region were transferred from OSE to TrainOSE. In 2009, with the Greek debt crisis unfolding OSE's Management was forced to reduce services across the network. Timetables were cutback and routes closed, as the government-run entity attempted to reduce overheads, this included all passenger and freight services on the metre gauge railway system in the Peloponnese in 2011.

However, Diakopto remained open, serving the rack railway. In 2018, work to incorporate the station into the Athens Airport–Patras railway commenced, requiring the conversion of the old metre-gauge track to standard gauge. In 2019 services were suspended due to a landslide. The station was reopened on 22 June 2020 by Minister for Transport, Kostas Karamanlis, re-establishing direct rail links with Athens via the Athens Suburban Railway. In July 2022, the station began being served by Hellenic Train, the rebranded TrainOSE. On April 29, 2024, rack railway service resumed with 3 roundtrips 7 days a week and 2 additional roundtrips daily on weekends.

The station is owned by GAIAOSE, which since 3 October 2001 owns most railway stations in Greece: the company was also in charge of rolling stock from December 2014 until October 2025, when Greek Railways (the owner of the Airport–Patras railway and the Odontotos) took over that responsibility.

== Facilities ==
There is level access from the small car park at the front of the station. It has two island platforms, with station buildings located at the platform level. The Station buildings are equipped only with a waiting area. At platform level, there are sheltered seating and Dot-matrix display departure and arrival screens and timetable poster boards on both platforms. It is equipped with CCTV, fire detection and Honeywell Security systems. Currently, there is no local bus stop connecting the station.

== Services ==
Since 22 November 2025, the following services call at this station:

- Hellenic Train local service between Kiato and Aigio, with six trains per day in each direction: passengers have to change at Kiato for Athens Suburban Railway trains towards Athens and Piraeus.

The station is also served by the following Hellenic Train route:

- The historic 750 mm (2 ft 5 1/2-in) gauge rack railway known locally as Οδοντωτός (Odontotós, "Cogwheel") to Kalavryta.

== Station layout ==
L Ground/Concourse	Customer service	Tickets/Exits
Level; Ε1	Platform 1	Hellenic Train to Aigio (Eliki) ←
Level; Ε1	Island platform, doors will open on the left
Level; Ε1	Platform 2	Hellenic Train to Kiato (Platanos)/Rack railway towards Kalavryta (Mega Spileo) →

== Gallery ==
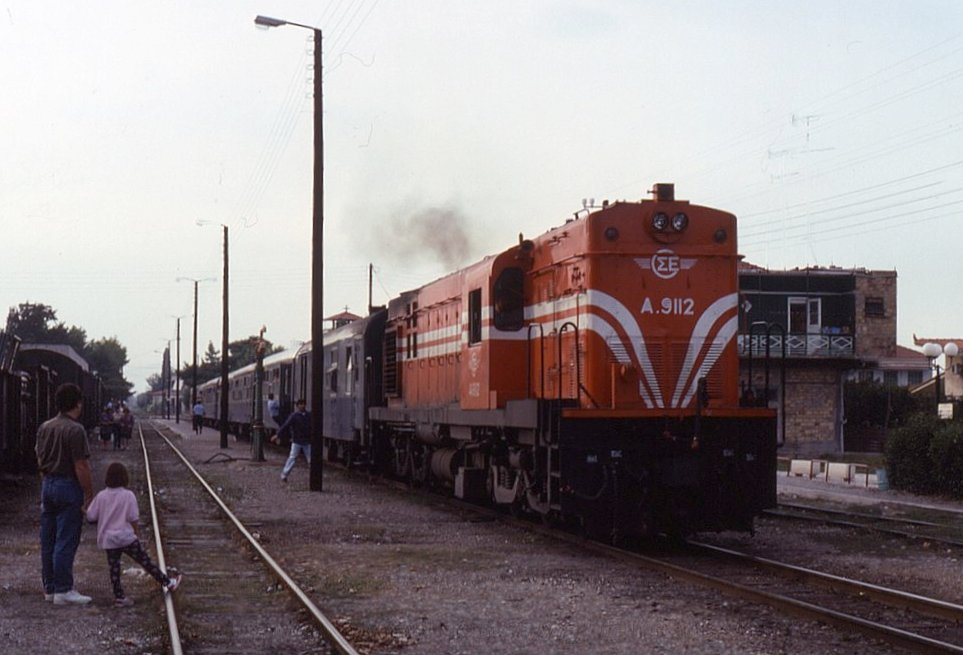
A.9112 seen at Diakopto, 1 November 1992

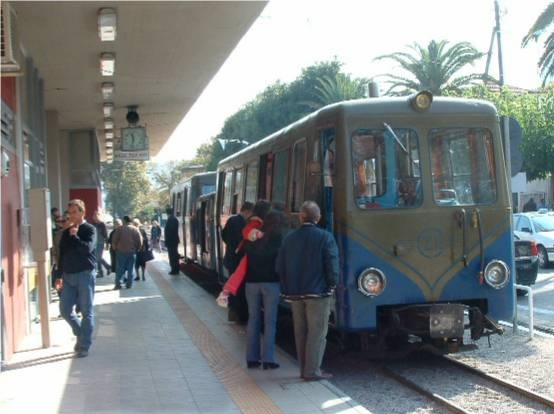
Diakofto station, 2005

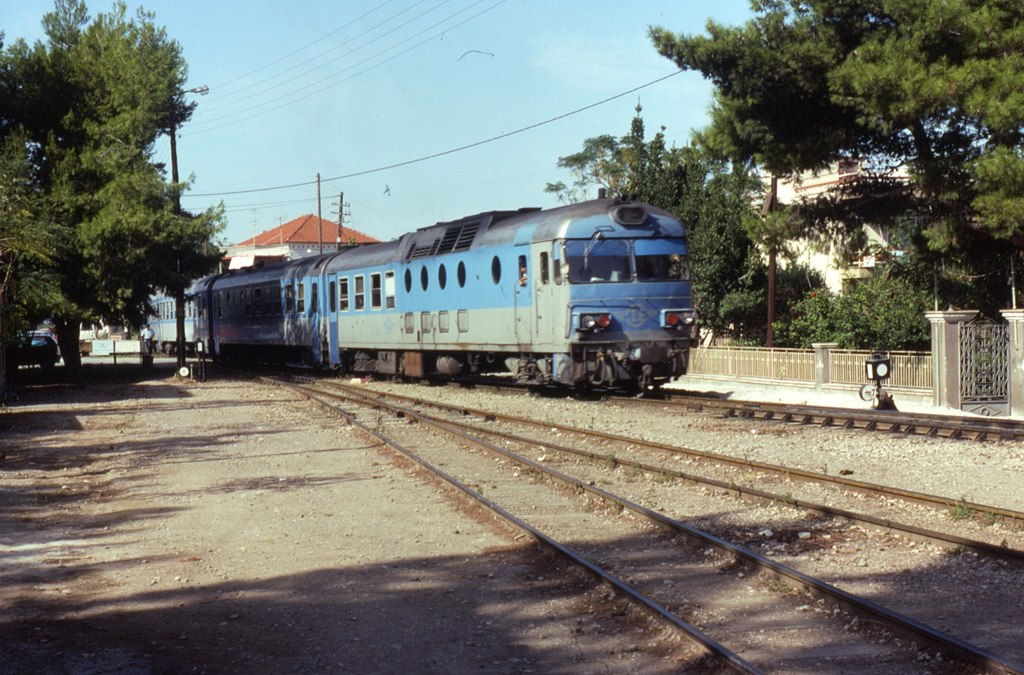
Several Ganz Mavag DMU's pulling into Diakopto on 1 November 1992 is set AA6454, a 4-car version used on long-distance trains, 1 November 1992.

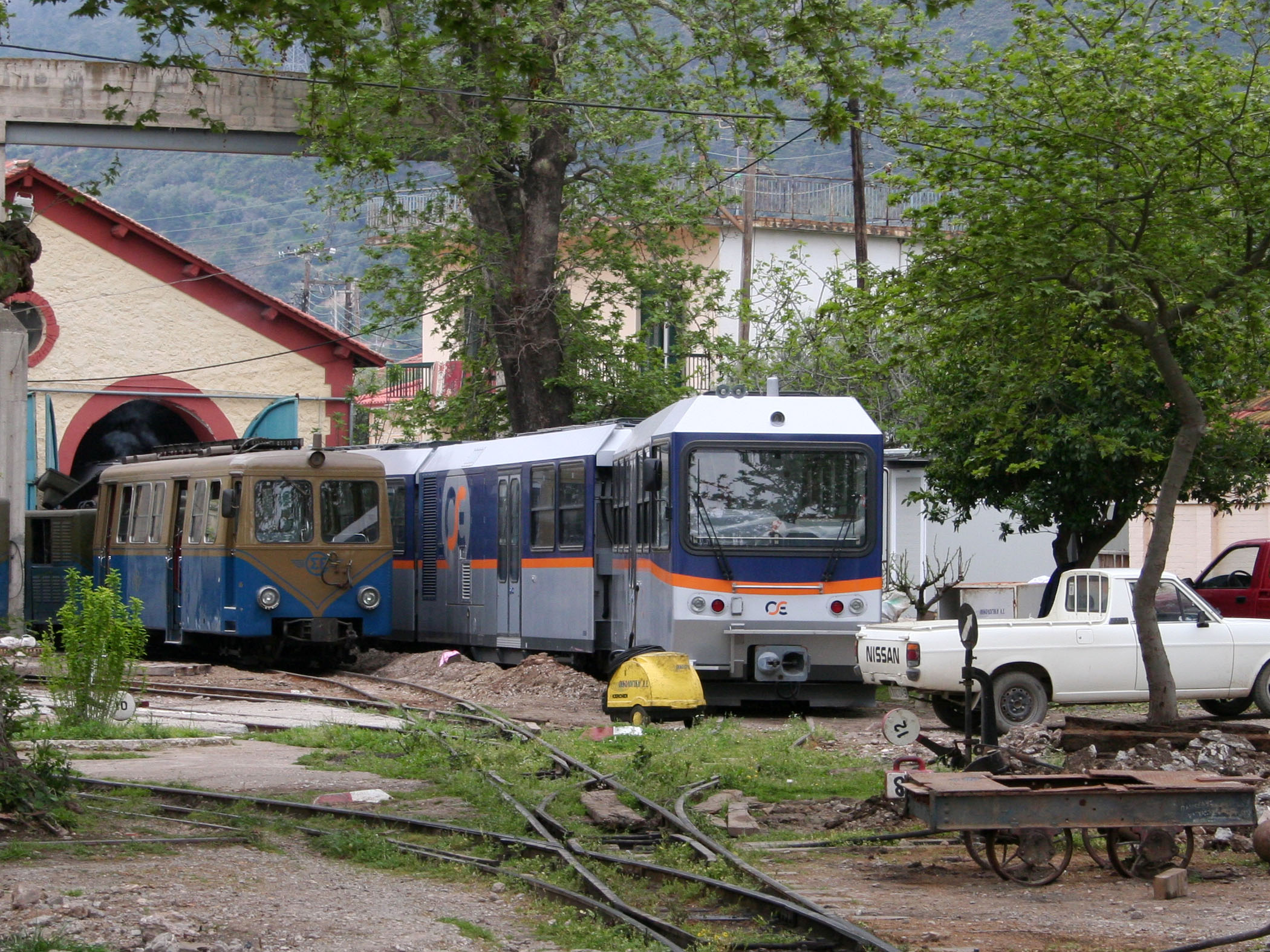
New (Stadler) and old (Decauville) rolling stock of the Diakofto-Kalavrita rack railway at Diakofto Engine Station. April 2009.

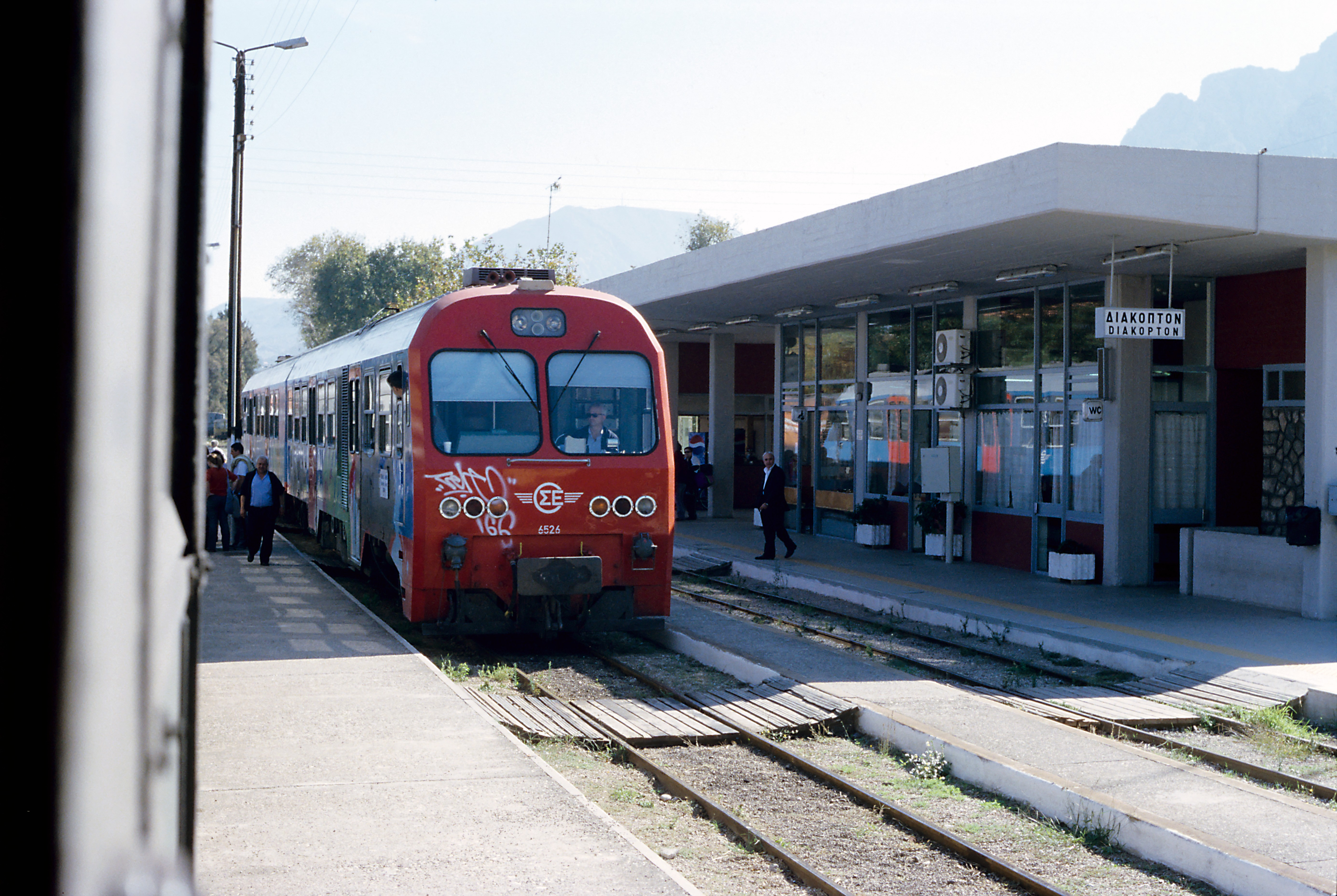
Train crossing in Diakoftó station, the MAN double DMU travels in the direction of Patra. In contrast to the IC units, which were only intended for the Peloponnisos network from the start. The place-name signs of this station only contained the Katharevousa form Diakoptón until it was closed, October 2005.

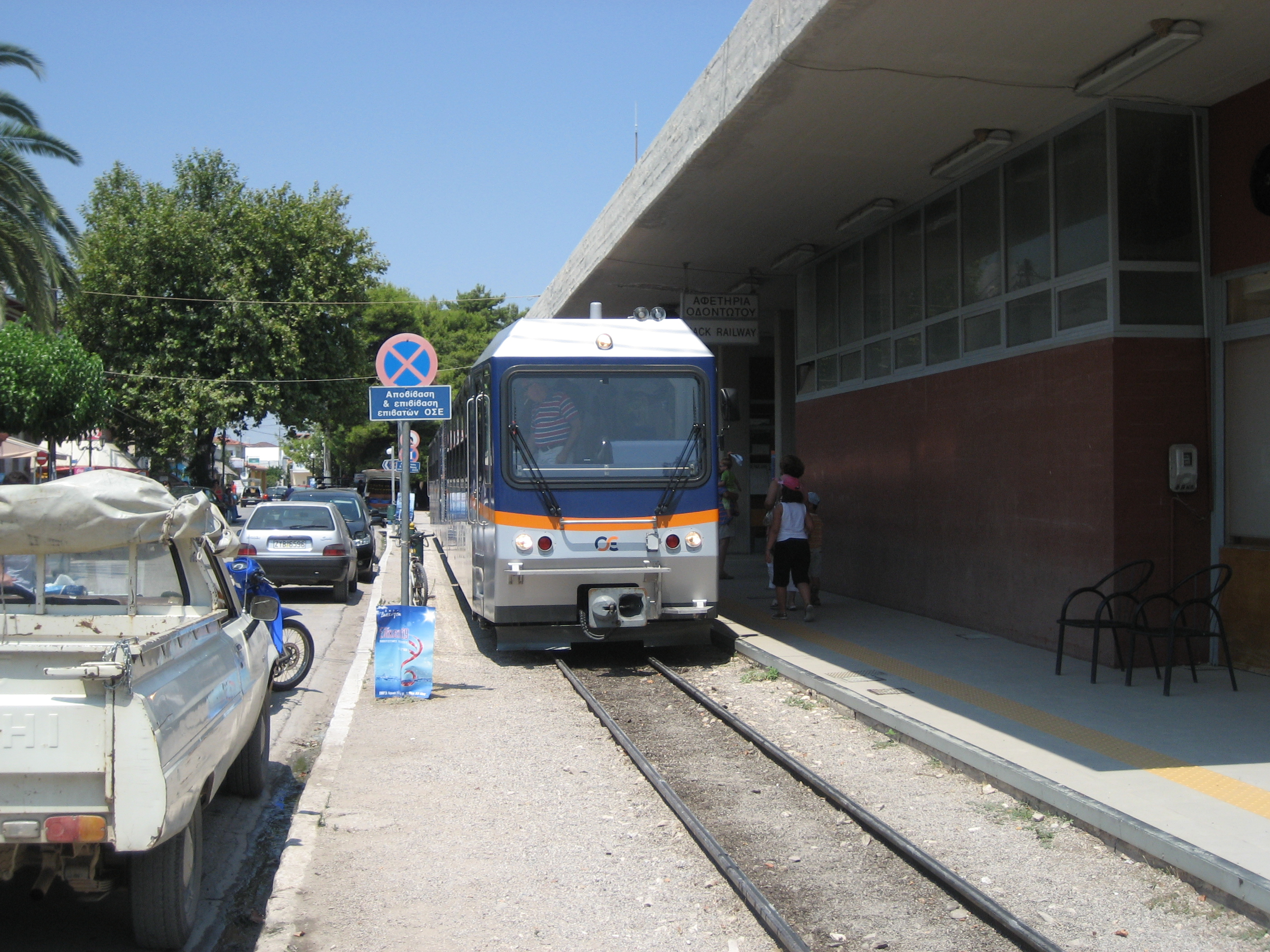
Diakofto-Kalavrita railway station, July 2009

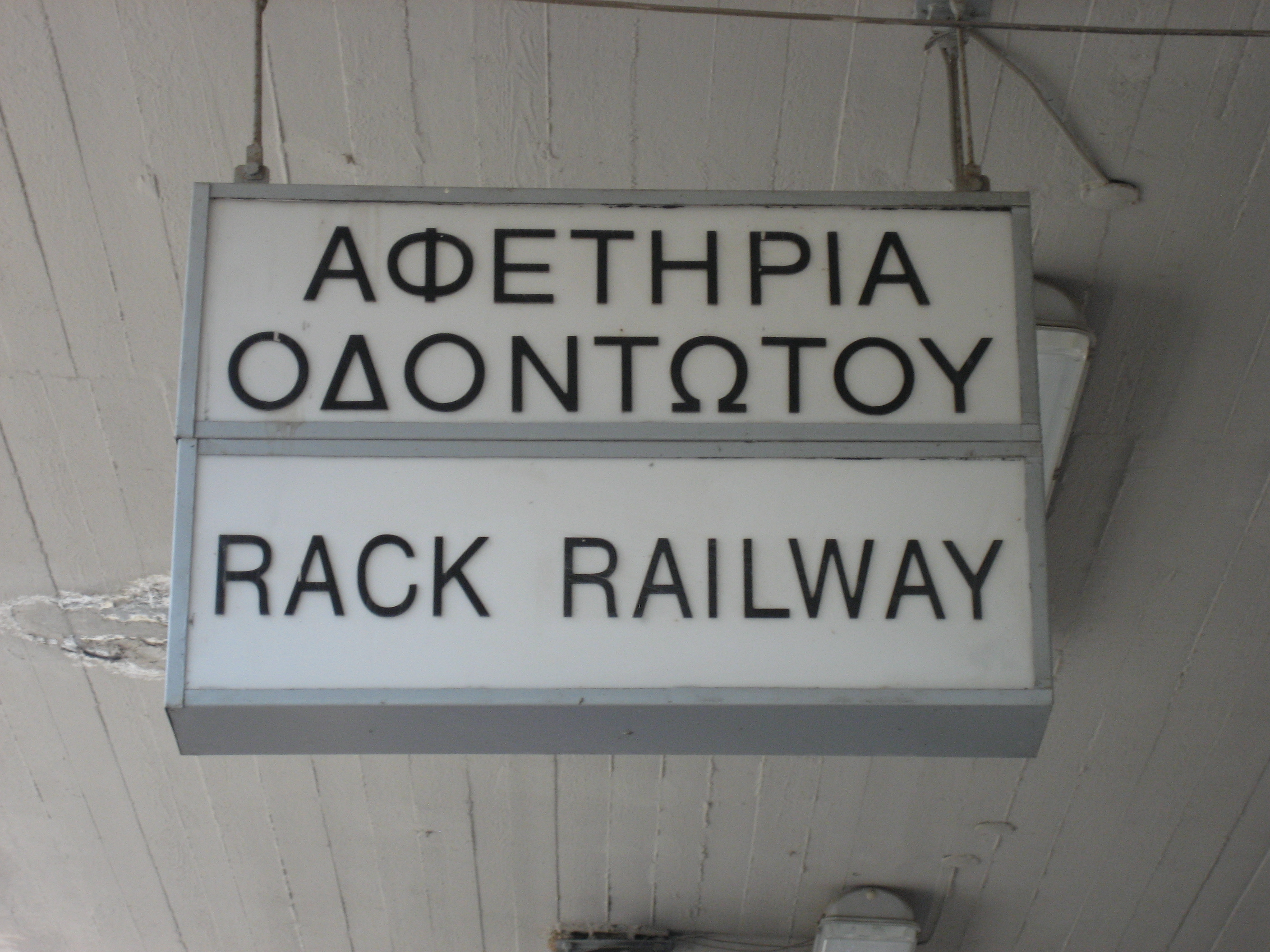
Station signage, July 2009

== See also ==
- Diakopto–Kalavryta railway
- Hellenic Railways Organization
- Hellenic Train
- P.A.Th.E./P.
- Piraeus, Athens and Peloponnese Railways
- Proastiakos
