= Kalamata railway station =

Railway station in Greece

Καλαμάτα Kalamata
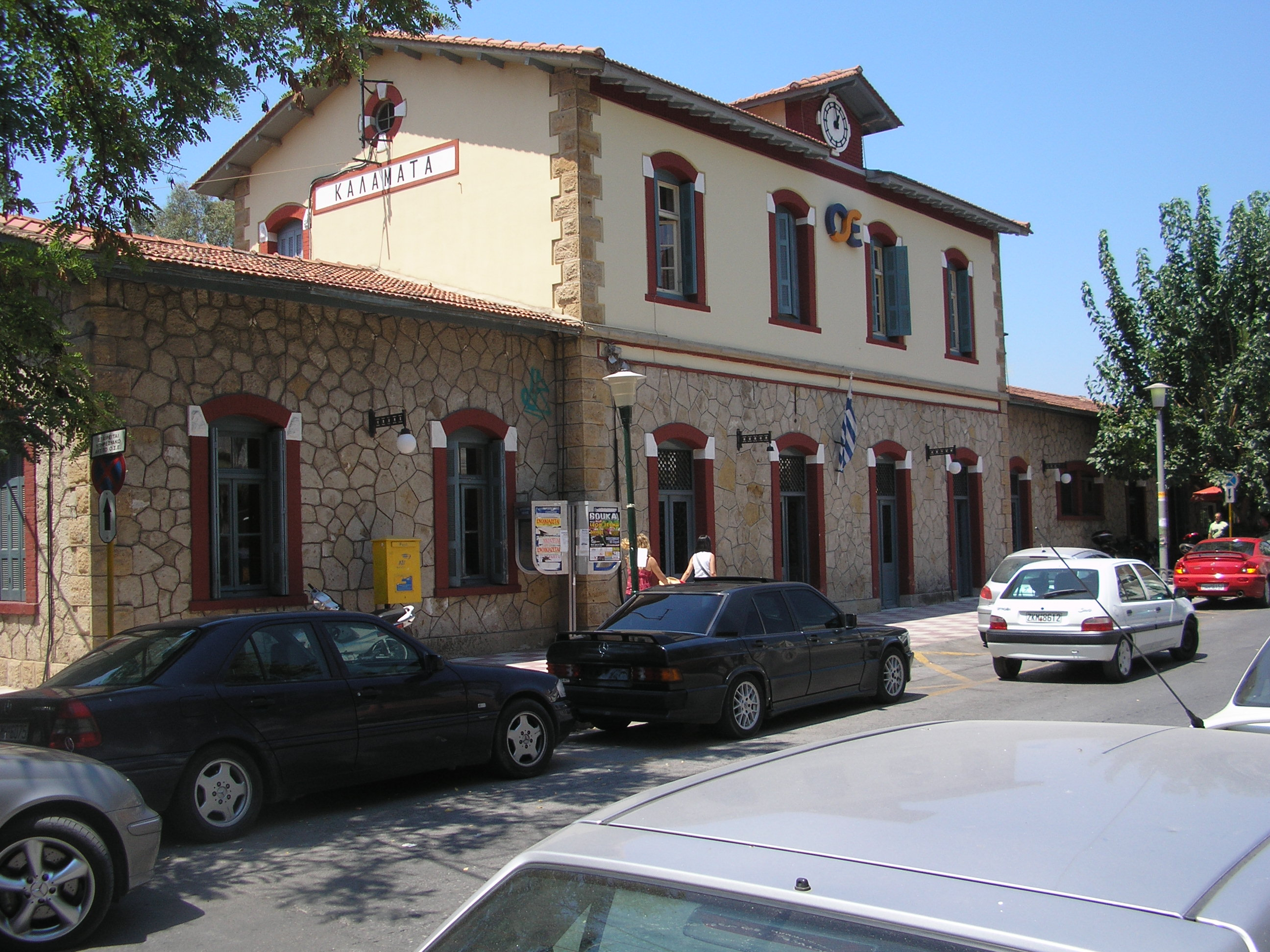
- Kalamata railway station in 2008

General information
- Location: Sidirodromikou Stathmou 32, Kalamata 241 00, Peloponnese; Greece
- Coordinates: 37.03777725026851°N 22.10915719532056°E
- System: SPAP, Messinian Suburban Railway
- Owner: GAIAOSE
- Line: Corinth–Kalamata railway
- Platforms: 2 (1 side platform, 1 island platform
- Tracks: 3
- Train operators: TrainOSE (former)

Construction
- Structure type: at-grade
- Platform levels: 1
- Parking: Yes
- Cycle facilities: No

Other information
- Status: Unstaffed
- Website: http://www.ose.gr/en/

History
- Opened: 1892
- Closed: 2010 for tactical services 2016 for seasonal
Location
- Location within Greece

Kalamata railway station (Greek: Σιδηροδρομικός Σταθμός Καλαμάτας, romanized: Sidirodromikos Stathmos Kalamata) is a disused railway station in Kalamata, Greece, located within the city itself. Opened 1892 by the Piraeus, Athens and Peloponnese Railways (now part of OSE). Until 2010 TrainOSE operated local and regional services to Katakolo, Pyrgos, Olympia and Kyparissia, and a suburban service to Messini and the General Hospital. At present, it is served by excursion trains while remaining inactive on other routes. The old station "Kalamata Limin" ,1 kilometer south, houses the open-air railway park, with several railway exhibits. Previously Piraeus, Athens and Peloponnese Railways operated a narrow gauge service to Athens from Kalamata. As of 2026, there are active attempts to create the Messinian Suburban Railway.

== History ==
The station was opened in 1892 as part of Piraeus, Athens and Peloponnese Railways. Part of the station still functions in this picturesque 1892 structure. The building is an example of industrial architecture, built of stone, while its roof is constructed of wood covered with tile. The door and window frames are decorated with red bricks while the windows are arched. The doors are paneled, while the outline of the building has a decorative ribbon. The intermediate part of the station building is two-story.

In 1920 SPAP was briefly nationalized as part of the Hellenic State Railways but became an independent company two years later. During the Axis occupation of Greece in World War 2, and especially during the withdrawal of German troops in 1944, the network and the rolling stock suffered extensive damage both by the German army and by Greek resistance groups. Repair of SPAP assets was time-consuming and expensive. Damaged rolling stock was mainly repaired at Piraeus Engine Sheds. Normal levels of service resumed at about 1948, with the exception of the destroyed bridge of Achladokampos (between Argos and Tripoli), which was rebuilt in 1974. Due to high debts, SPAP came under government control in 1939–1940 and was formally nationalized again in 1954. In 1962 the company was absorbed by the Hellenic State Railways. In 1962 SPAP was absorbed into Hellenic State Railways (SEK). In 1970 OSE became the legal successor to the SEK, taking over responsibilities for most of Greece's rail infrastructure.

In 2009, with the Greek debt crisis unfolding OSE's Management was forced to reduce services across the network. Timetables were cut back, and routes closed as the government-run entity attempted to reduce overheads. In 2011 all passenger and freight services on the metre gauge railway system in the Peloponnese were suspended, with the likelihood of full restoration of services a distant prospect. However, a short section through the port city of Patras remains open as a suburban railway. In 2017 OSE's passenger transport sector was privatised as TrainOSE, currently a wholly owned subsidiary of Ferrovie dello Stato Italiane infrastructure, including stations, remained under the control of OSE.

== Future prospects ==
As of October 2025, new proposals have emerged regarding the potential reactivation of rail services in the wider Kalamata region. The Municipal Council of Kalamata has formally requested the creation of the Messinian Suburban Railway, consisting of two lines: Kalamata - Messini and Kalamata - Diavolitsi, aiming to provide sustainable regional transport and strengthen local connectivity.

In 2024, a new company named EMSE S.A ( Hellenic Meridian Railways ) was founded with the objective of restoring and operating the Corinth - Kalamata Metre-gauge line as part of a wider plan to revive the Peloponnese railway network.

At the same time, Levante Trains A.E., which will be operating the Katakolo - Olympia line after 2026, has expressed its intention to expand operations toward Kalo Nero - Kopanaki - Zevgolateio known as the western Peloponnese corridor.

These initiatives indicate renewed local and private interest in the reactivation of railway services in southern Peloponnese, although no official government approval has yet been issued.

It is also worth noting that the Swiss Embassy with ELLET are currently running feasibility studies for restoration and usage of the Korinth - Kalamata Line

On 31 December 2025 a festive train with Santa Clause and his Elves will arrive at the station and then, loaded with passengers, will do a small route till Asprochoma as a sign of revitalization of the line. The train arriving at 13:00 (local time) will stop at the second platform in order to protect the spectators and have enough space. If there are many people there will be a 2nd or even 3rd route.The technicians of OSE visited the line in early September and they came to the conclusion that the line is in excellent condition, even better than lines active today. The municipality of Kalamata has started to maintain the railway while the railway friends association of Messinia opened, cleaned and decorated the station's master office after 10 years. A team made by volunteers repainted and cleaned the 2 MAN1 DMUs that will be used on the event.

After 11 years in 22/12/2025 the train stopped in Kalamata's station while running tests and rehearsing for New Year's Eve

== Facilities ==
The station building is still intact, if a little rundown. There are toilets and parking onsite. Local and regional buses stop in the forecourt. In 2008 there was a working public phone outside the Booking hall, however it is unknown if it is still in working order. As well as a café, the previous station offices also provide facilities for the “Harmonia” – Kalamata Friends of Music Association, the Kalamata Orpheus Music Group, and the Messenia branch of the Hellenic Search and Rescue Service.

== Services ==
Until 2010 TrainOSE operated local and regional services to Katakolo, Pyrgos and Olympia and Kyparissia, and a suburban service to Messini and the General Hospital until 2016. At present, it is served by excursion trains, while remaining inactive on other routes, but the area houses the open-air railway park, with several railway exhibits. Previously Piraeus, Athens and Peloponnese Railways operated a narrow gauge service to Athens from Kalamata; however, this service later upgraded to standard-gauge and now forms the backbone of Line 5 of the Athens Suburban Railway.

== Station layout ==
L Ground/Concourse	Customer service	Tickets/Exits
Level; Ε1	Side platform, doors will open on the right
Level; Ε1	Platform 1	towards ←
Level; Ε1	Platform 2	Intercity towards ←
Level; Ε1	Island platform, doors on the right/left
Level; Ε1	Platform 3	In non-regular use

== Gallery ==
Kalamata station, c.1910
