= Kalavryta railway station =

Railway station in Greece

Καλάβρυτα Kalavryta
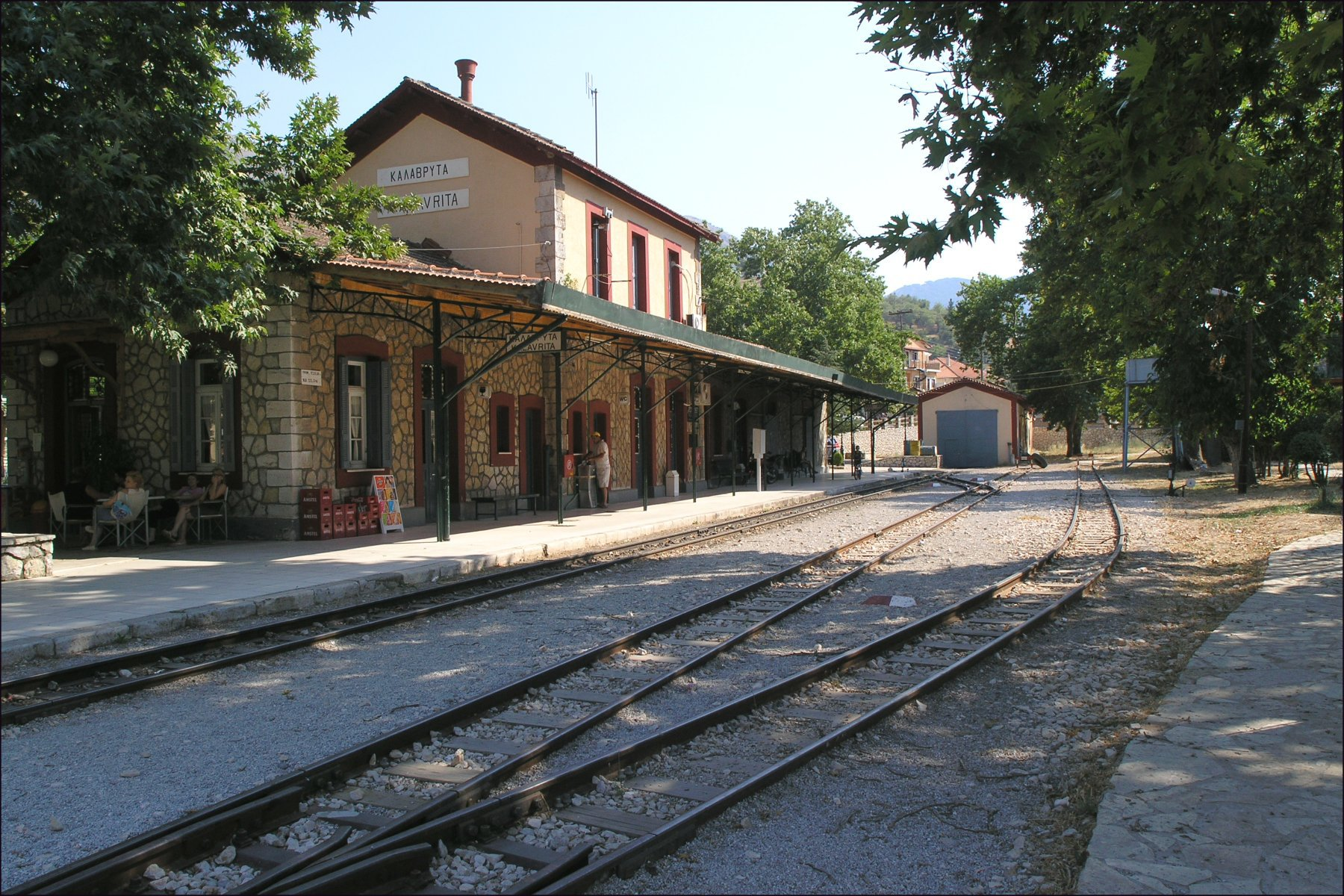
- Kalavryta Kalavrita railway station, July 2007

General information
- Location: Kalavryta 250 03, Achaea; Greece
- Coordinates: 38°02′01″N 22°06′36″E
- Owner: GAIAOSE
- Line: Diakopto–Kalavryta railway
- Platforms: 1 (Side platforms)
- Tracks: 3 (2 sidings)
- Train operators: Hellenic Train

Construction
- Structure type: at-grade
- Platform levels: 1
- Parking: Yes
- Cycle facilities: No

Other information
- Status: Unstaffed
- Website: http://www.ose.gr/en/

History
- Opened: 10 March 1896; 130 years ago

Services
Preceding station	Hellenic Train	Following station
Terminus	RT1 Odontotos	Mega Spileo towards Diakopto
Location
- Location within Greece

Kalavryta railway station (Greek: Σιδηροδρομικός Σταθμός Καλαβρύτων, romanized: Sidirodromikós Stathmós Kalavríton) is a train station in Kalavryta, Achaea, Greece. It is located just North of the village. It was opened on 10 March 1896. The station is served by the Diakopto–Kalavryta railway a rack railway (known locally as the 'Cogwheel' or 'Toothache').

== History ==
The Station opened on 10 March 1896 on what was a branch line of the Piraeus, Athens & Peloponnese Railways (SPAP) when the 750 mm (2 ft 5 1/2 in) gauge line was completed in 1895. The line opened under the government of Theodoros Deligiannis however, work had been authorised by Charilaos Trikoupis government, under the grand project of connecting all of Greece by rail. The French company ATON "with Italian craftsmen's assistant, who had acquired great experience in similar projects in the Alps, built the line. The construction of the network began in 1889 and was completed in 1895". Due to growing debts, the SPAP came under government control between 1939 and 1940. During the Axis occupation of Greece (1941–44), Athens was controlled by German military forces and the line used for the transport of troops and weapons. During the occupation (and especially during German withdrawal in 1944), the network was severely damaged by both the German army and Greek resistance groups. The track and rolling stock replacement took time following the civil war, with normal service levels resumed around 1948. In 1954 SPAP was nationalized once more. In 1962 the SPAP was amalgamated into SEK. In 1970, OSE became the legal successor to the SEK, taking over responsibilities for most of Greece's rail infrastructure. On 1 January 1971, the station and most of the Greek rail infrastructure were transferred to the Hellenic Railways Organisation S.A., a state-owned corporation. Freight traffic declined sharply when the state-imposed monopoly of OSE for the transport of agricultural products and fertilisers ended in the early 1990s. Many small stations of the network with little passenger traffic were closed down.

In 2001 the infrastructure element of OSE was created, known as GAIAOSE; it would henceforth be responsible for the maintenance of stations, bridges and other elements of the network, as well as the leasing and the sale of railway assists. In 2005, TrainOSE was created as a brand within OSE to concentrate on rail services and passenger interface. Between 2007 and 2009, the entire rails and cog sections were completely replaced, and four new modern trains were constructed to replace the former carriages. In 2009, with the Greek debt crisis unfolding OSE's Management, was forced to reduce services across the network. Timetables were cutback and routes closed, as the government-run entity attempted to reduce overheads.

In 2016, to celebrate 120 years of railways in Greece, the station welcomed the mayor of Kalavrita George Lazouras, the philharmonic and trains of three different "eras", and the album about the Cog Railway, written by George Nathainas was unveiled that day as part of the celebrations along with a commemorative stamp. In 2017 OSE's passenger transport sector was privatised as TrainOSE, currently, a wholly owned subsidiary of Ferrovie dello Stato Italiane infrastructure, including stations, remained under the control of OSE. In 2019, services were suspended due to a landslide. On April 29, 2024, service resumed with 3 roundtrips 7 days a week and 2 additional roundtrips daily on weekends.

== Facilities ==
There is level access from the small car park at the front of the station. It has one Side platforms, with station buildings located at the platform level. The Station buildings are equipped with a waiting area. At platform level, there are sheltered seating but no Dot-matrix display departure or arrival screens or timetable poster boards. Today, there is a cafeteria at the station. Currently (2020), there are local buses connecting the station.

== Services ==
The station is served by the historic 750 mm (2 ft 5 1/2 in) gauge Diakopto–Kalavryta railway rack railway known locally as Cogwheel services to Diakopto. The station usually sees six trains per day.

== Gallery ==
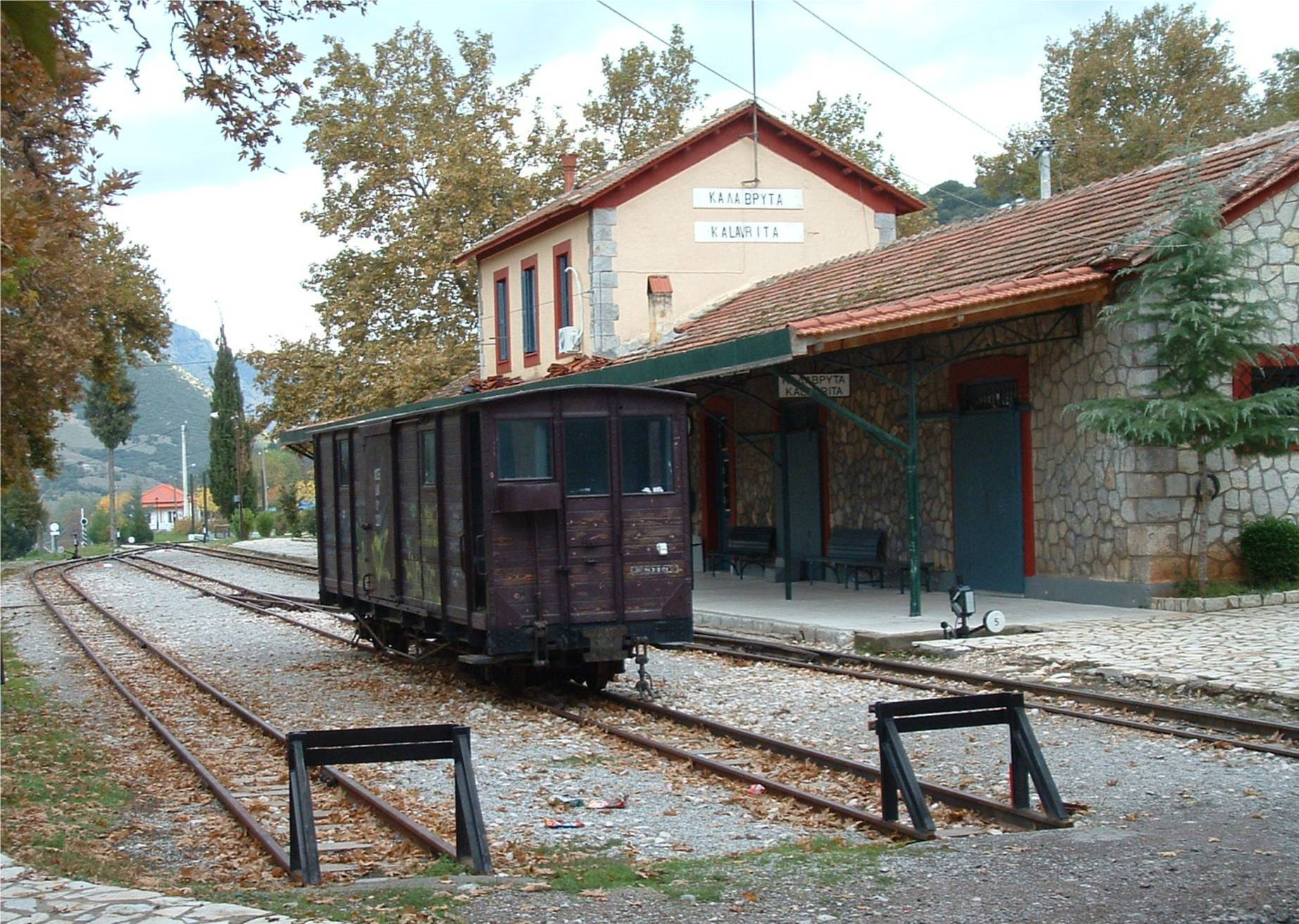
The Station 15 November 2005

== See also ==
- Hellenic Railways Organization
- Piraeus, Athens and Peloponnese Railways
- Diakopto–Kalavryta railway
- TrainOSE
