= Diakopto–Kalavryta railway =

Greek rack railway

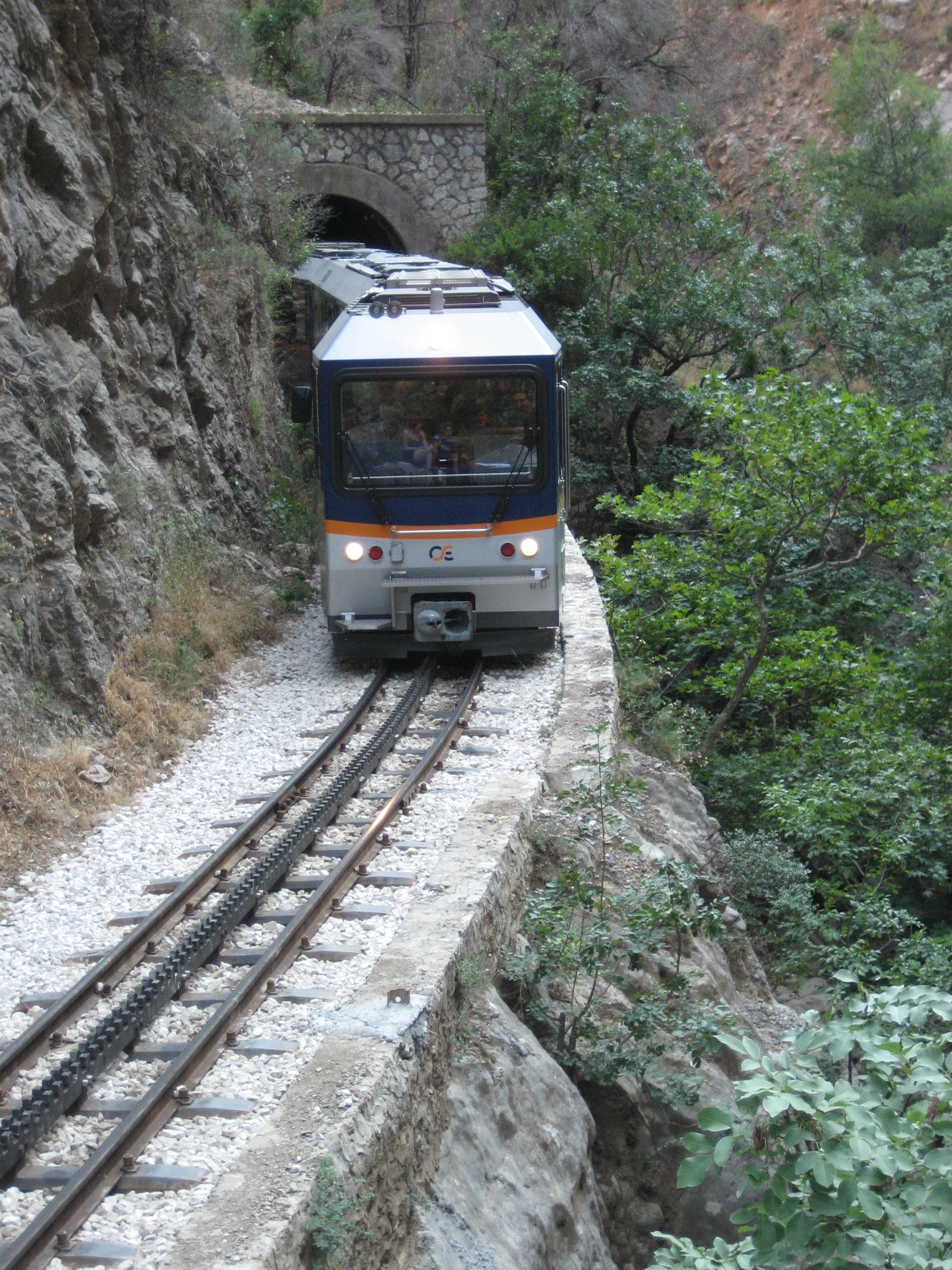

Overview
- Status: Operational
- Owner: GAIAOSE
- Locale: Central Greece
- Termini: Diakopto 38.191748°N 22.197915°E; Kalavryta 38.033602°N 22.110070°E
- Stations: 6 (3 disused)

Service
- Type: Abt system
- Operator: Hellenic Train

History
- Opened: 10 March 1896

Technical
- Line length: 22.346 km (13.885 mi)
- Number of tracks: single track
- Track gauge: 750 mm (2 ft 5 1/2 in)
- Electrification: diesel-electric
- Operating speed: 80 km/h (50 mph) (average)

The Diakopto–Kalavryta railway (Greek: Οδοντωτός σιδηρόδρομος Διακοπτού - Καλαβρύτων, romanized: Odontotós sidiródromos Diakoptoú - Kalavrýton) is a historic 750 mm (2 ft 5 1/2-in) gauge rack railway in Greece. Located on the northern Peloponnese, it runs 22 kilometres (14 mi) from Diakopto through the Vouraikos Gorge and the old Mega Spilaion Monastery and up to Kalavryta, stopping en route at Zachlorou. Today, the stations infrastructure and rolling stock are owned and maintained by the GAIAOSE and the line infrastructure Hellenic Railways Organisation (OSE) and passenger trains are operated by Hellenic Train. At the Diakopto terminus, the line connects with the new standard-gauge Athens Airport–Patras railway where the new main line tunnels under the station yard. It now takes 2 hours 10 minutes to reach Athens.

== Route ==
The line starts at Diakopto before entering the gorge of Vouraikos. Makes stops at the locations "Niamata" (or "Mikrohelidou") and "Triklia". Between Niamata and Triklia there was an old stop (closed in 1960) at the kilometre 8.14 (the old stop Triklia). In the middle of the route, after 12.6 kilometres (7.8 mi), it makes a stop in the village of Kato Zachlorou, while at this point it serves the visitors of the historic Monastery of the Great Cave. Then, after 18.2 kilometres (11.3 mi) of route, it makes a stop southeast under the village of Kerpini, where you pass, but do not stop at "Kerpini railway station" (formerly "Rallia"), and finally ends in Kalavrita. The line has 9 level crossings (with 6 asphalt roads and 3 dirt roads) of which 3 are guarded (one in Diakopto, one near Kerpini Station and one in Kalavrita).

== Stations ==
The main stations on the Diakopto–Kalavryta railway are:

- Diakopto railway station
- Mega Spileo railway station
- Kalavryta railway station

== History ==
Work began on the line in 1885. The line opened on 10 March 1896, as a branch line of the Piraeus, Athens & Peloponnese Railways (SPAP) when the 750 mm (2 ft 5 1/2 in) gauge line was completed in 1895. The line opened under the government of Theodoros Deligiannis however, work had been authorised by Charilaos Trikoupis government, as part of the grand project to connect all of Greece by rail. The line was built by French company ATON, with the assistance of Italian craftsmen who had acquired great experience in similar projects in the Alps. The construction of the network began in 1889 and was completed in 1895. It was one of the most difficult projects for its time due to the very inaccessible terrain but also the high altitude at which it ended, as the Odontotos is the steepest railway in Greece. The railway includes three stretches of rack: where the gradient exceeds 10%, gear wheels on the train engage with toothed rails in the centre of the track. The railway crosses the Vouraikos gorge passing through a long length of tunnels and bridges.

Due to growing debts, the SPAP came under government control between 1939 and 1940. During the Axis occupation of Greece (1941–44), Athens was controlled by German military forces, and the line used for the transport of troops and weapons. During the occupation (and especially during German withdrawal in 1944), the network was severely damaged by both the German army and Greek resistance groups. The track and rolling stock replacement took time following the civil war, with normal service levels resumed around 1948. In 1954 SPAP was nationalized once more. In 1962 the SPAP was amalgamated into SEK. In 1970 OSE became the legal successor to the SEK, taking over responsibility for most of Greece's rail infrastructure. On 1 January 1971 the station, and most of the Greek rail infrastructure, was transferred to the Hellenic Railways Organisation S.A., a state-owned corporation. Freight traffic declined sharply with the deregulation of the transport of agricultural products and fertilisers in the early 1990s. Many small stations of the network with little passenger traffic were closed down. Between 2007 and 2009 all the rails and rack sections were replaced, and four new Diesel-electric trains were introduced. In 2009, with the Greek debt crisis unfolding OSE's management was forced to reduce services across the network. Timetables were cut back and routes closed, as the company attempted to reduce overheads.

In 2016 to celebrate 120 years of railways in Greece, the Kalavryta station welcomed the mayor of Kalavrita George Lazouras, the philharmonic and trains of three different eras, and the album about the Cog Railway, written by George Nathainas was unveiled that day as part of the celebrations along with a commemorative stamp. In 2017 OSE's passenger transport sector was privatised as TrainOSE, currently, a wholly owned subsidiary of Ferrovie dello Stato Italiane infrastructure, including stations, remained under the control of OSE. In 2019 services were suspended due to a landslide. On April 29, 2024, service resumed with 3 roundtrips 7 days a week and 2 additional roundtrips daily on weekends.

== Extensions ==
- Tripoli: The original plans of the line envisaged the extension of the line from Kalavrita to Tripoli, but it was cancelled for financial reasons during the construction phase of the line before any works had begun.
- Agia Lavra - Chelmos Ski Station: Since 1996 OSE. has been planning an extension of the line from Kalavrita to the historic Monastery of Agia Lavra and the Ski Center of Kalavrita with a length of 4.5 kilometres (2.8 mi). In January 2021, the issue of extension entered the auction trajectory due to the celebration of the National Uprising bicentennial. In the first phase, there will be a bus connection of the cogwheel railway from Kalavrita to Chelmos Ski Station.

== Technical information ==
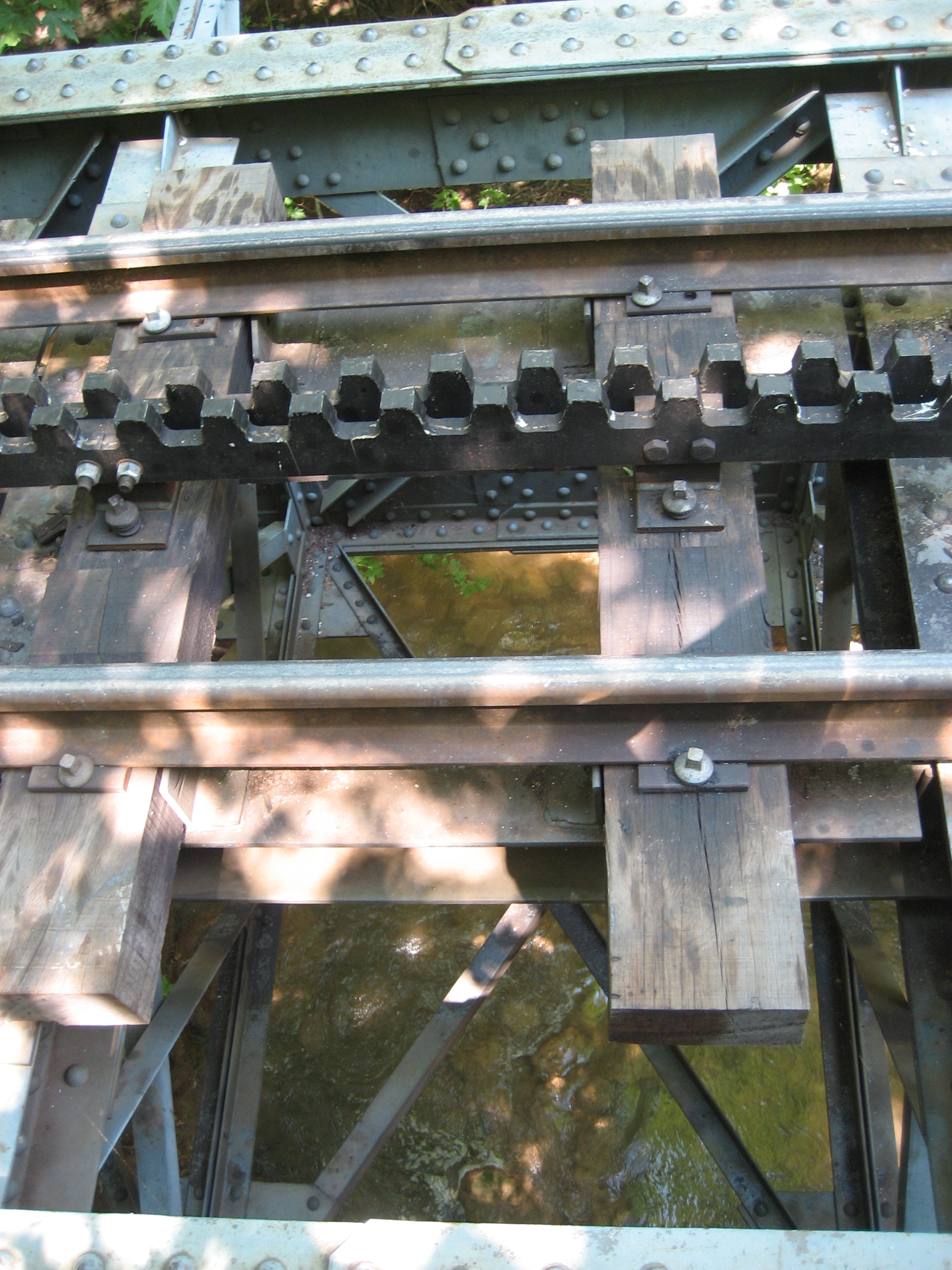
The rack on the river bridge

The railway is single line with 750 mm (2 ft 5 1/2 in) gauge. It climbs from sea level to 720 m (2,360 ft) in 22.3 km (13.9 mi) with a maximum gradient of 17.5%. There are three sections with Abt system rack for a total of 3.8 km. Maximum speed is 40 km/h (25 mph) for adhesion sections and 12 km/h (7.5 mph) for rack sections.

There are many bridges over the Vouraikos River, numerous tunnels, and passing loops at Niamata, Triklia, Zachlorou and Kerpini. The rolling stock sheds and maintenance facilities are located at Diakopto; there were additional facilities at Kalavrita station during the steam era, but they are no longer in use.

The line was to be electrified and electric multiple units were ordered from Billard in France. Before the cars arrived, the electrification plans were cancelled and the electric multiple units were thus not usable when they arrived. As a makeshift solution, a power car carrying a diesel generator was placed between the two cars, a solution that has worked very well for decades.

== Service ==
Between 2007 and 2009 OSE undertook large scale improvement works and upgrades across the line, including bridges, enlargement of tunnels and replacement of the rack and testing of new rolling stock. These renovation works on the northern part of the line involved the entire rails and cog sections were completely replaced and four new modern trains were constructed to replace the former carriages. During which the line was wholly or partly closed. As of Autumn 2016, there are three trips on weekdays and five on weekends. Passengers buying a round-trip ticket from Diakopto and taking the first train to Kalavrita were allowed to return later in the day on any of the other service. An extended service on weekends and public holidays is operated with two additional trains.

== Rolling stock ==
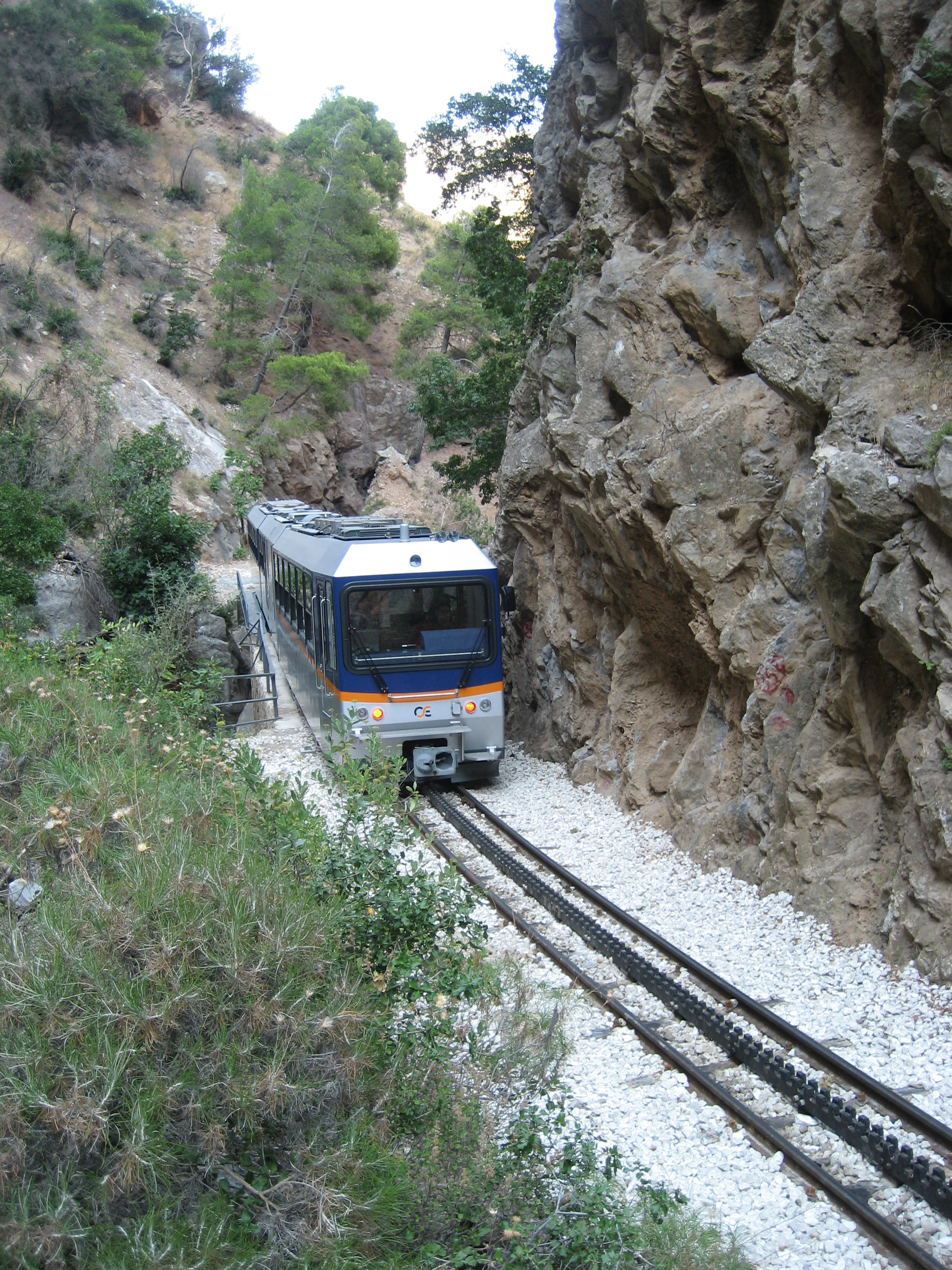
The newer Diesel-electric trainsets from Stadler Rail

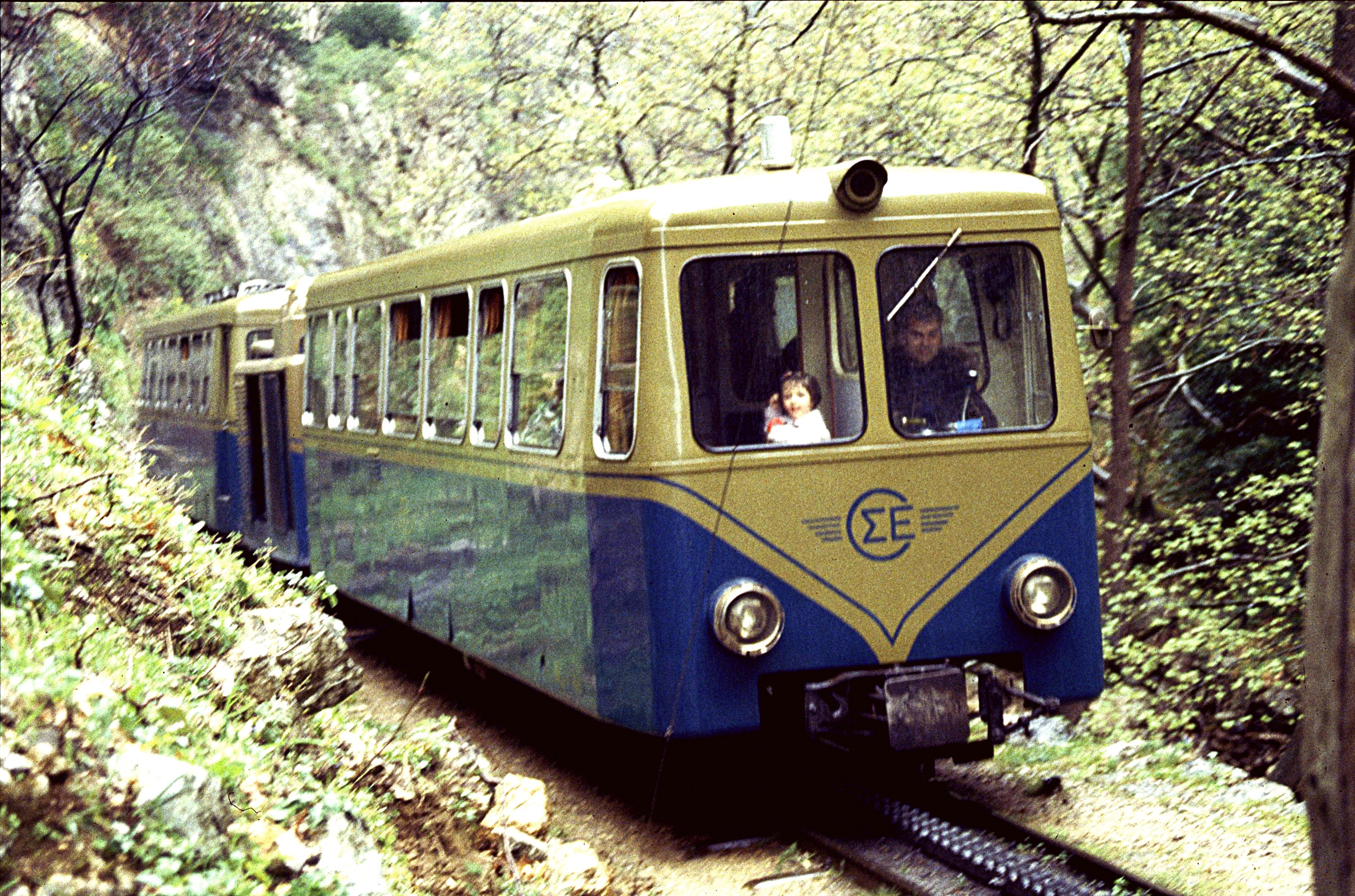
The older Decauville train in Vouraikos

=== Steam locomotives ===
Six steam locomotives were constructed specifically for this line, on a basic design by Cail (1891).

Locomotive	Type	Supplier	Year	Notes
ΔΚ1; ΔΚ-8001	0-6-2RT	Cail	1891	Preserved in good condition at Kalavryta
ΔΚ2	0-6-2RT	Cail	1891	
ΔΚ3; ΔΚ-8003	0-6-2RT	Cail	1891	Displayed on a plinth at Diakopto
ΔΚ4	0-6-2RT	Cail	1891	Displayed at the Railway Museum of Athens.
ΔΚ11	0-6-2RT	Krupp	1891	Boiler with superheater
ΔΚ-8005	0-6-2RT	SPAP Piraeus Works	1954	

=== Diesel trainsets ===
The first batch of modern rolling stock for the Diakopto–Kalavryta railway consists of three Diesel-electric trainsets (Class 3001) built by Billard in 1958. They were numbered ΑΔΚ 01 to ΑΔΚ 03, later renumbered as ΑΒδφπτ 3001 to ΑΒδφπτ 3003. Three similar trainsets (Class 3004) built by Decauville were added in 1967. They were numbered ΑΒδφπτ 3004 to ΑΒδφπτ 3006. These trainsets, both types of similar configuration, consist of two passenger cars (a motor car and a control car) and a generator trailer or "OPE" (Greek: ΟΠΕ) between them. In addition, a steam locomotive (ΔΚ 8003, delivered by Cail in 1891) is preserved at Kalavryta station and has been used occasionally for special trains.

Four new three-car Diesel-electric trainsets were ordered from Stadler Rail to replace the old rolling stock and entered service in 2009. These are designated as Class 3107.

Train	Supplier	Year	Railcars
3001	Billard	1958	3001+OPE3501+3001
3002	Billard	1958	3002+OPE3502+3002
3003	Billard	1958	3003+OPE3503
3004	Decauville	1967	3004+OPE3504+3004
3005	Decauville	1967	3005+OPE3505+3005
3006	Decauville	1967	3006+OPE3506+3006
3107	Stadler	2009	3107+3507+3207
3108	Stadler	2009	3108+3508+3208
3109	Stadler	2009	3109+3509+3209
3110	Stadler	2009	3110+3510+3210

== Reception ==
The railway and its Diakofto steam engine (called Madame Hortense) feature prominently in Gerald Durrells 1974 fantasy children's book "The Talking Parcel" and its film adaptation.

== Gallery ==
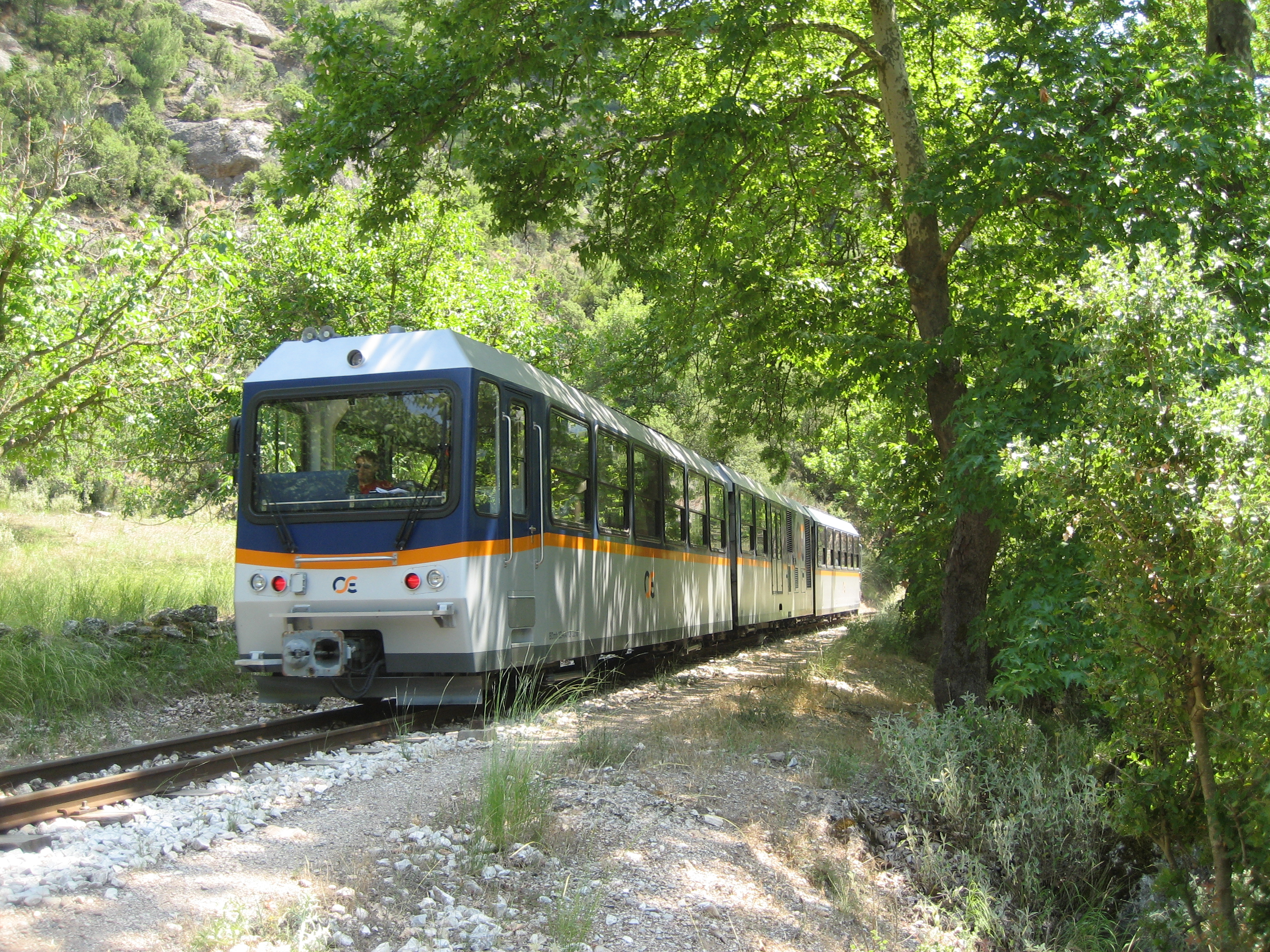
Diakopto–Kalavryta railway unit

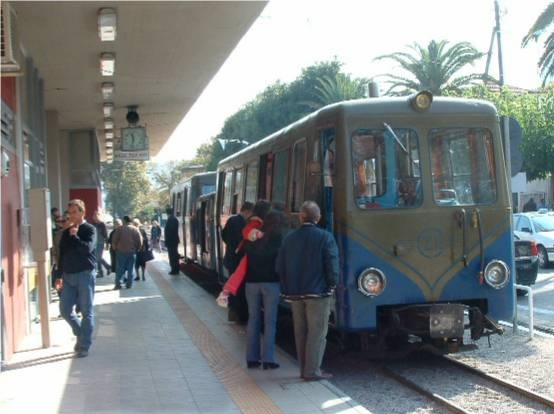
New (Stadler) and old (Decauville) rolling stock of the Diakofto-Kalavrita rack railway at Diakofto Engine Station. April 2009

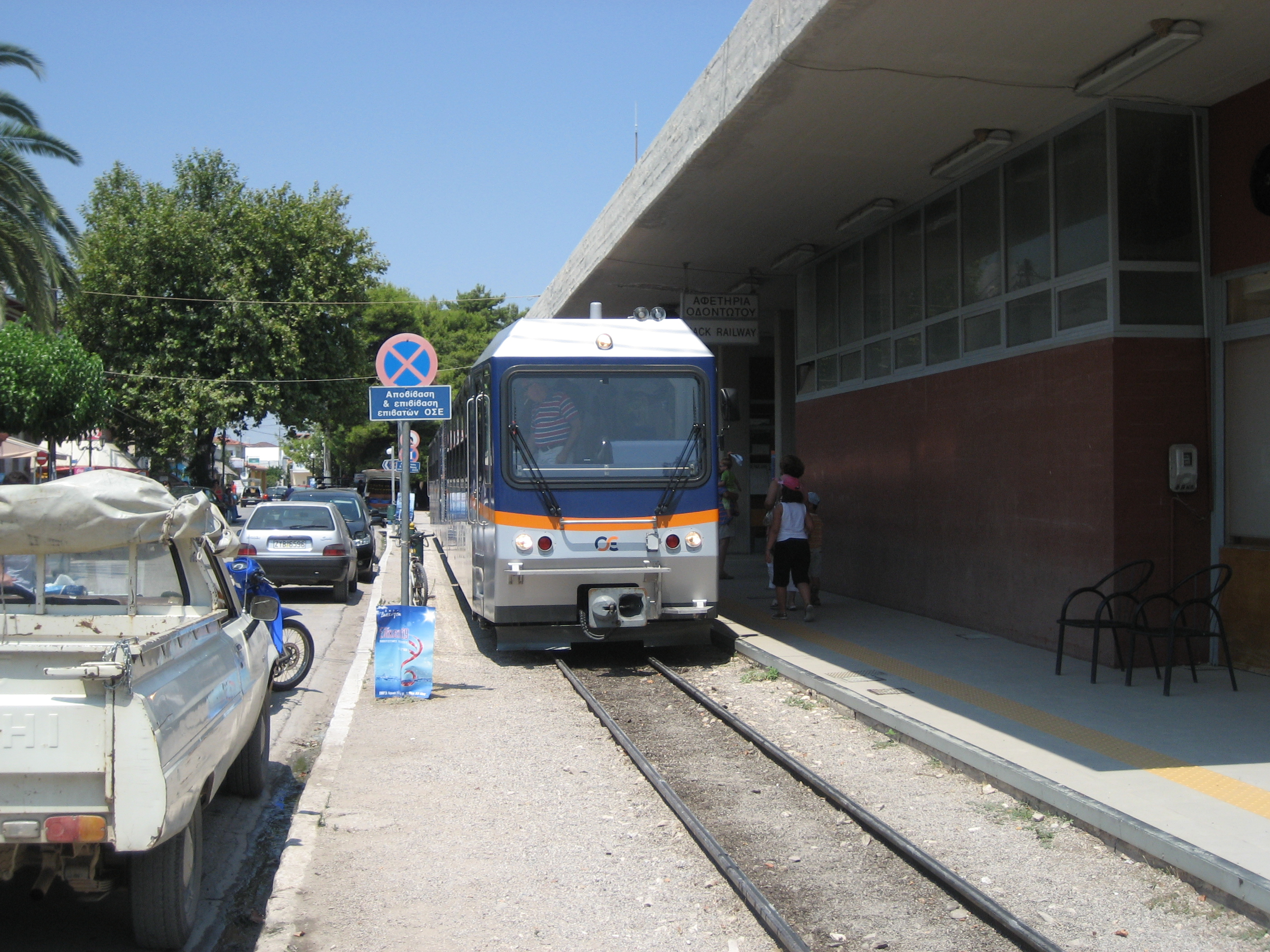
Diakofto-Kalavrita railway station July 2009

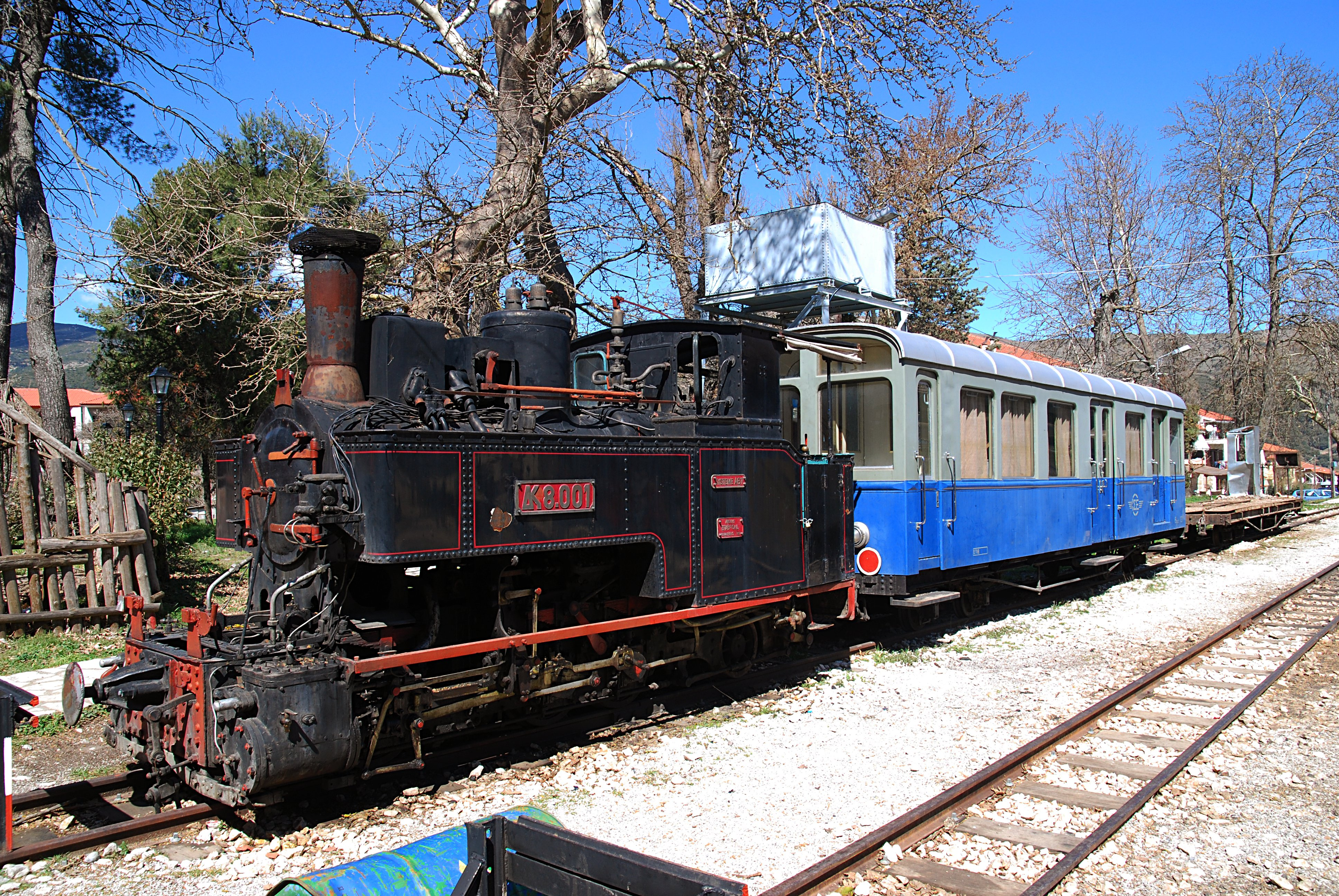
Cail narrow gauge (750 mm) steam locomotive ΔΚ-8001 and observation car ΑΒ ΔΚ-121 of the Diakofto-Kalavryta rack railway .

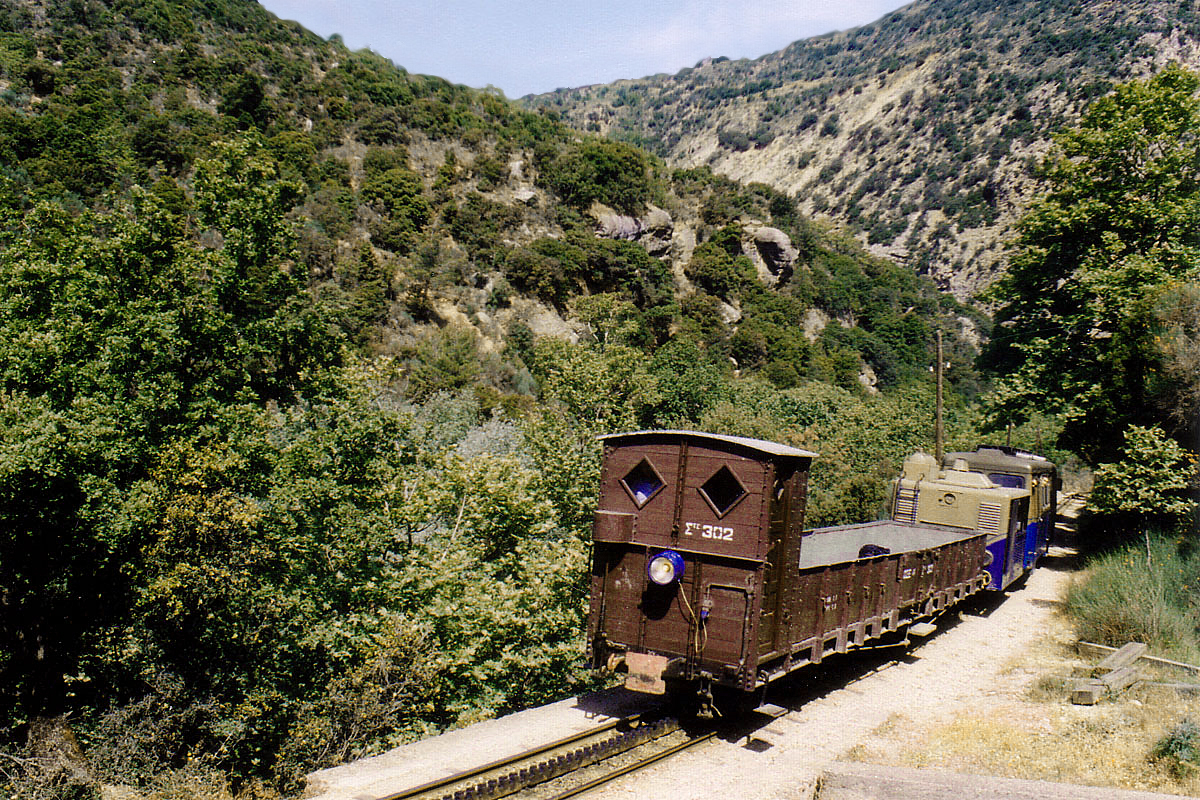
Gorge with mountain creek Vouraikos, January 2002

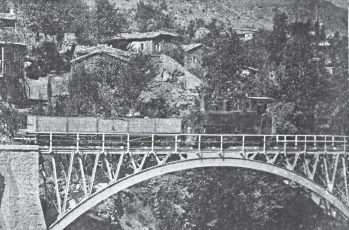
Zachlorou village in Achaia, with Bridge in the foreground.

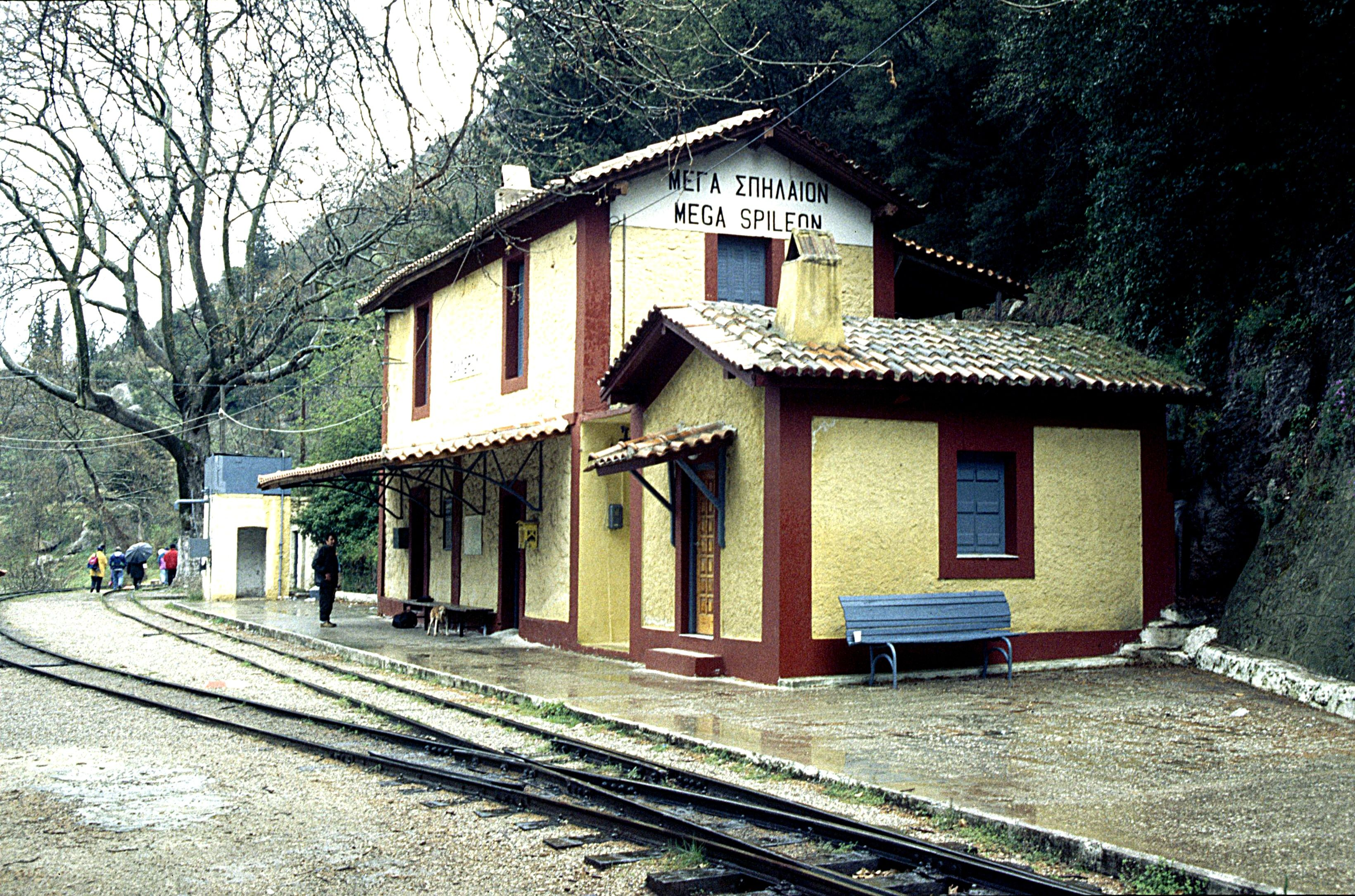
Mega Spileo railway station, May 1997.

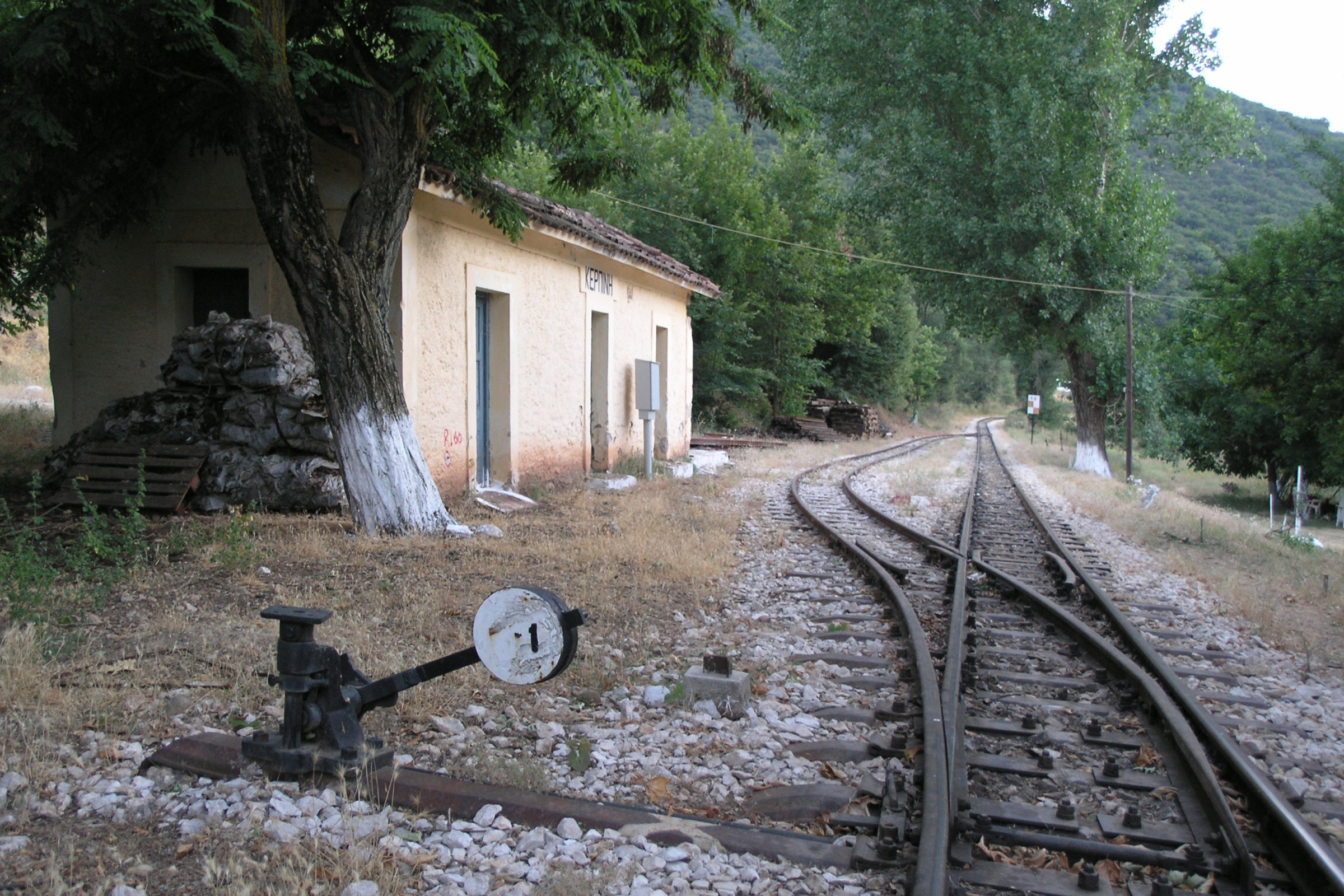
(Now disused) Kerpini railway station, July 2007.
