= Messinian Suburban Railway =

Προαστιακός Μεσσηνίας (transl. Messenia Suburban Railway)

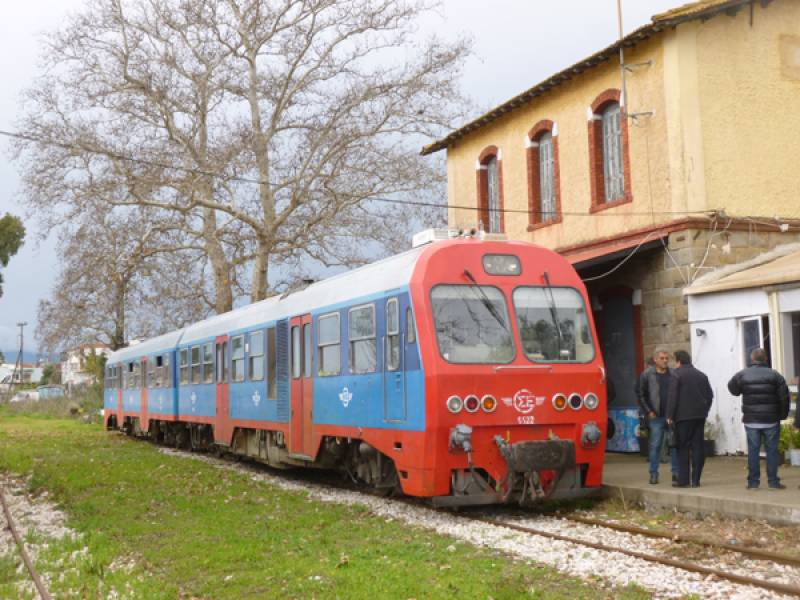

Overview
- Service type: Suburban railway
- Status: Proposed / Historical seasonal operation
- Locale: Messenia, Greece
- Last service: 2016
- Successor: EMSE
- Current operator: —
- Former operators: OSE , TRAINOSE , SPAP
- Ridership: 18.290 weekly
- Daily ridership: 590
- Website: ose.gr emse-rail.gr

Route
- Termini: Kalamata; Messinia, Diavolitsi
- Stops: 18
- Distance travelled: 40km
- Average journey time: 10-15 minutes (Messinia - Kalamata) 40 minutes (Diavolitsi - Kalamata)
- Service frequency: 5-15 minutes
- Lines used: Kalamata - Messinia, Kalamata - Athina

On-board services
- Disabled access: Restricted due to age of rolling stock. G.T.W. are disabled accessible
- Seating arrangements: Suburban train style
- Catering facilities: On the stations Messini,Kalamata,Zevgolatio and Diavolitsi
- Baggage facilities: Overhead racks
- Other facilities: Maintenance depot, Cleaning depot, Refueling spot, Driver's dome, Traffic Control Room

Technical
- Track gauge: 1,000 mm (3 ft 3 3/8 in)
- Electrification: Proposed
- Operating speed: 60km/h (till 2011) 30km/h(2012–2016) on Kalamata - Messini Line 120km/h on Kalamata - Diavolitsi line
- Depot: Northwest of Kalamata

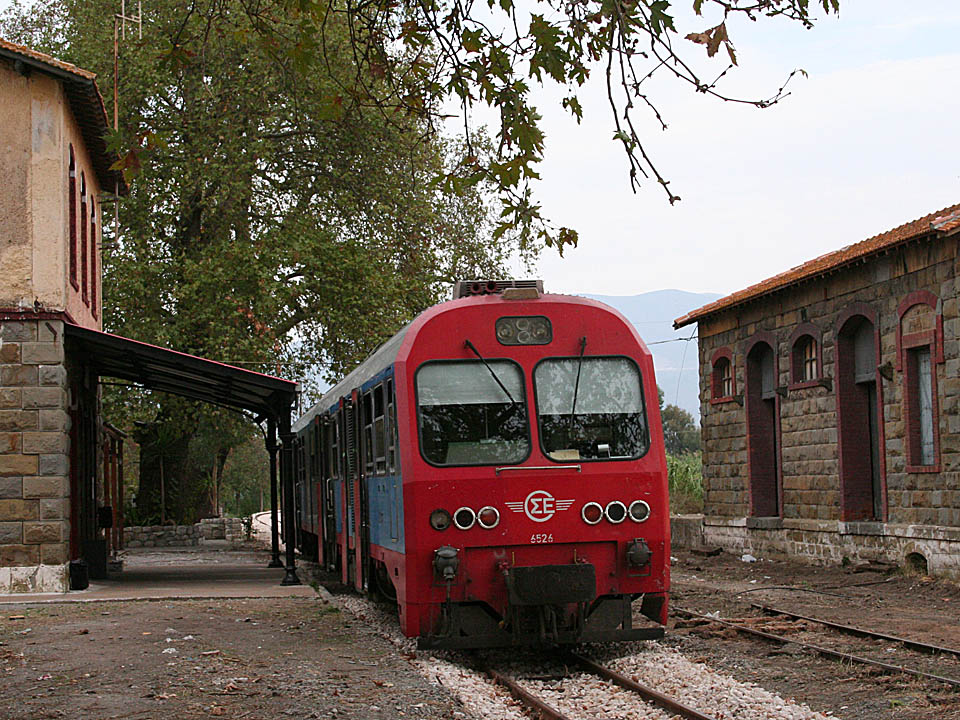
Local train at Messini station in the beginning of October 2007 after reopening of the Kalamata - Messini line 21 September 2007.

The term Messenian Suburban Railway (or Kalamata Suburban Railway) may refer either to the seasonal local railway services that operated between Kalamata and Messini, Greece during the period 2011–2016 after the suspension of the railway system in Peloponnese, or to the proposed development of a new suburban rail network in the Messenia regional unit, or the Suburban Railway that existed till 2011.

== History ==
=== Messini's branch ===
The Asprochoma - Messinia part of the line was built in 1892 but ceased operations the year 1976. Just five years before the suspension of the Metre-gauge railway of Peloponnesos, as a result of the economical crisis, the line ceased operations on 30 January 2011 after it had been re-opened on 21 September 2007. The line was served by tactical rail services till 2011 but after the suspension the suburban railway was active during Christmas period and August or September during the Messinia Fest making it the fourth operational line in Peloponnese with Patras Suburban Railway, Katakolo-Olymbia and Diakopto–Kalavryta railway, all small parts of the abandoned Piraeus, Athens and Peloponnese Railways. The services were named Proastiakos (commuter rail service in Greece) after late 1990s when OSE did a rebranding on the line. During summer of 2025 the railway line from Asprochoma till Messini was removed in order for national road improvement works to be carried out. Aktor, the contractor of the project, stated that they will re place the railway line after the end of the main road works.

=== Korinth - Kalamata line ===
While there was an active railway connecting Athens to Patras from 1884 the then branch line of Korinth - Argos - Nafplio was constructed in 1886. Other parts of the line were constructed during 1890s by private companies but after 1904 when Piraeus, Athens and Peloponnese Railways Company bought those the railway line took the form known to this day.

== Proposed plans ==
=== Reactivation ===
The proposed system would include three lines: Kalamata – Messini, running entirely on Asprochoma - Messenia railway line, Kalamata – Zevgolateio – Diavolitsi, and Kalamata – Kopanaki, utilizing the existing Metre-gauge railway infrastructure of the region of the abandoned Peloponnesian railway. According to feasibility estimates, the reactivation of the Kalamata–Messini line would require an investment of approximately €5 million, with annual operating costs estimated at €700,000. Historical ridership data from 2009 to 2010, when regular service was in operation, recorded 8,878 tickets sold within only 15 days, averaging over 590 passengers per day, indicating a strong level of demand. During the later seasonal operation (2011–2016), daily ridership during peak holiday periods is reported to have exceeded those numbers.

The proposal has gained support from multiple local and regional bodies, including the Friends of the Railway Society of Messenia, the Municipal Council of Kalamata, the current Mayor of Kalamata, and the regional political movement "Prota i Peloponnisos" (Peloponnese First). The Technical Chamber of Greece (TEE) has also expressed formal interest in the project after strong disagreement of the local communities on a study of TEE that wanted to convert the railway line to a bicycle path.

=== Railway Friends Association of Messenia ===
Railway Friends Association of Messenia managed to bring back small routes after 10 years when they managed to restore 2 Kilometres of railway line and 2 trains. On the second event (8 February 2026) the president of the association stated that their goal is to restore 12 kilometres of line till Aris by the end of 2026 so clubs and schools can have field trips with trains. Later on they will try to expand the line by 40 kilometres, reaching Desylas, solely based on volunteers and local communities. Ηe also stated that the line only needs cleaning from herbs and at some places ballast arrangement. Although the main goal stays the same, full reactivation of the suburban railway

=== Switzerland and ELLET ===
Feasibility and viability studies regarding the broader Korinthos–Kalamata metre-gauge corridor were being conducted by the Swiss Embassy in Greece in cooperation with the Hellenic Society for the Environment and Cultural Heritage (ELLET). The results of these studies were publicly presented in late 2025. A meeting between the Swiss embassy, ELLET and the mayor of Kalamata was carried out on 7 December 2025 were they requested 400,000 euros for foundation so specialists from Zurich's university and Metsovio politechnio could carry out a business plan. Swiss experts said that the worth of the infrastructure is estimated to be 5.5 billion euros, while suggesting for the first step reactivation of Kalamata-Diavolitsi and Corinth-Nafplio lines. The mayor stated "The railway is one of our goals as one of the 100 carbon natural European cities."

Due to the previous renovation works carried out between 2009 and 2012 (including station and depot restoration) and the availability of suitable rolling stock, full reactivation works are estimated to require only a few months once approved.

=== EMSE ===
EMSE, standing for Greek Meridian Railways Company, is a railway company that was established in 2024. It promises the full reactivation of Kalamata - Athens line with electrification and battery trains. EMSE is administered by Greek and German entrepreneurs, having its headquarters in Tripoli. The German co-founders are the owners of Nossen-Riesaer Eisenbahn-Compagnie which re-activated unused railway lines in Saxony. There are reports saying that already 35 kilometres of railway line have been restored while in the Facebook page of Railway Friends Association of Messenia are a few uploaded videos of the said restorations. Railway Regulatory Authority of Greece is aware of the company and has not expressed disagreements, although the company is not officially recognised as railway company yet.

=== Official plans ===
On 7/6 it was announced that the Ministry of Infrastructure and Transport will find founding for testing, upgrading and reoperating the line as a suburban railway between Kalamata - Messinia and Kalamata - Diavolitsi as ELLET proposed

== Last routes ==
After 31 January 2011 when the line shut down, almost every year till 2016 there were organised 2-3 special trips from Greek Railways (then OSE) and railway friends association of England, Germany and Athens mainly for the line to be ready for reactivation. At the same time the last seasonal routes took place from 24 December 2015 till 7 January 2016 from Kalamata to Messinia, with tickets costing only 2.50. During September of the same year a storm damaged the switch point outside Kalamata's depot resulting in the suspension of all, even special, routes. With that electrification of stations and train crossing stopped, the seasonal events were moved to Patras and Athens resulting in its continued abandonment.

== Railway Friends Association of Messenia and special events ==
=== Railway Friends Association ===
The Railway Friends Association of Messenia has been active since 1996. Their presence is of great importance as they are the last to take care of the line, they successfully managed to bring back even small routes and events with more to come. The Association also maintained the last trains located in Kalamata's depot and pressuring for reactivation. The Association is volunteer based. As mentioned above SFSM (acronym is in Greek) and is seeking to restore the railway line to Aris by 2026 and thereafter restoration to Desyla.

=== Special events ===
On 31 December 2025, as a symbolic gesture towards the potential reactivation of the Peloponnese railway network, a special ceremonial train operated with the approval of OSE (Hellenic Railways Organisation) after 10 years. The event was organized jointly by the Municipality of Kalamata and the Railway Friends Association of Messenia. The train, carrying Santa Claus, his elves and Christmas gifts, departed from the Kalamata depot and arrived at the Kalamata Central Station, where presents were distributed to children in a festive event celebrating the city's railway heritage and renewal efforts. Afterwards the train did four small routes with passengers on board till Akovitika,and back to the railway station of Kalamata. Technicians of OSE visited the line in early September and they came to the conclusion that the line is in excellent condition. The municipality of Kalamata has started to maintain the railway while SFS of Messinia opened, cleaned and decorated the station's master office after 10 years. A team made by volunteers repainted and cleaned the 2 MAN1 DMUs that were used on the event. An AlCo was also maintained in case of emergency to be used. The event was a success with more than 2,000 people gathering at the station. The president of the community of Kalamata stated that "this was only the start". The event will be held again next Christmas with a bigger route.

On 8 February the Railway Friends Association of Messenia celebrated 30 years and again there were a special train that did a small route, with the same train (MAN 1). Railway enthusiasts from Athens, Germany and England also participated. There are many programmed events coming up in 2026 as the president of SFSM Elias Devis stated. The 2nd ALCo located in Kalamata's depot was moved after 15 years of immobility.

=== Up-Coming events ===
The municipality of Kalamata is organizing a series of cultural activities for the highlighting of the importance of the railway called "The next stop" from 22 to 30 May and requested from Hellenic Train on Sunday 24 May for the train to arrive and stop at the train station while there would be a theatrical play called "waiting for the train". Hellenic Train refused invoking technical and business affairs. The Panhellenic Union of Transportation Workers sent a letter to Christos Dimas, the minister of transportation, in order to step in as it is mentioned clear by the municipality of Kalamata that there will be no passengers thus no danger. Hellenic train nor the prime minister has responded.

It is programmed for the 7th of June to be a route from Asprochoma till Kalamata. The train will be carrying the Swiss Embassy and former ambassador mr. Stephan Estermann with Railway Friends Association of Messenia. The new Swiss ambassador is informed by mr Estermann and supports the reactivation of the railway.

== Rolling stock ==
Class	Type	QTY	Active Units	Manufacturer	Power	Year	Top Speed	Photo	Additional Info	Nickname(s)
OSE Class 6521	MAN 1	21	2	Hellenic Shipyards	305 kW	1990	120 km/h	MAN 1 in Kalamata after 10 years. 31/12/25	All OSE class 6521 were moved to Piraeus depot in 2011 in order to be protected and stored for the future reactivation. All units are still available for operation. Only 3 of them are currently on Kalamata depot	Kalamatiano (The train from Kalamata)
OSE class 4500	G.T.W. 2/6	15	8	Stadler Bombardier	550 kW	2003	115 km/h		All units were moved to Patras were they are serving Patras Suburban Railway to this day	Railbus (even thought they aren't railbuses)
OSE Class 6501	Intercity/ MAN 4	18	0	Hellenic Shipyards	796 kW	1990	120 km/h		They were the first intercity trains in Greece along with OSE class 520 (normal gauge). MAN 4 were serving mainly the routes Kalamata-Patra and Athens - Patra. All units have retired	Red Express
OSE Class A.9201	Locomotive	12	3	ALCO	1178 kW	1967	98 km/h		They were used in passenger, freight and excursion routes. They are known for strength and durability while many call them legends of Messinia. 3 of them are stored in working condition.2 in Kalamata, 1 in museum of railways in Athens	Americans. The blue ALCOS were named Canadians
OSE class A.9401	Shunting Locomotive	20	0	Mitsubishi	237	1967	96 km/h		Only 4 of them remaining in Kalamata's depot. Most of their equipment has been recycled or stolen. While they were purchased as shunting locomotives they were used also on local freight services, mostly in Ancient Olymbia-Pyrgos line. The mitsubishi 9413 was also used in the excursion ride of 13/11/2010	Oranges

== Video footage ==
Luckily there are many videos on YouTtube mostly between the years 2005-2010 which are showing the routes even on cab drives (click the reference to see the video)

Kalamata - Corinth

Athens (Piraeus) - Patras - Olympia

Messini - Kalamata

cab ride of the festive train 31 December 2025

== See also ==
- Piraeus, Athens and Peloponnese Railways
- Hellenic Railways Organisation
