= Piraeus Railway Works =

Rolling stock manufacturer

- Type: Subsidiary
- Industry: Rail transport
- Founded: 1813; 213 years ago
- Headquarters: Thessaloniki, Greece
- Area served: Worldwide
- Products: Locomotives; High-speed trains Intercity and commuter trains Trams; People movers Signalling systems

Early development of railway transport in Greece involved a number of different companies, which had created their own workshops for maintenance and constructions. The most important were Railway Works in Piraeus, originally operated by Athens-Piraeus Railways (SAP, which later transformed into Hellenic Electric Railways, EIS), and Piraeus, Athens and Peloponnese Railways (SPAP, forerunner of OSE), which, in addition to maintenance, repair and rebuilding, have entirely constructed a significant number of railroad cars, mostly between 1880 and 1960. Other noteworthy constructions included 12 electric rail cars in 1923 (on Belgian designs) and the rebuilding of rolling stock destroyed by allied bombing in 1944, a small number of electric trams (clearly copies of a Dick Kerr model) built by EIS in 1939, a small locomotive built by SPAP in 1953 for the Diakopto-Kalavryta rack railway (on French designs) and one of Greece's first Diesel locomotives, designed and built by SPAP in 1961.

The "crown jewel" of the Piraeus Works was the royal wagon, built in 1888 as a present to King George I of Greece. The luxurious vehicle was so admired, that an entire engineering project was organized in order to transport and present it in the 1888 "Olympia Fair" held in Zappeion. It survives to date, exhibited in the Railway Museum of Athens.

== See also ==
- OSE (overview of railway development in Greece)
