= Kato Zachlorou =

Kato Zachlorou Κάτω Ζαχλωρού
- Community
- Location within Greece
- Coordinates: 38°5′N 22°9′E
- Country: Greece
- Administrative region: West Greece
- Regional unit: Achaea
- Municipality: Kalavryta
- Municipal unit: Kalavryta
- Elevation: 655 m (2,149 ft)

Population (2021)
  - Community: 53
- Time zone: UTC+2 (EET)
  - Summer (DST): UTC+3 (EEST)
- Postal code: 250 03
- Vehicle registration: AX

Kato Zachlorou (Greek: Κάτω Ζαχλωρού) is a village and a community in eastern Achaea, Greece. It is built on a mountain slope on the left bank of the river Vouraikos, which forms a narrow gorge. The community consists of the villages Kato Zachlorou and Ano Zachlorou, and the Mega Spilaio monastery. It is 11 km (7 miles) south of Diakopto, and 9 km (6 miles) northeast of Kalavryta. The narrow gauge Diakofto–Kalavryta Railway runs through the village.

== Population ==
Year	Population
1981	96
1991	81
2001	101
2011	53
2021	49

== See also ==
- List of settlements in Achaea
