= Corinth railway station (old) =

Former railway station in Corinth, Greece

Coordinates: 37.9386°N 22.9394°E

Κόρινθος Korinthos
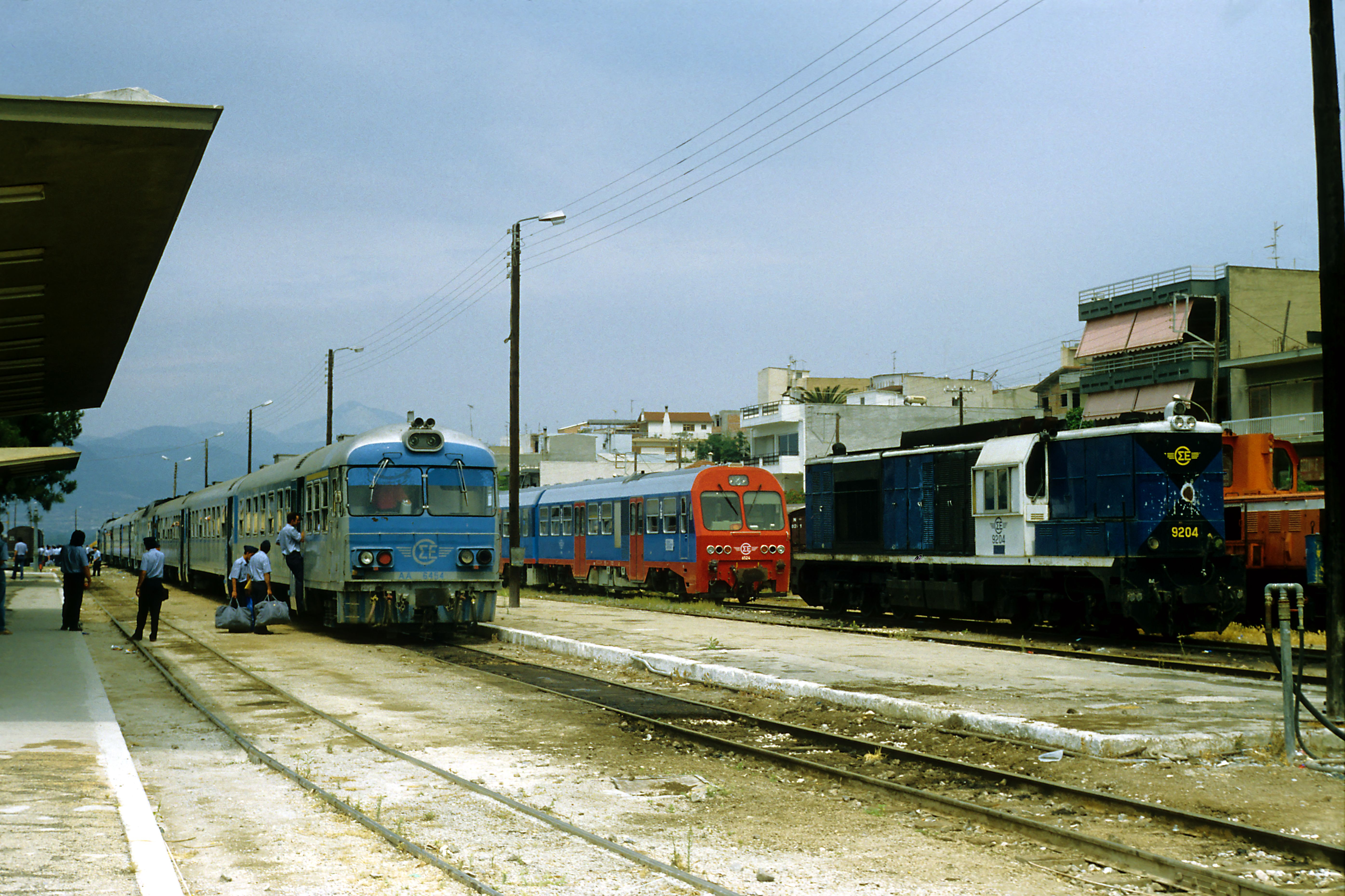
- Corinth old station, June 1992

General information
- Location: Corinth; Corinthia; Greece
- Owner: GAIAOSE
- Line: Piraeus–Patras railway
- Train operators: TrainOSE

Construction
- Structure type: at-grade

Other information
- Website: http://www.ose.gr/en/

History
- Opened: July 1884
- Closed: 9 July 2007
- Rebuilt: 1955.
Location
- Location within Greece

The former Corinth railway station (Greek: Σιδηροδρομικός Σταθμός Κορίνθου, Sidirodromikos Stathmos Korinthou) was on the former metre gauge Piraeus, Athens and Peloponnese Railways (Piraeus–Patras railway).

The Piraeus, Athens and Peloponnese Railways reached Corinth in July 1884. Some parts of the station date from 1916 and 1929, and the main building, designed by architect Anthony Dragoymi (Greek: Αντώνη Δραγούμη), was built in 1955. The station closed to regular traffic on 9 July 2007, having been replaced by a new station on the new line. It continued to be used by tourist excursion trains, but newer road development and -resurfacing efforts, as well as private building access roads, have permanently covered the rails in both directions.

== Gallery ==
Photo of Corinth Railway Station c. 1910
