= Piraeus, Athens and Peloponnese Railways =

Railway company in Greece, 1882–1962

Overview
- Main regions: Attica, Peloponnese
- Stations called at: 159
- Locale: Attica, Peloponnese
- Dates of operation: 1882–1962
- Successor: Hellenic State Railways

Technical
- Track gauge: 1,000 mm (3 ft 3 3/8 in) metre gauge
- Electrification: No
- Length: 750km
- Operating speed: up to 120km/h (1990)

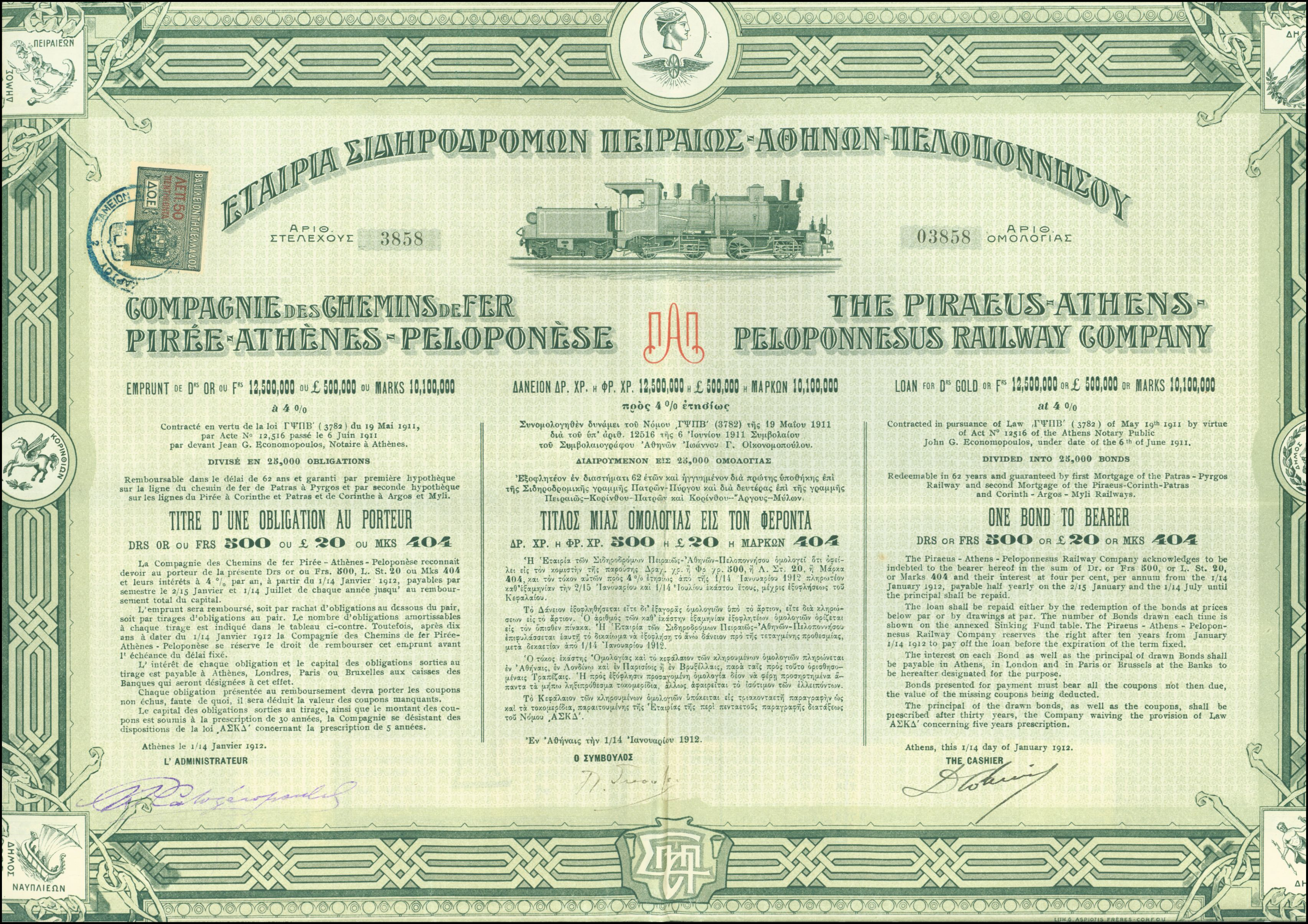
Bond of the Piraeus, Athens and Peloponnese Railways, issued in January 1912

Piraeus, Athens and Peloponnese Railways or SPAP (Greek: Σιδηρόδρομοι Πειραιώς-Αθηνών-Πελοποννήσου "Siderodromi Pireos Athinon Peloponisou" or Σ.Π.Α.Π. (S.P.A.P.); French: Chemin de fer du Pirée-Athènes-Peloponèse) was a Greek railway company founded in 1882 as a private company, owning and operating the 1,000 mm (3 ft 3 3/8 in) (metre gauge) Piraeus–Patras railway line connecting Piraeus and Athens to Peloponnese. The company was nationalized in 1954 and formally absorbed by the Hellenic State Railways in 1962.

The name "Spap" originates from the Greek initials of the railway company.

== History ==
Kalamata station, circa 1910

Corinth station, ca 1910

The first line section between Piraeus, Athens and Elefsis was completed in 1884. The line reached Corinth in 1885 and Patras in 1887. In the meantime, an eastern branch from Corinth reached Argos and Nafplion in 1886. The western branch reached Pyrgos and finally Kyparissia in 1902. SPAP also acquired the line between Myloi (near Argos) and Kalamata via Tripoli, from the bankrupt Southern Greece Railways (Sidirodromoi Mesimbrinis Ellados). The two routes to Kalamata, via Patras and via Tripoli, merged at Zevgolatio.

Short branches were also constructed to serve important towns: Argos-Nafplion, Lefktro-Megalopolis, Kavasila-Vartholomio-Kyllini, Vartholomio-Kyllini Spa (Loutra), Pyrgos to Ancient Olympia, Asprochoma-Messini and, much later (1954), Isthmos-Loutraki. Diakofto Kalavrita Railway was also constructed by SPAP, but at a smaller gauge (750 mm or 2 ft 5 1/2 in).

The line from Piraeus to Corinth was 99 km, from Corinth to Kalamata via Tripoli 236 km and from Corinth to Zevgolatio via Patras and Pyrgos 347 km. The total length of the system with the branch lines was 731 km. In 1929 SPAP acquired the Heraklion-Lavrion section of Athens-Lavrion Railway, formerly operated by Attica Railways, and constructed a link from Kato Liossia (today Agioi Anargyroi) to Heraklion, to connect the Lavrion line to its network (1931). Passenger services on this branch were suspended in 1957 and it was cut off from the rest of the network in 1962, due to the construction of the Athens-Thessaloniki highway.

During the Axis occupation of Greece in WW2, and especially during the withdrawal of German troops in 1944, the network and the rolling stock suffered extensive damages both by the German army and by Greek resistance groups. Repair of SPAP assets was time-consuming and expensive. Damaged rolling stock was mainly repaired at Piraeus Engine Sheds. Normal levels of service resumed at about 1948 with the exception of the destroyed bridge of Achladokampos (between Argos and Tripoli), which was rebuilt by OSE in 1974.

In 1951 SPAP absorbed the small Pyrgos-Katakolo Railway. In 1953 SPAP absorbed Northwestern Greece Railways (SDBE), which operated a metre gauge line from Kryoneri to Messolongi and Agrinion.

In 1920 SPAP was briefly nationalized as part of the Hellenic State Railways but it became an independent company again two years later. Due to high debts, SPAP came under government control in 1939-1940 and was formally nationalized again in 1954. In 1962 the company was absorbed by the Hellenic State Railways.

== Suspension ==
The economic crisis in Greece led to the suspension of all passenger and freight services on the metre gauge railway system in the Peloponnese in 2011.

== Current situation ==
It is impossible services will resume fully on the 1,000 mm (3 ft 3 3/8 in) (metre gauge) line onto the next years, as there are now section gaps on the route caused by modern infrastructure, although some privately chartered services occasionally run on short sections of line. A short section through the port city of Patras remains open as a suburban railway lines P1 and P2.

However as part of the P.A.Th.E./P. project, the former section of track between Athens and Kiato has been rebuilt to standard gauge and electrified. The Athens Airport–Patras railway, opened in 2007 until Kiato, is served by the Athens Suburban Railway. In 2019 this section of line was extended to Aigio. and eventually Patras, providing a double-track standard gauge rail connection between Patras and Athens. An extension from Patras to Kalamata via Pyrgos was also planned but due to the COVID-19 pandemic all progress froze .

As of 2025, progress has been made regarding the potential reopening of the narrow-gauge railway. Discussions between the Embassy of Switzerland and the Greek Society for the Environment and Cultural Heritage have led to the initiation of the necessary feasibility and restoration studies, which are now underway with the approval of the Hellenic Ministry of Infrastructure and Transport.

Two official meetings have taken place in Nafplio, on the 14th and 15 March 2024, followed by a third meeting on the 5th and 6 December 2024.

Recently, when the Swiss Ambassador to Greece, Mr. Stefan Estermann, together with Professor Bernd Scholl of the Swiss Federal Institute of Technology (ETH Zurich), walked along parts of the disused railway line. They expressed their support for its restoration, highlighting the railway's historical, cultural, and environmental significance. "At times along the way, we had the impression that all it needed was to cut down a few bushes and the trains could start running again. Of course, we know that the situation is not the same everywhere. However, we realized one thing: the existing infrastructure already has enormous value in itself. If the line had to be built from scratch in the pristine landscape, hundreds of millions of euros would have to be spent. Therefore, it would be financially irresponsible and pointless to not utilize this infrastructure and leave it to decay".

Since 10 June 2025, there has been an interest expressed in the Kalamata municipal council to restore the Kalamata–Messinia part of the line under the name Messinian Suburban Railway, connecting the port of Kalamata, Kalamata International Airport, the Courts and Messinia.

On 31 December 2025, as a symbolic gesture towards the potential reactivation of the Peloponnese railway network, a special ceremonial train is scheduled to operate with the approval of OSE (Hellenic Railways Organisation).The event is organized jointly by the Municipality of Kalamata and the Railway Friends Association of Messenia.The train, carrying Santa Claus, his elves and Christmas gifts, will depart from the Kalamata depot and arrive at the Kalamata Central Station, where presents will be distributed to children in a festive event celebrating the city’s railway heritage and renewal efforts.

== Rolling stock ==
=== Steam locomotives ===
Between 1883 and 1962 SPAP used 128 locomotives of 25 different types.

Photo	Class	Numbers	Type	Quantity	Manufacturer	Serial Nos.	Year	Power	Notes
	Α	1-4	0-4-0T	4	Krauss		1883		
	Α	5	0-4-0T	1	Krauss		1885		
	Α1-6		0-6-0T	6	Couillet		1888		
	Β	101-109	2-4-0T	8	Krauss		1883		
	Β	111–114	2-4-0T	4	Krauss		1888		
	Βς	151–155	2-4-0T	5	Henschel		1912		
	Γ	201-205	2-6-0T	5	Krauss				
	Γ	261–268	2-6-0T	8	Couillet		1890		Ex Myloi—Kalamata railway, later renumbered 211–218
	Δ	251-252	2-6-0T	2	Krauss		1886		rebuilt as 4-6-0T in 1888
	Δ	253-254	4-6-0T	2	Krauss		1888		rebuilt as 4-6-0T in 1888
	Δ (Δα)	101–108	2-8-2	8	Vulcan Iron Works		1947	644 kW (864 hp)	USATC S-118 copies
	Δ (Δι)	111–120	2-8-2	10	Breda		1951	770 hp (574 kW)	
	Ε	151–152	4-4-0T	2	Krauss		1887		
	Ες	701–702	2-8-0	2	Borsig		1912		
	Ες	711–713	2-8-0	3	Borsig		1914		
	Ες	721–725	2-8-0	5	Linke-Hofmann		1925		
	Ες	726–728	2-8-0	3	Henschel & Sohn		1936		
	Ζ	500	2-6-0T	1	Vassiliadis Works		1900/1929		
	Ζ	501–517	2-6-0T	17	SACM Grafenstaden		1890–1901		
	Ζ	518–526	2-6-0T	9	Krauss		1902–1906		
	Ζς	530–533	2-6-0T	4	Krauss		1911		
	Ζς	540–542	2-6-0T	3	Krauss		1926		Ex Attica Railways
	Η	551–552	2-6-0T	2	St. Léonard		1891		
	Θ	601–603	2-8-0	3	Krauss				
	Ι	651–660	2-4-0T	10	Société Belge		1889		Ex Myloi—Kalamata railway
	Κ	701	0-6-0T	1	Krauss		1889		Ex Myloi—Kalamata railway, originality Kalamata Harbour
	Μ	801–803	0-4-4-0	3	Krauss		1908		Mallet locomotives
	ΔΚ	1–5	0-6-2RT (750 mm (2 ft 5 1/2 in))	5	Cail/MPR		1891/1954		
	ΔΚ	11	0-6-RT (750 mm (2 ft 5 1/2 in))	1	Krupp		1891		

=== Diesel multiple units ===
SPAP introduced diesel railcars and multiple units early in 1937. They reduced journey times and offered good passenger facilities.

Class	Type	QTY	Manufacturer	Model	Power	Year	Photo	Additional Info
ΑΚ210	Β-2	8	DWF/MAN			1937		
3ΑΚ1000	B-2-2-B	7	Esslingen			1956–1957		
3ΑΚ640	B-2-2-B	13	DeDietrich			1950–1952		
2ΑΚ420	B-2-B	8	Linke-Hofmann			1937		
ΑΔΚ01 (750mm)	B-B+2+2-2 rack	3	Billiard			1958		Used on Diakopto–Kalavryta railway
ΑΚ2Χ155	1A-A1	3	Breda			1952		
OSE Class 6521	MAN 1	21	Hellenic Shipyards		305 kW	1990		All units were moved to Piraeus trainyard in order to be maintained and ready for future usage. Only 3 of them are in Kalamata depot all in working condition. All 3 of them were used at the event of 31st Dec 2025
OSE class 4500	G.T.W. 2/6	15				2003		All units were moved to Patras were they are serving Patras Suburban Railway
OSE Class 6501	MAN 4, Intercity	18	Hellenic Shipyards		796 kW	1990	Pirgos IC 6501 DMU	

=== Diesel locomotives ===
Class	Type	QTY	Manufacturer	Model	Power	Year	Photo
DBς320.01	1-B	1	Piraeus Works		320 HP	1961	

== See also ==
- Diakofto Kalavrita Railway
- Athens–Lavrion Railway

== General references ==
- Durrant, A. E. (1972) [1966]. The Steam locomotives of Eastern Europe. Newton Abbot, Devon, UK: David and Charles. ISBN 0-7153 4077 8.
