= Karditsa railway station =

Railway station in Greece

Καρδίτσα Karditsa
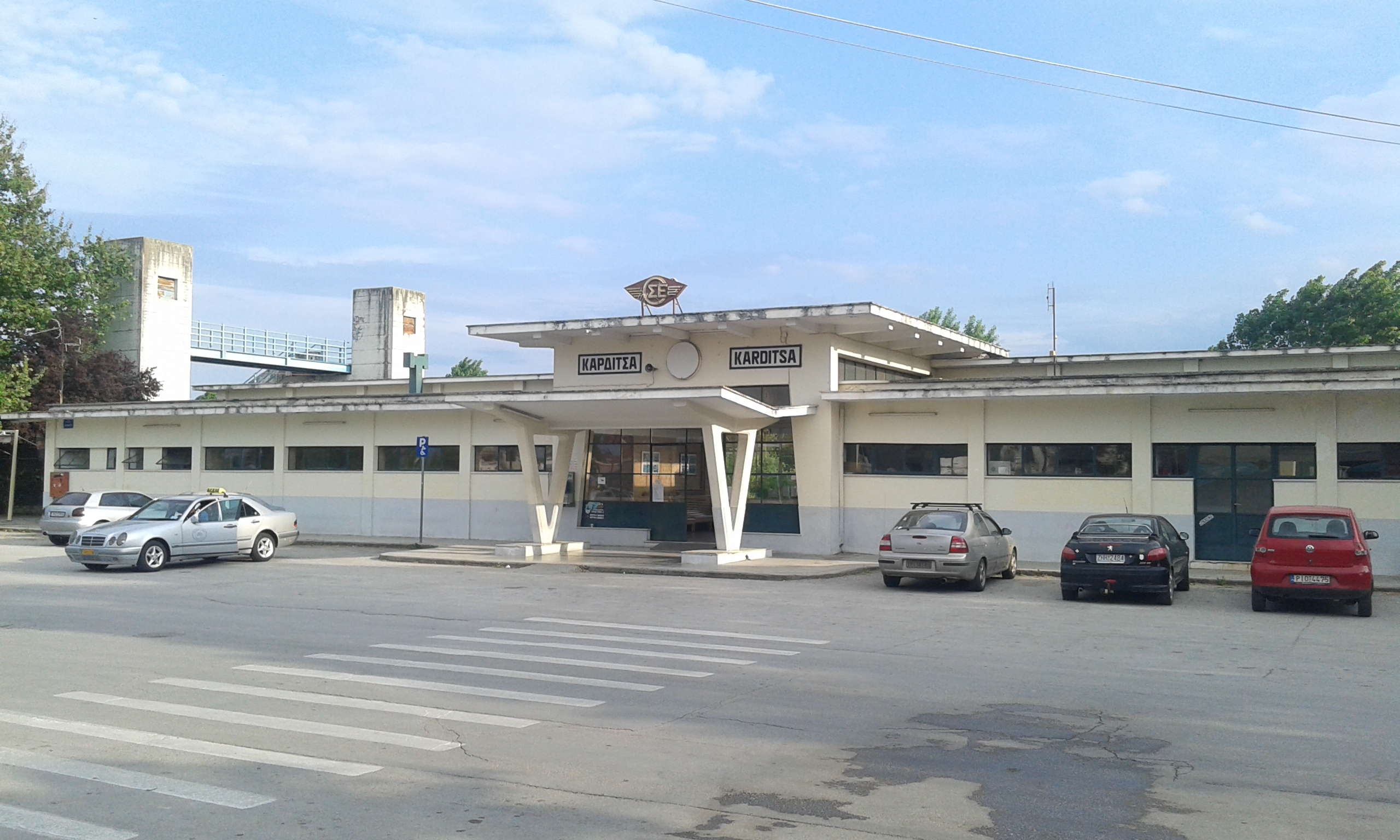
- Karditsa station forecourt, May 2016

General information
- Location: 431 00, Karditsa; Greece
- Coordinates: 39°21′14″N 21°54′53″E
- Owner: GAIAOSE
- Operator: Hellenic Train
- Line: Palaiofarsalos–Kalambaka railway
- Platforms: 3
- Tracks: 3
- Train operators: Hellenic Train

Construction
- Structure type: at-grade
- Platform levels: 1
- Parking: Yes
- Architectural style: Modernist New Objectivity (architecture)

Other information
- Status: Staffed
- Website: http://www.ose.gr/en/

History
- Opened: 16 June 1886; 140 years ago
- Rebuilt: 1954-59 2001
- Electrified: No
- Original company: Thessaly Railways

Services
Preceding station	Hellenic Train	Following station
Sofades towards Athens	C2 Athens-Kalambaka (rail replacement bus)	Fanari towards Kalambaka
Sofades towards Palaiofarsalos	G3 Palaiofarsalos-Kalambaka	Fanari towards Kalambaka

Former service
Preceding station	Thessaly Railways	Following station
Sofades towards Volos	Volos–Kalambaka	Stasis Issari towards Kalambaka
Location
- Location within Greece

Karditsa railway station (Greek: Σιδηροδρομικός σταθμός Καρδίτσας, romanized: Sidirodromikós stathmós Karditsa) is a railway station that serves the city of Karditsa, Thessaly, Greece. Located 1.3 kilometres (0.81 mi) south of the centre of Karditsa, the station opened by the Thessaly Railways, (now part of OSE). Today Hellenic Train operates 11 daily Regional trains between Kalambaka, Athens, Thessaloniki, Larissa and Palaiofarsalos.

== History ==
The station open 16 June 1886 by the Thessaly Railways. The original station building (and the line) was designed by the Italian Evaristo de Chirico, (father of Giorgio de Chirico), however, this building was destroyed in the 1954 earthquake, and was rebuilt at the end of the same decade. The line was authorised by the Greek government under the law AMH’/22.6.1882. soon after the liberation of Central Greece from the Ottomans.

After the First World War, the Greek state planned the ambitious construction of several new rail lines and links, including a standard gauge line from Kalambaka onto Kozani and then Veroia creating a conversion of the route from Volos to Kalambaka (though Karditsa) on standard gauge. In 1927, the relevant decisions were made; starting in 1928, work was carried out on the construction of the new line from Kalambaka. But a year later, it was clear that the project would exceed the estimated costs many times over. In 1932, the construction work was stopped and remains unfinished.

At 16:02 (UTC+3) 30 April 1954, a 6.7–7.0 M_{w} earthquake hit the Thessalian Plain, in which Karditsa sits. More than 28,000 structures were damaged or destroyed. including the original station building, which had to be rebuilt later that same decade, in the more modernist style. In 1955 Thessaly Railways was absorbed into Hellenic State Railways (SEK).

Freight traffic declined sharply when the state-imposed monopoly of OSE for the transport of agricultural products and fertilisers ended in the early 1990s. Many small stations of the network with little passenger traffic were closed down, especially on the mainline section and between Karditsa and Kalampaka. In 2001 the section between Kalampaka and Palaiofarsalos was converted from Narrow gauge (1000 mm) to standard gauge (1435 mm) and physically connected at Palaiofarsalos with the mainline from Athens to Thessaloniki. Since to upgrade; however, travel times improved and the unification of rail gauge allowed direct services, even InterCity services, to link Volos and Kalambaka with Athens and Thessaloniki.

In 2001 the infrastructure element of OSE was created, known as GAIAOSE; it would henceforth be responsible for the maintenance of stations, bridges and other elements of the network, as well as the leasing and the sale of railway assists. In 2005, TrainOSE was created as a brand within OSE to concentrate on rail services and passenger interface. In 2009, with the Greek debt crisis unfolding OSE's Management was forced to reduce services across the network. Timetables were cut back and routes closed as the government-run entity attempted to reduce overheads. In 2015 a 15-year-old child was airlifted to hospital after being electrocuted at the station.

In 2017 OSE's passenger transport sector was privatised as TrainOSE; currently, a wholly owned subsidiary of Ferrovie dello Stato Italiane infrastructure, including stations, remained under the control of OSE. In July 2022, the station began being served by Hellenic Train, the rebranded TranOSE

On the 5 September 2023, Storm Daniel triggered largescale flooding in Thessaly. The rail infrastructure was badly affected in the region, cutting on both Regional and Intercity routes as significant parts of the infrastructure were washed away. OSE engineers were on the ground in the worst affected areas Domokos, Doxaras, and Paleofarsalos to assess the extent of the damage, and prepare detailed reports, and seek financial assistance from the European Union. 50 km (31 mi) of tracks was completely destroyed

Repairing the extensive damage, was estimated at between 35 and 45 million euros. OSE managing director, Panagiotis Terezakis, spoke of reconstruction works reaching 50 million euros, confirming at the same time that there will be no rail traffic in the effected sections of the network for at least a month. The devastation goes beyond the tracks and signalling, affecting costly equipment such as the European Train Control System (ETCS), which enhances rail safety. The line from Palaiofarsalos–Kalambaka was damaged, with extensive work needed to repair the line and resume services As a result services between Palaiofarsalos and Kalambaka remain suspended across Thessaly’s coast until the track is repaired, with a rail-replacement bus in operation.

In August 2025, the Greek Ministry of Infrastructure and Transport confirmed the creation of a new body, Greek Railways (Greek: Σιδηρόδρομοι Ελλάδος, romanized: Ellinikí Sidiródromi Monoprósopi) to assume responsibility for rail infrastructure, planning, modernisation projects, and rolling stock across Greece. Previously, these functions were divided among several state-owned entities: OSE, which managed infrastructure; ERGOSÉ, responsible for modernisation projects; and GAIAOSÉ, which owned stations, buildings, and rolling stock. OSE had overseen both infrastructure and operations until its vertical separation in 2005. Rail safety has been identified as a key priority. The merger follows the July approval of a Parliamentary Bill to restructure the national railway system, a direct response to the Tempi accident of February 2023, in which 43 people died after a head-on collision.

== Facilities ==
The Station has waiting rooms on platform 1. There is a footbridge via stairs or lift from platform 1 to platform 2/3. The station is staffed, with ticket purchasing facilities and toilets, with Luggage storage available.

== Services ==
In August 2009, TrainOSE S.A. proceeded to a drastic cutback of passenger services on Thessaly lines. As of Spring 2020, There are ten (five in each direction) Regional express services on Palaiofarsalos-Kalambaka Line. In addition, there is one Regional express train to Athens from Kalambaka and back (884/885).

Until 2023 the station was served by direct lines to the rest of Greece via Palaiofarsalos, served by intercity trains to Athens, Palaiofarsalos Larissa and Thessaloniki. Previously Thessaly Railways operated a narrow gauge service to Volos. However no trains currently (2026) call at this station due to track renewal work.

Note: It also announced in September 2023 the resumption of the rail replacement bus connecting Palaiofarsalos to Kalambaka, due to damage coursed by a mega-storm in September.

== Station layout ==
Ground level	Customer service	Exit/Tickets
Level; Ε1	Side platform, doors will open on the right
Level; Ε1	Platform 1	towards Larissa (Sofades →
Level; Ε1	Platform 2	← towards Kalambaka (Fanari
Level; Ε1	Side platform, doors will open on the right/left
Level; Ε1	Platform 3	Not in use

== Gallery ==
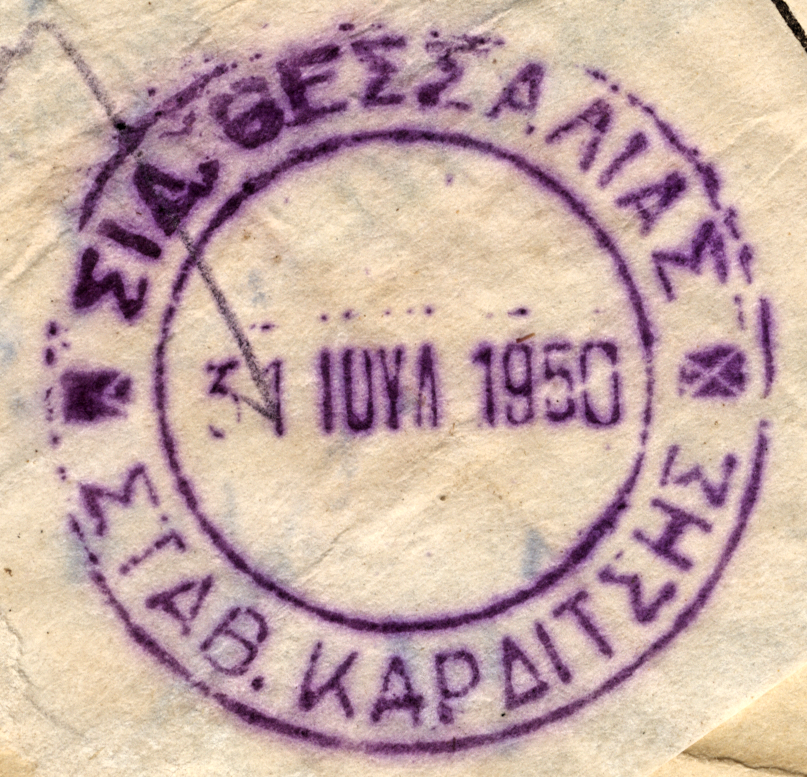
Karditsa train station stamp 1950

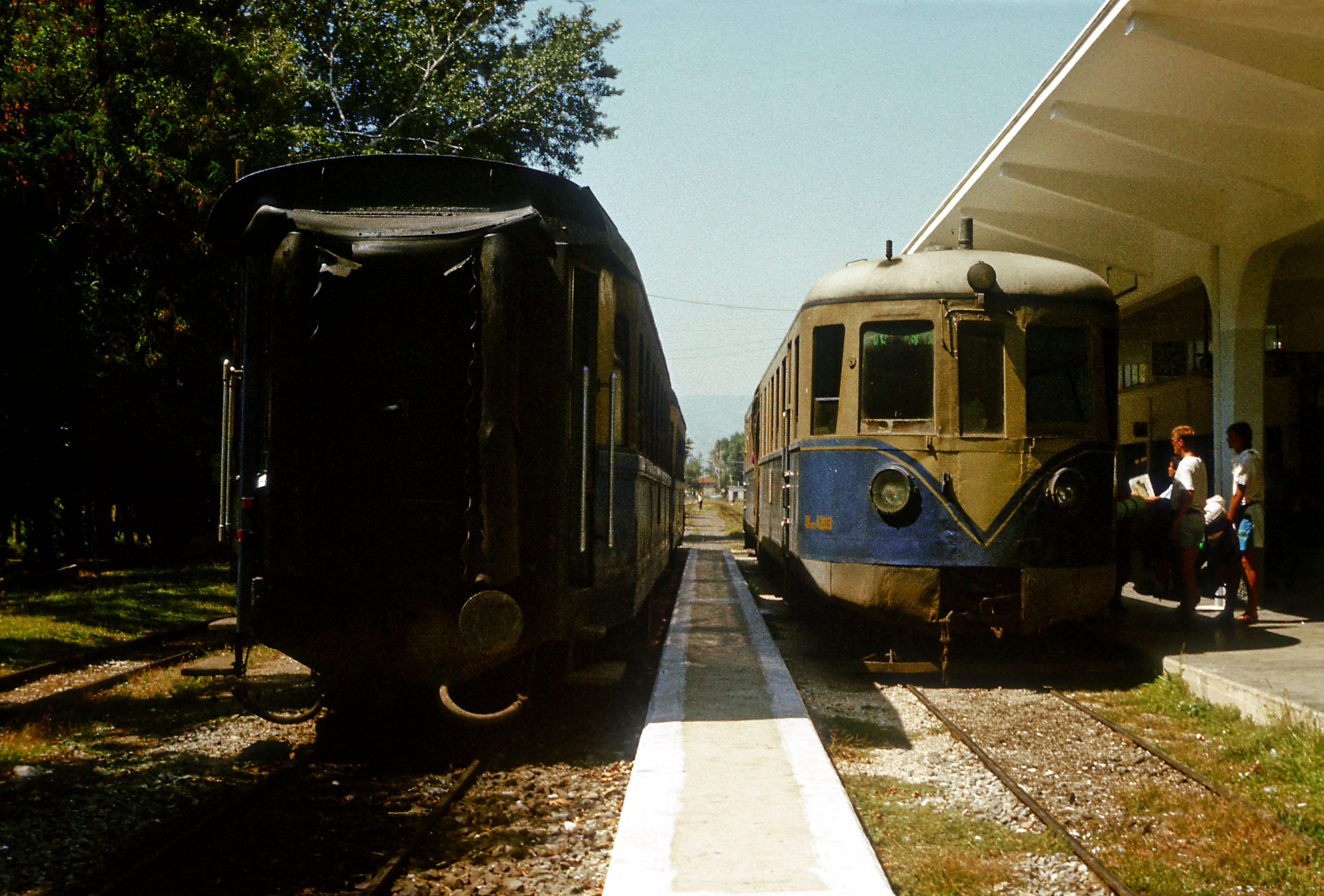
The station before its conversion to standard gauge September 1990

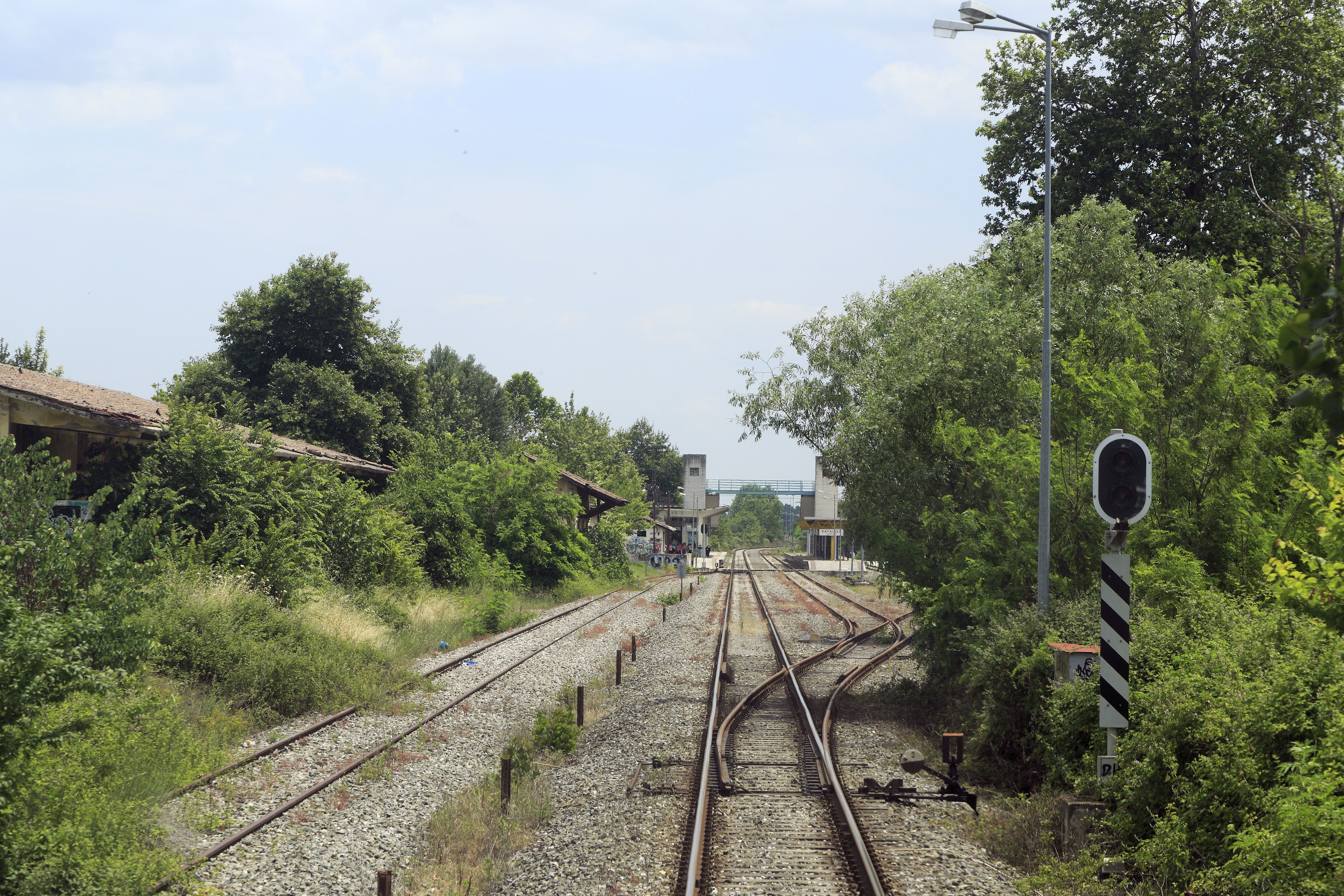
The station approaches, looking east towards Sofades May 2016

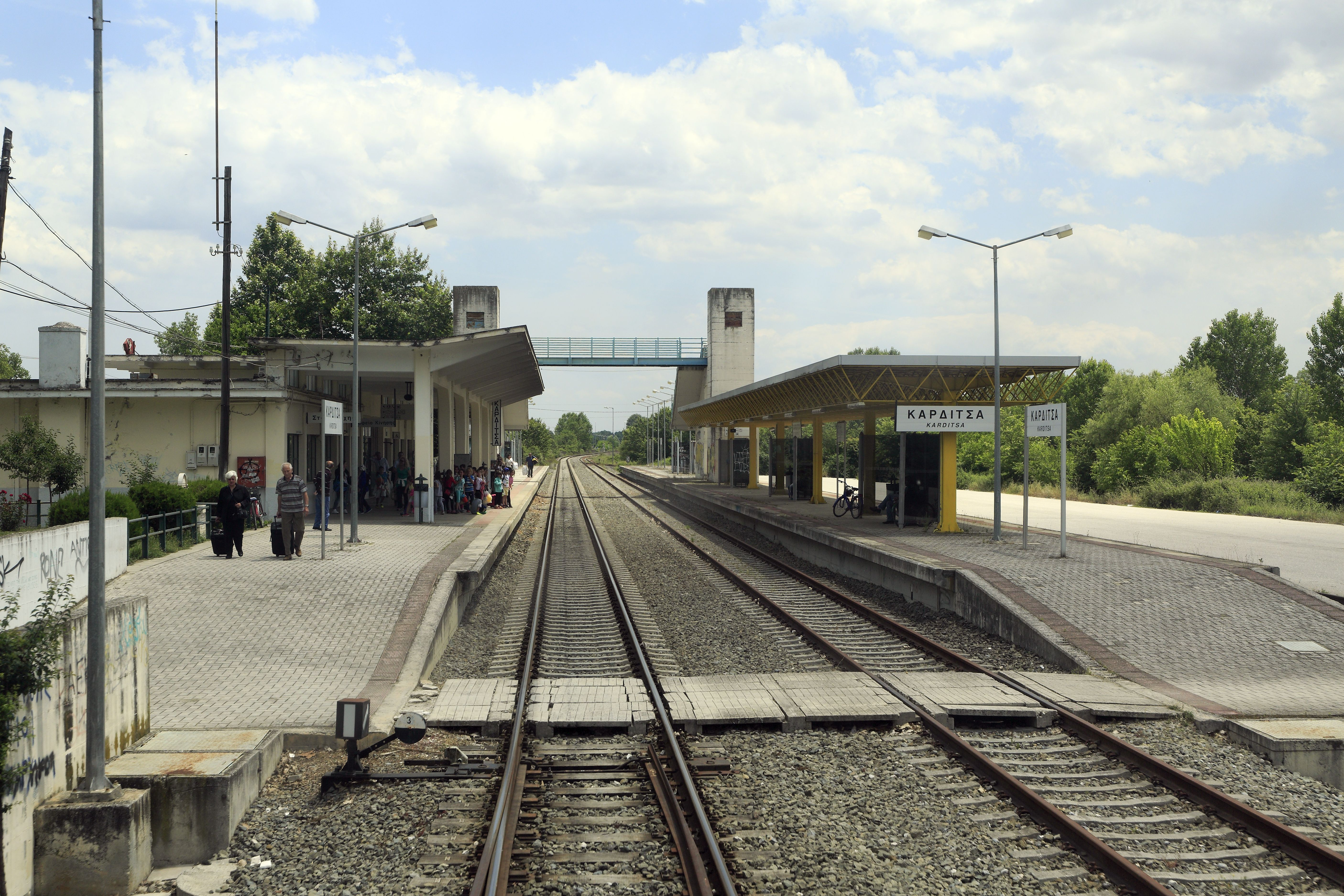
The station, with both platforms in view May 2016
