= Fanari railway station =

Railway station in the Karditsa regional unit, Thessaly, Greece

Φανάρι Fanari

General information
- Location: Kompelos 431 00, Karditsa; Greece
- Coordinates: 39°25′01″N 21°49′03″E
- Owner: GAIAOSE
- Operator: Hellenic Train
- Line: Palaiofarsalos–Kalambaka railway
- Platforms: 1
- Tracks: 1
- Train operators: Hellenic Train

Construction
- Structure type: at-grade
- Platform levels: 1
- Parking: Yes
- Cycle facilities: No

Other information
- Status: Unstaffed
- Website: http://www.ose.gr/en/

History
- Opened: 16 June 1886
- Rebuilt: 2001
- Electrified: No

Services
Preceding station	Hellenic Train	Following station
Karditsa towards Athens	C2 Athens-Kalambaka (rail replacement bus)	Magoula Karditsa towards Kalambaka
Karditsa towards Palaiofarsalos	G3 Palaiofarsalos-Kalambaka	Magoula Karditsa towards Kalambaka

Former service
Preceding station	Thessaly Railways	Following station
Stasis Issari towards Volos	Volos–Kalambaka	Fanario Horio towards Kalambaka
Location
- Location within Greece

Fanari railway station (Greek: Σιδηροδρομικός σταθμός Φαναρίου, romanized: Sidirodromikós stathmós Fanari) is a small railway station in the Karditsa regional unit, Thessaly. Located with a farming community of the same name, it opened on 16 June 1886 by the Thessaly Railways (now part of OSE). Today TrainOSE operates both regional and intercity services to destinations across Greece.

Currently no trains serve the station, with rail replacement bus service operation between the Kalambaka and Paleofarsalos, where onward services can be found.

== History ==
The station open 16 June 1886 by the Thessaly Railways. The original station building (and the line) was designed by the Italian Evaristo de Chirico, (father of Giorgio de Chirico). The Greek government authorised the line under the law AMH'/22.6.1882. soon after the liberation of Central Greece from the Ottomans.

After the First World War, the Greek state planned the ambitious construction of several new rail lines and links, including a standard gauge line from Kalambaka on to Kozani and then Veroia creating a conversion of the route from Volos to Kalambaka on standard gauge. In 1927, the relevant decisions were made, starting in 1928, work was carried out on the construction of the new line from Kalambaka. But a year later, it was clear that the project would exceed the estimated costs many times over. In 1932, the construction work was stopped and remains unfinished. In 1955 Thessaly Railways was absorbed into Hellenic State Railways (SEK).

Freight traffic declined sharply when the state-imposed monopoly of OSE for transporting agricultural products and fertilizers ended in the early 1990s. Many small stations of the network with little passenger traffic were closed down, especially on the mainline section and between Karditsa and Kalampaka. In 2001 the section between Kalampaka and Palaiofarsalos was converted from Narrow-gauge (1000 mm) to standard gauge (1435 mm) and physically connected at Palaiofarsalos with the mainline from Athens to Thessaloniki. Since to upgrade; however, travel times improved and the unification of rail gauge allowed direct services, even InterCity services, to link Volos and Kalambaka with Athens and Thessaloniki.

In 2001, the infrastructure element of OSE was created, known as GAIAOSE; it would henceforth be responsible for the maintenance of stations, bridges, and other elements of the network, as well as the leasing and the sale of railway assists. In 2005, TrainOSE was created as a brand within OSE to concentrate on rail services and passenger interface. In 2009, with the Greek debt crisis unfolding OSE's Management was forced to reduce services across the network. Timetables were cut back, and routes closed as the government-run entity attempted to reduce overheads. In 2015, a 15-year-old child was airlifted to a hospital after being electrocuted at the station. In 2017 OSE's passenger transport sector was privatized as TrainOSE; currently, a wholly owned subsidiary of Ferrovie dello Stato Italiane infrastructure, including stations, remained under the control of OSE. In July 2022, the station began being served by Hellenic Train, the rebranded TranOSE.

On the 5 September 2023, Storm Daniel triggered largescale flooding in Thessaly. The rail infrastructure was badly affected in the region, cutting on both regional and intercity routes as significant parts of the infrastructure were washed away. OSE engineers were on the ground in the worst affected areas Domokos, Doxaras, and Paleofarsalos to assess the extent of the damage, and prepare detailed reports, and seek financial assistance from the European Union. 50 km (31 mi) of tracks was completely destroyed

Repairing the extensive damage, was estimated at between 35 and 45 million euros. OSE managing director, Panagiotis Terezakis, spoke of reconstruction works reaching 50 million euros, confirming at the same time that there will be no rail traffic in the effected sections of the network for at least a month. The devastation goes beyond the tracks and signalling, affecting costly equipment such as the European Train Control System (ETCS), which enhances rail safety. The line from Palaiofarsalos–Kalambaka was damaged, with extensive work needed to repair the line and resume services As a result services between Palaiofarsalos and Kalambaka remain suspended across Thessaly's coast until the track is repaired, with a rail-replacement bus in operation.

The station building is owned by GAIAOSE, which since 3 October 2001 owns most railway stations in Greece: the company was also in charge of rolling stock from December 2014 until October 2025, when Greek Railways (the owner of the Piraeus–Platy railway) took over that responsibility.

== Facilities ==
The Station is now a basic halt, with few facilities. There are no waiting rooms (as the station building is rundown and seemingly abandoned. The station is (as of 2020) unstaffed, with no ticket-purchasing facilities or parking.

== Services ==
In August 2009, TrainOSE S.A. proceeded to a drastic cutback of passenger services on Thessaly lines. As of Spring 2020, There are ten (five in each direction) Regional express services on Palaiofarsalos-Kalambaka Line. In addition, there is one Regional express train to Athens from Kalambaka and back (884/885).

Until 2023 the station was served by direct lines to the rest of Greece via Palaiofarsalos, served by intercity trains to Athens, Palaiofarsalos Larissa and Thessaloniki. Previously Thessaly Railways operated a narrow gauge service to Volos. However no trains currently (2026) call at this station due to track renewal work.

Note: It also announced in September 2023 the resumption of the rail replacement bus connecting Palaiofarsalos to Kalambaka, due to damage coursed by a mega-storm in September.
