= Monastery of St. Nicholas of Mpantovas =

Former monastery in Kalabaka Municipality, Thessaly Region, Greece

- Μονή Αγίου Νικολάου Μπάντοβα
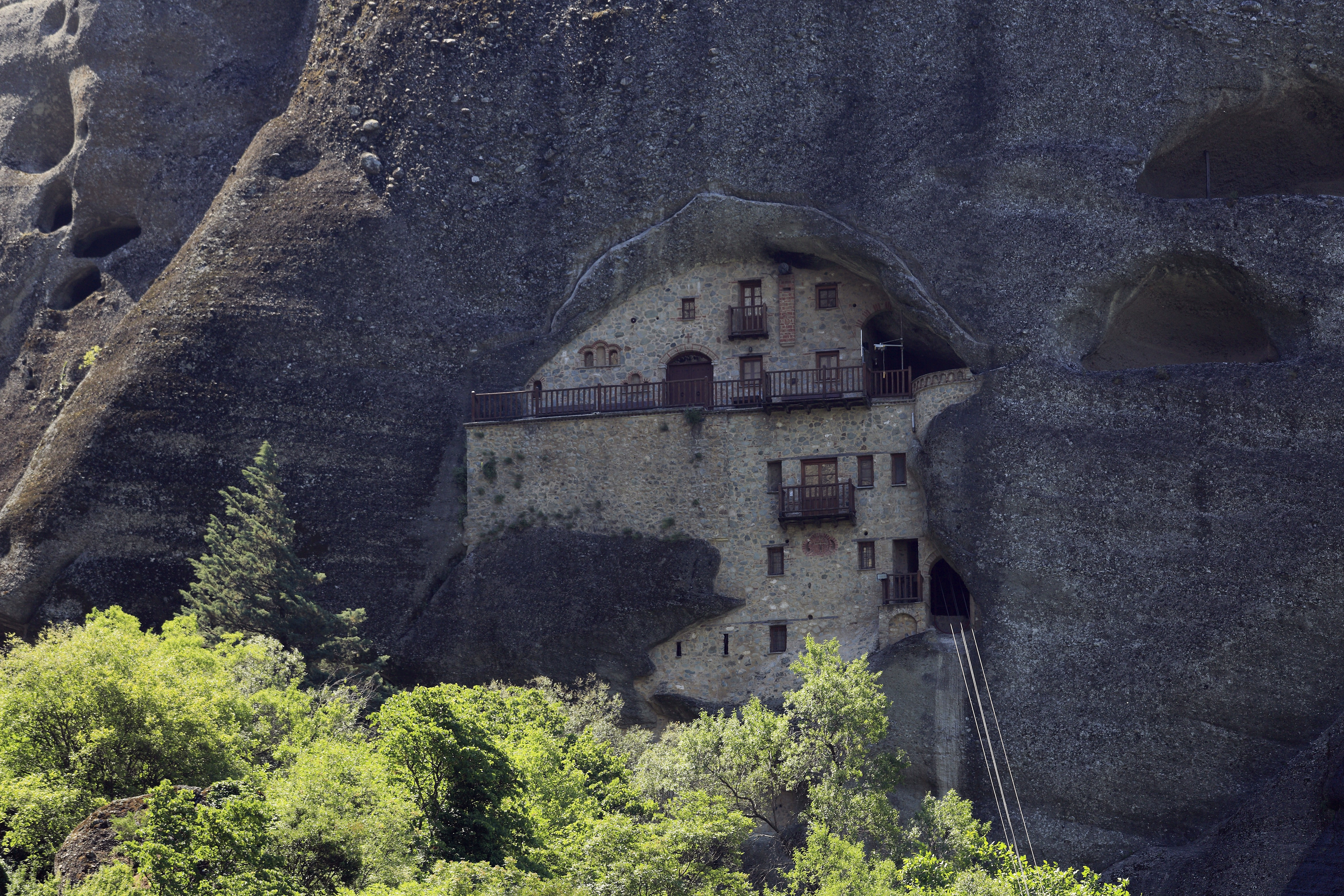
- The ruins of the monastery in the foreground

- Location of the former monastery in Greece
- Monastery of St. Nicholas of Mpantovas
- 39°42′39″N 21°37′20″E
- Location: Kalabaka, Thessaly
- Country: Greece
- Denomination: Greek Orthodox (former)

History
- Status: Monastery (c. 1400–1943)
- Dedication: Saint Nicholas

Architecture
- Functional status: Inactive (in partial ruins)
- Architectural type: Monastery
- Style: Byzantine (Athonite)
- Completed: c. 1400
- Demolished: 1943

The Monastery of St. Nicholas of Mpantovas (Greek: Μονή Αγίου Νικολάου Μπάντοβα, romanized: Moni Agiou Nikolaou Bantova) is a former Greek Orthodox monastery that is part of the Meteora monastery complex in Kalabaka, in the Thessaly region of central Greece.

== History ==
The monastery was founded in c. 1400 in a rock cave on Mpantovas Rock. In 1943, it was bombed by the Luftwaffe.

== Gallery ==
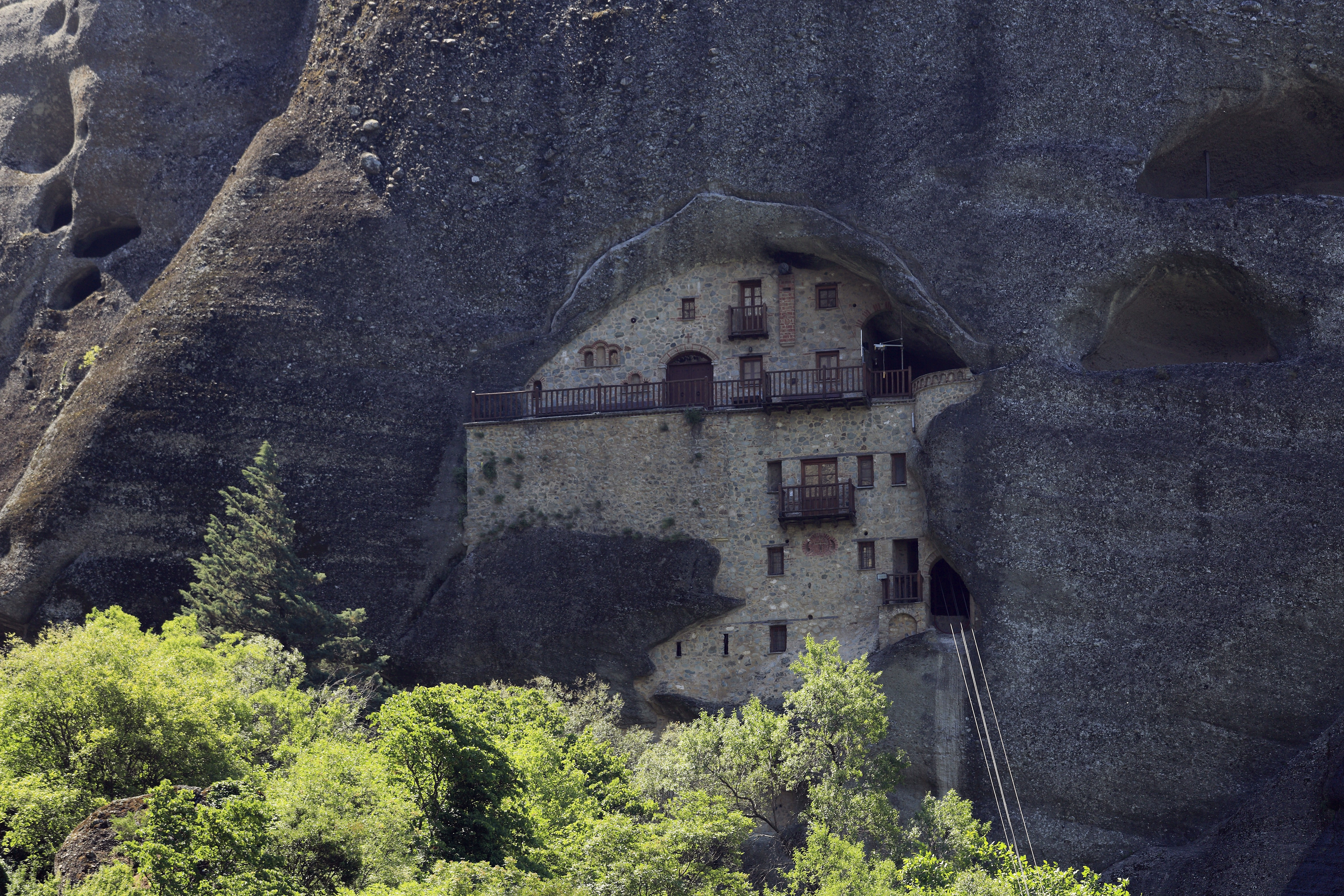

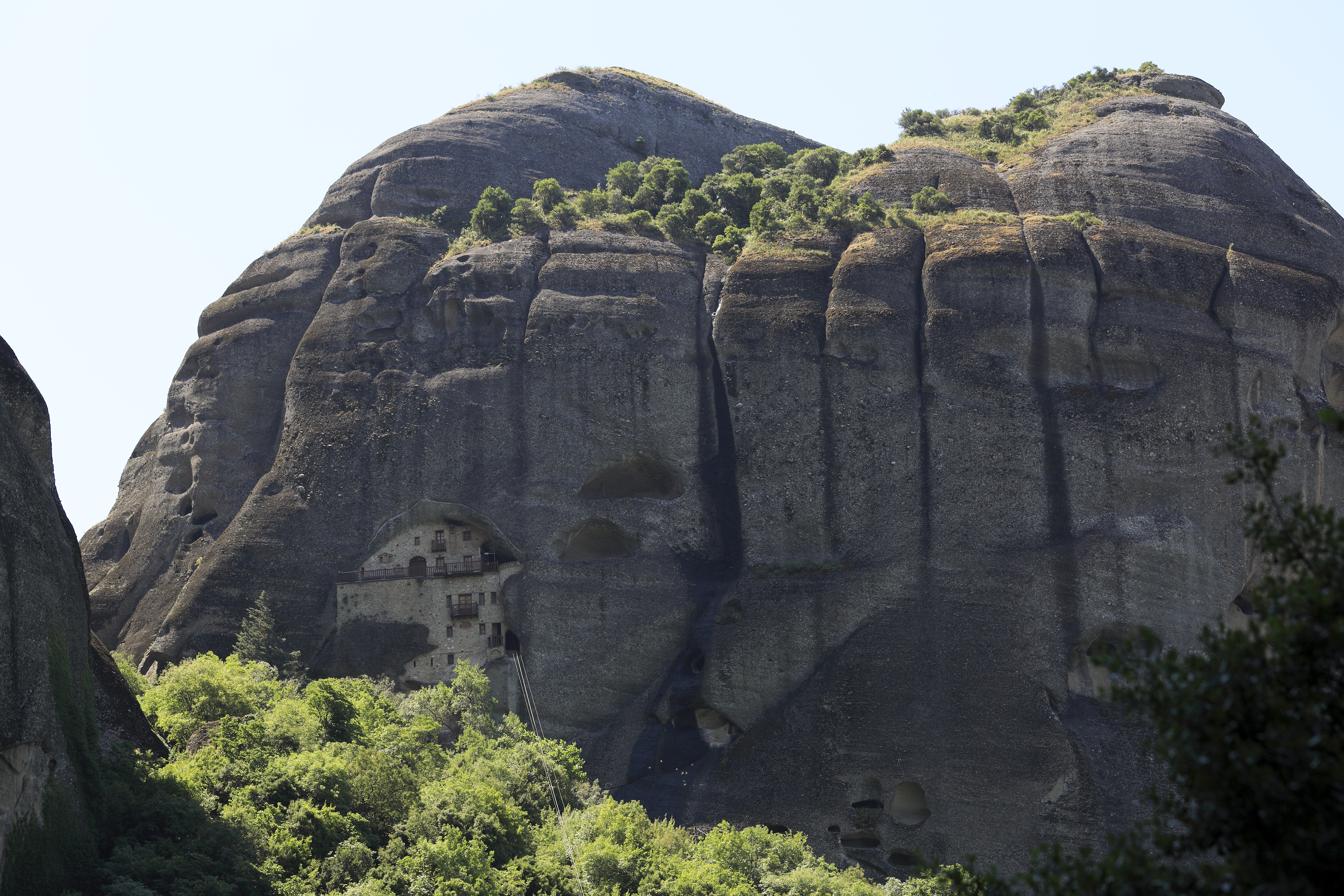

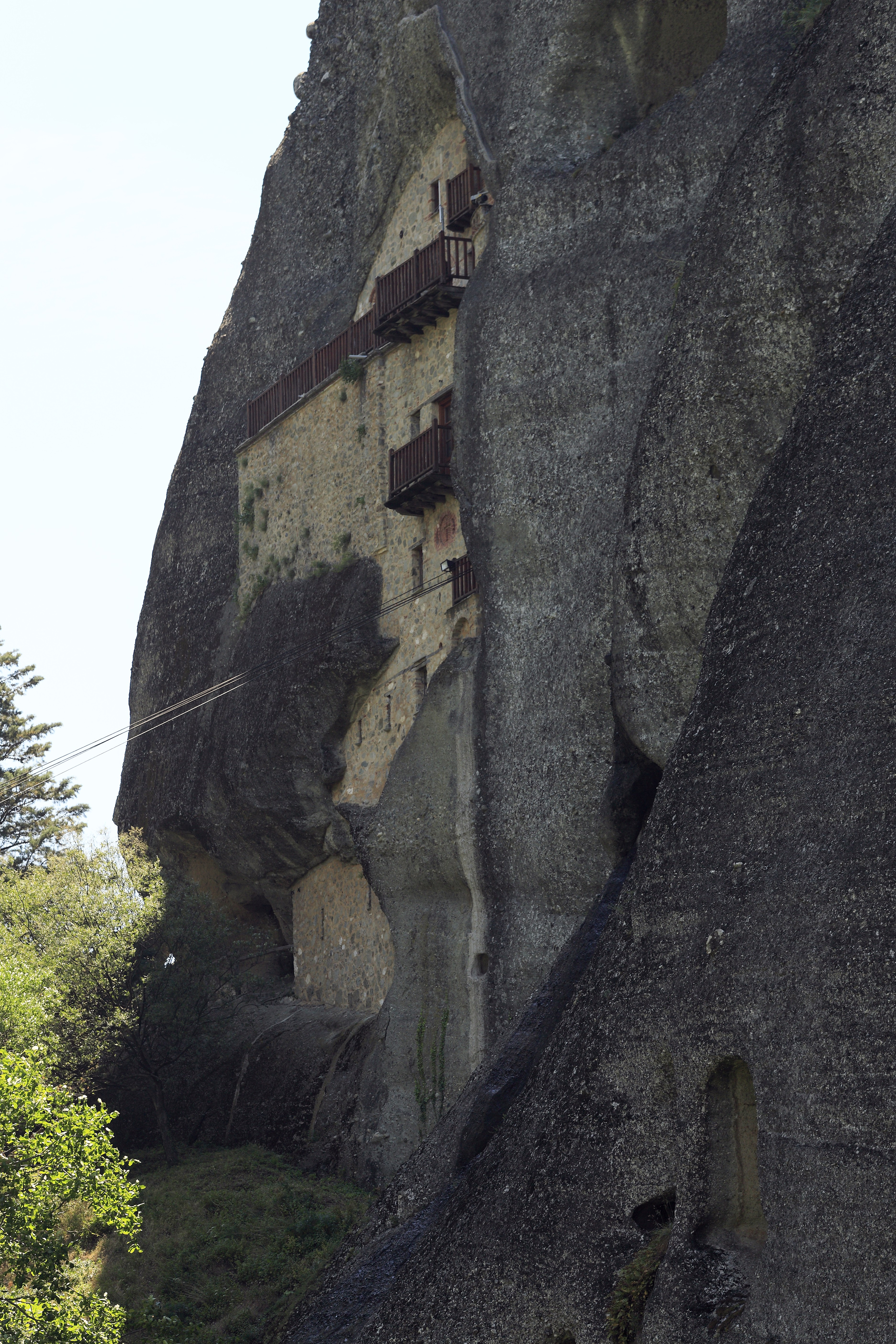

== See also ==
- Church of Greece
- List of Greek Orthodox monasteries in Greece
