= Avra =

Avra may refer to:

== Places ==
- Avra Valley, Arizona, U.S.
  - Avra Valley, Arizona, a populated place
  - Marana Regional Airport, also known as Avra Valley Airport
- Arbab Kandi, also known as Avra, a village in Ardabil Province, Iran
- Avra, Kozani, in the Greek region of Macedonia
- Aller, Devon, formerly known as Avra, England
- Avra, Trikala, a settlement in the Trikala regional unit, Greece

== People ==
- Avra (singer), a Greek-Australian singer-songwriter, actress, record producer and fashion stylist
- Avra M. Warren (1893–1957), United States Ambassador
- Avra Theodoropoulou (1880–1963), Greek music teacher, and women's rights activist

== Music ==
- "Avra" (song), 2012 song by Ivi Adamou
- Avra, 2001 album by Kroke

== Other uses ==
- Avra (spring water), a Coca-Cola brand of spring water from Temeni, Greece
- Avra, a fictional character in Green Lantern: Emerald Knights who is the "First Lantern"
- Avra Laboratories, founded by A. V. Rama Rao, an Indian inventor and chemist

== See also ==
- Aura (disambiguation)
