= Palaiofarsalos–Kalambaka railway =

Railway line in Greece

Palaiofarsalos-Kalambaka railway

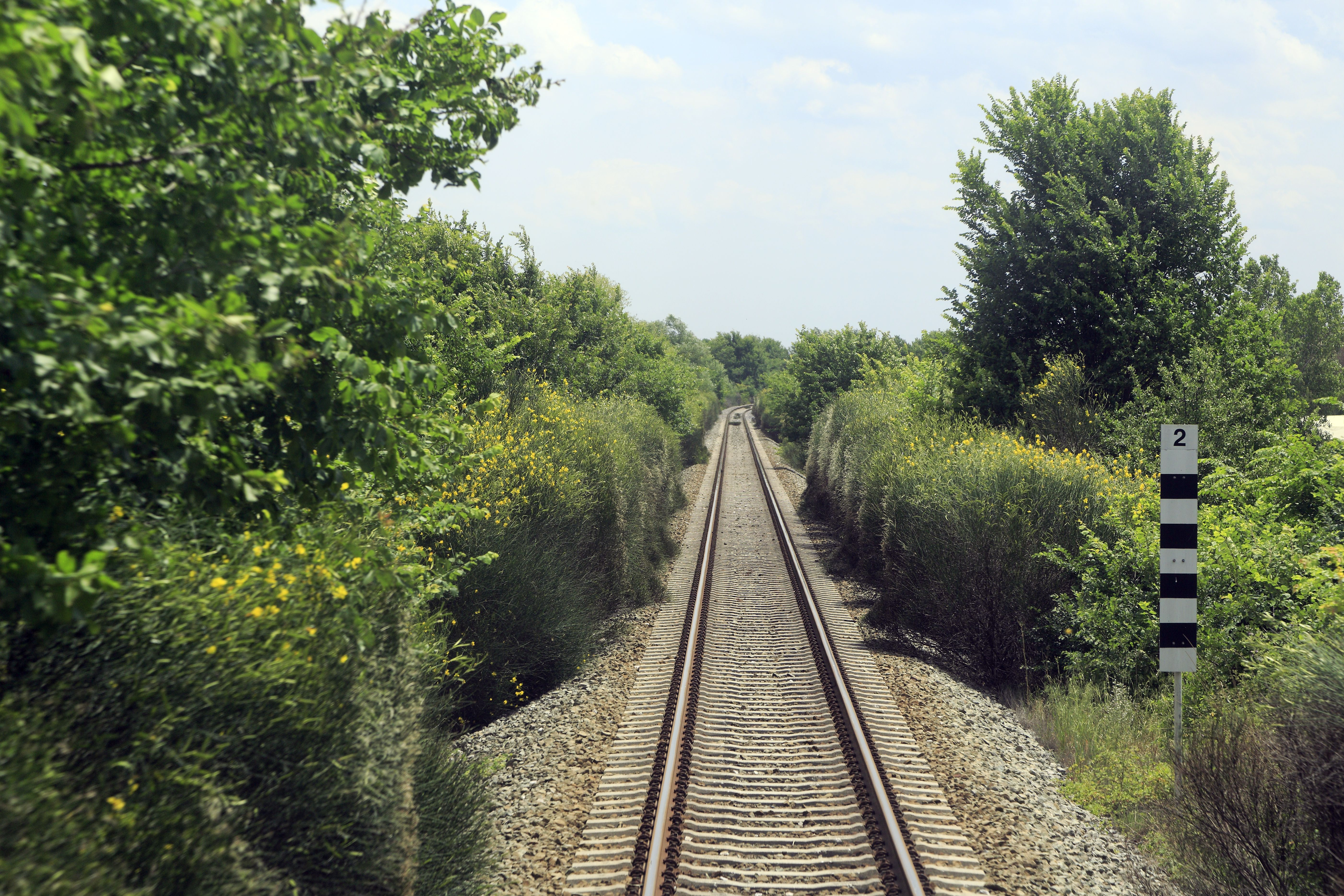
- View the line through the driver's seat between Karditsa and Trikala in May 2016.

Overview
- Status: Suspended / under restructuring
- Owner: GAIAOSE
- Locale: Greece (Thessaly)
- Termini: Palaiofarsalos 39.3142°N 22.2432°E; Kalambaka 39.7030°N 21.6254°E
- Stations: 7

Service
- Type: Commuter rail
- Operator: Hellenic Train

History
- Opened: 1886 (metre gauge); 2001 (standard gauge)

Technical
- Line length: 80.44 km (49.98 mi)
- Num of tracks: Single track
- Character: Secondary
- Track gauge: 1,435 mm (4 ft 8 1/2 in) standard gauge
- Electrification: No
- Operating speed: 100 km/h (62 mph) (highest)

The Palaiofarsalos to Kalambaka railway is a standard-gauge railway line that connects Kalambaka with the mainline station of Palaiofarsalos in Thessaly, Greece. Originally opened as a metre-gauge railway in 1886, it was converted to standard gauge in 2001.

== Route ==
The southern terminus of the line is Palaiofarsalos railway station near Farsala. Here, the line separates from the Piraeus–Platy railway and follows a branch of 80.44 km (49.98 mi). It continues to Karditsa and Trikala, and advances north-northwest to the northern terminus in Kalambaka.

The duration of the regular stopping service between Athens and Kalambaka is 4 hours and 11 minutes, but faster travel times can be achieved by taking the InterCity service to Thessaloniki and changing trains at Palaiofarsalos.

== Stations ==
The stations on the Palaiofarsalos–Kalambaka railway are:

- Palaiofarsalos railway station (connecting to Athens and Thessaloniki)
- Sofades railway station
- Karditsa railway station
- Fanari railway station
- Magoula railway station
- Trikala railway station
- Kalambaka railway station

== History ==
The metre-gauge railway from Palaiofarsalos to Kalambaka was inaugurated on 16 June 1886 as part of the Thessaly Railways, with services to and from Volos. It was built to a 1,000 mm (3 ft 3 3/8 in) metre gauge.

After the First World War, the Greek state had planned the ambitious construction of several new rail lines and links, including a standard gauge line from Kalambaka onto Kozani and then Veroia creating a conversion of the route from Volos to Kalambaka on standard gauge. In 1927, the relevant decisions were made; starting in 1928, work was carried out on the construction of the new line from Kalambaka. But a year later, it was clear that the project would exceed the estimated costs many times over. In 1932, the construction work was stopped and remains unfinished.

Freight traffic declined sharply when the state-imposed monopoly of OSE for the transport of agricultural products and fertilisers ended in the early 1990s. Many smaller stations on the network (with little passenger traffic) were closed, especially on the mainline section between Karditsa and Kalampaka.

In 2001 the section between Kalambaka and Palaiofarsalos was converted from 1000 mm gauge to standard gauge and physically connected at Palaiofarsalos with the mainline from Athens to Thessaloniki. By this upgrade, however, travel times improved and the unification of rail gauge allowed direct services, even InterCity services, to link Volos and Kalambaka with Athens and Thessaloniki.

On the 5 September 2023, Storm Daniel triggered largescale flooding in Thessaly. The rail infrastructure was badly affected in the region, cutting on both Regional and Intercity routes as significant parts of the infrastructure were washed away. OSE engineers were on the ground in the worst affected areas Domokos, Doxaras, and Paleofarsalos to assess the extent of the damage, and prepare detailed reports, and seek financial assistance from the European Union. 50 km (31 mi) of tracks was completely destroyed

Repairing the extensive damage, was estimated at between 35 and 45 million euros. OSE managing director, Panagiotis Terezakis, spoke of reconstruction works reaching 50 million euros, confirming at the same time that there will be no rail traffic in the effected sections of the network for at least a month. The devastation goes beyond the tracks and signalling, affecting costly equipment such as the European Train Control System (ETCS), which enhances rail safety.

The line from Palaiofarsalos–Kalambaka was damaged, with extensive work needed to repair the line and resume services As a result services between Palaiofarsalos and Kalambaka remain suspended across Thessaly’s coast until the track is repaired, with a rail-replacement bus in operation.

== Services ==
The Palaiofarsalos–Kalambaka railway is used by the following passenger services:

- Replacement bus service Palaiofarsalos-Kalabaka, The journey takes approximately 2 hours.

== Future ==
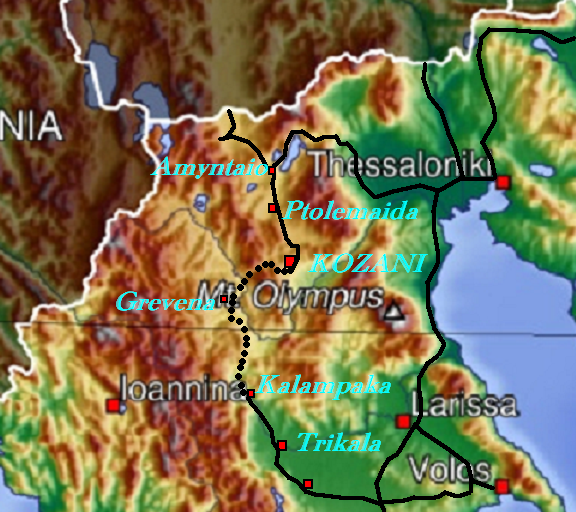
The Kozani–Amyntaio railway line and the future extension to Kalambaka and the Palaiofarsalos–Kalambaka railway as part of the western railway axis of Greece.

=== Upgrade ===
In early 2018 TrainOSE announced the upgrade of the line. This upgrade will involve doubling the track and full electrification from Kalambaka (allowing faster nonstopping services to Athens and Thessaloniki) with the installation of new signalling and ETCS Level 1 system on the existing single-track railway line. The tendering process was set for 11 October 2018, with funding being allocated to Operational Programme THESSALY 2014–2020. With a completion date of 2022. The time for Athens to Kalampakas will be reduced to 2 hours and 50 minutes, Athens to Karditsa 2 hours and Athens to Trikala 2 hours and 40 minutes. The projected costs estimate are set at €46,6500.

=== Extensions ===
East: Kalambaka – Grevena – Siatista – Kozani – Panagia Soumela Vermiou – Veria According to press reports, there is OSE's planning for line extensions, from Kalambaka to Grevena, Siatista and Kozani at first stage

West: Kalambaka–Ioannina-Igoumenitsa (project duration from the completion of the study: 5 years). In the projected second stage expansion from Kalambaka to Ioannina and Igoumenitsa in the framework of the Railway Egnatia. The expansion stations will be: Kalambaka-Malakasi-Anthochori-Ioannina-Kastritsa-Agios Nikolaos-Kristallopigi-Igoumenitsa.
