= Palaiofarsalos railway station =

Railway station in Larissa, Greece

Παλαιοφάρσαλος Palaiofarsalos
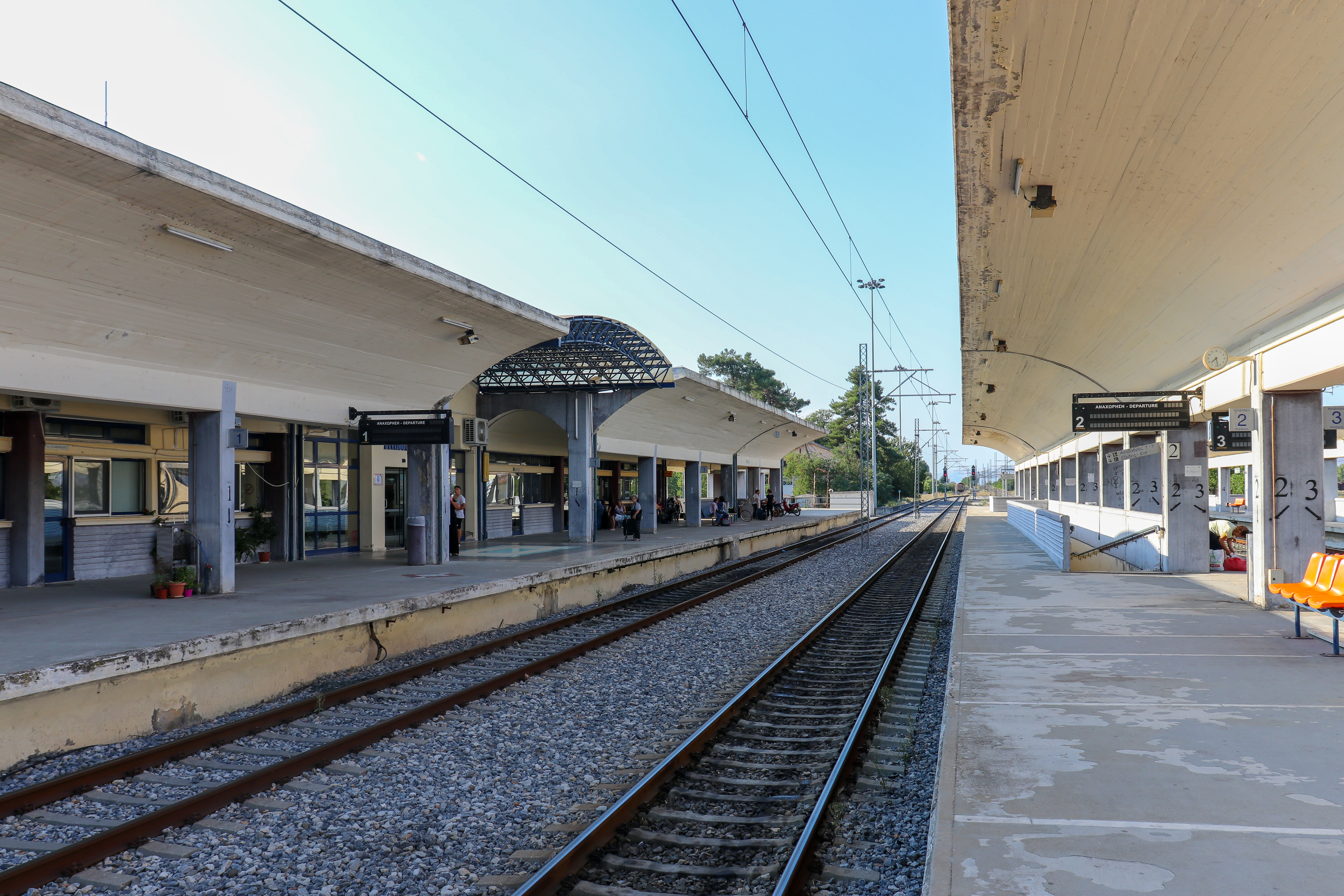
- Palaiofarsalos railway station, 2019

General information
- Location: Farsala 403 00, Stavros; Larissa; Greece
- Coordinates: 39°18′51″N 22°14′36″E
- Elevation: 160 metres (520 ft)
- Owner: GAIAOSE
- Operator: Hellenic Train
- Lines: Palaiofarsalos–Kalambaka railway; Piraeus–Platy railway
- Distance: 297 kilometres (185 mi) from Athens
- Platforms: 4
- Tracks: 7
- Train operators: Hellenic Train
- Connections: Bus Bus

Construction
- Structure type: at Grade
- Platform levels: 2
- Parking: Yes
- Cycle facilities: No
- Architectural style: Modern

Other information
- Status: Staffed
- Website: http://www.ose.gr/en/

History
- Opened: 1908
- Rebuilt: 1932
- Electrified: 25 kV 50 Hz AC
- Former names: Demerli
- Original company: Thessaly Railways

Services
Preceding station	Hellenic Train	Following station
Leianokladi towards Athens	C1 Athens-Thessaloniki	Larissa towards Thessaloniki
Domokos towards Athens	C2 Athens-Kalambaka	Sofades towards Kalambaka
Terminus	G3 Palaiofarsalos-Kalambaka	Sofades towards Kalambaka
Former service
Preceding station	Thessaly Railways	Following station
Enotiki towards Volos	Volos–Kalambaka	Stasis Sofadon towards Kalambaka
Location
- Location within Greece

Palaiofarsalos railway station (Greek: Σιδηροδρομικός Σταθμός Παλαιοφαρσάλου, romanized: Sidirodromikós Stathmós Palaiofarsálou) is a railway station near Farsala in Larissa regional unit, Greece. It is located in the village Stavros, 12 kilometres (7.5 mi) west of Farsala. It is situated at the junction of the main Piraeus–Platy railway and the branch line to Trikala and Kalambaka. It is served by intercity trains between Athens and Thessaloniki and by local trains to Kalambaka.

== History ==
The Palaiofarsalos station opened in 1908 as Demerli at the meeting point between the metric line of the Thessaly Railways (S.Th.) and the standard line of the Piraeus-Demerli-Sinoron Railway (S.P.D.S.) or “Larissaykos”.

After the First World War, the Greek state planned the ambitious construction of several new rail lines and links, including a standard gauge line from Kalambaka onto Kozani and then Veroia creating a conversion of the route from Volos to Kalambaka on standard gauge. In 1927, the relevant decisions were made; starting in 1928, work was carried out on the construction of the new line from Kalambaka. But a year later, it was clear that the project would exceed the estimated costs many times over. In 1932, the construction work was stopped and remains unfinished.

In 1955 Thessaly Railways was absorbed into Hellenic State Railways (SEK). In 1970 OSE became the legal successor to the SEK, taking over responsibilities for most of Greece's rail infrastructure. In 1971, the Hellenic State Railways was reorganised into the OSE taking over responsibilities for most of Greece's rail infrastructure. It was during this time the station was rebuilt in the modernist style, in which the canopies still stand.

Freight traffic declined sharply when the state-imposed monopoly of OSE for the transport of agricultural products and fertilisers ended in the early 1990s. Many small stations of the network with little passenger traffic were closed down, especially on the mainline section and between Karditsa and Kalampaka. In 2001 the section between Kalampaka and Palaiofarsalos were converted from Narrow gauge (1000 mm) to standard gauge (1435 mm) and physically connected at Palaiofarsalos with the mainline from Athens to Thessaloniki. Since to upgrade; however, travel times improved and the unification of rail gauge allowed direct services, even InterCity services, to link Sofades and Kalambaka with Athens and Thessaloniki.

In 2009, with the Greek debt crisis unfolding OSE's Management was forced to reduce services across the network. Timetables were cut back, and routes closed as the government-run entity attempted to reduce overheads. In 2017 OSE's passenger transport sector was privatised as TrainOSE, currently a wholly owned subsidiary of Ferrovie dello Stato Italiane infrastructure, including stations, remained under the control of OSE.

In September 2020, Cyclone Ianos hit Greece. Palaiofarsalos railway station temporarily remained out of operation, with Thessaloniki-Paleofarsalos routes terminating at Larissa.

In July 2022, the station began being served by Hellenic Train, the rebranded TrainOSE. On 28 February 2023 during the afternoon, an overhead line cable snapped and fell on a passenger train at the station, causing a power outage in the area that led to significant delays; one of the trains affected by the delays later collided with a freight train near the Tempe Valley, killing over 40 people.

On the 5 September 2023, Storm Daniel triggered largescale flooding in Thessaly. The rail infrastructure was badly affected in the region, cutting off both Regional and Intercity routes as significant parts of the infrastructure were washed away. OSE engineers were on the ground in the worst affected areas, such as Paleofarsalos to assess the extent of the damage, and prepare detailed reports, and seek financial assistance from the European Union. 50 km (31 mi) of tracks was completely destroyed

Repairing the extensive damage, was estimated at between 35 and 45 million euros. OSE managing director, Panagiotis Terezakis, spoke of reconstruction works reaching 50 million euros, confirming at the same time that there will be no rail traffic in the effected sections of the network for at least a month. The devastation goes beyond the tracks and signalling, affecting costly equipment such as the European Train Control System (ETCS), which enhances rail safety. In November 2023, rail services resumed between Larissa and Rapsani With Through services from Athens to Thessaloniki recommencing on 16 December 2023.

== Facilities ==
The station is housed in a 1960's era brick-built station building, renovated in the early 21st century but now slightly rundown. As of (2008) the station is unstaffed, with no staffed booking office; however, there are waiting rooms and is equipped with toilets. Unlike other larger stations in Greece, Lockers are not available at this station. Access to the platforms is via a subway under the lines. The platforms have shelters with seating, and seating is available under the original 1960s modernist canopies. There are both Dot-matrix display departure and arrival screens and timetable poster boards on the platforms, as well as a buffet/coffee shop. There is also parking in the forecourt. The station has been the victim of repeated vandalism.

== Services ==
Various Hellenic Train services call at the mainline station, including the InterCity service towards Athens and Thessaloniki, and Local stopping services to Kalambaka. Until September 2023, the station was served by Express and Regional stopping services to Kalambaka. as a result of damage to the infrastructure (as of Dec 2025) there is a rail replacement bus service between Kalambaka and Palaiofarsalos.

=== National rail services ===
The station is served the following Hellenic Train services:

- Local stopping services to Kalambaka. (Currently suspended) (2025)
- Regional services to Larissa (Currently suspended) (2024)
- Express services to Kalambaka and Thessaloniki stopping services to Kalambaka.
- InterCity routes to Athens and Thessaloniki.

Note: It also announced in September 2023 the resumption of the rail replacement bus connecting Palaiofarsalos to Kalambaka, due to damage coursed by a mega-storm in September.

=== Local public transport ===
The station is also served by local and regional buses:

== Gallery ==
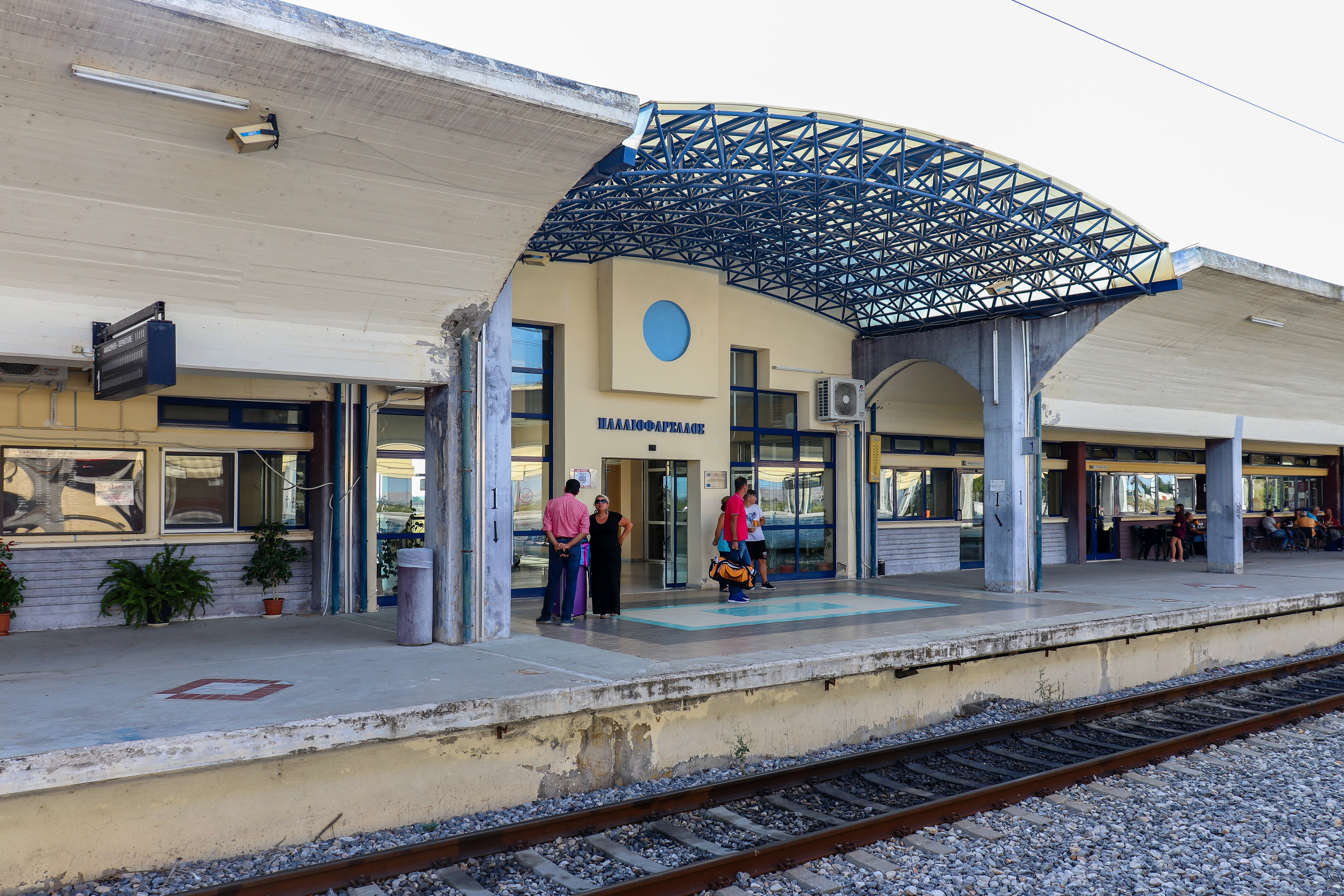
View of the station entrance onto platform 1, August 2019

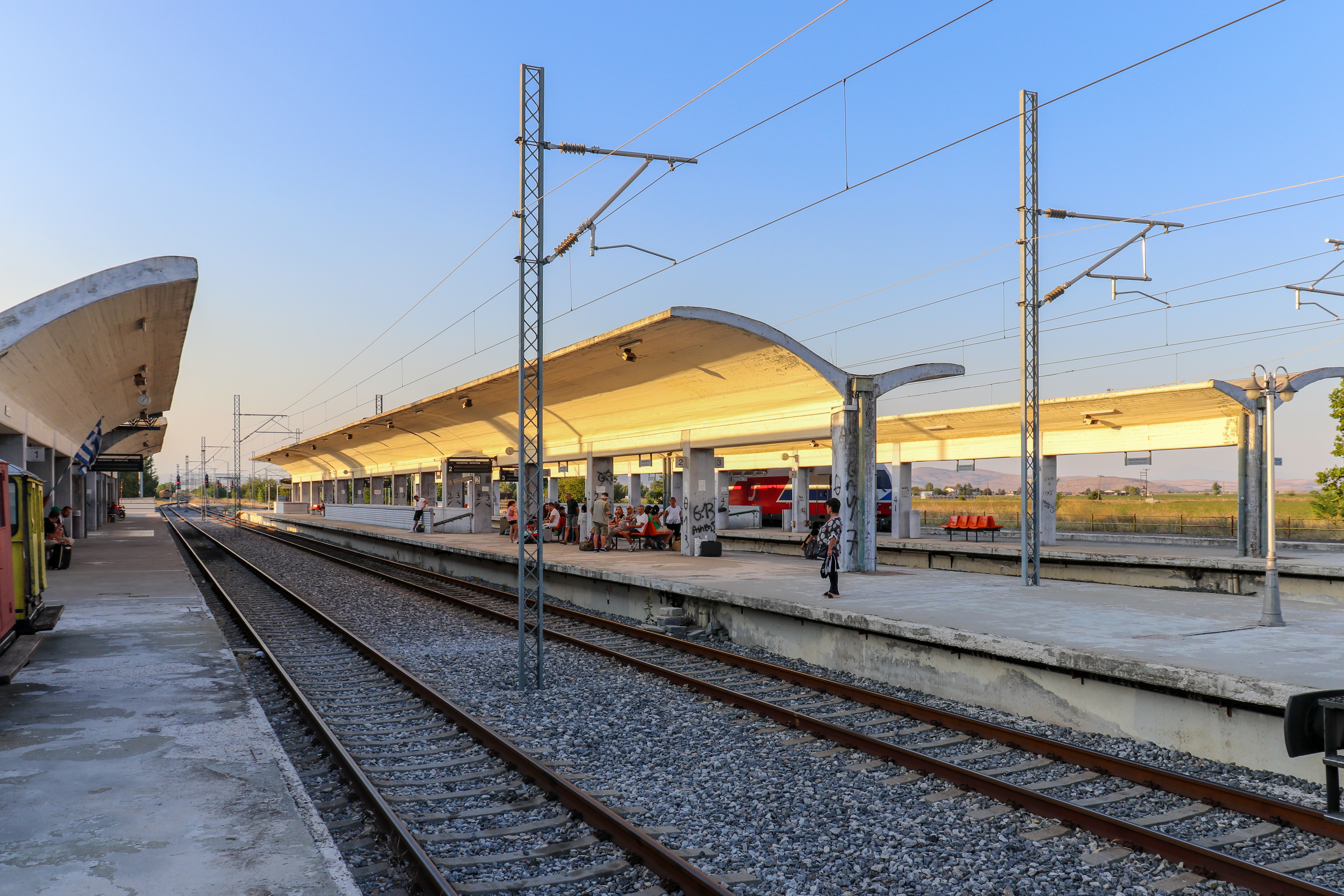
View of the station showing all the through platforms, August 2019

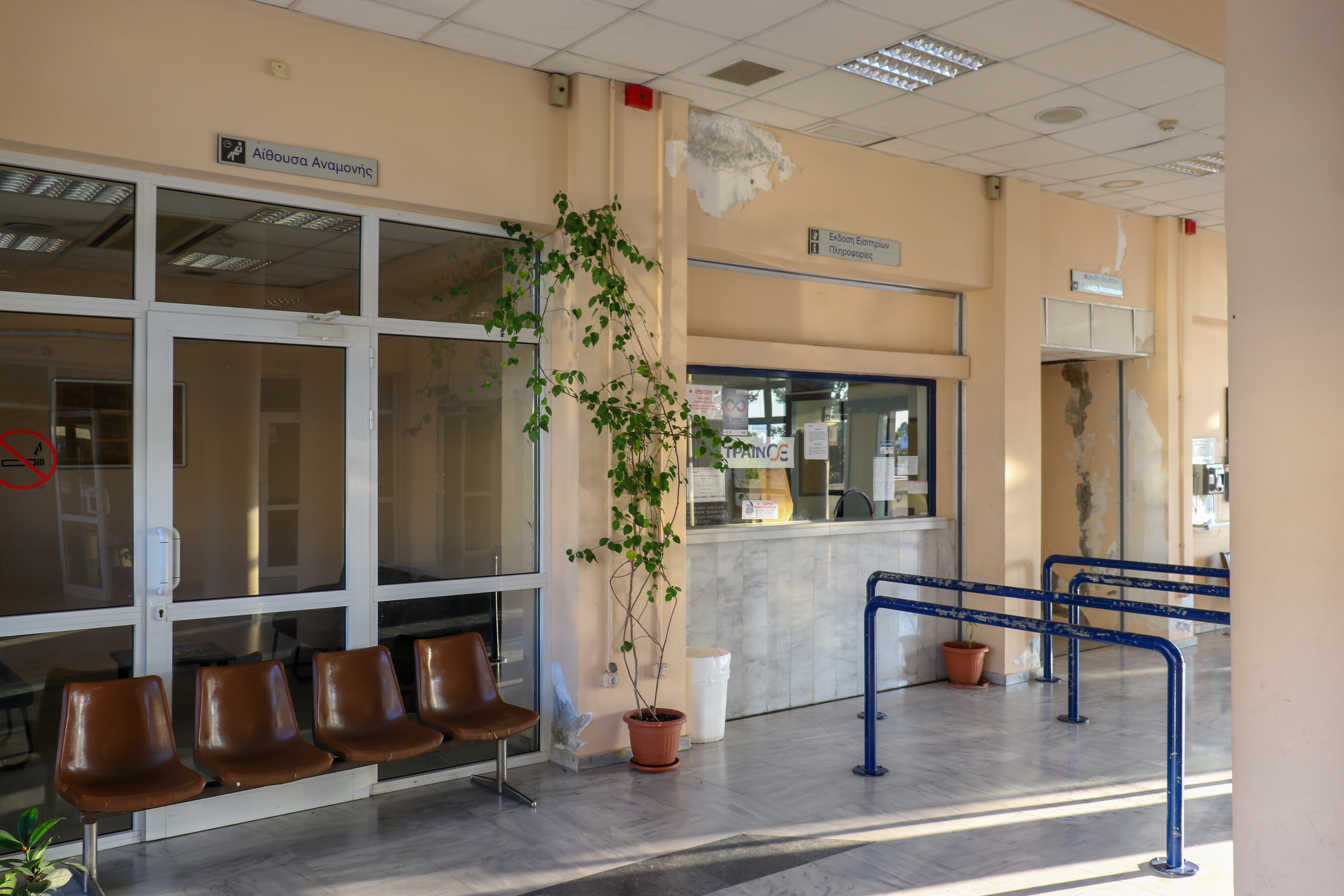
View of the station booking hall, August 2019

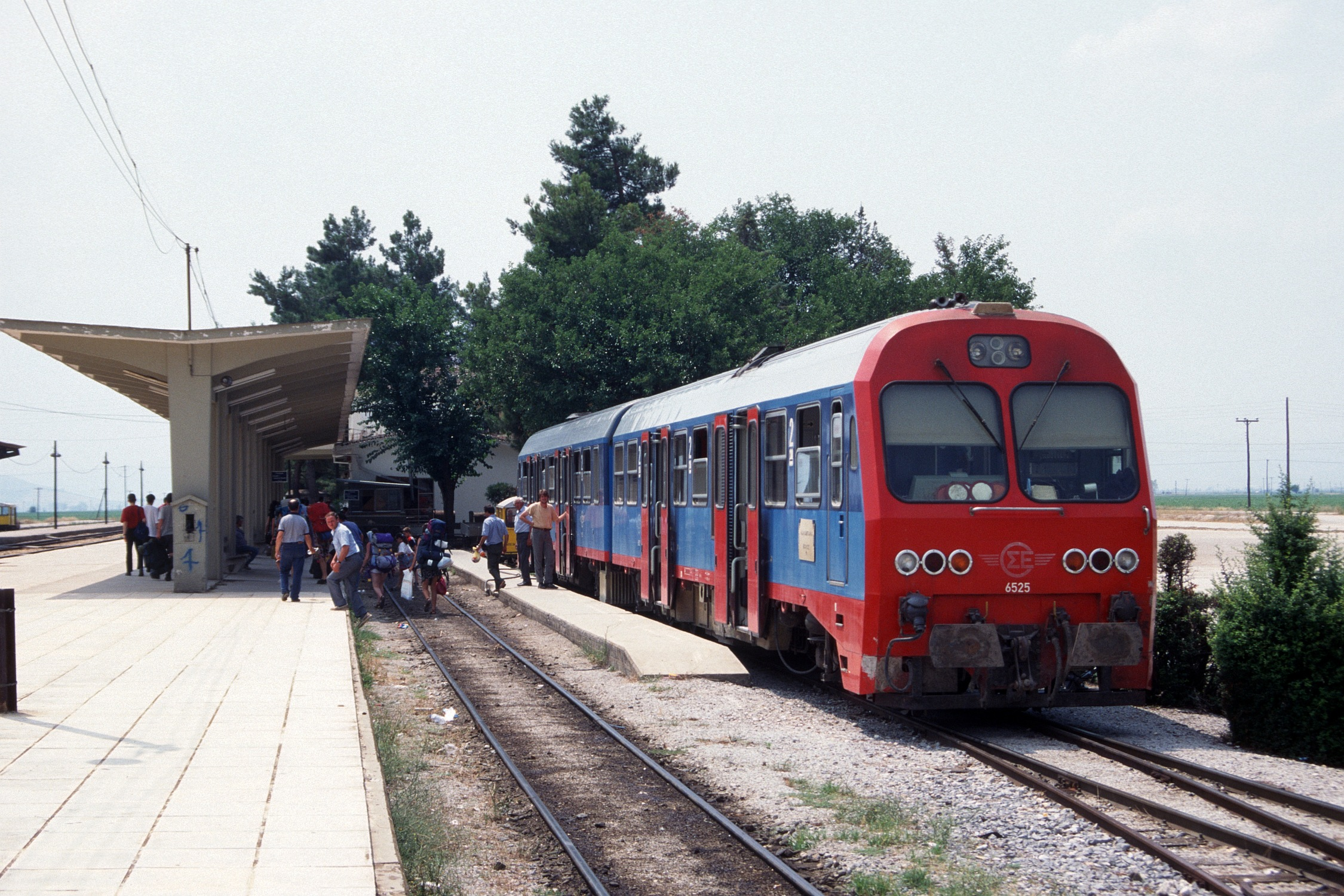
MAN-Nahverkehrmeter built Thessaly meter gauge DMU railcar awaiting departure to Volos (before the line was upgraded), 1995.
