= Avra, Trikala =

Village in Thessaly, Greece

Avra Αύρα
- Community
- Location within Greece
- Coordinates: 39.71135°N 21.69084°E
- Country: Greece
- Administrative region: Thessaly
- Regional unit: Trikala
- Municipality: Meteora
- Elevation: 249 m (817 ft)

Population (2021)
  - Community: 377
- Time zone: UTC+2 (EET)
  - Summer (DST): UTC+3 (EEST)

Avra (Greek: Αύρα) is a village in the municipality of Meteora in Trikala, Thessaly, Greece.

== History ==
The community of Koprainis was established on August 16, 1912, when the settlement of Kopraina (Κόπραινα) was split off from the municipality of Aigini (Δήμος Αιγινίου) and designated as the seat of the community. On October 10, 1955, Kopraina was renamed Avra. It was merged into the municipality of Kalampaka on December 4, 1997.

== Geography ==
Avra is located approximately 12 km east of the town center of Kalabaka and 22 km from Trikala. Agriculture is the main economic activity, along with tourism.

== Attractions ==
The Monastery of Saint George at Avra (Greek: Μονή Αγίου Γεωργίου Αύρας) is located in the hills to the northwest of the town center. According to local traditions, Saint Cosmas of Aetolia had stopped at the site of the monastery during his travels.
