= Kalambaka railway station =

Railway station in Kalabaka, Trikala, Thessaly, Greece

Καλαμπάκα Kalambaka
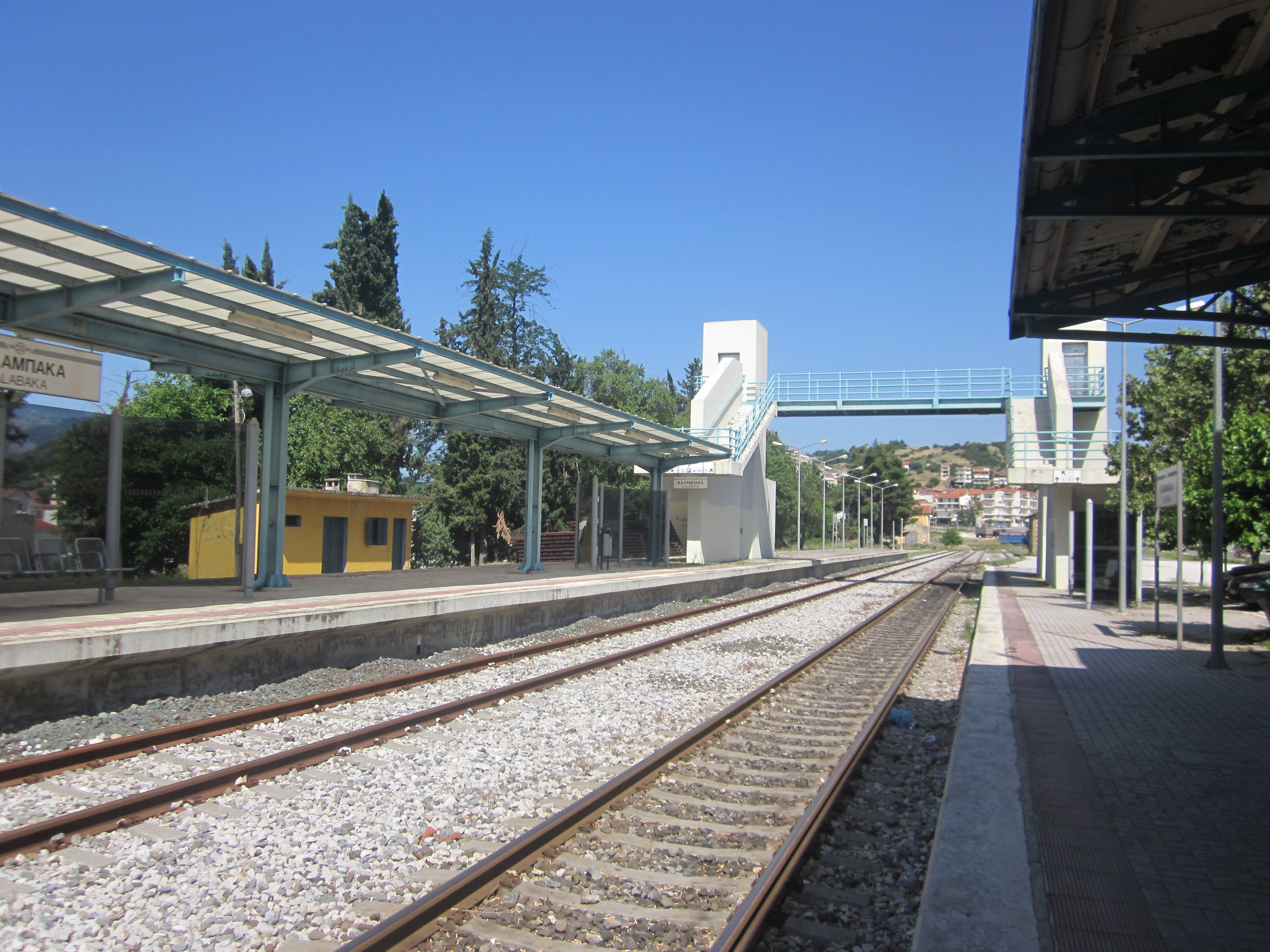
- Kalambaka station, June 2012

General information
- Location: Kalambaka 422 00, Greece; Trikala; Greece
- Coordinates: 39°42′11″N 21°37′31″E
- Owner: Hellenic Railways
- Line: Palaiofarsalos–Kalambaka railway
- Platforms: 2
- Tracks: 3
- Train operators: Hellenic Train
- Connections: Bus

Construction
- Structure type: at-grade
- Platform levels: 1
- Parking: Yes
- Cycle facilities: No

Other information
- Status: Staffed
- Website: Hellenic Railways Organisation

History
- Opened: 16 June 1886; 140 years ago
- Closed: 1998
- Rebuilt: 2001
- Electrified: No

Services
Preceding station	Hellenic Train	Following station
Trikala towards Athens	C2 Athens-Kalambaka	Terminus
Trikala towards Palaiofarsalos	G3 Palaiofarsalos-Kalambaka	Terminus

Former service
Preceding station	Thessaly Railways	Following station
Theopetra towards Volos	Volos–Kalambaka	Terminus
Location
- Location within Greece

Kalambaka railway station (Greek: Σιδηροδρομικός σταθμός Καλαμπάκας, romanized: Sidirodromikós stathmós Kalambákas) is the main railway station in Kalabaka, in the Trikala regional unit, Thessaly. Opened on 16 June 1886 by the Thessaly Railways (now part of OSE) as its first terminal station. Today Hellenic Train operates Regional Express services to destinations across Greece. It is currently the most northwesterly part of the Greek railway network in operation.

Currently no trains serve the station, with rail replacement bus service operation between the Kalambaka and Paleofarsalos, where onward services can be found.

== History ==
The station opened on 16 June 1886 as a terminus of Thessaly Railways. The original station building (and the line) was designed by the Italian Evaristo de Chirico, (father of Giorgio de Chirico). The line was authorised by the Greek government under law AMH’/22.6.1882. soon after the liberation of Central Greece from the Ottomans.

After the First World War, the Greek state planned the ambitious construction of several new rail lines and links, including a standard gauge line from Kalambaka onto Kozani and then Veroia creating a conversion of the route from Volos to Kalambaka on standard gauge. In 1927, the relevant decisions were made; starting in 1928, work was carried out on the construction of the new line from Kalambaka. But a year later, it was clear that the project would exceed the estimated costs many times over. In 1932, the construction work was stopped and remains unfinished. In 1955 Thessaly Railways was absorbed into Hellenic State Railways (SEK).

Freight traffic declined sharply when the state-imposed monopoly of OSE for the transport of agricultural products and fertilisers ended in the early 1990s. Many small stations of the network with little passenger traffic were closed down, especially on the mainline section and between Karditsa and Kalampaka. In 2001 the section between Kalampaka and Palaiofarsalos was converted from narrow gauge (1000 mm) to standard gauge (1435 mm) and physically connected at Palaiofarsalos with the mainline from Athens to Thessaloniki. Since the upgrade, travel times have improved and the unification of rail gauge allowed direct services, even InterCity services, to link Volos and Kalambaka with Athens and Thessaloniki.

In 2001, the infrastructure element of OSE was created, known as GAIAOSE. It would henceforth be responsible for the maintenance of stations, bridges and other network elements, as well as the leasing and the sale of railway assets. In 2005, TrainOSE was created as a brand within OSE to concentrate on rail services and passenger interfaces. In 2009, with the Greek debt crisis unfolding OSE's Management was forced to reduce services across the network. Timetables were cut back, and routes closed as the government-run entity attempted to reduce overheads. In August 2009, TrainOSE S.A. proceeded with a drastic cutback of passenger services on Thessaly lines.

In 2015 a 15-year-old child was airlifted to a hospital after being electrocuted at the station. In 2017 OSE's passenger transport sector was privatised as TrainOSE, currently, a wholly owned subsidiary of Ferrovie dello Stato Italiane infrastructure, including stations, remained under the control of OSE. In July 2022, the station began being served by Hellenic Train, as the rebranded TranOSE.

In spring 2020, there are ten (five in each direction) regional services on Palaiofarsalos-Kalambaka Line. In addition, there is one regional train to Athens from Kalambaka and back (884/885).

On the 5 September 2023, Storm Daniel triggered largescale flooding in Thessaly. The rail infrastructure was badly affected in the region, cutting on both Regional and Intercity routes as significant parts of the infrastructure were washed away. OSE engineers were on the ground in the worst affected areas Domokos, Doxaras, and Paleofarsalos to assess the extent of the damage, and prepare detailed reports, and seek financial assistance from the European Union. 50 km (31 mi) of tracks was completely destroyed

Repairing the extensive damage, was estimated at between 35 and 45 million euros. OSE managing director, Panagiotis Terezakis, spoke of reconstruction works reaching 50 million euros, confirming at the same time that there will be no rail traffic in the effected sections of the network for at least a month. The devastation goes beyond the tracks and signalling, affecting costly equipment such as the European Train Control System (ETCS), which enhances rail safety. The line from Palaiofarsalos–Kalambaka was damaged, with extensive work needed to repair the line and resume services As a result services between Palaiofarsalos and Kalambaka remain suspended across Thessaly’s coast until the track is repaired, with a rail-replacement bus in operation.

In August 2025, the Greek Ministry of Infrastructure and Transport confirmed the creation of a new body, Greek Railways (Greek: Σιδηρόδρομοι Ελλάδος, romanized: Ellinikí Sidiródromi Monoprósopi) to assume responsibility for rail infrastructure, planning, modernisation projects, and rolling stock across Greece. Previously, these functions were divided among several state-owned entities: OSE, which managed infrastructure; ERGOSÉ, responsible for modernisation projects; and GAIAOSÉ, which owned stations, buildings, and rolling stock. OSE had overseen both infrastructure and operations until its vertical separation in 2005. Rail safety has been identified as a key priority. The merger follows the July approval of a Parliamentary Bill to restructure the national railway system, a direct response to the Tempi accident of February 2023, in which 43 people died after a head-on collision.

== Name ==
In modern Greek, MP is transliterated as B, not as MB and not as MP. That shows on the station sign and also on beer labels (MPYRA).

== Facilities ==
The station has waiting rooms on platform 1. There is a footbridge from platform 1 to platform 2, via stairs or lift. Luggage storage is no longer available; however, the station is staffed with ticket-purchasing facilities.

== Services ==
In August 2009, TrainOSE S.A. proceeded to a drastic cutback of passenger services on Thessaly lines. As of Spring 2020, There are ten (five in each direction) Regional express services on Palaiofarsalos-Kalambaka Line. In addition, there is one Regional express train to Athens from Kalambaka and back (884/885).

Until 2023 the station was served by direct lines to the rest of Greece via Palaiofarsalos, served by intercity trains to Athens, Palaiofarsalos Larissa and Thessaloniki. Previously Thessaly Railways operated a narrow gauge service to Volos. However no trains currently (2026) call at this station due to track renewal work.

Note: It also announced in September 2023 the resumption of the rail replacement bus connecting Palaiofarsalos to Kalambaka, due to damage coursed by a mega-storm in September.

== Future plans ==
An extension towards Ioannina and Igoumenitsa has been discussed, but a more northern line from Thessaloniki is currently the preferred trajectory of the so-called Egnatia Railway. However, as of 2020, large investments are unlikely, given the prolonged Greek government-debt crisis.

L Ground/Concourse	Customer service	Tickets/Exits
Level; L1	Side platform, doors will open on the right
Level; L1	Platform 1	towards Larissa (Trikala) →
Level; L1	Platform 2	towards Palaiofarsalos (Trikala) →
Level; L1	Island platform, doors will open on the right

== Gallery ==
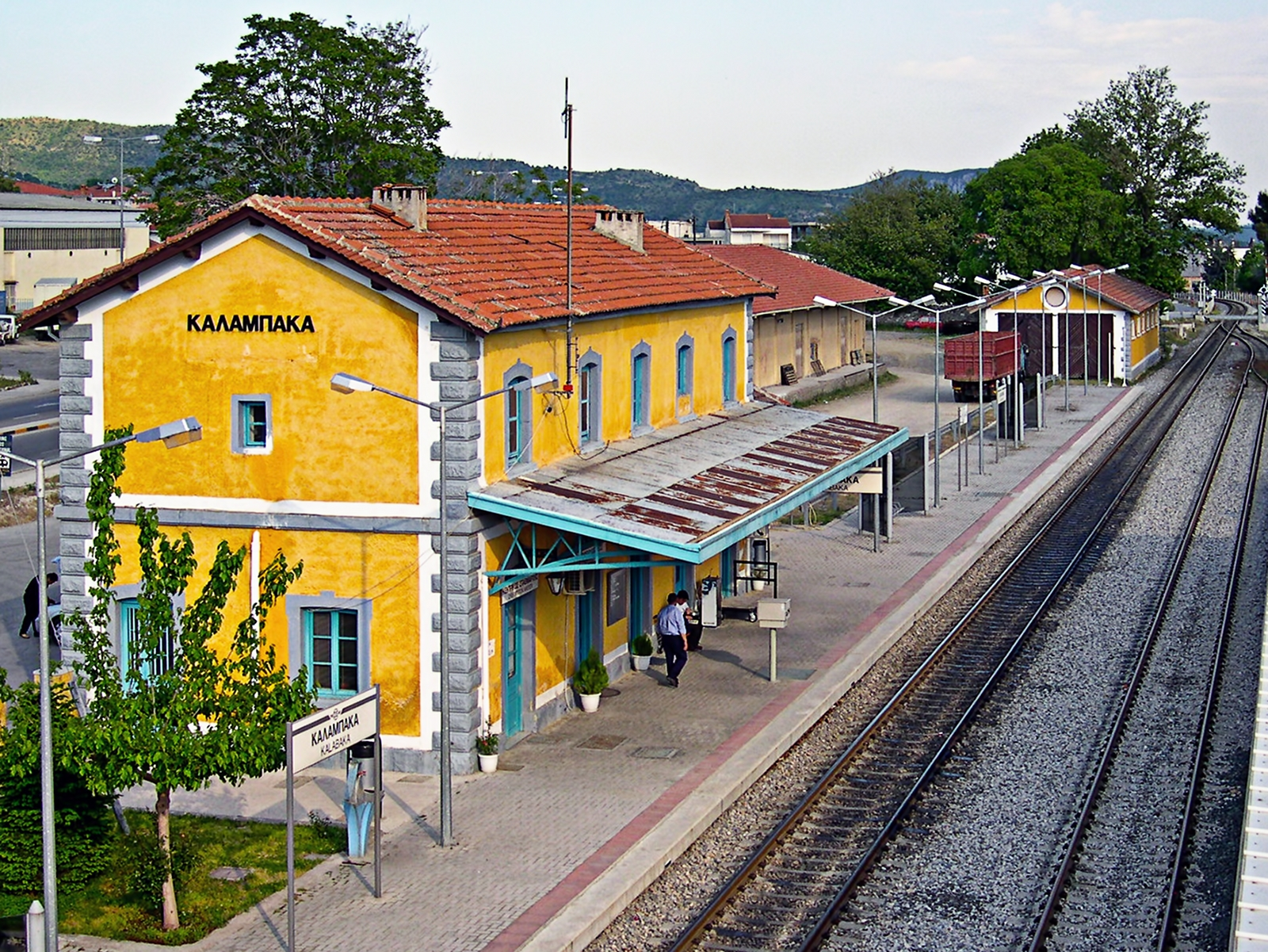
Kalambaka railway station 17 October 2011 (Ioannis Houvardas)

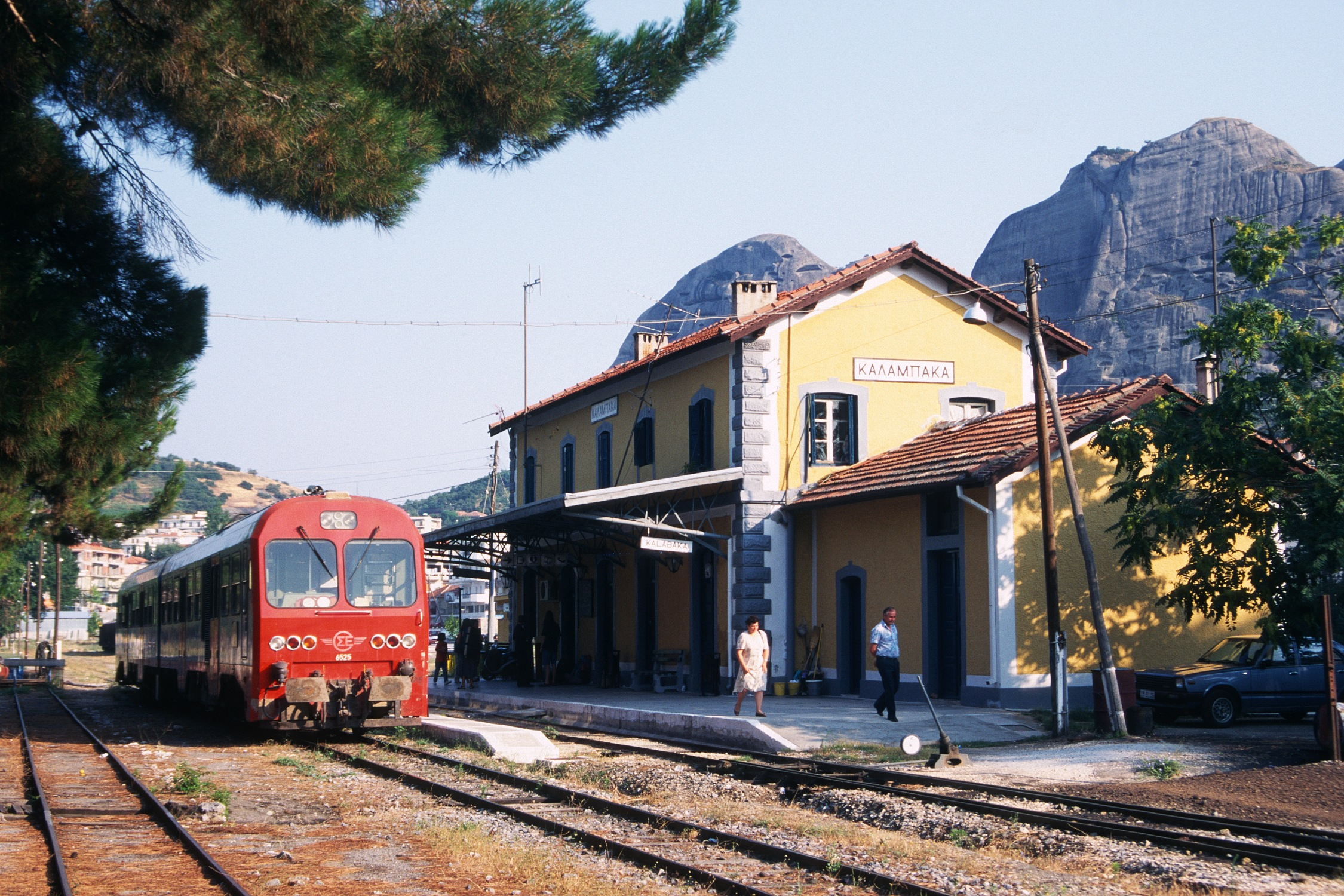
Kalambaka railway station in 1995 (The Volos–Kalambaka line was still in meter gauge at that time)

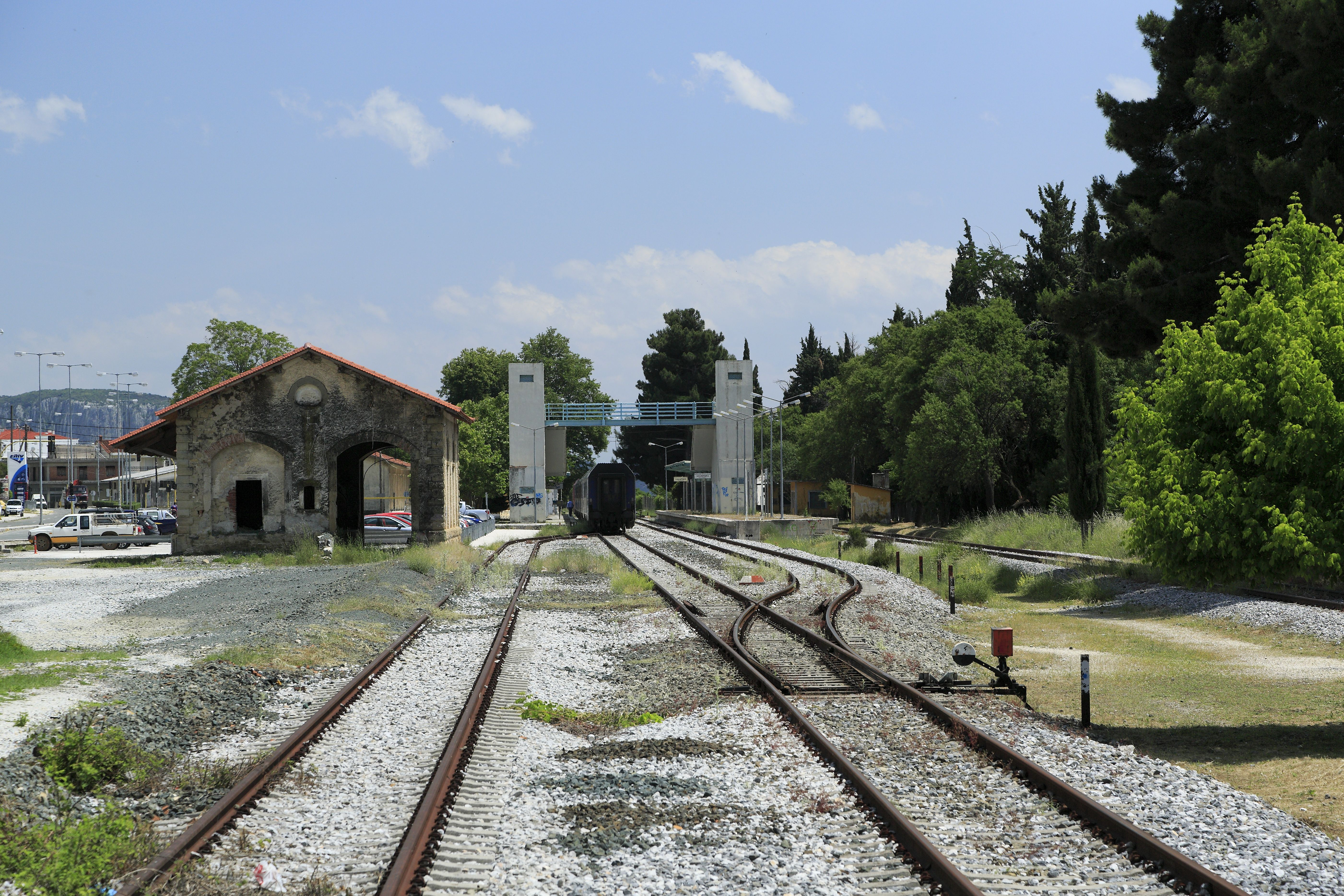
Kalambaka railway station, taken from just in front of the buffers at the end of line 24 May 2016

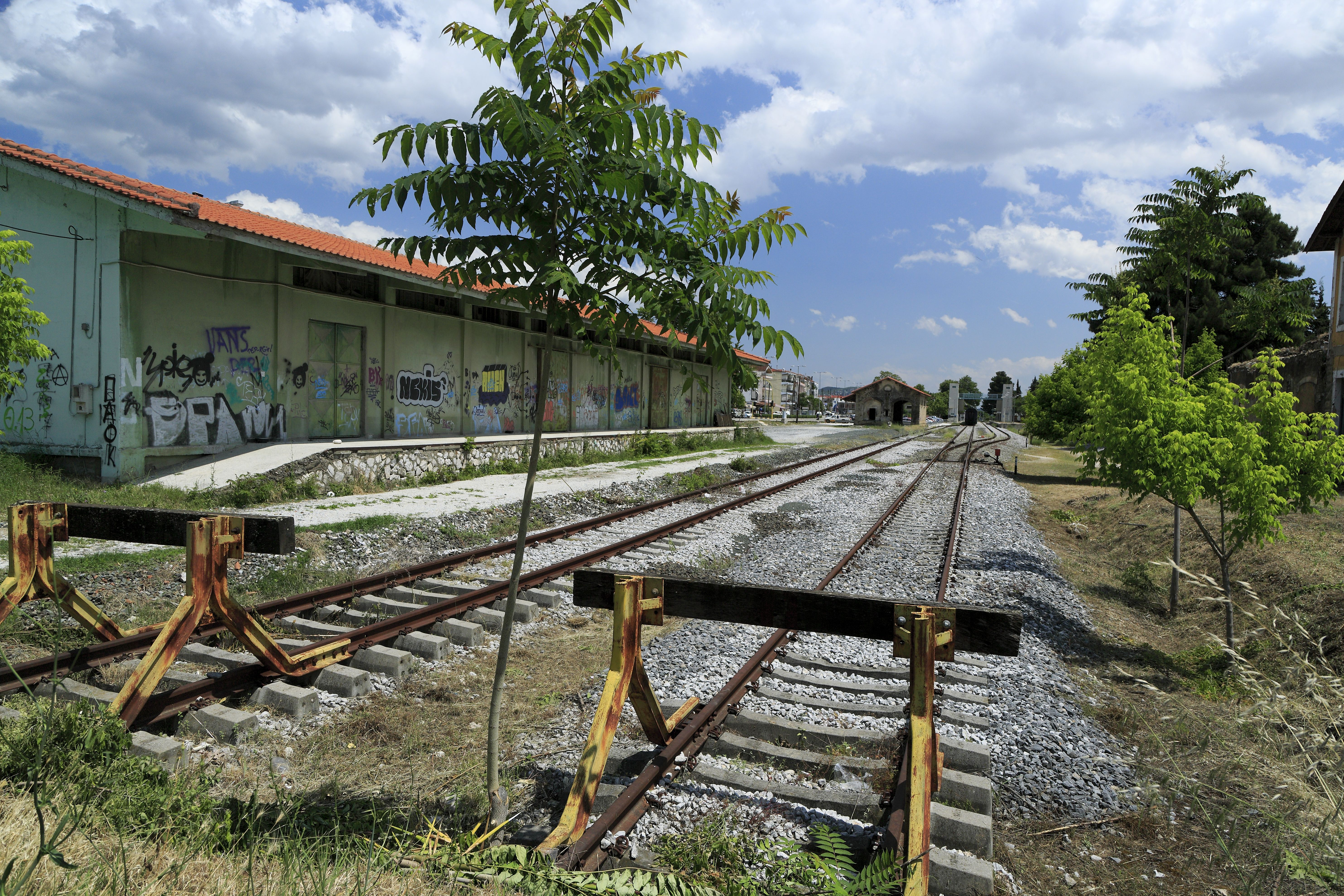
End of the line of the Palaiofarsalos-Kalambaka railway 24 May 2016

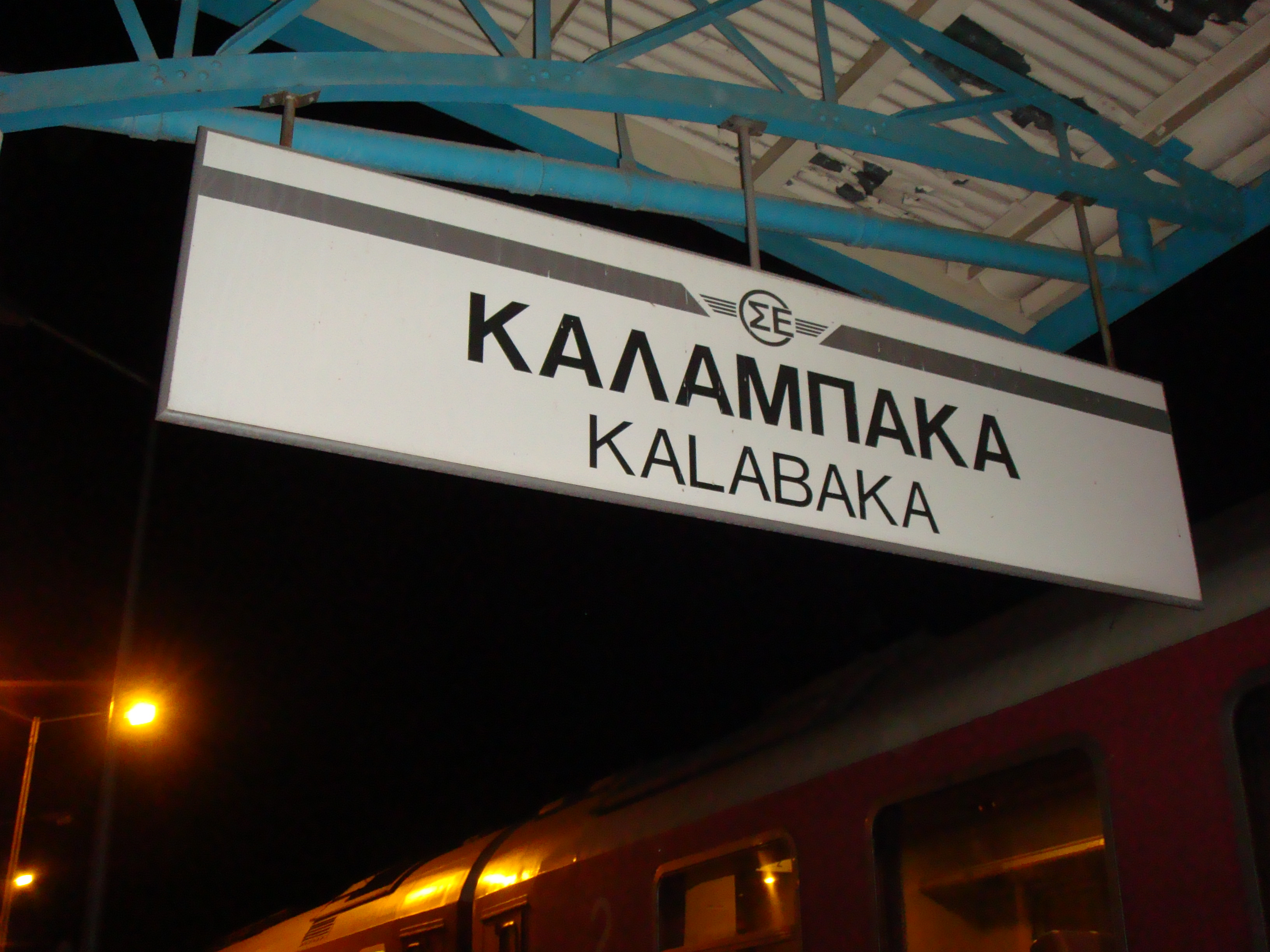
The Sign at Kalambaka railway station, still sporting the old OSE logo 2007

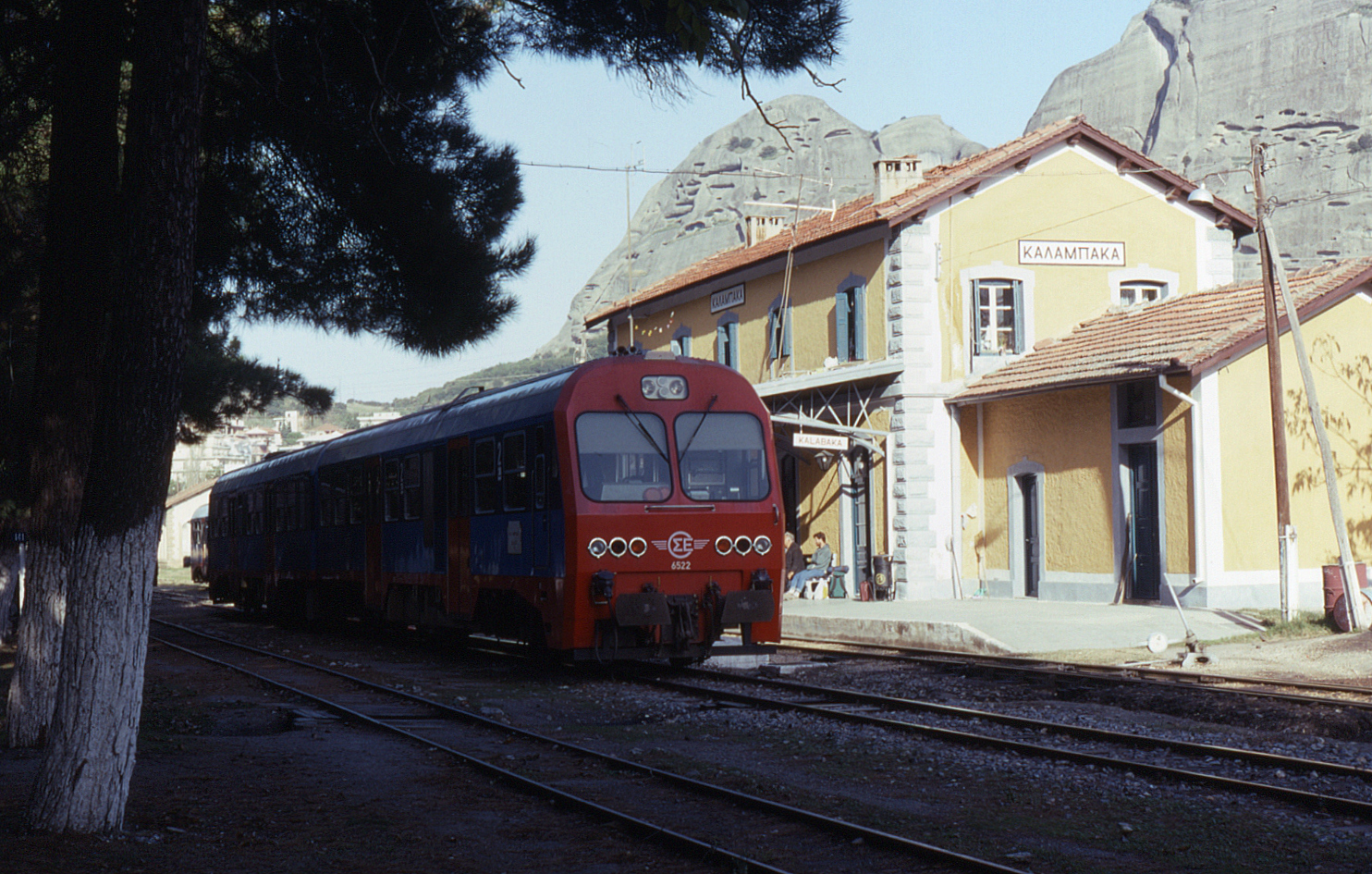
Thessaly Metre gauge system in central Greece from Volos to Kalabáka (or Kalambaka) was covered during a visit to the country in November 1992. Having spent the night here, the first move on 7 November 1992 was retracing our route as far as the junction station of Paleofarsalos. Seen here is German-built 2-car DMU no. A.6522 on train 1845, 09:40 Kalambaka to Volos. Note the rock formations in the background, which are a major tourist attraction in the area.
