= Kalabaka =

Town in Thessaly, Greece

Kalabaka Καλαμπάκα
- Municipal unit
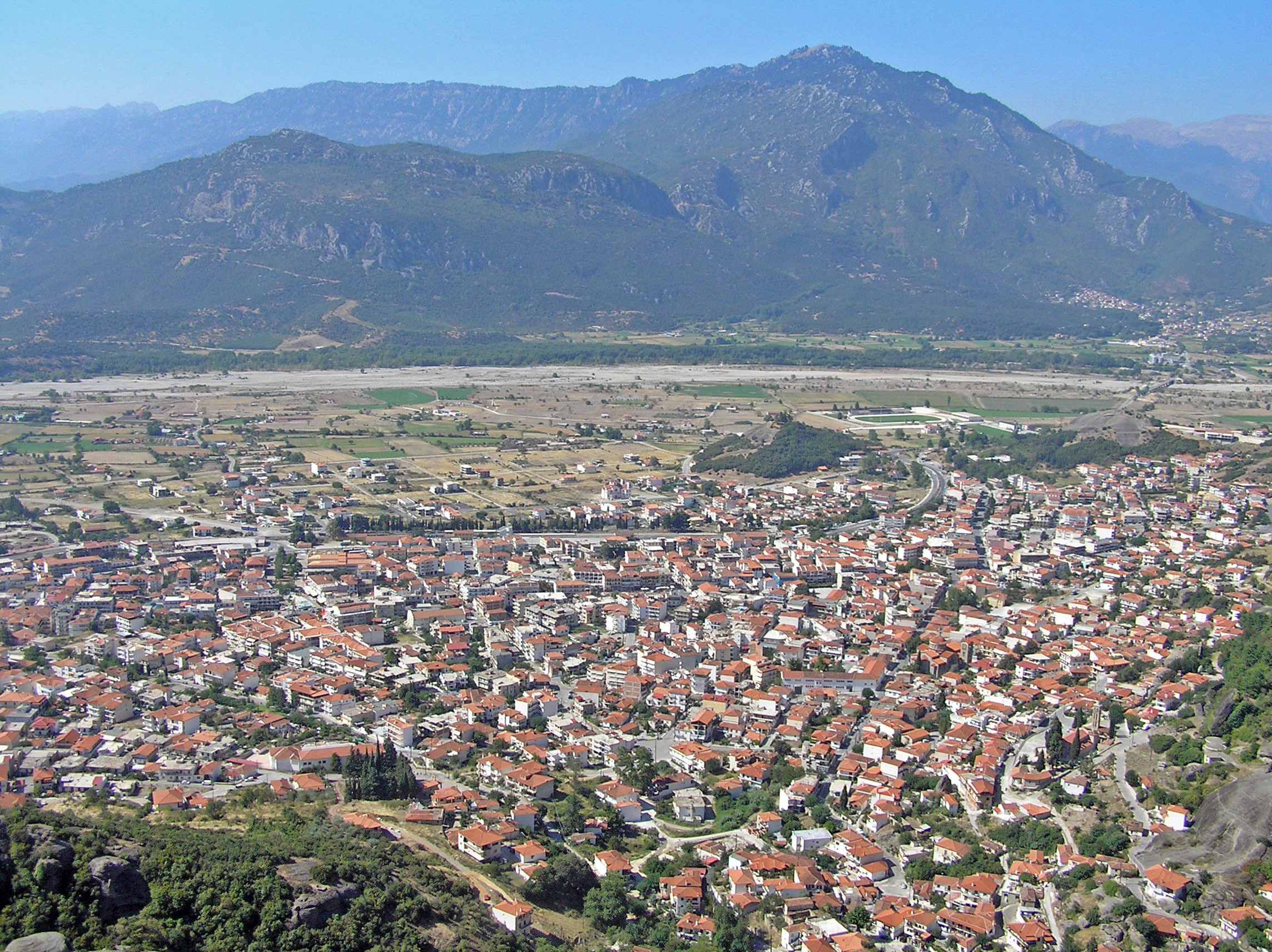
- The town of Kalabaka as seen from Meteora.

- Location within Greece
- Coordinates: 39°42′29″N 21°37′42″E
- Country: Greece
- Administrative region: Thessaly
- Regional unit: Trikala
- Municipality: Meteora

Area
  - Municipal unit: 277.1 km^{2} (107.0 sq mi)

Population (2021)
  - Municipal unit: 11,492
  - Municipal unit density: 41.47/km^{2} (107.4/sq mi)
  - Community: 8,573
- Time zone: UTC+2 (EET)
  - Summer (DST): UTC+3 (EEST)
- Vehicle registration: ΤΚ

Kalabaka (Greek: Καλαμπάκα, Kalabáka, alternative transliterations are Kalambaka and Kalampaka) is a town and seat of the municipality of Meteora in the Trikala regional unit, part of Thessaly in Greece. The population was 11,492 at the 2021 census, of which 8,573 in the town proper. The Meteora monasteries are located near the town. Kalabaka is the northwestern terminal of the old Thessaly Railways, now part of OSE.

== History ==
A Greek inscription on the wall of one of the town's oldest churches (Saint John the Baptist) testifies to the existence of an ancient Greek settlement under the name Aiginion.

In the 10th century AD, it was known as Stagoi (Σταγοί), a Byzantine fortress and bishopric (the name is still in use for the town by the Greek Orthodox Church). Of its medieval monuments, only the cathedral, the Church of the Dormition, survives. It was a late 11th or early 12th-century building, built on the remains of an earlier, late antique church. Relics of an ancient Greek temple – probably of god Apollo – have been incorporated in the wall of the town's oldest and most renowned church, dedicated to the Virgin Mary.

Stagoi is first mentioned in Diatyposis written by the Byzantine Emperor Leo VI the Wise (886-912). In 1163 there was a reference to the castle of Stagoi. In 1204 Stagoi fell under the Despotate of Epirus. At the end of the 13th century they fell under the Duchy of Neopatria. In 1334, they were taken over once more by the Despot of Epirus, John II Orsini, and shortly thereafter they came once more under the control of the Byzantine Empire. In 1348, they were conquered by the Serbs of Stephen Dushan. They reached their peak under the rule of his brother, King Simeon Uroš. When the Ottomans conquered Thessaly, Kalabaka was placed under the administrative rule of the Pasha of Larisa and later on of the Sanjak of Trikala.

It was named "Kalabaka" six or seven centuries ago. It is of Turkish origin and means "powerful fortress". It has been Anglicized variously as Kalampaka, Kalambaka or Kalabaki.

=== Bishopric history ===
From the beginning of the 10th century, Stagoi was referred to as an episcopal see, thereby enjoying privileges and donations from the Byzantine emperors throughout the Middle Ages. It owned significant stretches of land and had dependent farmers in neighboring settlements. Besides the fields of northwest Thessaly, its territory included an extensive mountainous zone in Asia and central Pindos. The bishopric of Stagoi, a suffragan of the Metropolis of Larissa, was maintained, with some small intermissions, up to 1900 when it was merged with the bishopric of Tricca to form the Metropolis of Tricca and Stagoi with the town of Trikala as its seat. It was reestablished in 1991, and has been operating ever since as the Metropolis of "Stagoi and Meteora" with its seat in the town of Kalabaka.

=== Province ===
The province of Kalabaka (Greek: Επαρχία Καλαμπάκας) was one of the provinces of the Trikala Prefecture. It had the same territory as the present municipality of Meteora. It was abolished in 2006.

== Transport ==
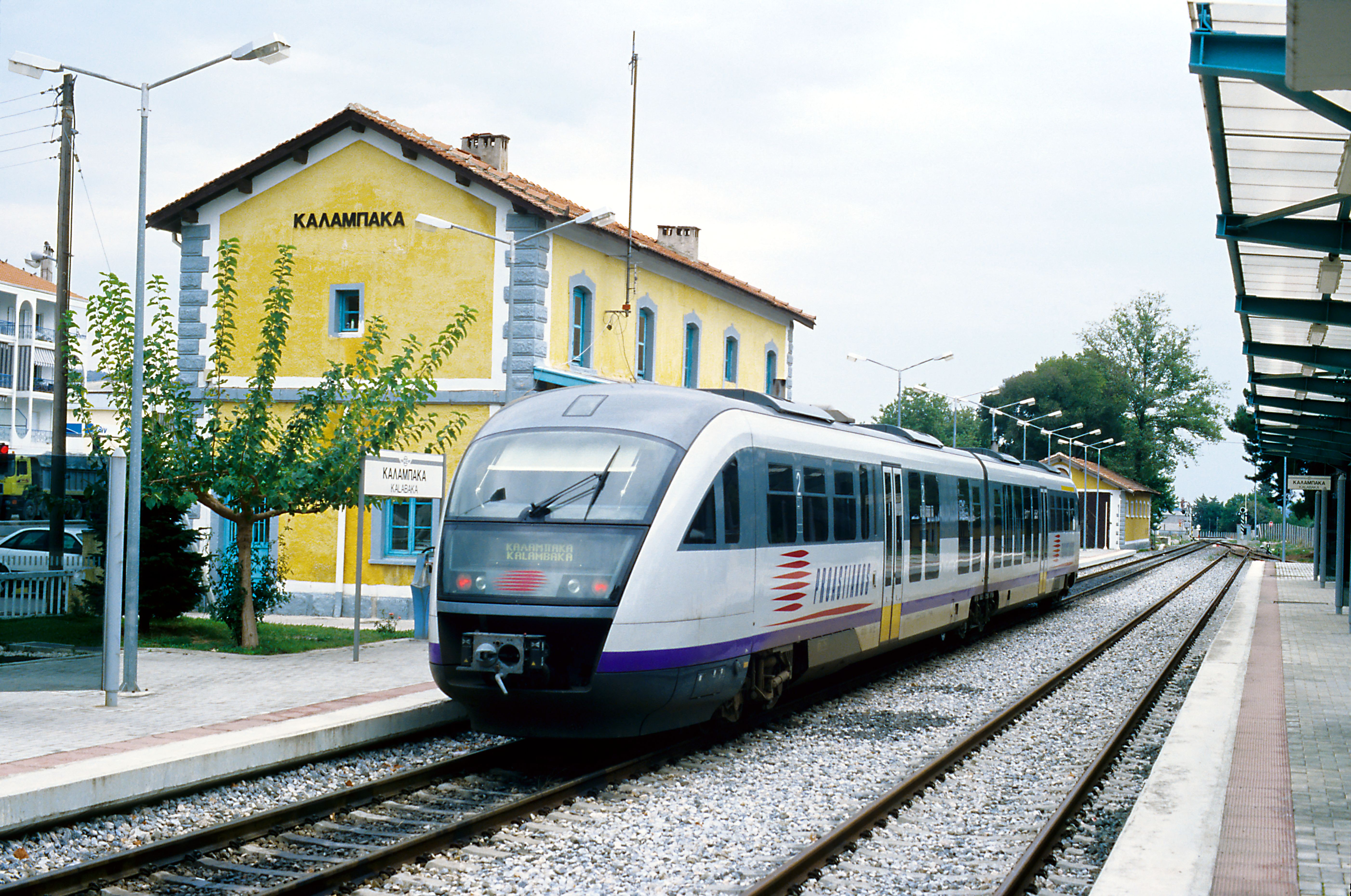
Kalambaka railway station

The city is served by Kalambaka station on the Palaiofarsalos-Kalambaka line.

== Geography ==
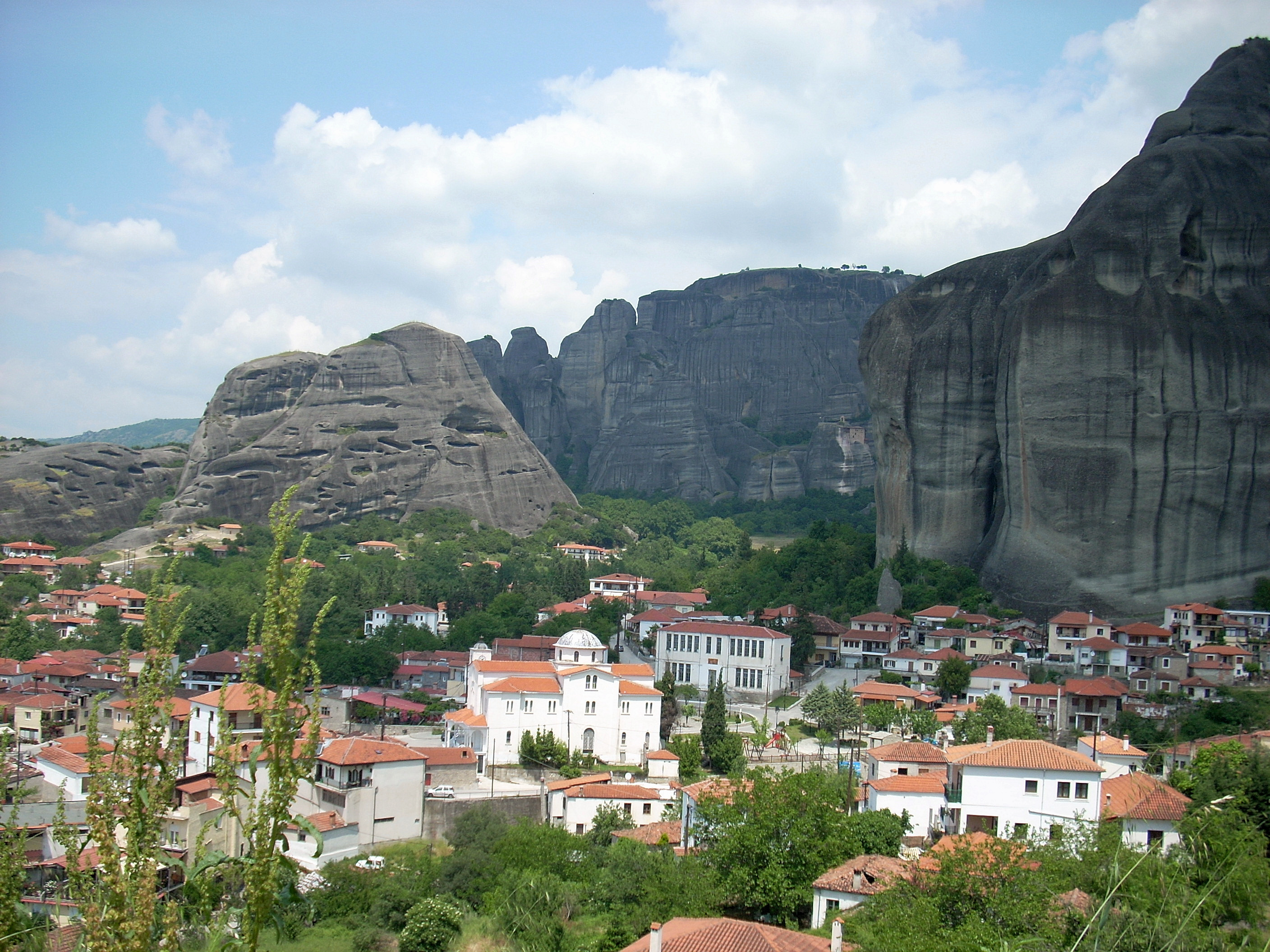
View of Meteora from Kastraki, a community of Kalabaka on the west side of the massif. Partly visible on the right-hand side of the picture is Holy Spirit Rock.

The town is situated at the foot of the Meteora massif, a region of sandstone outcrops formed by weathering along criss-cross faults in the foothills of the Chasia Mountains between Thessaly and Macedonia. Evidently an old delta was indurated and raised during orogenesis of the region with a high degree of faulting. Drainage was into the Pineios River Valley.

The entire Meteora massif belongs to one municipal unit, Kalabaka. The city is located at the foot of the massif on the SW side of the massif, which happens to be on the left, or northern, bank of the river, which flows N-S there. The settlements and communities of the municipal unit, named after villages, divide the massif. The other seven municipal units surround Kalabaka, but are not in the massif.

== Government ==
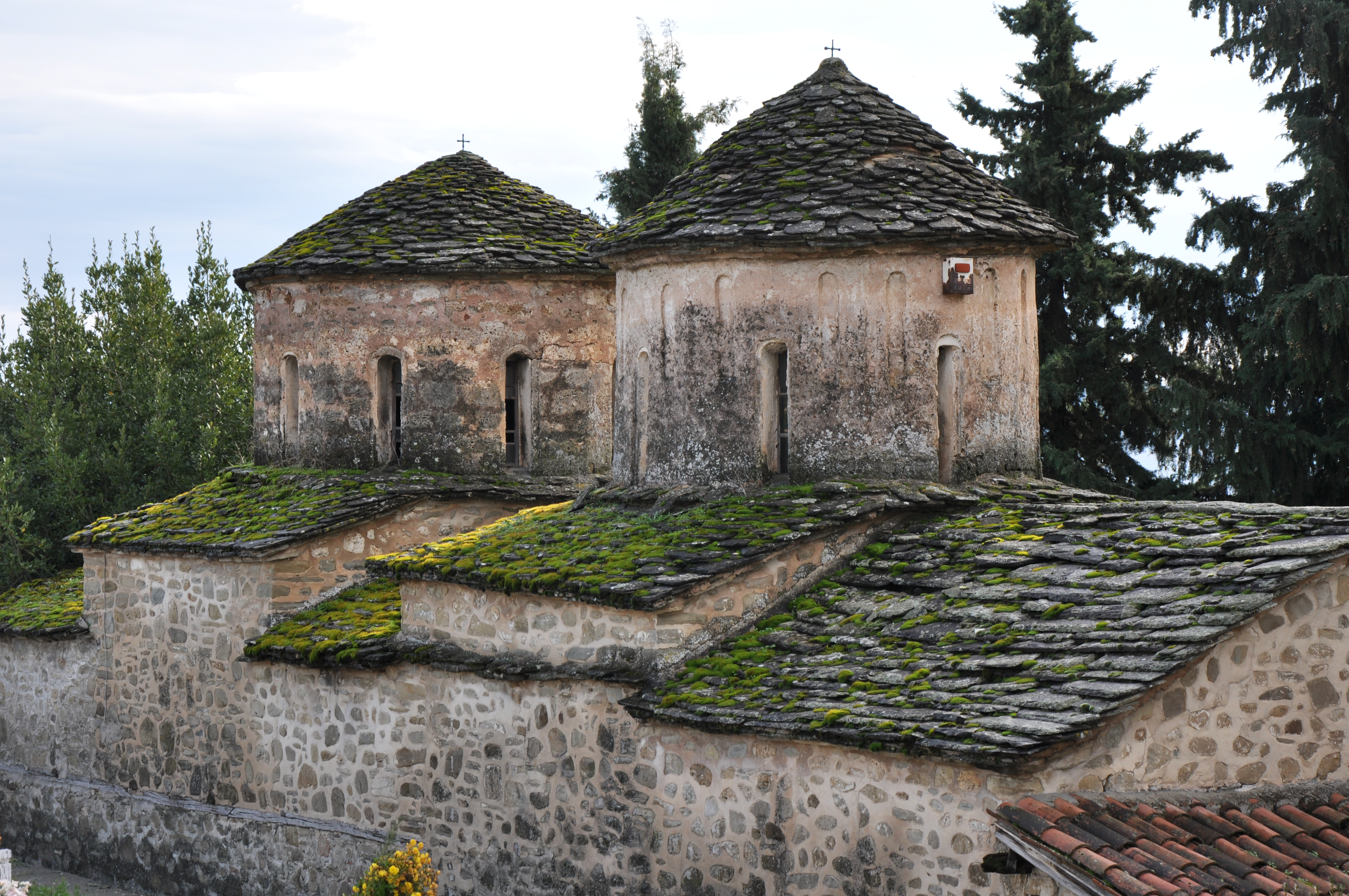
Church of St George Oxyneias (15th century)

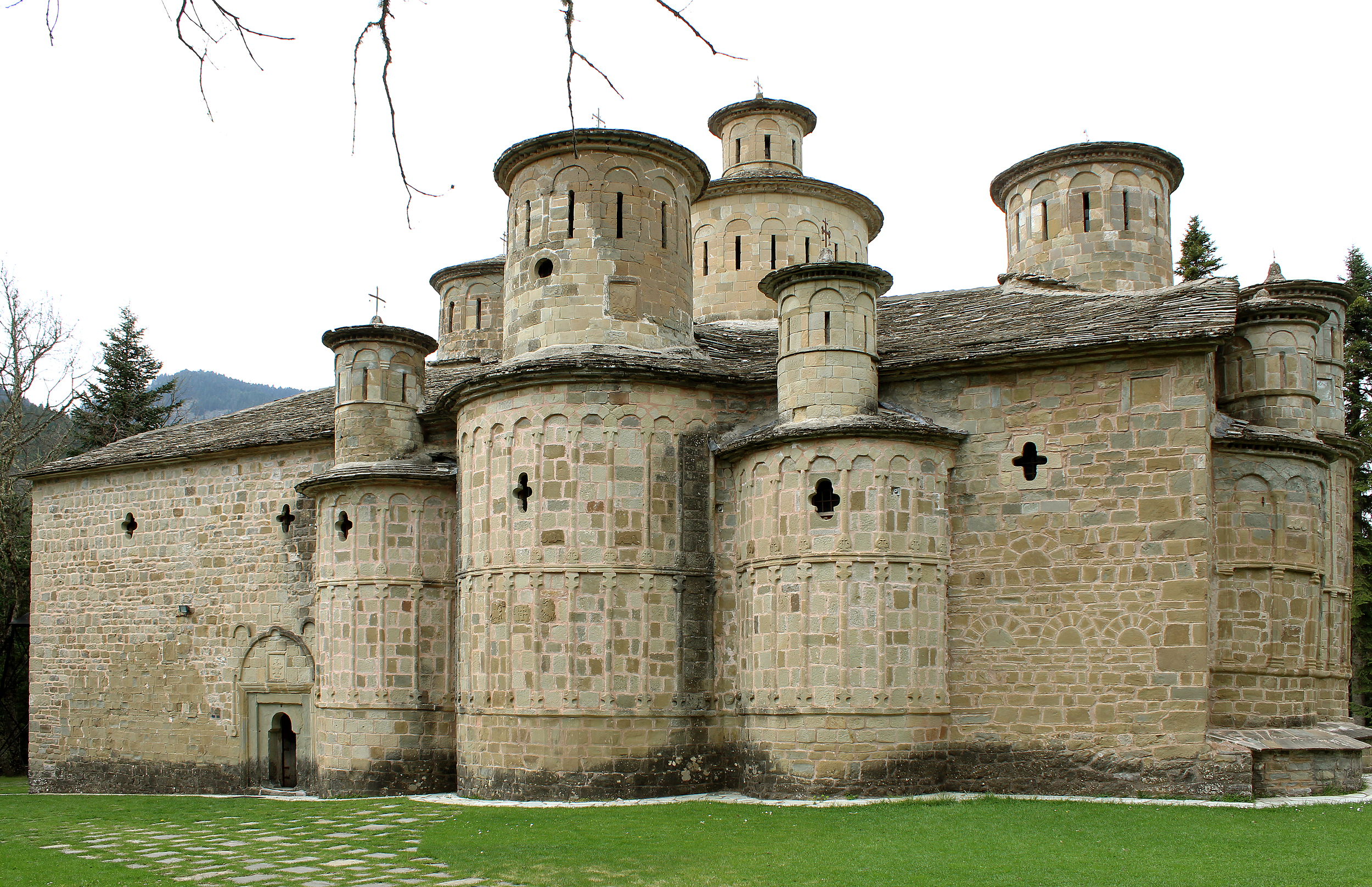
Holy Cross Monastery in Doliana, municipality of Meteora (17-18th century)

The governmental status of Kalabaka has varied somewhat in the 21st century. In the reforms of 2011 it became a Municipality. However, in 2018 the name of the new municipality was changed to Meteora, while its seat was made Kalabaka, now a municipal unit. Subdivisions of the Kalabaka Municipality now had to become communities of Kalabaka Municipal Unit.

In summary, Kalampaka is a municipal unit of the municipality of Meteora. The municipal unit of Kalampaka has an area of 277.087 km^{2}. It consists of the following communities (constituent settlements in parentheses):

- Avra (Avra, Nea Zoi)
- Diava (Diava, Koromilia)
- Kalabaka (Kalabaka, Agia Paraskevi, Vitoumas)
- Kastraki
- Krya Vrysi (Krya Vrysi, Trifyllia)
- Megali Kerasea (Megali Kerasea, Mourgkani)
- Orthovouni
- Sarakina
- Vlachava

== Twin towns ==
Kalampaka has three twin towns:

- Schwabach, Germany
- Le Haillan, France
- Mioveni, Romania

== Notable people ==
- Kostas Fortounis, professional footballer who was born in nearby Trikala but he and his family are from Kalabaka.
- Christos Albanis, professional footballer who was born in the town.
- Demoulas family, Greek-American supermarket business family whose founders, Athanasios and Efrosine Demoulas, were born in Kalabaka.

== Sources ==
- Richard Stillwell, William L. MacDonald, Marian Holland McAllister, Stillwell, Richard, MacDonald, William L., McAlister, Marian Holland, Aiginion, in The Princeton Encyclopedia of Classical Sites.
- A. Avramea, I Vyzantini Thessalia mechri tou 1204 [Byzantine Thessaly up to 1204], doctoral dissertation, Athens 1974, EKPA-Vivliothiki Sofias N. Saripolou 27, Athens 1974, pp. 158–161.
- V. Spanos, Istoria-Prosopographia tis BD. Thessalias to B' miso tou ID' aiona. [History-Portrait of NW Thessaly the 2nd half of the 14th c.], Larisa 1995
- Vogiatzidis, I. (1925). "To chronikon ton Meteoron" [The Chronicle of Meteora]. Yearbook of Society for Byzantine Studies (in Greek). 2: 149–162.
- Sofianos, D. (1993). "Acta Stagorum, Ta yper tis Thessalikis episkopis Stagon palaia vyzantina eggrafa (ton eton 1163, 1336 kai 1393)" [Acta Stagorum: the Byzantine documents for the Thessalic diocese of Stagai [from the years 1163, 1336 and 1393)]. Trikalina (in Greek). 13: 7–67.
- Aristarchis, St. (1867). "Ekthesis epi ton diagonismaton Thessalias kai Epirou" [Report on the examinations in Epirus and Thessaly]. O en Konstantinoupolei Ellinikos Filologikos Syllogos (in Greek) (13–15): 31–39.
- Heuzey, L.; Daumet, H. (1876). Mission archéologique de Macédoine. Paris. pp. 452–454.
- L.Heuzey, Odoiporiko stin Tourkokratoumeni Thessalia to 1858 [Excursion dans la Thessalie turque en 1858], transl. Ch. Dimitropoulos, publ. Afoi Kyriakidi, Thessaloniki 1991, pp. 152–157
- F. Dölger, Regesten der kaiserurkunden des oströmischen reiches von 565-1453, Verlag, München-Berlin 1960, pp. 159–160.
- Susta, P. (1976). Hunger, Η. (ed.). Hellas und Thessalia. TIB 1. Bonn: Österreichischen Akademie der Wissenschaften. p. 262.
- Astruc, Charles (1959). "Un document inédit de 1163 sur l' évêché thessalien, de Stagi, Paris.Suppl. Gr. 1371". Bulletin de Correspondance Hellénique. 83 (1): 206–246. doi:10.3406/bch.1959.2321.
