= Stefanovikeio railway station =

Railway station in Stefanovikeio, Thessaly, Greece

Στεφανοβίκειο Stefanovikeio

General information
- Location: Stefanovikeio; Magnesia; Greece
- Coordinates: 39°27′17″N 22°42′42″E
- Owner: GAIAOSE
- Operator: Hellenic Train
- Line: Larissa–Volos railway
- Platforms: 1
- Tracks: 1

Construction
- Structure type: at-grade
- Platform levels: 1
- Parking: No
- Cycle facilities: No

Other information
- Status: unstaffed
- Website: http://www.ose.gr/en/

History
- Opened: 22 April 1884; 142 years ago
- Electrified: No

Services
Preceding station	Hellenic Train	Following station
Armenio towards Larissa	G4 Larissa-Volos	Velestino towards Volos
Former services
Preceding station	Thessaly Railways	Following station
Armenio towards Larissa	Larissa–Volos	Rizomylos towards Volos
Location
- Location within Greece

Stefanovikeio railway station (Greek: Σιδηροδρομικός Σταθμός Στεφανοβικείου, romanized: Sidirodromikos Stathmos Stefanovikeiou) is a railway station in Stefanovikeio, Thessaly, Greece. It is located outside the settlement, pretty close to a level crossing. Opened on 22 April 1884 by the Thessaly Railways (now part of OSE). Today Hellenic Train operates fourteen (14) daily local trains to Larissa and Volos.

== History ==
The station was opened on 22 April 1884 by the Thessaly Railways (now part of OSE). The line was designed by the Italian Evaristo de Chirico, (father of Giorgio de Chirico) soon after the liberation of Central Greece from the Ottomans. In 1960 the line from Larissa to Volos was converted to standard gauge and connected at Larissa with the mainline from Athens to Thessaloniki, allowing OSE to run through services to Volos from Athens and Thessaloniki. In 1955 Thessaly Railways was absorbed into Hellenic State Railways (SEK). In 1960 the line from Larissa to Volos was converted to standard gauge and connected though Larissa to the mainline from Athens to Thessaloniki, allowing OSE to run through services to Volos from Athens and Thessaloniki. In 1970 OSE became the legal successor to the SEK, taking over responsibilities for most of Greece's rail infrastructure.

In 2001 the infrastructure element of OSE was created, known as GAIAOSE; it would henceforth be responsible for the maintenance of stations, bridges and other elements of the network, as well as the leasing and the sale of railway assists. In 2005, TrainOSE was created as a brand within OSE to concentrate on rail services and passenger interface.

In 2009, with the Greek debt crisis unfolding OSE's Management was forced to reduce services across the network. Timetables were cut back, and routes closed as the government-run entity attempted to reduce overheads. In 2017 OSE's passenger transport sector was privatised as TrainOSE, currently a wholly owned subsidiary of Ferrovie dello Stato Italiane. Infrastructure, including stations, remained under the control of OSE.

In May 2022, INTRAKAT was given the go-ahead for the €82.890.000 electrification and signalling upgrades of the Larissa–Volos line, due for completion in 2025. In July 2022, the station began being served by Hellenic Train, the rebranded TranOSE

On the 5 September 2023, Storm Daniel triggered largescale flooding in Thessaly. The rail infrastructure was badly affected in the region, cutting on both Regional and Intercity routes as significant parts of the infrastructure were washed away. OSE engineers were on the ground in the worst affected areas Domokos, Doxaras, and Paleofarsalos to assess the extent of the damage, and prepare detailed reports, and seek financial assistance from the European Union. 50 km (31 mi) of tracks was completely destroyed

Repairing the extensive damage, was estimated at between 35 and 45 million euros. OSE managing director, Panagiotis Terezakis, spoke of reconstruction works reaching 50 million euros, confirming at the same time that there will be no rail traffic in the effected sections of the network for at least a month. The devastation goes beyond the tracks and signalling, affecting costly equipment such as the European Train Control System (ETCS), which enhances rail safety.

The line from Volos to Larissa was damaged, with extensive work needed to repair the line and resume services. Services between Larissa and Volos remain suspended across Thessaly’s coast until the track is repaired, with a rail-replacement bus in operation.

== Facilities ==
The station is little more than a halt, with only a small brick-built building on a raised platform, no disabled access is available this station.

== Services ==
As of September 2026, the regional train that usually runs between Larissa and Volos is suspended due to flood mitigation works: a rail replacement bus service runs parallel to the route, but currently does not call at this station.
