= Mezourlo railway station =

Railway station in Larissa, Greece

Μεζούρλο Mezourlo

General information
- Location: Larissa 413 35; Larissa; Greece
- Coordinates: 39°37′07″N 22°24′26″E
- Owner: GAIAOSE
- Line: Regional Piraeus–Platy railway
- Platforms: 1
- Tracks: 15
- Train operators: Hellenic Train

Construction
- Structure type: at-grade
- Platform levels: 1
- Parking: No
- Cycle facilities: No

Other information
- Status: Unstaffed
- Website: www.ose.gr/en/

History
- Electrified: 25 kV AC, 50 Hz
Former services
Preceding station	Thessaly Railways	Following station
Larissa Terminus	Larissa–Volos	Chalki towards Volos
Location
- Location within Greece

Mezourlo railway station (Greek: Σιδηροδρομικός σταθμός Μεζούρλου, romanized: Sidirodromikós stathmós Mezourlo) is a station on the Piraeus–Platy railway line, located in Larissa, Greece. The unstaffed station is located just southwest of Larissa station, next to a large OSE maintenance depot.

== History ==
In 1955 Thessaly Railways, faced with huge financial obligations was absorbed into Hellenic State Railways (SEK). In 1970 OSE became the legal successor to the SEK, taking over responsibilities for most of Greece's rail infrastructure.

In 2009, with the Greek debt crisis unfolding OSE's Management was forced to reduce services across the network. Timetables were cut back, and routes closed as the government-run entity attempted to reduce overheads. In 2017 OSE's passenger transport sector was privatised as TrainOSE, currently a wholly owned subsidiary of Ferrovie dello Stato Italiane infrastructure, including stations, remained under the control of OSE.

In May 2021, a tender process for the installation of noise barriers along railway lines that cross Larissa (that includes the section Mezourlo station) was announced. The project, €5.9 million (without VAT), is the construction of sound curtains in partial locations of the railway corridor and within the urban fabric Larissa, from Mezourlos station to the bridge of the river Pinios, along the railway 10 kilometres (6.2 mi), with sound curtains taking up 4.8 kilometres (3.0 mi) and additional trackside fencing coving the remaining 3.2 kilometres (2.0 mi). The project, €5.9 million The Contracting of the project, which is co-financed by a regional program of the Region of Thessaly, is estimated within 2021 and the contractual time of its implementation in around 18 months.

== Facilities ==
The unstaffed station has waiting rooms and a single platform. There are no taxi ranks or parking facilities at the station.

=== Depo ===
There is a large maintenance depot located adjacent to the station The OSE facilities occupy an area of about 280 acres (1.8% of the city). In recent years, the site has become overground with resting wagons and disused rolling stock left to rust and be vandalised. In January 2021 it was announced that the resting trains, which have become a local eye saw would be moved.

== Services ==
The station is served the following Hellenic Train services:

- Regional services to Thessaloniki and Palaiofarsalos.

Trains used to run Volos, but the new line was constructed to Kalambaka; these services were withdrawn.

== Accidents and incidents ==
=== 2010 incident ===
In 2010 to a 12-year-old boy was electrocuted at the station.

=== 2017 incident ===
On 14 October 2017 a 15-year-old student Konstantinos Babaniaris, was "struck by lightning" by the aerial power lines that pass through the station. After a week of hospitalization, he succumbed to his injuries. He was later commemorated in a song, by Vassilis Babaniaris, with Lyrics from Konstantinos Babaniaris called The Bridge (2020), commissioned by his family. In September 2021 an 18-month prison sentence (with a three-year suspension) was issued on the two former OSE superiors.

=== 2020 incident ===
On 30 December 2020, an 18-year-old woman was 'hit' by an electrical discharge from overhead wires. The woman, who was not named received around 25,000 volts was transported by ambulance to the hospital with burns over 70% of her body, while a boy who was with her did not suffer injuries.

== Station Layout ==
Ground level		Exit
Level; Ε1	Side platform, doors will open on the right/left
Level; Ε1	Platform 1Α	→ towards Thessaloniki (Larissa) →
Level; Ε1	Platform 1Β	→ towards Palaiofarsalos (Kranonas) ←

== Migration Criss ==
In August 2018, Dozens of migrants wanted to travel illegally, who even put their lives in danger by jumping from an OSE train while it was in motion when it arrived at the Mezourlos railway station. At least 30 migrants smuggled on the OSE commercial train transporting wheat from Thessaloniki to Karditsa, Shortly after 11:00 9 Aug while the train was arriving at Mezourlos station, the dozens of migrants were spotted by the OSE staff, with the result that one by one they jumped from the wagons while the train was still in motion. When the train came to a standstill at the station, the Police were called, whose officers brought in at least 11 migrants who were then released as it was found that they were immigrants who had applied for asylum. The practice of foreign nationals travelling illegally on commercial trains is widespread, and accidents on the rail network are frequent. To date, there have been a number of deaths of smugglers who were struck by lightning from the OSE electricity network, while recently, a foreign national lost his life after amputation. The young migrant was trapped between two wagons while trying to jump off the train when it slowed down while entering Larissa at the height of Aerodromiou Street.

== See also ==
- Railways of Greece
- Hellenic Railways Organization
- Hellenic Train
