= Velestino-Kalampaka railway =

Disused Greek railway line

Velestinou–Kalambaka railway

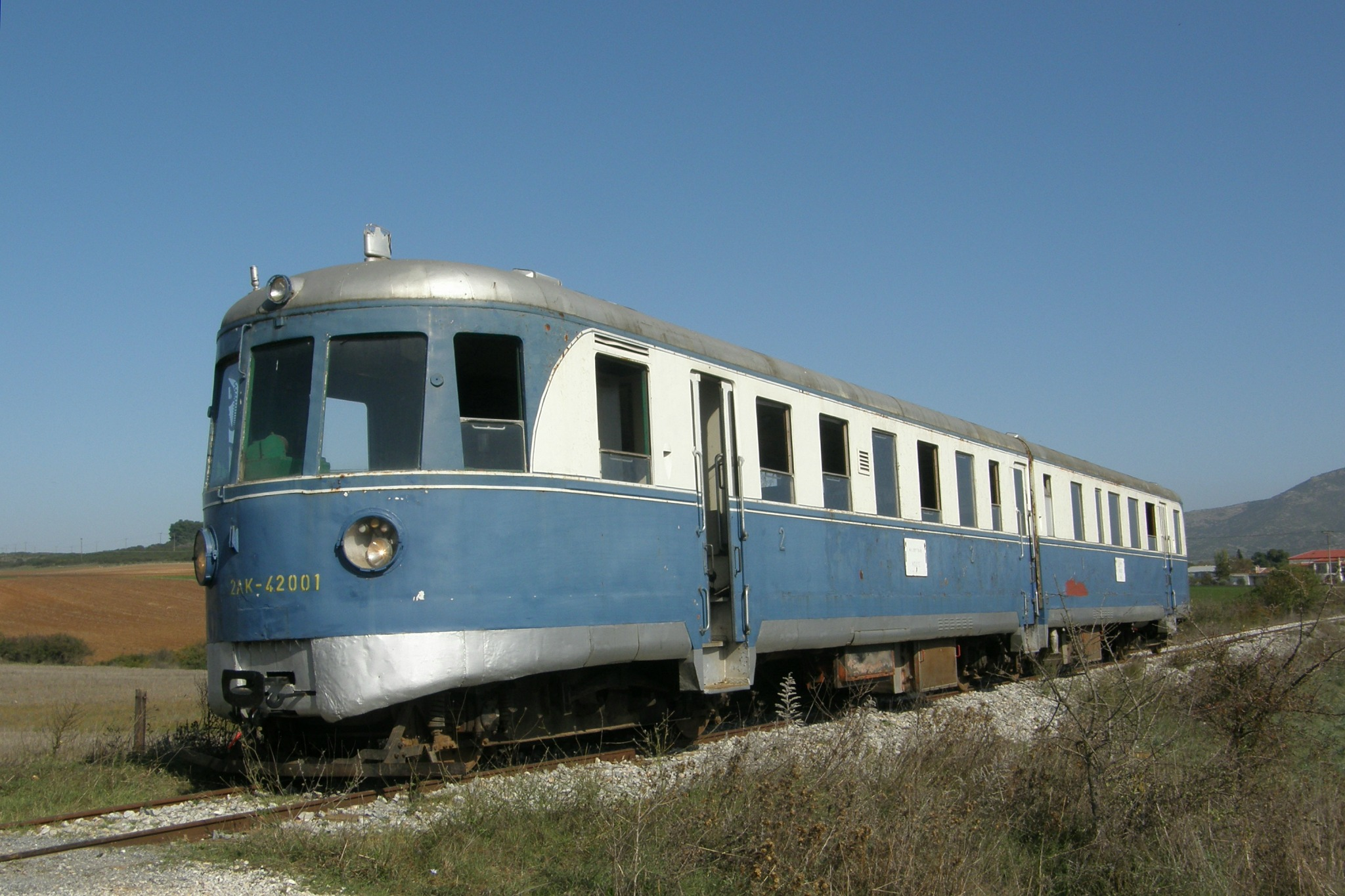
- A DMU-2 trainset 4201 (formerly 2AK420.01 of SPAP) near Aerinos railway station, 2008

Overview
- Status: Party disused
- Owner: Thessaly Railways/GAIAOSE
- Locale: Greece Central Greece,
- Termini: Velestino 39.3901°N 22.7597°E; Kalambaka 39.7030°N 21.6254°E
- Stations: 25 (1955)

Service
- Type: Regional railway
- Rolling stock: DMU-2 trainset

History
- Opened: 1884
- Closed: 1999 (partly)

Technical
- Line length: 142 km (88 mi)
- Track length: 1,000 mm (Metre-gauge)
- Number of tracks: single-track railway
- Character: Secondary
- Track gauge: 1,000 mm (3 ft 3 3/8 in) metre gauge
- Operating speed: 90 km/h (56 mph) (average)

The Velestino–Kalambaka railway (Greek: Σιδηροδρομική γραμμή Βελεστίνου - Καλαμπάκας, romanized: Sidirodromikí grammí Velestino - Kalambákas) was an unelectrified Metre-gauge single-track railway regional railway line that connected Velestino in Central Greece, with Kalampaka. The Line has been converted to standard gauge (1435 mm), however, several stations have since closed, and while the line is still (mostly) operational, trains no longer connect Velestino with Kalampaka, via Palaiofarsalos.

== Course ==
The line from Velestino–Kalampaka was 1,000 mm (3 ft 3 3/8 in) metre gauge width, with a length of 142 km that connected Velestino in Magnesia with Kalampaka in Trikala, crossing the whole southern and western Thessaly (its western terminus). It was one of the two lines of the Thessaly Railways private-owned company (the other being the Larissa-Volos line). The connection with the Athens-Larissa-Thessaloniki standard gauge mainline at Palaiofarsalos had a maximum gradient of 3% between Velestinon and Aerinon.

== History ==
On 13 May 1882, One year after the annexation of Thessaly to Greece Charilaos Trikoupis (Prime Minister and Minister of the Interior) signed a contract with a representative of Theodoros Mavrokordatos (a banker from Constantinople) for the construction of a 1,000 mm (3 ft 3 3/8 in) metre gauge railway from Volos to Kalambaka via Velestinos. With the passing of law AMH'/22.6.1882, the construction works began on what would be Velestino–Kalambaka railway. The line opened in 1884, with the completed section to Kalambaka opening on 16 June 1886 The line was authorised by the Greek government under the law AMH’/22.6.1882. soon after the liberation of Central Greece from the Ottomans. The line was designed by the Italian Evaristo de Chirico, (father of Giorgio de Chirico).

In just the second year of its operation, the line proved in another way its usefulness and its important role in Thessaly. During the hostilities of the Greek-Turkish war, in the spring of 1897, the railway transported numerous troops, both within Thessaly and to the borders, closely cooperating with the Greek Army. The passenger and freight carriages accommodated and transported the soldiers and wounded of the war, as well as supplies necessary for the Red Cross. Also, on the initiative of the S.Th., the refugees of the war were accommodated and fed at the stations of the network.

After 1900, the railway took over the handling of the mail of Thessalian towns and villages, speeding up delivery and increasing reliability. To this end, stations were now equipped with post offices, where stamps were also sold.

The network suffered extensive infrastructure and rolling stock damage during World War II and Greek civil war but would recover once more, continuing to deliver, albeit at a reduced rate.

In 1960 the line from Larissa to Volos was converted to standard gauge and connected at Larissa with the mainline from Athens to Thessaloniki, allowing OSE to run through services to Volos from Athens and Thessaloniki. In 1955 Thessaly Railways was absorbed into Hellenic State Railways (SEK). In 1960, the line from Larissa to Volos was converted to standard gauge and connected through Larissa to the mainline from Athens to Thessaloniki, allowing OSE to run through services to Volos from Athens and Thessaloniki. Volos station was converted to dual gauge to accommodate trains of the two branches. Parts of the station and the track towards the city centre were at this period of a unique triple-gauge system: standard gauge for Larissa trains, metre gauge for Kalambaka trains and 600 mm gauge for Pellon trains. In 1970 OSE became the legal successor to the SEK, taking over responsibilities for most of Greece's rail infrastructure.

In 1919, the Greek president of the Board of Directors of the Railways of Thessaly, A. Vlagalis, proposed to expand the Volos-Kalambakas line to international scope and to extend it north to Avlona to join the Adriatic railway, which at the time it seemed that Italy would build. In 1926, the Greek state allowed the widening of the line and its extension, but the GES reacted, and the project abandoned. From a publication in the Trikala newspaper "Tharros" we assume that the GES proposed that the international line should not go from Trikala to Volos, but follow, for military reasons, a mountainous route to Mesenicola, Kastania, Fourna and from there to reach Lianokladi. In 1955 Thessaly Railways was absorbed into Hellenic State Railways (SEK).

In 1960 the line from Larissa to Volos was converted to standard gauge and connected through Larissa to the mainline from Athens to Thessaloniki, allowing OSE to run through services to Volos from Athens and Thessaloniki. Volos station was converted to dual gauge in order to accommodate trains of the two branches. Thus, the former network of S.Th. is now limited to the Volos - Kalambakas line. In 1970 OSE became the legal successor to the SEK, taking over responsibilities for most of Greece's rail infrastructure. The intense road competition from the developing national roads, the rise of the private car, and the ageing infrastructure of the line bring an inevitable reduction of the passenger public, while the commercial activity is now passing into other hands. The last major upgrade is made with the introduction of the new modern MAN 1/EN coaches into the network from 1990 onwards.

The line Velestinou-Kalampaka was closed in stages, with the section Velestino-Paleofarsalos ceasing operations in 1999, while in 2001, the section from Paleofarsalos to Kalampaka was converted to standard gauge (1435 mm), to facilitate a direct connection with the Athens–Thessaloniki line at Paleofarsalos. The tourist use of the line in the Velestino–Aerino section has been planned.

== Stations ==
- Velestino (return by line to Larissa and Volos)
- Velestino town
- Aerino
- Chalkodonion
- Rigion
- Dasolophon
- Sitochoron
- Farsala
- Evidion
- Enotiki
- Palaiofarsalos (to Athens and Thessaloniki)
- Stasis Sofadon
- Sofades
- Karditsa
- Stasis Issari
- Fanario
- Fanario Horio
- Magoula
- Kalyvia
- Drossero
- Trikala
- Kefalovrysso
- Vassiliki
- Theopetra
- Kalambaka
