= Rapsani railway station =

Railway station in Greece

Ραψάνη Rapsani
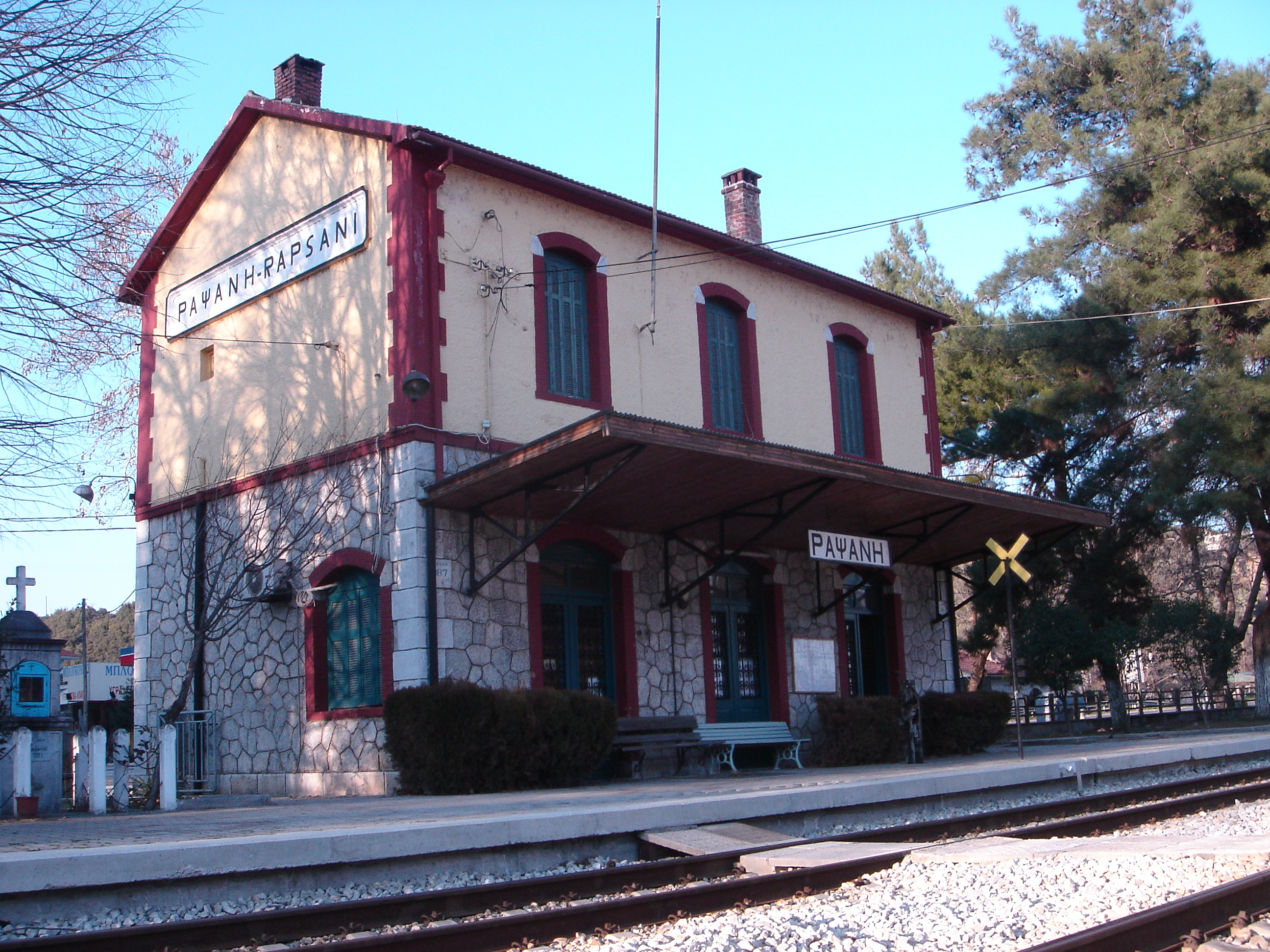
- Rapsani old station building, before electrification work, January 2005

General information
- Location: Sidirodromikos Stathmos Rapsanis 400 07; Larissa; Greece
- Coordinates: 39°53′59″N 22°36′53″E
- Elevation: 83.00 metres (272.31 ft)
- Owner: GAIAOSE
- Operator: Hellenic Train
- Line: Piraeus–Platy railway
- Distance: 151.7 kilometres (94.3 mi) from Thessaloniki
- Platforms: 2
- Tracks: 2
- Connections: Bus Bus

Construction
- Structure type: At Grade
- Platform levels: 1
- Parking: Yes
- Cycle facilities: Yes

Other information
- Status: Staffed
- Website: http://www.ose.gr/en/

History
- Opened: 1916
- Rebuilt: 7 September 2008; 18 years ago
- Electrified: 25 kV AC, 50 Hz
- Former names: Pyrgetos
- Original company: Evangelismos-Tempi-Rapsani railway

Services
Preceding station	Regional Rail	Following station
Larissa Terminus	Line T1	Neoi Poroi towards Thessaloniki
Former service
Preceding station	Thessaly Railways	Following station
Terminus	Larissa–Volos	Chalki towards Volos
Location
- Location within Greece

Rapsani railway station (Greek: Σιδηροδρομικός σταθμός Ραψάνης, Sidirodromikos stathmos Ραψάνη) is a railway station near the village of Rapsani, Thessaly, Greece. It is located about 5 kilometres (3.1 mi) from the centre of Rapsani and sits in the shadow of Mount Ossa. The station reopened on 7 September 2008 after renovations and upgrades to the line. The station is served by both fast Regional trains and Proastiakos to Thessaloniki. Intercity services pass through the station, but do not call at it. The station was formerly called Pyrgetos station because of the small village close to the station.

== History ==
The station was originally opened in 1916 as part of Evangelismos-Tempi-Rapsani railway; the station building dates from this period. In 1970, OSE became the legal successor to the SEK, taking over responsibilities for most of Greece's rail infrastructure. On 1 January 1971, the station and most of the Greek rail infrastructure were transferred to the Hellenic Railways Organisation S.A., a state-owned corporation. Freight traffic declined sharply when the state-imposed monopoly of OSE for the transport of agricultural products and fertilisers ended in the early 1990s. Many small stations of the network with little passenger traffic were closed down.

In 2001, the infrastructure element of OSE was created, known as GAIAOSE; it would henceforth be responsible for the maintenance, of stations, bridges and other elements of the network, as well as the leasing and the sale of railway assists. In 2003, OSE launched "Proastiakos SA", as a subsidiary to serve the operation of the suburban network in the urban complex of Athens during the 2004 Olympic Games. In 2004, the station and the line closed as part of the upgrades to the Piraeus–Platy Line. Rapsani, and a small section of the Evangelismos-Tempi-Rapsani Line was retained.

In 2005, TrainOSE was created as a brand within OSE to concentrate on rail services and passenger interface. Rapsani station reopened on 7 September 2008, as part of the rollout of Proastiakos services. In 2008, all Proastiakos were transferred from OSE to TrainOSE. Since 2008, the station is served by the Proastiakos Thessaloniki services to New Railway Station. In 2009, with the Greek debt crisis unfolding OSE's Management was forced to reduce services across the network. Timetables were cut back, and routes closed, as the government-run entity attempted to reduce overheads. In 2017 OSE's passenger transport sector was privatised as TrainOSE, currently, a wholly owned subsidiary of Ferrovie dello Stato Italiane infrastructure, including stations, remained under the control of OSE.

On 5 September 2023, Storm Daniel triggered largescale flooding in Thessaly. The rail infrastructure was badly affected in the region, cutting off both Regional and Intercity routes as significant parts of the infrastructure were washed away. OSE engineers were on the ground in the worst affected areas Domokos, Doxaras, and Paleofarsalos to assess the extent of the damage, and prepare detailed reports, and seek financial assistance from the European Union. 50 km (31 mi) of tracks was completely destroyed Repairing the extensive damage was estimated at between 35 and 45 million euros. OSE managing director, Panagiotis Terezakis, spoke of reconstruction works reaching 50 million euros, confirming at the same time that there will be no rail traffic in the effected sections of the network for at least a month. The devastation goes beyond the tracks and signalling, affecting costly equipment such as the European Train Control System (ETCS), which enhances rail safety. In November 2023, rail services resumed between Rapsani and Larissa following the devastating storm

== Facilities ==
The station is staffed, with a working Booking office (as of 2019) and waiting rooms. There are toilets. The platforms can be reached by a raised walkway accessed by stairs or lifts.

== Services ==
As of September 2026, the following weekday train services call at this station:

- Thessaloniki Regional Railway Line T1 between Thessaloniki and Larissa, with up to eight trains per day in each direction.

The Hellenic Train Intercity service between Athens and Thessaloniki does not call at this station.

== Accidents and incidents ==
On 28 February 2023, a passenger train and a freight train collided 10.9 kilometres (6.8 mi) south of the station, resulting in the deaths of at least 57 people and injuring dozens, making it the signal deadliest railway accident on record in Greece. 50 to 60 people are currently unaccounted for following the crash.

== Station layout ==
L Ground/Concourse	Customer service	Tickets/Exits
Level; L1	Side platform, doors will open on the right
Level; L1	Platform 1	← to Thessaloniki (Neoi Poroi)
Level; L1	Platform 2	to Larissa (terminus) →
Level; L1	Side platform, doors will open on the right
