= Velestino railway station =

Railway station in Velestino, Thessaly, Greece

Βελεστίνο Velestino
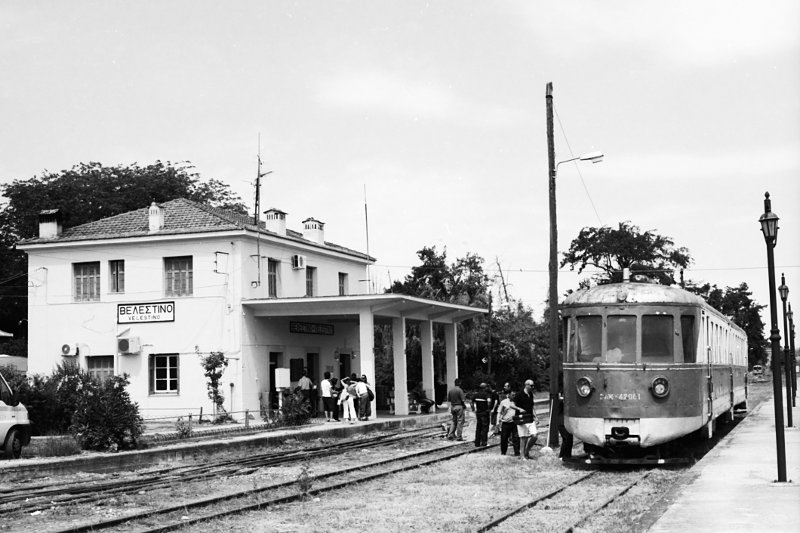
- A charter service with preserved metric DMU-2 trainset 4201 (formerly 2AK420.01 of Piraeus-Athens-Peloponnese railways) at Velestino station, Date Unknown.

General information
- Location: Velestino; Magnesia; Greece
- Coordinates: 39°23′24″N 22°45′35″E
- Owner: GAIAOSE
- Operator: Hellenic Train
- Line: Larissa–Volos railway
- Platforms: 5 (1 disused)
- Tracks: 6 (2 disused)

Construction
- Structure type: at-grade
- Parking: Yes

Other information
- Status: Unstaffed
- Website: http://www.ose.gr/en/

History
- Opened: 22 April 1884; 142 years ago
- Electrified: No

Services
Preceding station	Hellenic Train	Following station
Stefanovikeio towards Larissa	G4 Larissa-Volos	Volos Terminus
Former service
Preceding station	Thessaly Railways	Following station
Agia Georgios towards Volos	Volos–Kalambaka	Velestinon town towards Kalambaka
Agia Georgios towards Volos	Volos–Larissa	Rizomylos towards Larissa
Location
- Location within Greece

Velestino railway station (Greek: Σιδηροδρομικός Σταθμός Βελεστίνου, romanized: Sidirodromikos Stathmos Velestino) is a railway station in Velestino in Thessaly, Greece. It is located outside the settlement. The station lies 17 kilometres (11 mi) west of Volos and 40 kilometres (25 mi) southeast of Larissa. The station is situated at a junction Volos–Kalambaka and Volos–Larissa lines. The station is close to the E06 Motorway.

== History ==
The station was opened on 22 April 1884 by the Thessaly Railways (now part of OSE). The line was designed by the Italian Evaristo de Chirico, (father of Giorgio de Chirico) soon after the liberation of Central Greece from the Ottomans. The station stood at a junction Volos–Kalambaka and Volos–Larissa lines (The current line to Larissa followed a different alignment). The station also housed a large maintenance depot to the north, which now lies underused and overgrown. In 1960 the line from Larissa to Volos was converted to standard gauge and connected at Larissa with the mainline from Athens to Thessaloniki, allowing OSE to run through services to Volos from Athens and Thessaloniki. In 1955 Thessaly Railways was absorbed into Hellenic State Railways (SEK). In 1960 the line from Larissa to Volos was converted to standard gauge and connected through Larissa to the mainline from Athens to Thessaloniki, allowing OSE to run through services to Volos from Athens and Thessaloniki. Volos station was converted to dual gauge in order to accommodate trains of the two branches. Parts of the station and the track towards the city centre were at this period of a unique triple-gauge system: standard gauge for Larissa trains, metre gauge for Kalambaka trains and 600 mm gauge for Pellon trains. In 1970 OSE became the legal successor to the SEK, taking over responsibilities for most of Greece's rail infrastructure.

In 2001 the infrastructure element of OSE was created, known as GAIAOSE; it would henceforth be responsible for the maintenance of stations, bridges and other elements of the network, as well as the leasing and the sale of railway assists. In 2005, TrainOSE was created as a brand within OSE to concentrate on rail services and passenger interface. In July 2022, the station began being served by Hellenic Train, the rebranded TranOSE The move was welcomed by the mayor of Serres, Alexandros Chrysafis.

In 2009, with the Greek debt crisis unfolding OSE's Management was forced to reduce services across the network. Timetables were cut back, and routes closed as the government-run entity attempted to reduce overheads. In 2017 OSE's passenger transport sector was privatised as TrainOSE, currently a wholly owned subsidiary of Ferrovie dello Stato Italiane. Infrastructure, including stations, remained under the control of OSE.

On the 5 September 2023, Storm Daniel triggered largescale flooding in Thessaly. The rail infrastructure was badly affected in the region, cutting on both Regional and Intercity routes as significant parts of the infrastructure were washed away. OSE engineers were on the ground in the worst affected areas Domokos, Doxaras, and Paleofarsalos to assess the extent of the damage, and prepare detailed reports, and seek financial assistance from the European Union. 50 km (31 mi) of tracks was completely destroyed

Repairing the extensive damage, was estimated at between 35 and 45 million euros. OSE managing director, Panagiotis Terezakis, spoke of reconstruction works reaching 50 million euros, confirming at the same time that there will be no rail traffic in the effected sections of the network for at least a month. The devastation goes beyond the tracks and signalling, affecting costly equipment such as the European Train Control System (ETCS), which enhances rail safety.

The line from Volos to Larissa was damaged, with extensive work needed to repair the line and resume services. Services between Larissa and Volos remain suspended across Thessaly’s coast until the track is repaired, with a rail-replacement bus in operation.

== Facilities ==
The old station still stands but is not in regular use; as of (2021) the station is unstaffed, with no staffed booking office and just simple bus-like waiting rooms. the original track alignment has been moved, so access to the platforms is via crossing the lines. The platforms have no outside seating, Dot-matrix display departure and arrival screens or timetable poster boards for passenger information. The station remains little more than an unstaffed halt. However, the station has parking facilities.

== Services ==
As of September 2026, the regional train that usually runs between Larissa and Volos is suspended due to flood mitigation works: a rail replacement bus service runs parallel to the route, and calls at this station.

The station was also the starting point of the Velestino-Kalampaka line until its closure in 1999.
