= Melissiatika railway station =

Railway station in Volos, Thessaly, Greece

Μελισσιατίκων Melissiatika

General information
- Location: Nea Ionia 385 00, Volos, Greece; Magnesia; Greece
- Coordinates: 39°23′12″N 22°54′44″E
- Owner: GAIAOSE
- Line: Larissa-Volos railway
- Platforms: 1
- Tracks: 1
- Train operators: Hellenic Train

Construction
- Structure type: at-grade
- Parking: No
- Cycle facilities: No

Other information
- Website: http://www.ose.gr/en/

History
- Opened: 1960
- Closed: suspended as of 2020
- Electrified: Not currently (by 2025)
Location
- Location within Greece

Melissiatika railway station (Greek: Σιδηροδρομικός Σταθμός Μελισσιατίκων, romanized: Sidirodromikos Stathmos Melissiatika) is a suburban railway station in Volos in Thessaly, Greece. The station opened in 1960, thus is the only station on the Larissa-Volos railway built after the opening of the line and the Thessaly Railways was absorbed by the Hellenic State Railways. It is served by local trains between Larissa and Volos.

== History ==
The station opened in 1960 on the Larissa-Volos railway by the Thessaly Railways. In 1970 OSE became the legal successor to the SEK, taking over responsibilities for most of Greece's rail infrastructure.

In 2001 the infrastructure element of OSE was created, known as GAIAOSE, it would henceforth be responsible for the maintenance of stations, bridges and other elements of the network, as well as the leasing and the sale of railway assists. In 2005, TrainOSE was created as a brand within OSE to concentrate on rail services and passenger interface.

In 2009, with the Greek debt crisis unfolding OSE's Management was forced to reduce services across the network. Timetables were cut back and routes closed as the government-run entity attempted to reduce overheads. In 2017 OSE's passenger transport sector was privatised as TrainOSE, currently a wholly owned subsidiary of Ferrovie dello Stato Italiane. Infrastructure, including stations, remained under the control of OSE.

== Facilities ==
The station is little more than a halt, with a single platform and brick shelter with a ticket office (closed). There are no facilities at the station, apart from 2 benches and a (doorless) shelter.

== Services ==
The station was served by direct lines to the rest of Greece via Larissa and directly linked with Athens once per day, with Thessaloniki twice per day, and with Larissa 15 times a day. As of 2020, passenger service has been suspended.
