= Larissa–Volos railway =

Standard-gauge railway in Thessaly, Greece

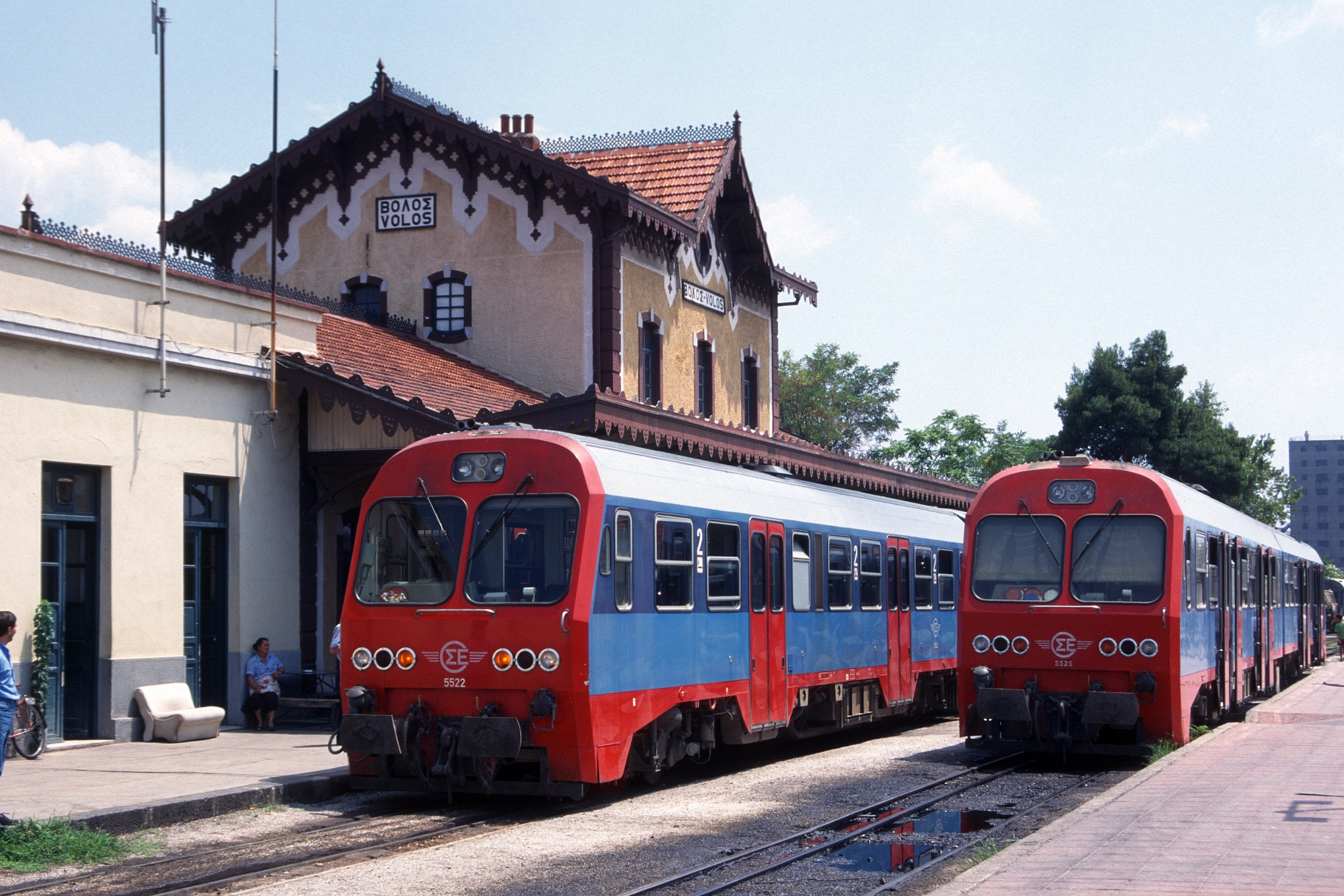
- Volos station 1995

Overview
- Status: Operational
- Owner: Thessaly Railways (1884-1955), Hellenic Railways Organisation (Lines), GAIAOSE (Station and trains)
- Locale: Greece (Thessaly)
- Termini: Larissa 39.3746°N 22.2522°E; Volos 39.6295°N 22.4228°E
- Stations: 7 (1 out of use)

Service
- Type: Regional railway
- Services: Regional
- Operator(s): Hellenic Train

History
- Opened: 1884 (metre gauge); 1960 (standard gauge)

Technical
- Line length: 60.76 km (37.75 mi)
- Number of tracks: Single track
- Character: Secondary
- Track gauge: 1,435 mm (4 ft 8 1/2 in) standard gauge
- Electrification: No
- Operating speed: 100 km/h (62 mph) (highest)

The railway from Larissa to Volos (Greek: Σιδηροδρομική γραμμή Λαρίσης - Βόλου, romanized: Sidirodromikí grammí Lárisas - Vólou) is a standard-gauge railway that connects Larissa with the coastal port city of Volos in Thessaly, Greece. It is Thessaly's most important regional line after the Palaiofarsalos–Kalambaka railway. As a branch line of the Piraeus–Platy railway, its western terminus at Larissa provides connections to Athens and Thessaloniki.

== Course ==
The line branches off at Larissa and continues to the southeast through Kypseli, Armenio and Stefanovikeio before heading south to Velestino, where it meets the former metre-gauge line to Kalambaka. It then advances eastwards from Melissiatika to its eastern terminus at Volos.

== Stations ==
The stations on the Larissa–Volos railway service are:

- Larissa railway station (connecting to Athens, Thessaloniki and suburban Thessaloniki)
- Kypseli railway station
- Armenio railway station
- Stefanovikeio railway station
- Velestino railway station
- Melissiatika railway station (services suspended)
- Volos railway station

== History ==
Construction of the metre-gauge railway began in 1882, and the line was inaugurated on 22 April 1884 as part of the private-owned company Thessaly Railways. The project was designed and led by Italian-born Evaristo de Chirico, father of the famous painter Giorgio de Chirico, and Greek banker Theodoros Mavrogordatos. The original route was somewhat different from the current one, passing through the Volos quarry and proceeding to the centre of the city, where it met the narrow-gauge Pelion railway. In 1960, the decision was made to convert the line to standard gauge, thus speeding up travel times by allowing through traffic to bypass Larissa via the Piraeus–Platy railway. The line from Volos to Larissa was damaged during Storm Daniel, with extensive work needed to repair the line and resume services.

== Services ==
The Larissa–Volos railway is used by the following passenger services:

- Hellenic Train regional service between Larissa and Volos. The journey time is 48 minutes.

== Future ==
The line is currently being upgraded with the installation of railway signalling, electrification and ETCS systems. At an estimated cost of €71.24 million, it is one of a number of "new-generation projects" aimed at improving rail connectivity across Greece.

=== Modernisation and reconstruction works ===
The Larissa–Volos railway has undergone significant reconstruction and upgrade works since the early 2020s. In May 2022, ERGOSE signed a contract for the installation of electrification, signalling, telecommand systems, and ETCS Level 1 on the 61.5 km line. The project also includes the construction of a new approximately 10 km railway deviation between Latomeio and Volos, the renovation of station buildings, and the creation of a new passenger stop serving the Volos Industrial Area. The modernisation programme aims to improve safety, interoperability, capacity, and passenger comfort while connecting the line to Greece's electrified main railway network.

In September 2023, the line suffered extensive damage from Storm Daniel, resulting in the suspension of rail services and the need for large-scale reconstruction works across Thessaly. Subsequent restoration projects focused on repairing track infrastructure, signalling systems, embankments, and other railway assets damaged by flooding. Reconstruction activities accelerated during 2025 and 2026 as part of a broader programme to restore and enhance the resilience of Thessaly's transport infrastructure.

In 2026, the Greek government included the Larissa–Volos upgrade project in the National Development Programme 2026–2030, providing additional funding for electrification, signalling installation, and route improvements. The project is intended to support the eventual resumption of rail services and the long-term modernisation of the railway corridor between Larissa and Volos.
