= Larissa railway station =

Railway station in Greece

Λάρισα Larissa
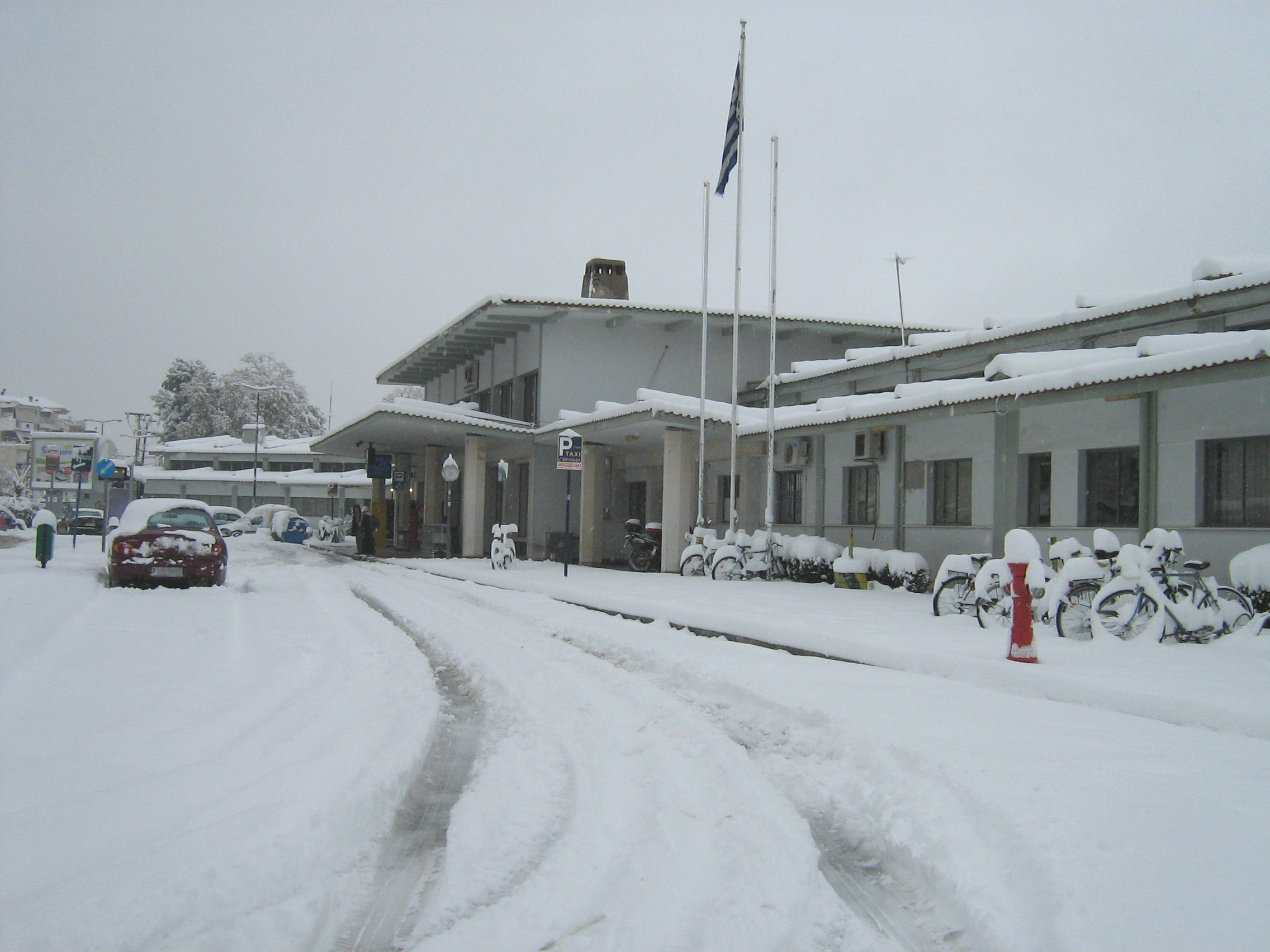
- Larissa railway station forecourt, December 2010

General information
- Location: 37 Palaiologou, PC 412 23; Larissa; Greece
- Coordinates: 39°37′46″N 22°25′22″E
- Elevation: 83.00 metres (272.31 ft)
- Owner: GAIAOSE
- Operator: Hellenic Train
- Lines: Larissa–Volos railway; Piraeus–Platy railway
- Platforms: 4
- Tracks: 6
- Bus routes: 3, 11, 14, 573/4, 575/6, 577/0
- Connections: Bus Bus

Construction
- Structure type: At-grade
- Platform levels: 1
- Parking: Yes
- Cycle facilities: Yes
- Architectural style: Modern

Other information
- Status: Staffed
- Website: https://www.hellenictrain.gr/

Key dates
- 22 April 1884: Railway station opened
- 8 March 1957: Railway station closed
- 26 August 1962: Railway station rebuilt
- 7 September 2008: Regional Railway opened

Services
| Preceding station | Hellenic Train | Following station |
|---|---|---|
| Palaiofarsalos towards Athens | C1 Athens-Thessaloniki | Katerini towards Thessaloniki |
| Terminus | G4 Larissa-Volos | Kypseli towards Volos |
| Preceding station | Regional Rail | Following station |
| Terminus | Line T1 | Rapsani towards Thessaloniki |
Former service
| Preceding station | Thessaly Railways | Following station |
|---|---|---|
| Terminus | Larissa–Volos | Chalki towards Volos |
Location

Larissa railway station (Greek: Σιδηροδρομικός σταθμός Λάρισας, romanized: Sidirodromikós stathmós Larísas) is the main station for Larissa in Thessaly, Greece. Located in a residential area, close to the city centre, it is served by InterCity trains between Athens and Thessaloniki, Express services to Kalambaka, Regional services to Volos and (since 2008) the southern terminus for Line 1 of Proastiakos or Thessaloniki Regional Railway services to Thessaloniki. Larissa railway station should not be confused with Larissa Station in Athens (now known as Athens railway station).

== History ==
=== Thessaly Railways ===
The first station to open in Larissa was built by Thessaly Railways, and opened on 22 April 1884 as the northern terminus of the Thessaly Railways line to Volos, on 1,000 mm (3 ft 3 3/8 in) metre gauge. The original station building (and the line) was designed by the Italian Evaristo de Chirico, (father of Giorgio de Chirico). The stations all followed a simmer design, built of hewn, jointed stone, which gave the appearance of a mosaic, all the other stations along this network, small and large, had this form. Larissa station (known locally as Larisaikos) was originally built in the colonial style, with a strong romantic stamp, the building was almost identical to that of Volos, both of which stood out for their aesthetic apprentice. Larissa was larger, built to a two floor height, on the ground floor there were five doors with low arches at their top. The upper floor of the main building was covered with plaster and had five windows, symmetrically placed with the doors on the ground floor, while the side walls had the name of the station written on them. The side of the building that faced the station square was decorated on the roof of the floor with a large clock, covered by an arched arch.

The line was authorised by the Greek government under the law AMH’/22.6.1882. soon after the liberation of Central Greece from the Ottomans. In March 1889, the government of Charilaos Trikoupis ordered the construction of The "Piraeus-Demerli-Border Railway" and a second station was built to 1,435 mm (4 ft 8 1/2 in) standard gauge. In 1908 the train arrived in Larissa and the (then) border of Greece. The first passenger train between Athens and Thessaloniki was launched in March 1918, and the first international train, a branch of the "Simplon Orient Express", arrived in Athens in June 1920.

=== Nationalisation ===
In 1955 Thessaly Railways, faced with huge financial obligations, was absorbed into Hellenic State Railways (SEK). On 8 March 1957, Thessaly was hit by a 6.4 doublet earthquake while reported casualties were light, much of Evaristo de Chirico station buildings, suffered severer damage. Despite repairs, the station visible could not cope with the increasing traffic due to the population and commercial development of the city. In 1958 it was decided to demolish it and replace new, modern and comfortable station. It was thus decided to take the opportunity and combine both stations (on the site of the former Thessaly Railways station), with the former Piraeus-Larissa-Papapouli station closing. The major reconstruction meant most of the old Thessaly Railways station still standing was demolished with the construction of the existing one began in 1960.

In 1960 the line from Larissa to Volos was converted to standard gauge and connected through Larissa to the mainline from Athens to Thessaloniki, allowing through services to Volos from Athens and Thessaloniki.

The new railway station was inaugurated on 26 August 1962 at a cost of cost 6,500,000 drachmas (€19.075.58 as of 2022). It was reported Panagiotis Kanellopoulos, then Deputy Prime Minister made the official inauguration. The inauguration ceremony was also attended by the Deputy Speaker of Parliament Konstantinos Rodopoulos, the Minister of Industry Nikolaos Martis, the Minister of Infrastructure and Transport Solos Gikas, the Deputy Minister of Transport Theodoros Konitsas, Metropolis of Larissa and Tyrnavos Ilios Platamos. The new station was complete with a new booking hall, buffet bar, sidings and longer platforms. In 1970 OSE became the legal successor to the SEK, taking over responsibilities for most of Greece's rail infrastructure.

=== GAIAOSE ===
In 2001 the infrastructure element of OSE was created, known as GAIAOSE; it would henceforth be responsible for the maintenance of stations, bridges and other elements of the network, as well as the leasing and the sale of railway assists. In 2003, OSE launched "Proastiakos SA", as a subsidiary to serve the operation of the suburban network in the urban complex of Athens during the 2004 Olympic Games. In 2005, TrainOSE was created as a brand within OSE to concentrate on rail services and passenger interface.

In 2005 part of the station building was given over to a museum. Housed in auxiliary buildings of the main station building, it houses railway Paraphernalia from Thessaly Railways and the 1930s and is run by the Association of Friends of the Larissa Railway (S.F.S.L.). In 2008, all Proastiakos were transferred from OSE to TrainOSE.

In 2009, with the Greek debt crisis unfolding OSE's Management was forced to reduce services across the network. Timetables were cut back, and routes closed as the government-run entity attempted to reduce overheads. In 2011 it was reported that the Greek government was looking at divestiture of certain high-profile assets of OSE, namely a number of the larger terminal stations, most notably Athens, Piraeus, Thessaloniki, Volos and also Larissa. In January 2017, heavy snowfall forced many trains services to be suspended. In 2017 OSE's passenger transport sector was privatised as TrainOSE, (Now Hellenic Train) a wholly owned subsidiary of Ferrovie dello Stato Italiane. Infrastructure, including stations, remained under the control of OSE. In 2018 a new coffee shop opened within the station. In 2019 the station received negative publicity after it was reported the high levels of rubbish left in and around the station. The issue stemmed for one of finally responsibility for cleaning and maintaining the station forecourt. In October 2019, the station played host to a Training Seminar The train goes… school… and protects the environment, health and culture. The event was organised via the Directorates of Primary Education of Larissa and Magnesia (through the Responsible School Activities and in collaboration with the Regional Center for Educational Planning (PEKES) of PDE Thessaly, Coordination of Sustainability of Thessaly and OSE). The event was held on 16 October 2019 from 17.00 to 20.00 within the station building.

In February 2021, severe weather closed the network around Larissa, with stations inaccessible, and overhead power lines down, leading to delays of over 12 hours. In May 2022, INTRAKAT was given the go-ahead for the €82.890.000 electrification and signalling upgrades of the Larissa–Volos line, due for completion in 2025. In July 2022, the station began being served by Hellenic Train, the rebranded TranOSE On 18 September, services were again suspended due to the loss of electricity in the wider Larissa aria, with services resuming the following day.

On the 5 September 2023, Storm Daniel triggered largescale flooding in Thessaly. The rail infrastructure was badly affected in the region, cutting off both Regional and Intercity routes as significant parts of the infrastructure were washed away. OSE engineers were on the ground in the worst affected areas Domokos, Doxaras, and Paleofarsalos to assess the extent of the damage, and prepare detailed reports, and seek financial assistance from the European Union. 50 km (31 mi) of tracks was completely destroyed Repairing the extensive damage, was estimated at between 35 and 45 million euros. OSE managing director, Panagiotis Terezakis, spoke of reconstruction works reaching 50 million euros, confirming at the same time that there will be no rail traffic in the effected sections of the network for at least a month. The devastation goes beyond the tracks and signalling, affecting costly equipment such as the European Train Control System (ETCS), which enhances rail safety. In November 2023, rail services resumed between Larissa and Rapsani after the devastating storm With Through services from Athens to Thessaloniki recommencing on 16 December 2023. However services between Larissa and Volos remain suspended across Thessaly’s coast until the track is repaired, with a rail-replacement bus in operation.

== Facilities ==
The station has waiting rooms and a staffed ticket office within a 1960s-era building. The station has a buffet and a new coffee shop. The station has toilets, with plans for upgrades and improved cleaning routes. Luggage lockers are available (24 hours). The station is equipped with Dot-matrix display departure and arrival screens on the platforms for passenger information. There are bus pick-up/drop-off stops, taxi ranks and parking in the forecourt.

In June 2020 during the COVID-19 pandemic, the station was one of the first in Greece to utilise thermal cameras in order to measure the temperature of staff and passengers, as an additional precautionary measure against the coronavirus.

== Services ==
=== Train services ===
As of September 2026, the following weekday train services call at this station:

- Hellenic Train Intercity between Athens and Thessaloniki, with up to two trains per day in each direction;
- Thessaloniki Regional Railway Line T1 towards Thessaloniki, with up to eight trains per day in each direction;

Intercity services are currently limited, due to grade separation works near Sepolia in Athens, and flood mitigation works in Thessaly: the regional train that usually runs towards Volos is suspended, also due to flood mitigation works: a rail replacement bus service runs parallel to the route, serving some of the stations on the route.

=== Local public transport ===
The station is also served by local and regional buses:

KTEL operates Lines 3, 11 & 14 while OSE operates Lines 573/4, 575/6 & 577/0. (All services are accessible from the forecourt).

== Accidents and incidents ==
=== 2008 accident ===
On 8 March 2008, an Alexandroupolis-bound InterCity train derailed 2 kilometres (1.2 mi) outside the station, with Reuters reporting no deaths and a total of 28 people injured in the incident. The Jerusalem Post reporting 20 adults and 3 children were taken to a nearby hospital Initial reports indicated human error, when the station master (who) failed to change the points after a previous train had passed through the station, causing five carriages from the passenger train to jump the tracks. The two drivers of the derailed train were taken in for questioning, the station master fled the scene and is now being sought by authorities.

=== 2018 accident ===
On 3 August 2018, a Stylida-bound train derailed at the station. No deaths and only two injuries resulted. The train left the tracks and collided with a wall of a building as it entered the station. Initial reports indicate an unknown person in the control room had switched the points, sending the train straight into the building. This again raised the issue of rail safety in Greece.

=== 2019 accident ===
On 26 April 2019, two carriages on an Intercity service between Thessaloniki and Athens derailed outside Larissa; no injuries were reported among the passengers.

=== Tempi train crash ===
On 28 February 2023, a passenger train and a freight train collided 27.3 kilometres (17.0 mi) north of the station, resulting in the deaths of at least 57 people and injuring dozens, making it the single deadliest railway accident on record in Greece. (as of 1 March) 50 to 60 people are currently unaccounted for following the crash.

The Larissa station master claims the switch from the up line (northbound) to the down line (southbound) was not working and that the train was meant to stay on the up line to avoid the freight train. He also claims he let the train through a red signal. There is a single block section starting from the exit signal at Larissa until the entry signal at Neoi Poroi. This is due to delays on ETCS implementation, meant to finish in 2020, that will ultimately be implemented in late 2023.

According to reports, Police arrested a stationmaster and charged him with causing death and harm through negligence.

== Line layout ==
| L Ground/Concourse | Customer service | Shops/Buffet | Tickets/Exits |
| Level; Ε1 | Side platform, doors will open on the right |
| Level; Ε1 | Platform 1 | ← towards Athens (Palaiofarsalos) |
| Level; Ε1 | Platform 2Α | towards Thessaloniki (Katerini) → |
| Level; Ε1 | Platform 2Β | towards Thessaloniki (Rapsani) → |
| Level; Ε1 | Island platform, doors open on the right/left |
| Level; Ε1 | Platform 3Α | towards Volos (Kypseli) → |
| Level; Ε1 | Platform 3Β | towards Thessaloniki (Rapsani) → |
| Level; Ε1 | Platform 4 | ← Terminus |
| Level; Ε1 | Island platform, doors to the left |
| Level; Ε1 | Platform 5 | In non-regular use |
| Level; Ε1 | Island platform, doors on the right/left |
| Level; Ε1 | Platform 6 | In non-regular use |

== Gallery ==
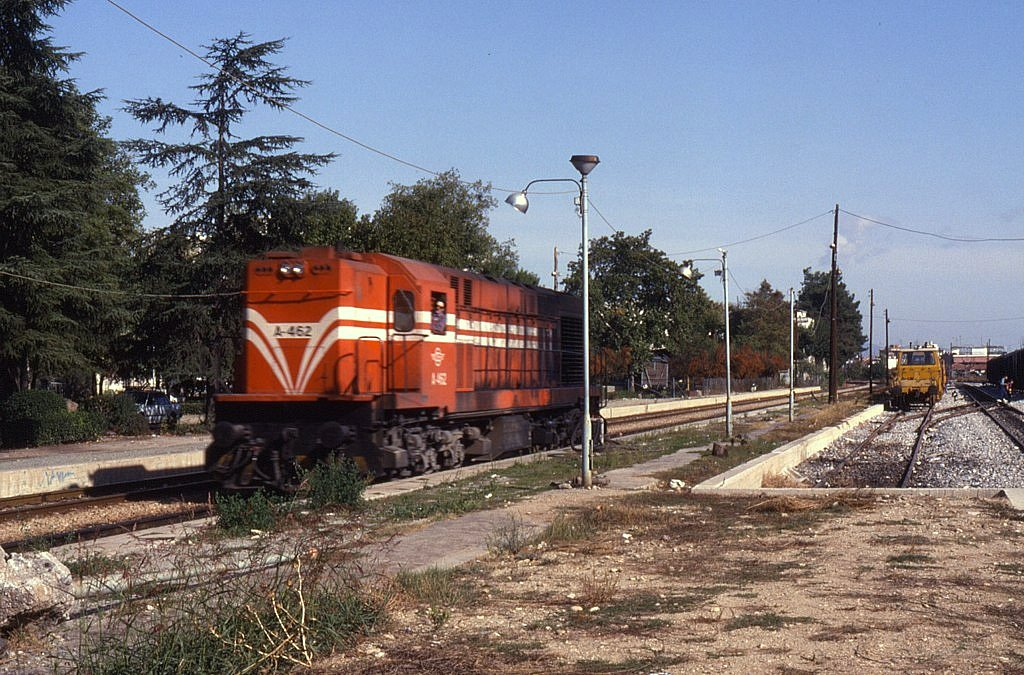
Unit A462, an OSE diesel locomotive, stands at Larissa station between duties, 6 November 1992

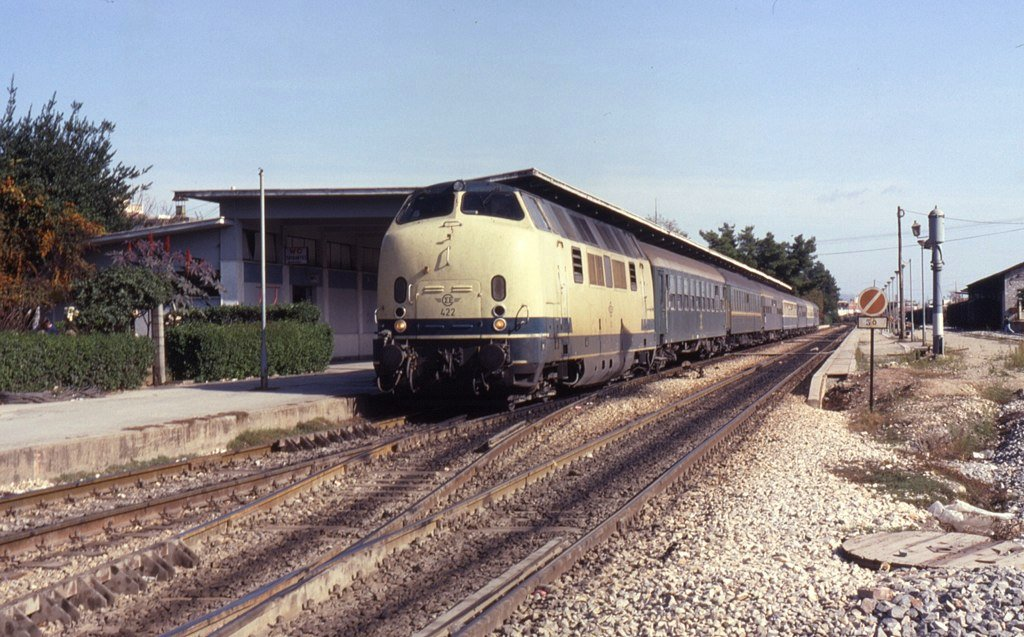
Unit A422 (still sporting the familiar DB blue and white livery), a Krauss-Maffei built diesel-electric locomotive from the 1960s seen at Larissa, 6 November 1992

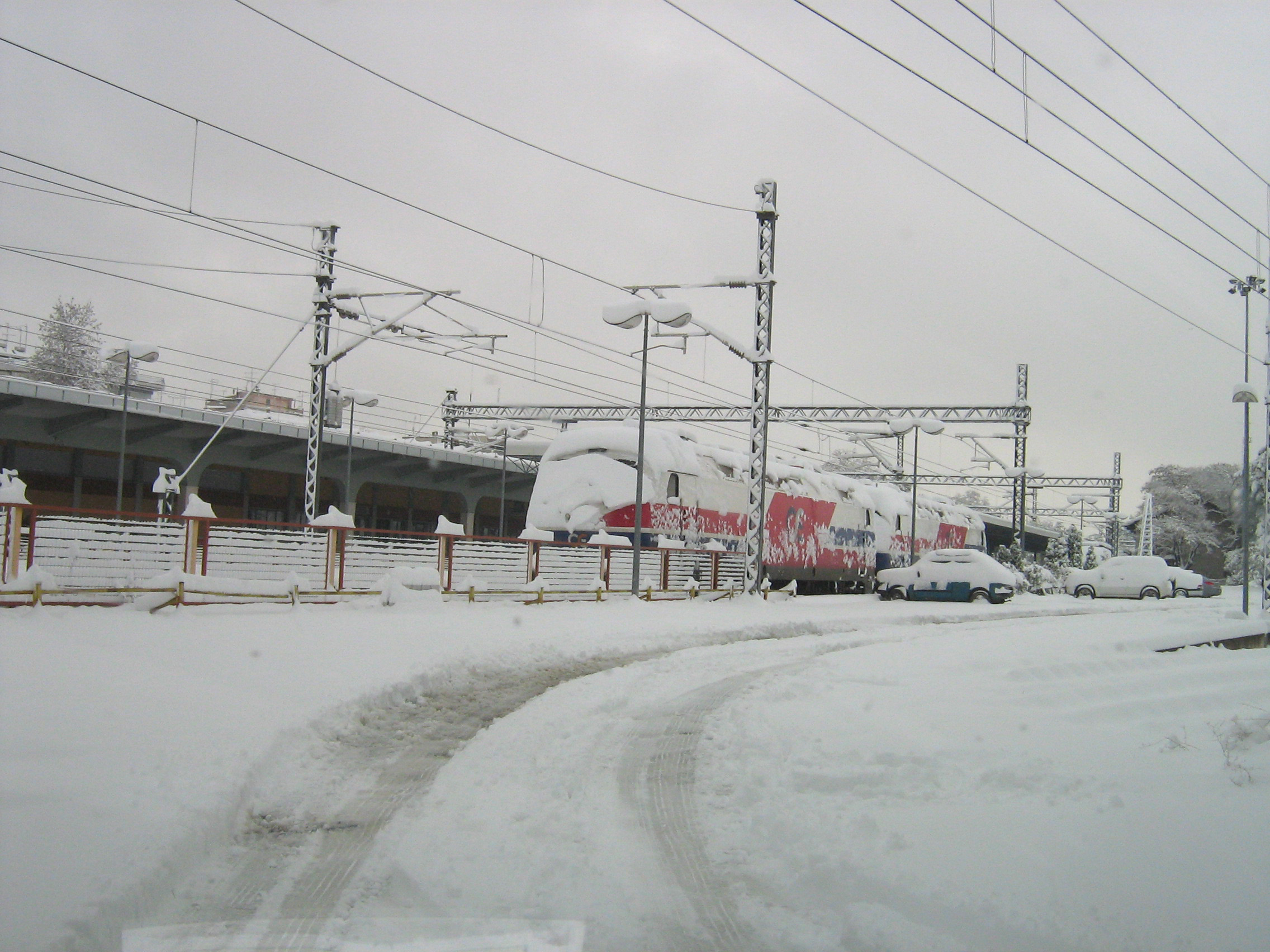
Photo of the snow-covered platforms of Larissa station, 16 December 2010

== See also ==
- Railway stations in Greece
- Hellenic Railways Organization
- Hellenic Train
- Proastiakos
- P.A.Th.E./P.
