= Rapsani =

Rapsani Ραψάνη
- Community
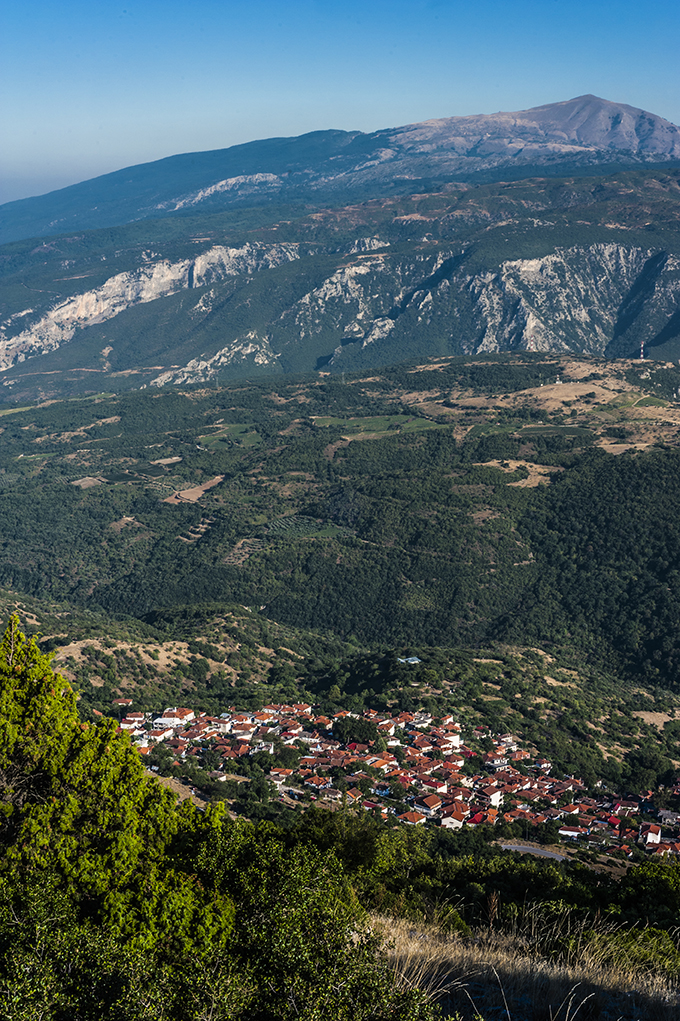

- Location within Greece
- Coordinates: 39°54′N 22°33′E
- Country: Greece
- Administrative region: Thessaly
- Regional unit: Larissa
- Municipality: Tempi
- Municipal unit: Kato Olympos

Population (2021)
  - Community: 505
- Time zone: UTC+2 (EET)
  - Summer (DST): UTC+3 (EEST)

Rapsani (Greek: Ραψάνη) is a town of the former municipal district of Kato Olympos, which is part of the municipality of Tempi in the Larissa regional unit, Thessaly, Greece.

Rapsani is sited at an altitude of 600 meters. The location of Peneus river at the level of the station Rapsani is a scenic landscape. The town is close (5 km) from a station that bears the same name.

== History ==
The settlement is recorded as village and as "Rapşani" in the Ottoman Tahrir Defter number 101 dating to 1521.
