= Volos railway station =

Railway station in Greece

Βόλος Volos
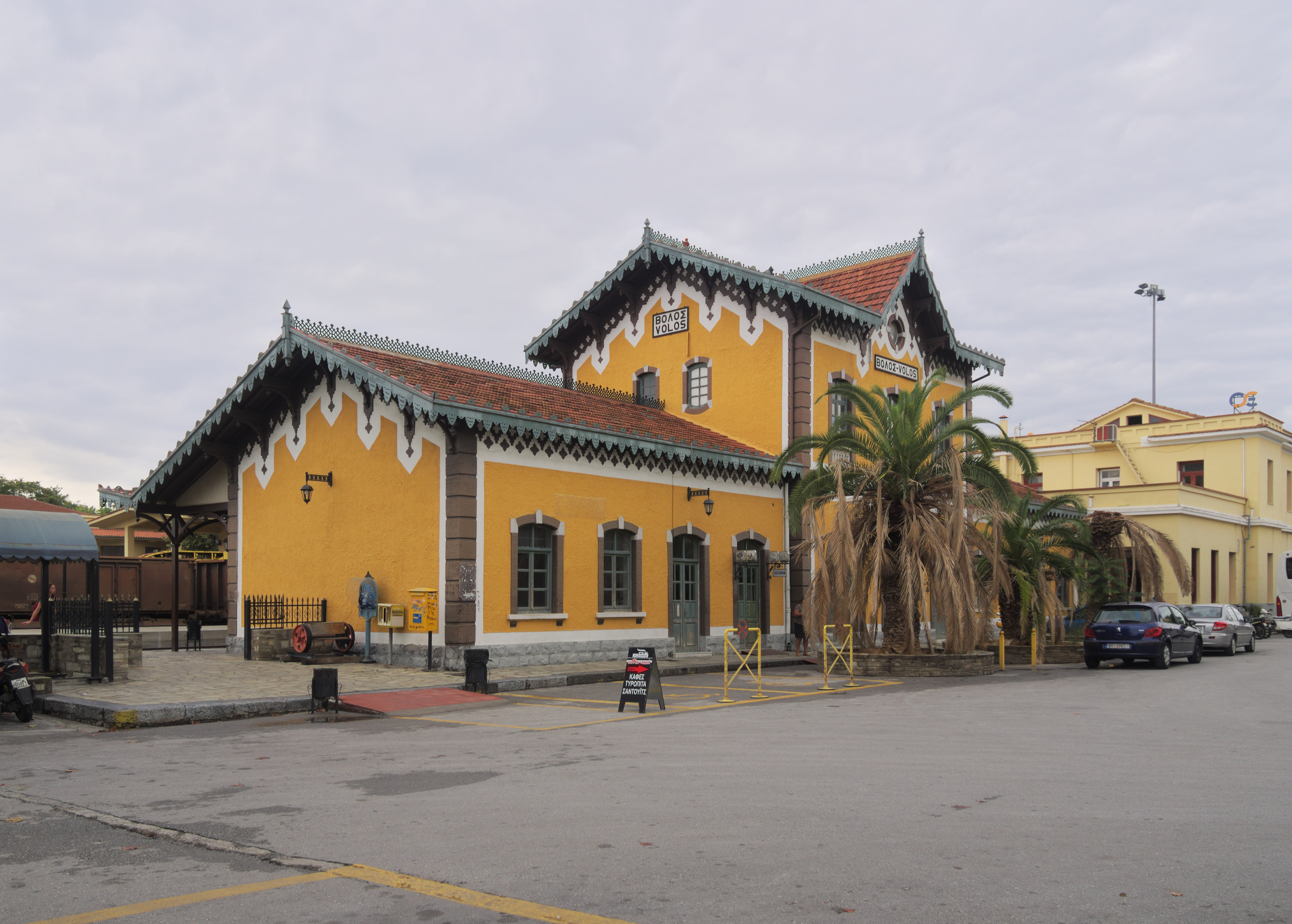
- Volos railway station in 2017

General information
- Location: Volos 383 34; Magnesia; Greece
- Coordinates: 39.3651°N 22.9366°E
- Elevation: 83.00 metres (272.31 ft)
- Owner: GAIAOSE
- Operator: Hellenic Train
- Line: Larissa–Volos railway
- Distance: 59.0 kilometres (36.7 mi) from Larissa
- Platforms: 2 (1 side platform, 1 island platform
- Tracks: 2
- Bus routes: Larissa
- Connections: Bus Bus

Construction
- Structure type: at Grade
- Platform levels: 1
- Parking: Yes
- Cycle facilities: No
- Architect: Evaristo de Chirico

Other information
- Status: Unstaffed (November 2021)
- Website: http://www.ose.gr/en/

History
- Opened: 22 April 1884; 142 years ago
- Closed: 12 November 2021; 4 years ago (Ticket office)
- Rebuilt: 1960; 66 years ago (converted to standard gauge)
- Electrified: No
- Original company: Thessaly Railways

Services
Preceding station	Hellenic Train	Following station
Velestino towards Larissa	G4 Larissa-Volos	Terminus
Former service
Preceding station	Thessaly Railways	Following station
Latomeion towards Kalambaka	Kalambaka–Volos	Terminus
Latomeion towards Larissa	Larissa–Volos	Terminus
Terminus	Volos–Mileai	Koleti towards Mileai
Location
- Location within Greece

Volos railway station (Greek: Σιδηροδρομικός Σταθμός Βόλου, romanized: Sidirodromikos Stathmos Volos) is a railway station in Volos, Greece. located within the city itself (close to the harbour). Opened on 22 April 1884 by the Thessaly Railways (now part of OSE). Today Hellenic Train operates three daily local trains to Larissa. Previously Thessaly Railways operated a narrow gauge service to Milies from Volos, however this service now starts and terminates from Ano Lechonia (12 km from Volos).

== History ==
The station was opened on 22 April 1884, an inauguration led by King George. The station building (and the line) was designed by the Italian Evaristo de Chirico, (father of Giorgio de Chirico) soon after the liberation of Central Greece from the Ottomans. Part of the station still functions in this picturesque 1884 structure, reminiscent of a stately home to some. The building, built between 1882 and 1883 under Evaristo De Chirico, served as the administrative headquarters of the Thessaly Railways. The building remains much the same the day it was constructed and is one of the few buildings that survived the earthquakes that hit Volos in the 1950s. Its roof is birch and has a wooden outline. Outside the station there is a statue of the goddess Athena, the work of the Italian sculptor I. Previsan.

After Thessaly Railways completed the construction of the 1,000 mm (3 ft 3 3/8 in) metre gauge lines from Volos to Larissa and Kalampaka (1886) it was decided to extend the network eastwards, to connect Volos with the communities of Pelion Peninsula. Due to limited space and mountainous terrain the decision was taken to build this extension in 600 mm (1 ft 11 5/8 in) narrow gauge. The new line extended from Volos station through Volos city centre (as a tramway) to Agria (1892), reaching Ano Lechonia in 1896 and Mileai (Milies) in 1903.

In 1955 Thessaly Railways was absorbed into Hellenic State Railways (SEK). In 1960 the line from Larissa to Volos was converted to standard gauge and connected though Larissa to the mainline from Athens to Thessaloniki, allowing OSE to run through services to Volos from Athens and Thessaloniki. Volos station was converted to dual gauge, in order to accommodate trains of the two branches. Parts of the station and the track towards the city center were at this period of a unique triple-gauge system: standard gauge for Larissa trains, metre gauge for Kalambaka trains and 600 mm gauge for Pelion trains. In 1970 OSE became the legal successor to the SEK, taking over responsibilities for most of Greece's rail infrastructure.

In 2001 the infrastructure element of OSE was created, known as GAIAOSE, it would henceforth be responsible for the maintenance, of stations, bridges and other elements of the network, as well as the leasing and the sale of railway assists. In 2005, TrainOSE was created as a brand within OSE to concentrate on rail services and passenger interface.

In 2009, with the Greek debt crisis unfolding OSE's Management was forced to reduce services across the network. Timetables were cutback and routes closed, as the government-run entity attempted to reduce overheads. In 2017 OSE's passenger transport sector was privatised as TrainOSE, currently, a wholly owned subsidiary of Ferrovie dello Stato Italiane. Infrastructure, including stations, remained under the control of OSE.

The section from Volos to Agria line was operated as a heritage railway by "The Friends of Pelion Railway" between 1987 and 1994, but OSE forced them to terminate the operation in a row over competition. However, in 1996 OSE reopened the section from Ano Lechonia to Mileai as a heritage railway, initially using steam traction and converting to diesel traction in 1999. However, there is currently no connection between Volos and Ano Lekhonia.

On 12 November 2021, it was reported that the station was closing after 137 years as a staffed station, the decision has been greeted by local opposition and even debates in parliament. In May 2022, INTRAKAT was given the go-ahead for the €82.890.000 electrification and signalling upgrades of the Larissa–Volos line, due for completion in 2025. In July 2022, the station began being served by Hellenic Train, the rebranded TranOSE

On the 5 September 2023, Storm Daniel triggered largescale flooding in Thessaly. The rail infrastructure was badly affected in the region, cutting on both Regional and Intercity routes as significant parts of the infrastructure were washed away. OSE engineers were on the ground in the worst affected areas Domokos, Doxaras, and Paleofarsalos to assess the extent of the damage, and prepare detailed reports, and seek financial assistance from the European Union. 50 km (31 mi) of tracks was completely destroyed

Repairing the extensive damage, was estimated at between 35 and 45 million euros. OSE managing director, Panagiotis Terezakis, spoke of reconstruction works reaching 50 million euros, confirming at the same time that there will be no rail traffic in the effected sections of the network for at least a month. The devastation goes beyond the tracks and signalling, affecting costly equipment such as the European Train Control System (ETCS), which enhances rail safety.

The line from Volos to Larissa was damaged, with extensive work needed to repair the line and resume services, with the approaches at Volos being damage with fallen tries and ballast washed away. As a result services between Larissa and Volos remain suspended across Thessaly’s coast until the track is repaired, with a rail-replacement bus in operation.

Today the first floor of the station building is given over to a museum. which it has housed since 2003.

== Facilities ==
The ground-level station is accessed via stairs or a ramp. It has 1 Side platform and 1 Island platform, with the main station buildings located on the westbound platform. Both platforms are equipped with waiting shelters with access to platform 2 via a 'barrow crossing'. The Station is housed in the original stone-built station, which has a staffed booking office with a cafe in the station. There are toilets and parking onsite. Local and regional buses stop in the forecourt. At platform level, there are sheltered seating but currently no Dot-matrix display departure and arrival screens, however, timetable poster boards on both platforms are available. There is a passenger car park, with free parking. Outside the station is a bus stop where local and regional buses to Larissa call.

== Services ==
As of September 2026, the regional train that usually runs towards Larissa is suspended due to flood mitigation works: a rail replacement bus service runs parallel to the route, serving some of the stations on the route.

In the past Volos was served by railway lines of three different gauges, the metre gauge line of Thessaly Railways to Kalambaka, the standard gauge line to Larissa and the 600 mm (1 ft 11 5/8 in) gauge line to Pelion. Remnants of triple gauge lines still exist near the station. Currently, the Pelion railway operates for touristic heritage service every Saturday, Sunday and public holiday from mid-April to the end of October from Ano Lehonia. The train runs every day during July and August and can be reached using the Volos–Lehonia-Platanidia bus line, currently no services call at Volos.

== Station layout ==
L Ground/Concourse	Customer service	Tickets/Exits
Level; Ε1	Side platform, doors will open on the right
Level; Ε1	Platform 1	towards Larissa (Velestino) ←
Level; Ε1	Platform 2	towards Larissa (Velestino) ←
Level; Ε1	Island platform, doors on the right/left
Level; Ε1	Platform 3	In non-regular use

== Gallery ==
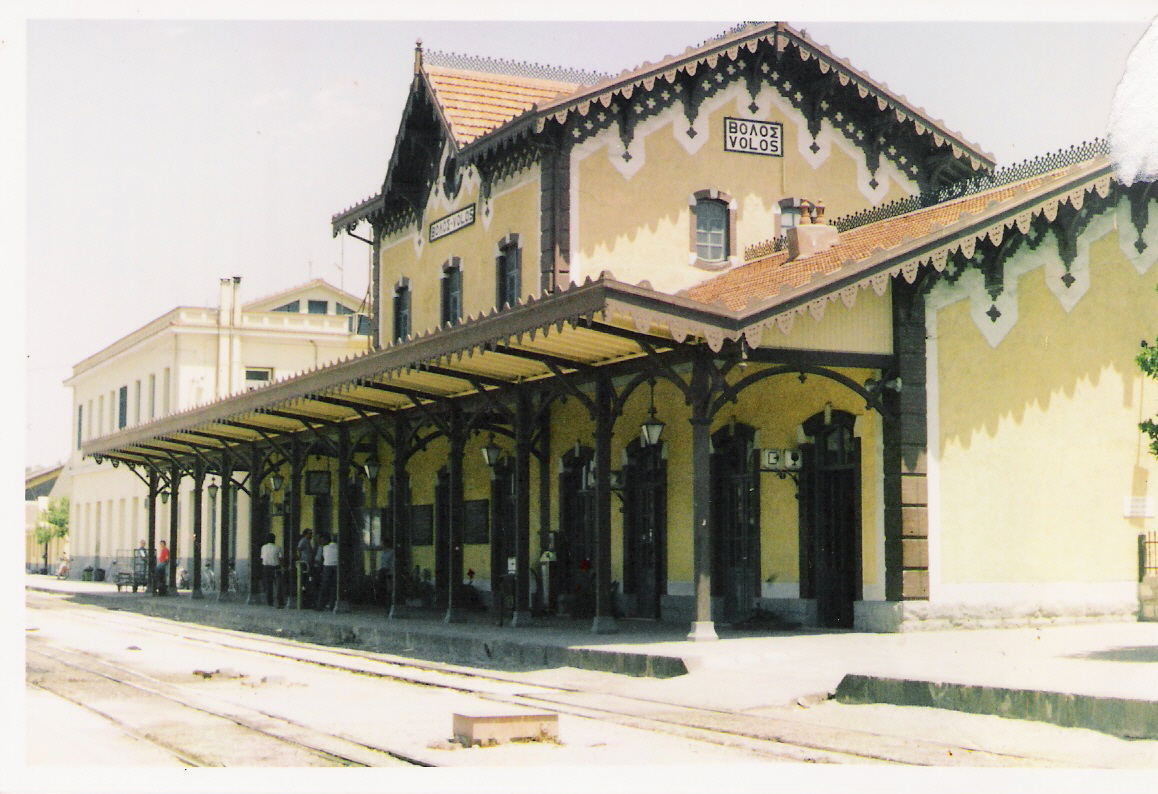
Volos station 1990

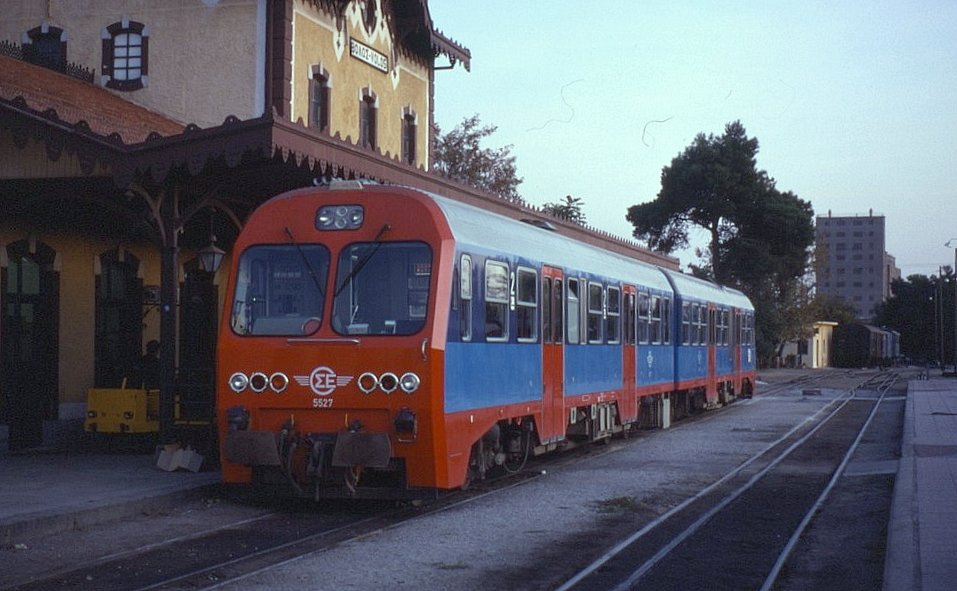
2-car DMU set 5527 on train 1850, 17:32 from Vólos to Kalabáka, 6 November 1992

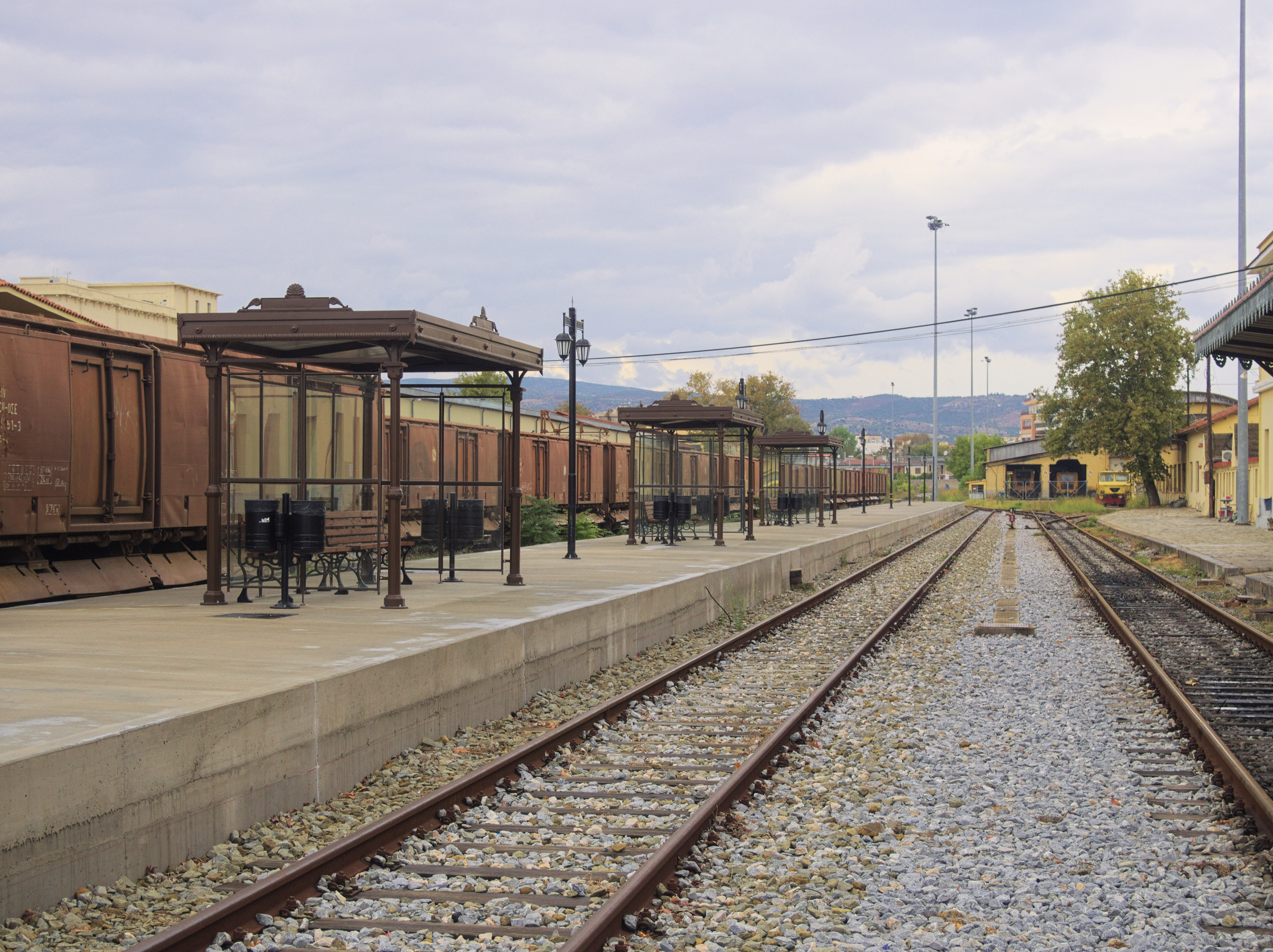
The platform of Volos train station, 30 September 2017

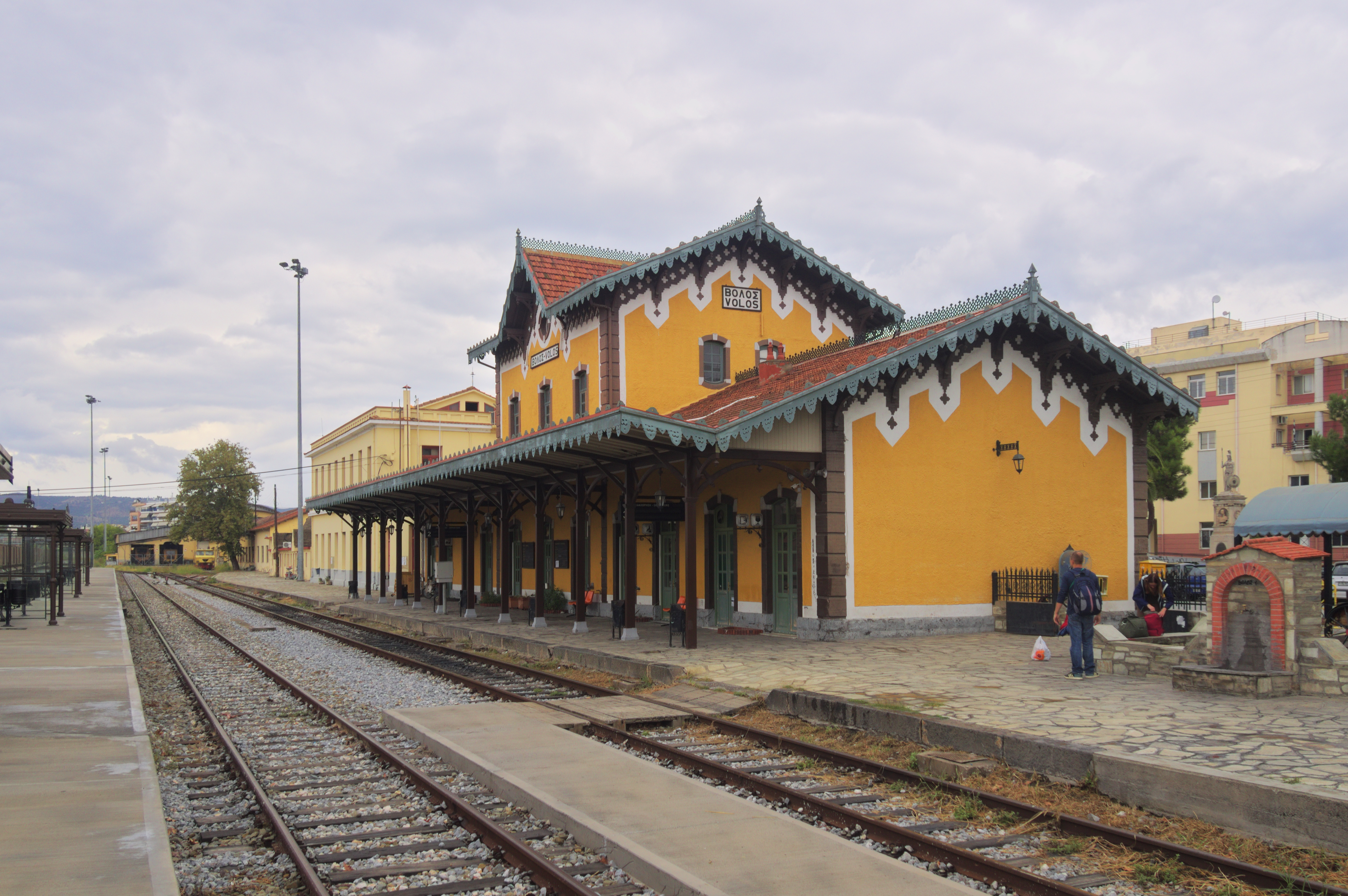
Volos train station, 30 September 2017

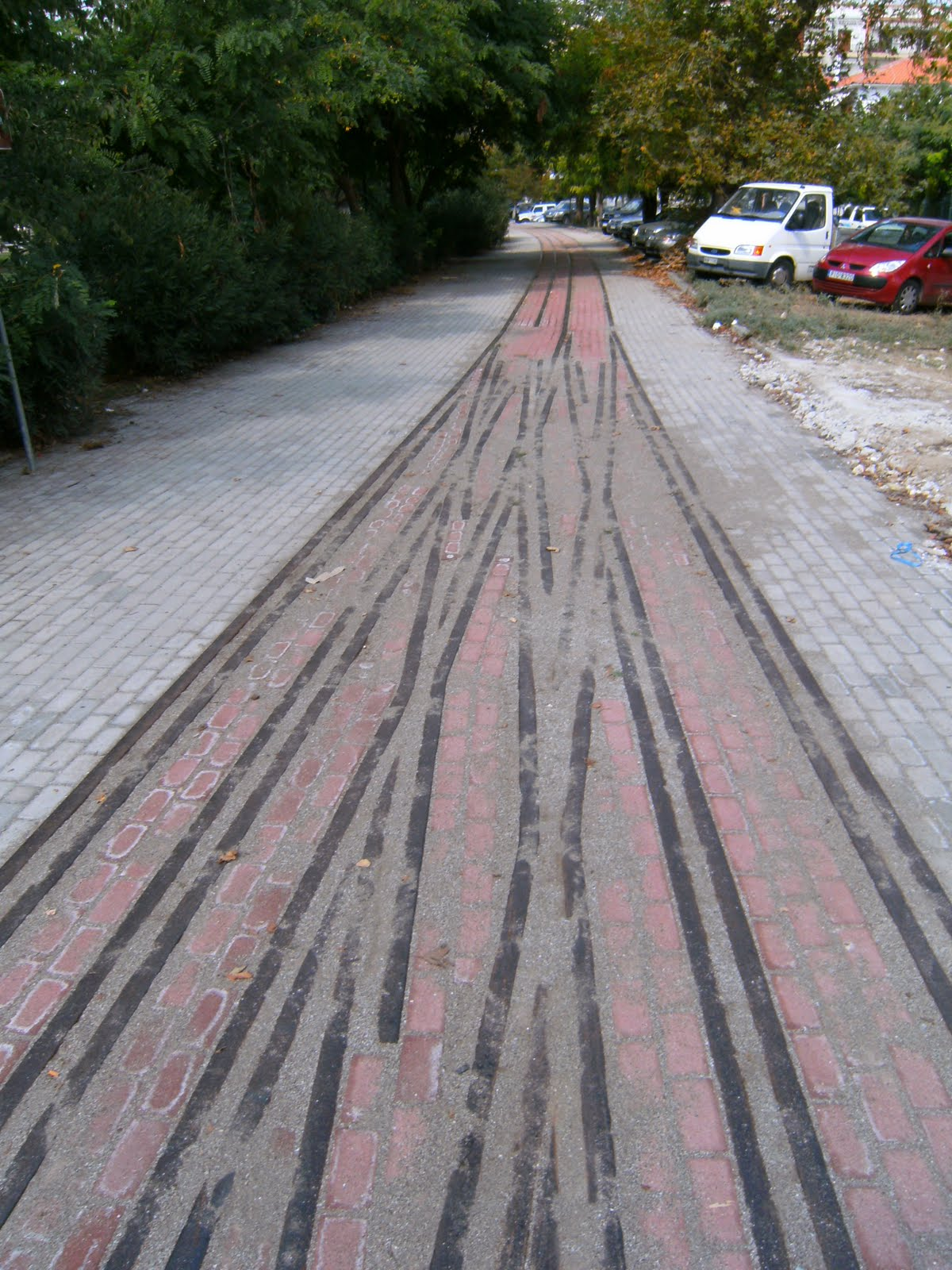
The Metric approaches leading off to Girtoni, 28 September 2009

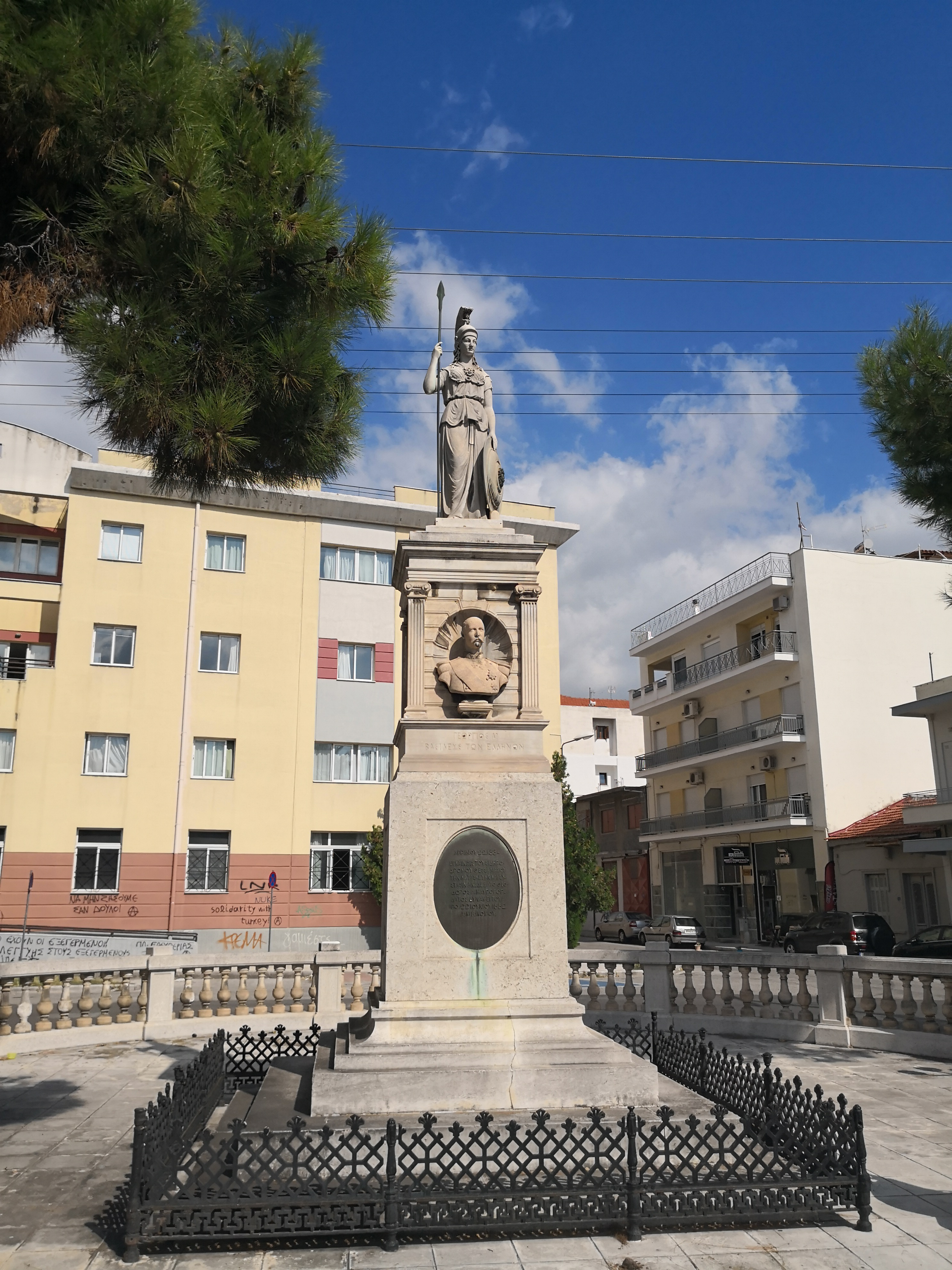
The 1884 statue of Athena at the station by G. Previsan, September 2018

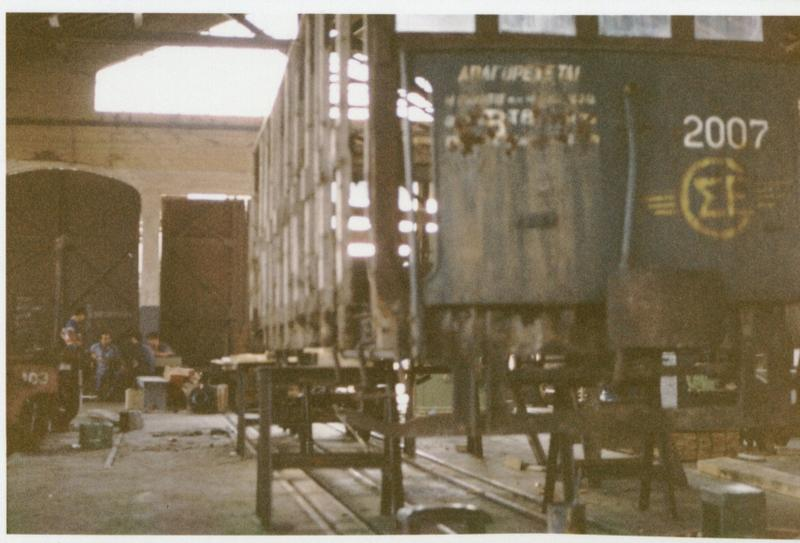
Narrow gauge rolling stock under restoration in Volos Engine Sheds in 1990

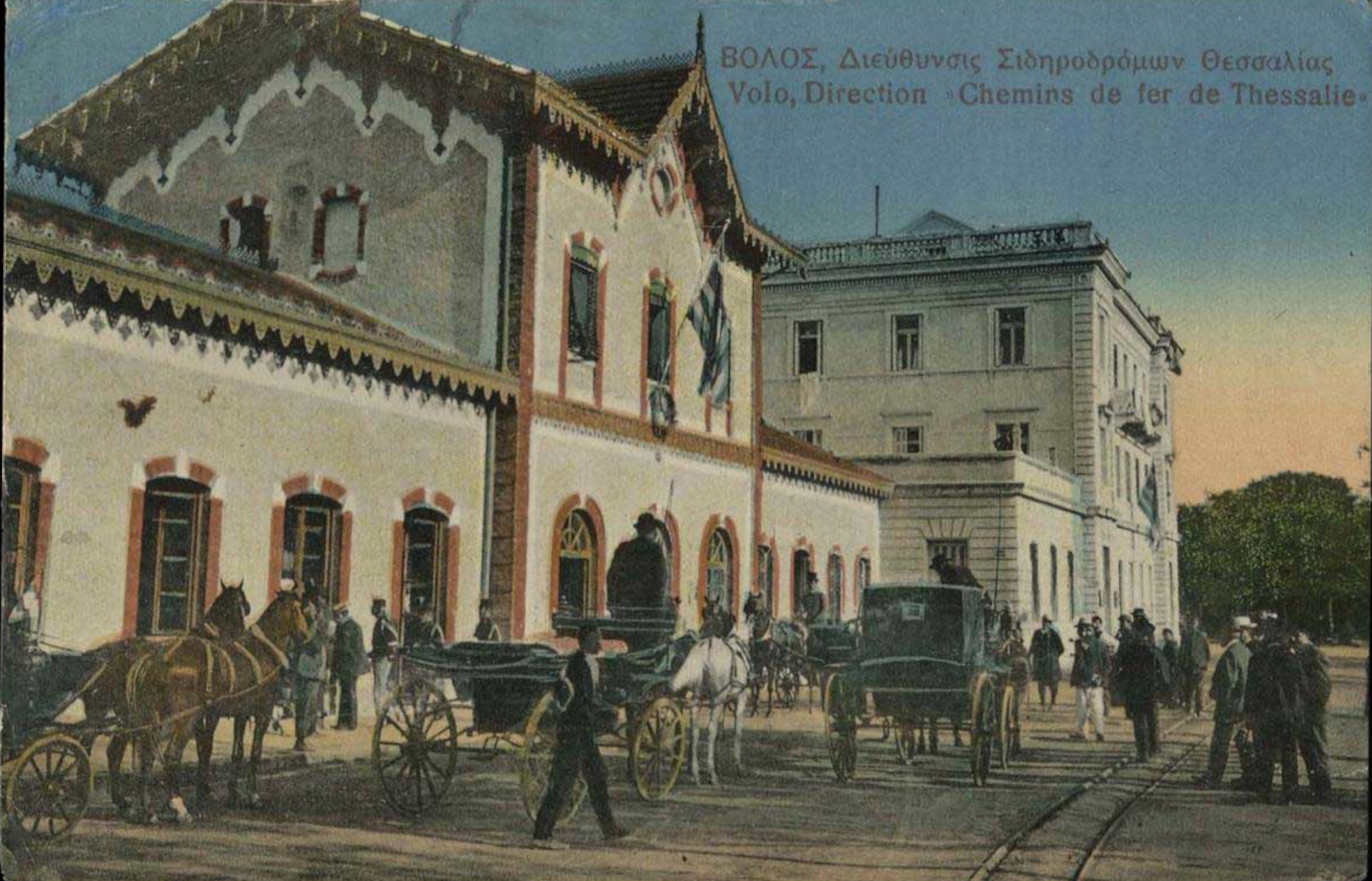
Postcard of the station, ca. 1910

== See also ==
- Railway stations in Greece
- Thessaly Railways
- Hellenic Railways Organization
- Hellenic Train
