= Thessaly Railways =

Private railway company in Greece

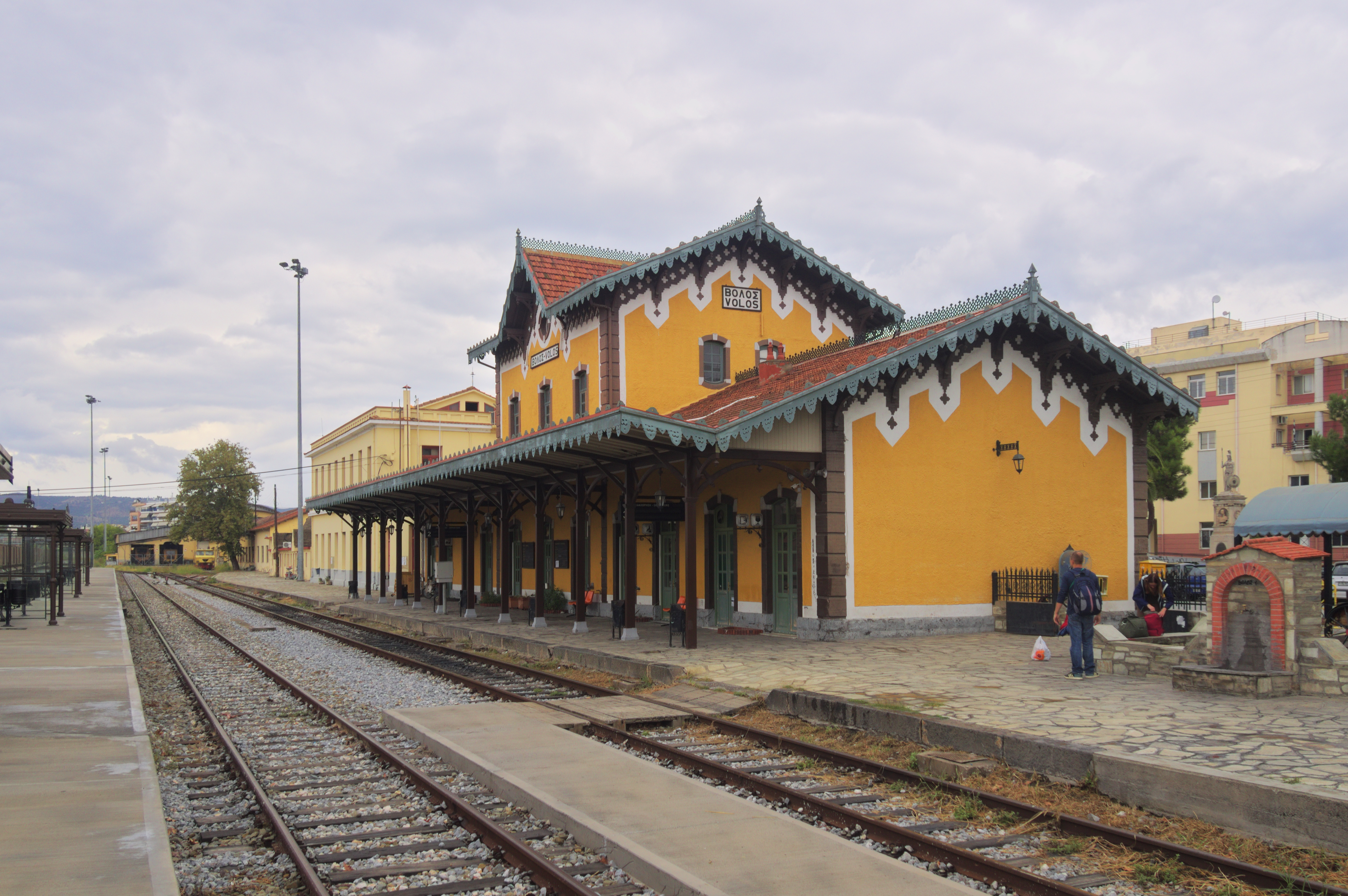
- Volos railway station

Overview
- Native name: Σιδηρόδρομοι Θεσσαλίας
- Owner: Private (1884-1955), Hellenic State Railways (1955–1970); Hellenic Railways Organisation (since 1970)
- Locale: Thessaly

History
- Work began: 1882
- Opened: 22 April 1884
- Completed: 16 June 1886

Technical
- Line length: 203 km (126 mi)
- Track gauge: 1,435 mm (4 ft 8 1/2 in) standard gauge
- Old gauge: 1,000 mm (3 ft 3 3/8 in) metre gauge
- Electrification: partial
Thessaly Railways (1901)
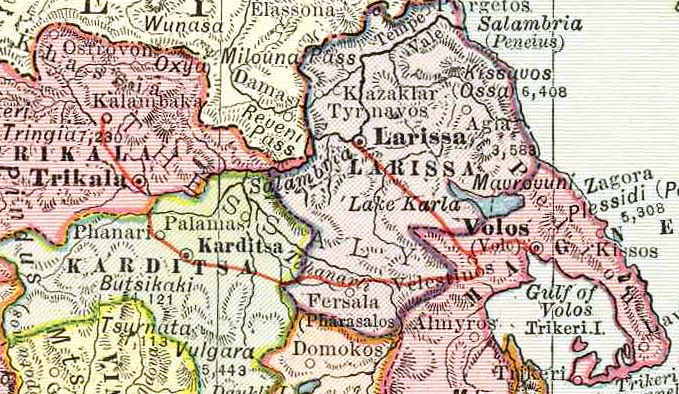

Thessaly Railways (Greek: Σιδηρόδρομοι Θεσσαλίας, romanized: Sidiródromoi Thessalías) was a private railway company in Greece, which owned and operated the metre gauge railway network of Thessaly and the Pelion railway from 1884 to 1955, when the private company was absorbed by the state-owned Hellenic State Railways. Today the term usually refers to the section of mainline between Domokos and Rapsani and its two branches, the West Thessaly branch to Kalambaka and the Volos branch.

== Network and stations ==
The network of Thessaly Railways consisted of the following lines:

- Volos–Velestino. The line extended from Volos station to the city centre along Dimitriados Street.
- Velestino–Kalambaka, connecting with the Athens–Thessaloniki standard gauge mainline at Palaiofarsalos. This section had a maximum gradient of 3% between Velestino and Aerino.
- Velestino–Larissa, terminating at the Thessaly Railways station, next to the mainline (standard gauge) station, with which it was later merged.
- Volos–Mileai (Pelion railway)

Construction started in 1882 under the general management of chief engineer Evaristo de Chirico. The section from Volos to Larissa, 61 kilometres (38 mi) long, was inaugurated on 22 April 1884 by King George I. The 142-kilometre (88 mi) section from Velestino to Kalambaka was completed on 16 June 1886.

== Rolling stock ==
=== Steam locomotives ===
Thessaly railways used 46 metre gauge steam locomotives of various types: All of them were tank locomotives, without tenders.

Photo	Numbers	Type	Quantity	Manufacturer	Serial Nos,	Year	Power (hp)	Power (kW)	Notes
	1–12	0-6-2T	12	Tubize		1883–1887			
	20–24	2-6-0T	5	Tubize		1908	320	240	
	25–27	2-6-0T	3	J. A. Maffei		1912	320	240	
	28–29	2-6-0T	2	Tubize		1920	320	240	
	31–34	0-8-2T	4	Saint-Léonard		1884–1887			
	30–34	2-6-2T	5	Krupp		1935	350	260	
	40–45	2-6-2T	6	Jung		1951	380	280	One of them in storage at Volos, may be restored in working order.
	54	0-8-0T	1	SLM Winterthur		1911	370	280	Ex CF Yverdon–Ste-Croix No. 4
	71	0-6-0T	1			1911			
	72	0-6-0T	1	Krupp		1935	100	70	
	203–205	2-6-0T	3	SLM Winterthur		1948–1949	250	190	Ex Brünigbahn, same numbers
	1055, 1058	0-6-0T	2	SLM Winterthur		1948–1949	250	190	Ex Brünigbahn, same numbers
	A1	0-4-0T	1	Krauss		1940			

=== Railcars - Diesel multiple units ===
Photo	Numbers	Type	Quantity	Manufacturer	Year	Model	Power	Notes
	A1–A14	Bo-2	14	Breda	1951		145 kW (194 hp)	

In addition, three Breda railcars of a different type were transferred to Volos from the Kryoneri–Agrinio line in 1976. Three Linke-Hofmann DMU-2 were transferred in 1978 from the Peloponnese network.

Four class 9401 Mitsumbishi diesel locomotives (numbers 9416 to 9419) were also used in Thessaly after 1973 and were used for shunting and as a replacement of steam locomotives for freight trains.

== The Thessaly network after 1955 ==
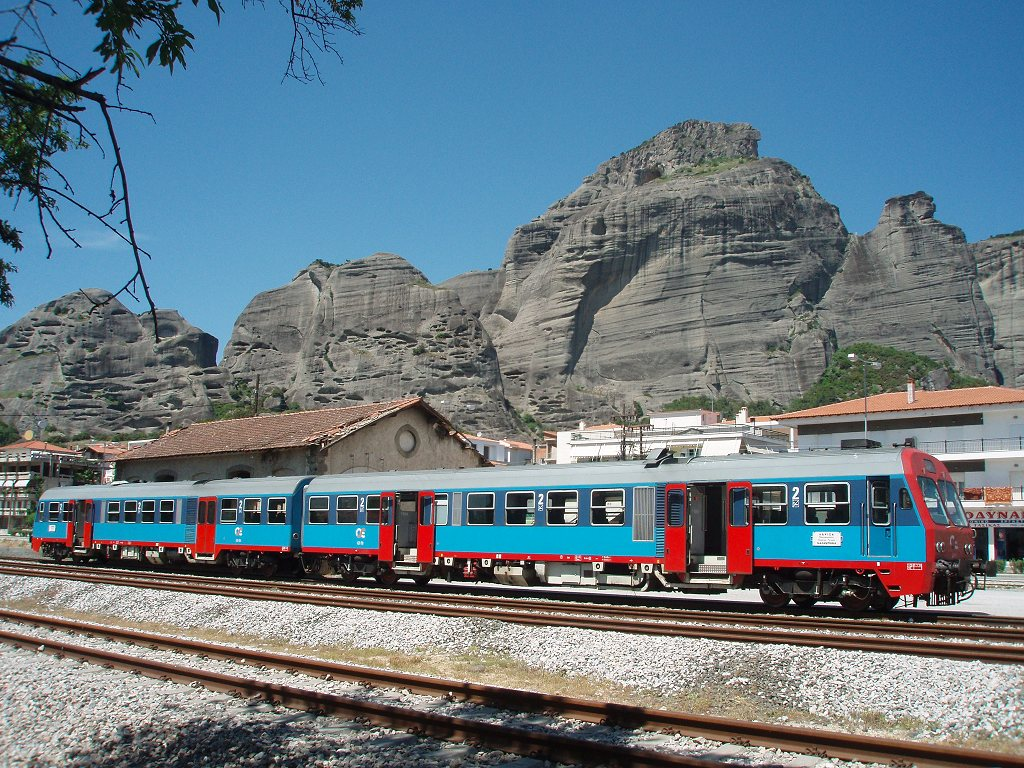
A MAN DMU at Kalambaka station, with the rocks of Meteora in the background

The Hellenic State Railways (OSE) absorbed Thessaly Railways in 1955.

In 1960 the line from Larissa to Volos was converted to standard gauge and was connected at Larissa with the mainline from Athens to Thessaloniki. For the section between Latomeio and Volos the standard gauge line follows a different route with an additional halt at Melissiatika. The standard gauge line is physically connected to the Athens-Thessaloniki mainline, allowing OSE to run through services to Volos from Athens and Thessaloniki. Volos station was converted to dual gauge, in order to accommodate trains of the two branches. Parts of the station and the track towards the city centre were at this period of a unique triple-gauge system: standard gauge for Larissa trains, metre gauge for Kalambaka trains and 600 mm gauge for Pelion trains.

In 1970 the network was taken over by the new Hellenic Railways Organisation, successor of the Hellenic State Railways.

In 2001 the section between Palaiofarsalos and Kalampaka was also converted to standard gauge and physically connected at Palaiofarsalos with the mainline from Athens to Thessaloniki. Volos station was converted to exclusively standard gauge. The section to the city centre was abandoned and covered with asphalt. The remaining metre gauge section (Velestino– Palaiofarsalos) was closed in 1999.

Freight traffic declined sharply when the state-imposed monopoly of OSE for the transport of agricultural products and fertilisers ended in the early 1990s. Many small stations of the network with little passenger traffic were closed down, especially on the mainline section and between Karditsa and Kalambaka. However, travel times improved and the unification of rail gauge allowed direct services, even InterCity services, to link Volos and Kalambaka with Athens and Thessaloniki.

In August 2009, TrainOSE S.A. proceeded to a drastic cutback of passenger services on Thessaly lines. There are only six local trains on each direction on Larissa-Volos line and just four on Palaiofarsalos-Kalambaka. In addition, there is one train from Athens to Kalambana and back (884/885) and one InterCity train from Athens to Volos and back (IC40/IC41).

The mainline of Thessaly was electrified and some services are now using HellasSprinter electric locomotives and Siemens Desiro EMUs. There are proposals to electrify the branch lines as well, in order to allow through services from Volos and Kalambaka to Thessaloniki.

== Preservation ==
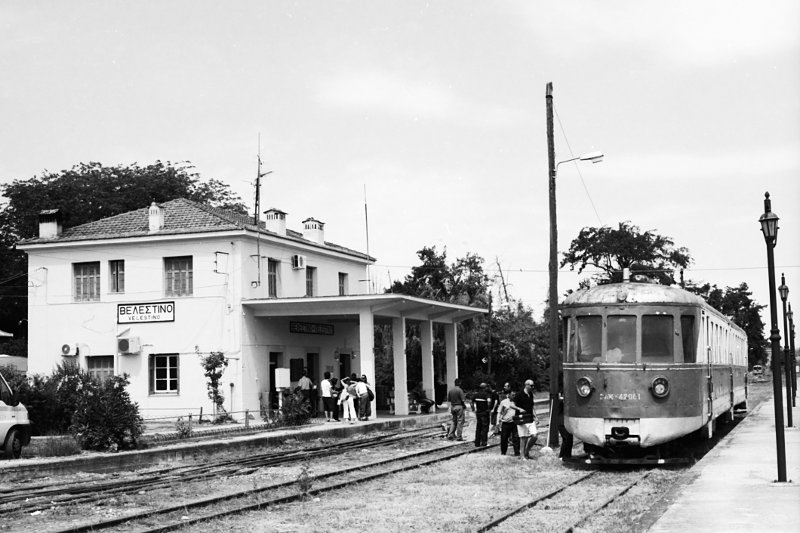
A 1937 vintage DMU for an EMOS special at Velestino (2009)

When the Hellenic Railways Organisation converted the section Palaiofarsalos-Kalambaka to standard gauge as a branch of the mainline, the metre gauge section from Velestino to Palaiofarsalos was cut off. This section is maintained by the Museum Railways Company or EMOS (Greek: Εταιρεία Μουσειακών Σιδηροδρόμων or ΕΜΟΣ). EMOS operates on this section a former SPAP Linke-Hofmann DMU, usually between Velestino and Aerino.

EMOS preserves a variety of rolling stock owned by the Hellenic Railways Organisation under long term loan. Most significant is a vintage Linke-Hofmann DMU-2 (1937), formerly of Piraeus, Athens and Peloponnese Railways. They also have a Nippon Sharyo diesel locomotive, formerly of the Aliveri Coalmines of the Public Power Corporation and there are plans to restore a Jung steam locomotive in storage at Volos.

In addition, the old single line passing through Tempi Valley, which was cut off from the mainline when new tunnels were constructed, is used as a tourist attraction with light railway vehicles.
