= Evaristo de Chirico =

Greek-Italian mechanical and civil engineer (1835–1905)

- Born: 3 December 1841; Palermo, Italy
- Died: 5 May 1905 (aged 63); Athens, Greece
- Spouse: baroness Gemma Cervetto
- Children: Giorgio de Chirico; Andrea de Chirico; Unnamed daughter (died in infancy)

Evaristo de Chirico Greek: Ο Εβαρίστο ντε Κίρικο ή Ευάρεστος Κηρύκος, romanized: Evaristo de Chirico (3 December 1841–5 May 1905) was an Italian-Greek engineer known for his contributions to railway construction in Greece. He played a key role in developing the railway network of Thessaly in the late 19th century. He was the father of the artist Giorgio de Chirico.

== Early life ==
Born into a family a Greek ancestry (the Kyriko or Chirico family was of Greek origin, having moved from Rhodes to Palermo in 1523 together with 4,000 other Greek Catholic families). He was the son of Sicilian barone Giorgio Filigone di Chirico (1794–1875) and Countess Adelaide Mabilli y Bulini (1799–1876). His maternal grandfather, Don Lorenzo Eliondoro Mabilli y Bulini (1763–1853), was the Spanish consul in Corfu and originally from Alicante.

== Career ==
After graduating in engineering, De Chirico specialized in railway construction. He gained recognition for his work with the company Evaristo de Chirico & Co., which built railway lines in Bulgaria. In the early 1880s, Charilaos Trikoupis, then Prime Minister of Greece, commissioned him to design the railway network of Thessaly, a recently annexed region lacking railway infrastructure. De Chirico relocated to Volos, which became the operational centre for the Thessaly Railways. He designed and supervised the construction of Volos railway station and other key infrastructure projects. Construction began in 1882, employing Italian and local workers. The 1,000 mm (3 ft 3 3/8 in) metre gauge Volos–Larissa line, spanning 61 kilometres (38 mi), was inaugurated on 22 April 1884, by King George I. A second branch, extending from Velestino to Kalambaka 142-kilometre (88 mi), was completed by 16 June 1886.

== Later projects and legacy ==
Following the completion of the main metric-gauge lines, De Chirico was tasked with constructing a 600 mm narrow-gauge railway in the mountainous Pelion region. The Pelion railway, which featured two tunnels and nine bridges, was built by his own company’s workers. One of these structures remains known as the De Chirico Bridge. Due to his professional responsibilities, De Chirico moved to Athens, where his second son, Andrea, was born in 1891. In 1899, he relocated his family permanently to Athens to oversee railway projects in Thessaloniki, where he had been appointed supervisor. He died in Athens in 1905 due to health complications. Later, his son Giorgio de Chirico wrote he had been in poor health.

== Family ==
He was the son of Sicilian barone Giorgio Filigone di Chirico (1794–1875) and Countess Adelaide Mabilli y Bulini (1799–1876). His maternal grandfather, Don Lorenzo Eliondoro Mabilli y Bulini (1763–1853), was the Spanish consul in Corfu and originally from Alicante.

He married Gemma Cervetto, Genoese baroness of Greek origins from Smyrna, with whom he had three children: a daughter who did not survive and two sons—painter Giorgio de Chirico and writer Andrea de Chirico.

== Gallery ==
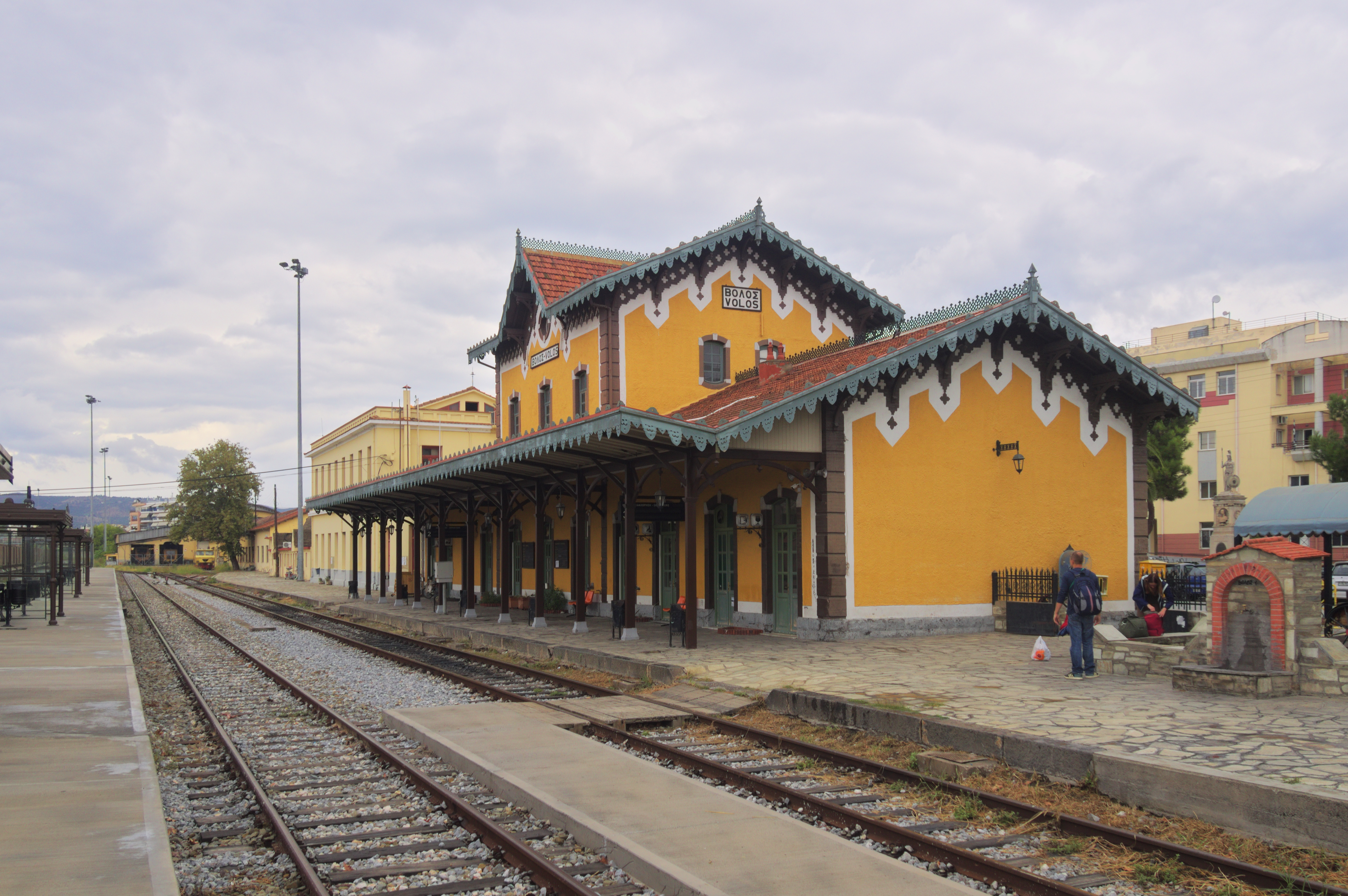
Volos train station, 30 September 2017

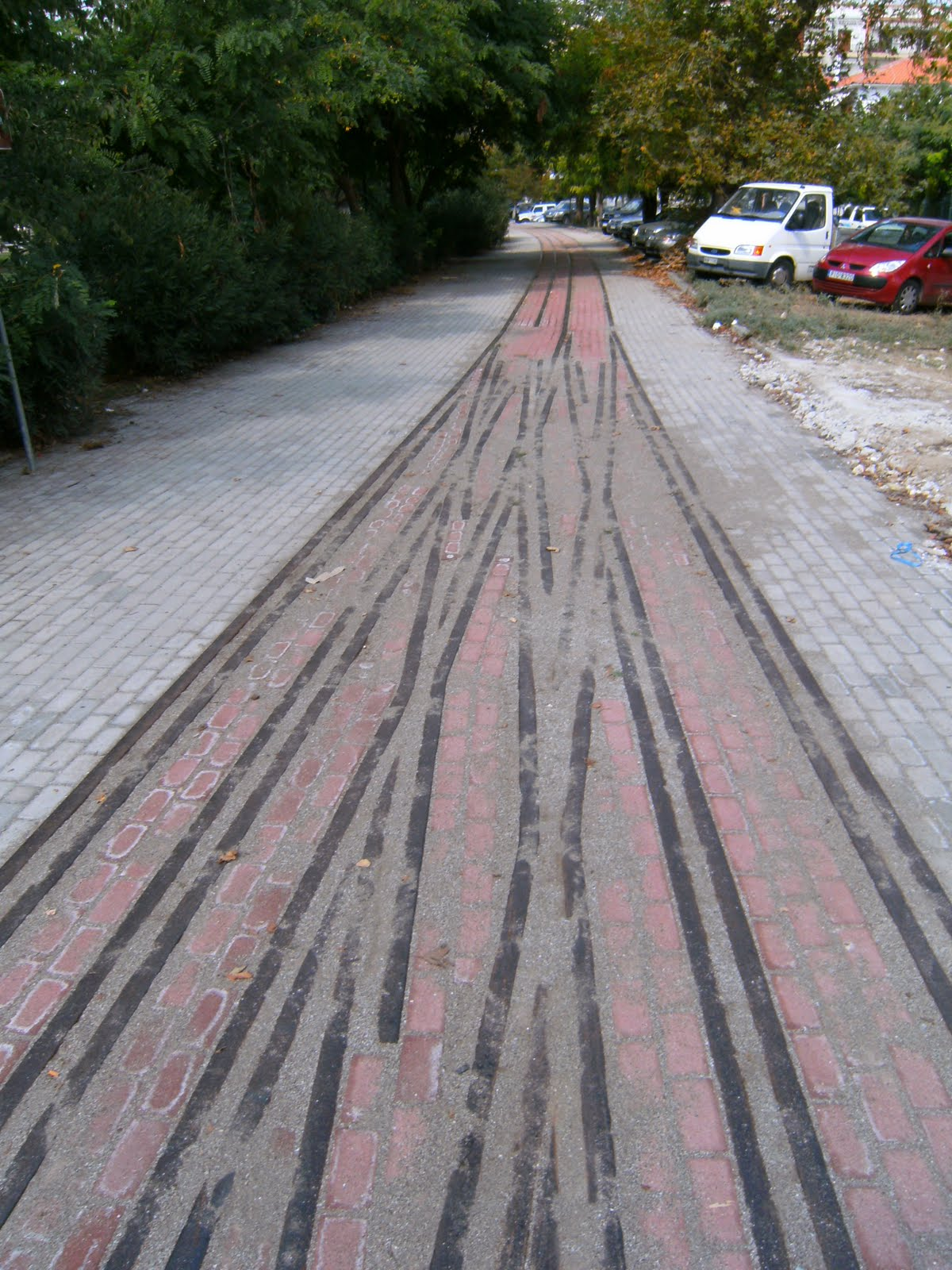
The Metric approaches leading off to Girtoni, 28 September 2009

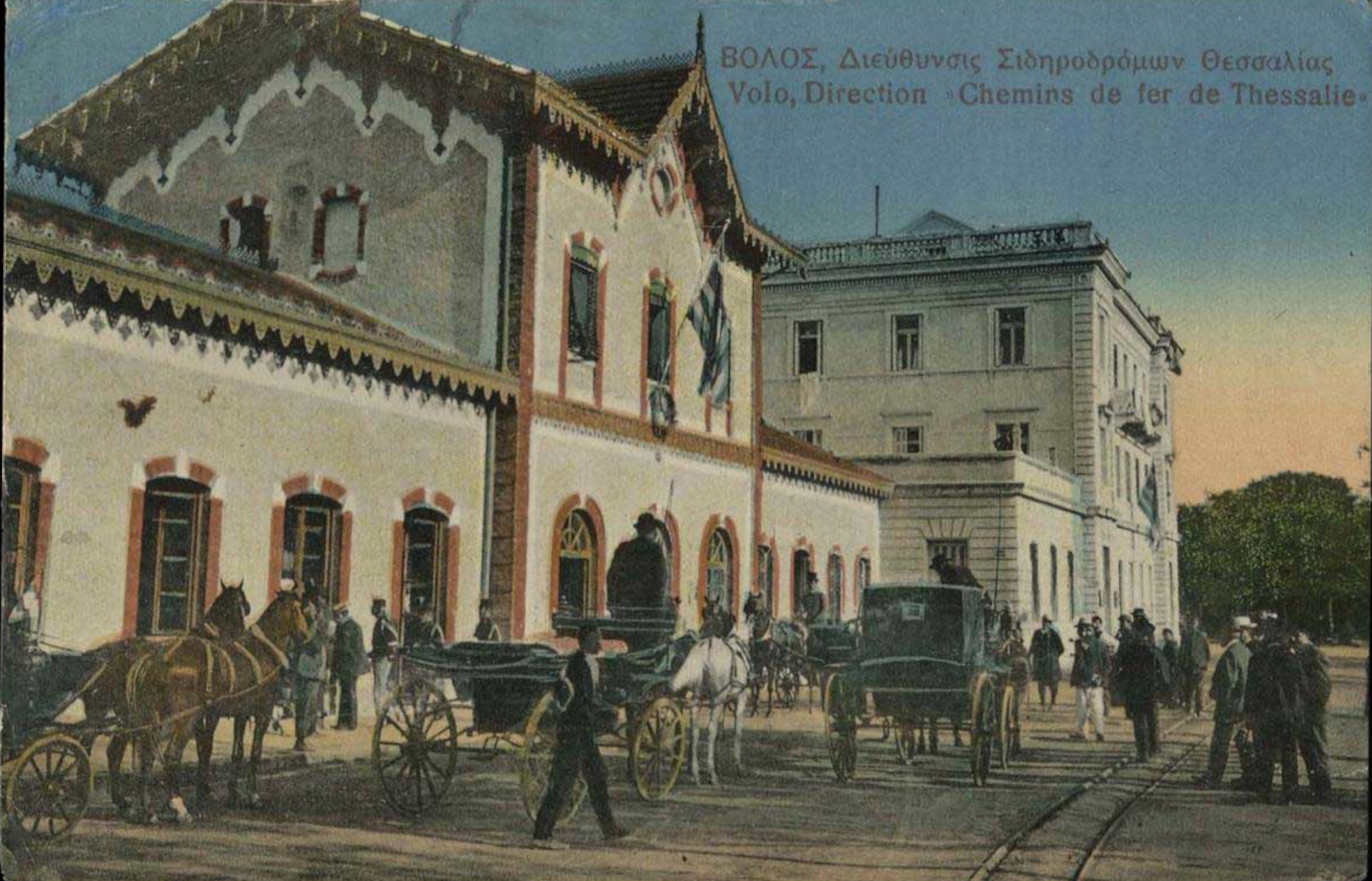
Postcard of the station, ca. 1910

== See also ==
- Thessaly Railways
