= List of disasters in Greece by death toll =

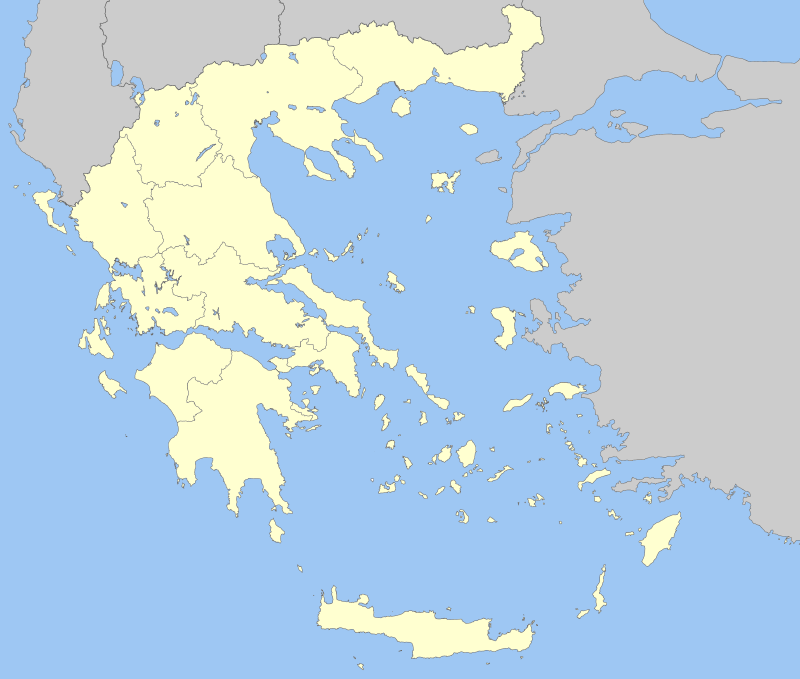
Map of Greece and its regions

This list of Greek disasters by death toll includes major disasters (excluding acts of war) that occurred on Greek soil or involved Greek citizens, in a definable incident. In this list, Greece refers to the Hellenic Republic from 1821 to present.

== over 200 deaths ==
Fatalities	Year	Article	Type	Location	Comments
300,000	1941-1942	Great famine	Famine	Nationwide	
39,258	2020-2023	COVID-19 pandemic in Greece	Pandemic	Nationwide	
3,550	1881	1881 Chios earthquake	Earthquake	Chios, North Aegean	
1,300+	1987	1987 Athens heat wave	Heatwave	Nationwide	
618	1856	1856 Heraklion earthquake	Earthquake	Crete and Rhodes, South Aegean	
550	1867	1867 Lesbos earthquake	Earthquake	Lesbos, North Aegean	
445-800	1953	1953 Ionian earthquake	Earthquake	Ionian Islands	
~400	1947	SS Heimara	Shipwreck	Aegean Sea	
326-600	1886	1886 Peloponnese earthquake	Earthquake	Peloponnese	
~300	1923	Sinking of the Alexander VII	Shipwreck	Off of Psyttaleia, Attica	
225	1894	1894 Atalanti earthquakes	Earthquakes	Central Greece	
200-224	1867	1867 Lixouri earthquake	Earthquake	Lixouri, Ionian Islands	
236	1966	SS Heraklion	Shipwreck	Aegean Sea	

== 100 to 199 deaths ==
Fatalities	Year	Article	Type	Location	Comments
181+	1933	1933 Kos earthquake	Earthquake	Kos, South Aegean	
161-149	1932	1932 Ierissos earthquake	Earthquake	Macedonia	
149	2009-2010	2009 swine flu pandemic	Pandemic	Nationwide	
143	1999	1999 Athens earthquake	Earthquake	Attica	
121	2005	Helios Airways Flight 522	Plane crash	Grammatiko, Attica	
117	1870	1870 Arachova earthquake	Earthquake	Arachova, Central Greece	
104	2018	2018 Attica wildfires	Forest fires	Attica	

== 10 to 99 deaths ==
Fatalities	Year	Article	Type	Location	Comments
90	1969	Olympic Airways Flight 954	Plane crash	near Keratea, Attica	
88	1974	TWA Flight 841 (1974)	Plane crash	Ionian Sea	
85	2007	2007 Greek forest fires	Forest fires	Peloponnese, Attica and Euboea	
81	2000	Express Samina	Shipwreck	Offshore of Paros, South Aegean	
75	1895	1895 Paramythia earthquake	Earthquake	Paramythia, Epirus	
70	1997	Aerosvit Flight 241	Plane crash	Thessaloniki, Macedonia	
63	1991	Mount Othrys disaster	Plane crash	Mount Othrys, Central Greece	
57	2023	Tempi train crash	Train collision	Tempi, Thessaly	
53	1956	1956 Amorgos earthquake	Earthquake	Santorini and Amorgos, South Aegean	
50	1976	Olympic Airways Flight 830	Plane crash	Servia, Macedonia	
49	1978	1978 Thessaloniki earthquake	Earthquake	Macedonia	
44	1947	1947 Douglas DC-4 crash	Plane crash	Hymettus, Attica	
42	1975	1975 Chania German Air Force crash	Plane crash	Chania, Crete, South Aegean	
40	1941	1941 Larissa earthquake	Earthquake	Larissa, Thessaly	
39	1900	Egyptian ship Charkieh	Shipwreck	Karystos Bay, Central Greece	
37	1972	Olympic Airways Flight 506	Plane crash	Voula, Attica	
36	1889	1889 Lesbos earthquake	Earthquake	Lesbos, North Aegean	
34	1968	Corinth rail disaster	Train collision	Derveni, Corinthia, Peloponnese	
34	1989	Olympic Aviation Flight 545	Plane crash	Samos, North Aegean	
~33 (Greek)	1963	TSMS Lakonia	Ship fire and sinking	north of Madeira	
30	1958	1958 Ioannina bus crash	Bus crash	Ioannina, Epirus	
28	2023	2023 Greece wildfires	Forest fires	Widespread	
28	2014	Norman Atlantic	Ship fire	Strait of Otranto	
28	1983	Chrissi Avgi	Shipwreck	Near Cape Caphereus, Central Greece	
26	1995	1995 Aigio earthquake	Earthquake	Western Greece	
25+	1954	1954 Sofades earthquake	Earthquake	Thessaly and Central Greece	
25	1979	1979 Thessaloniki bus crash	Bus crash	Near Thessaloniki	
24	2017	2017 West Attica floods	Floods	Attica	
24	1948	1948 Czech Airlines crash	Plane crash	Mount Taigetos, Peloponnese	
23	1970	1970 Cithaeron HAF C-47 crash	Plane crash	Cithaeron, Central Greece	
22	1949	1949 National Greek Airlines crash	Plane crash	Athens, Attica	
21	1981	Karaiskakis Stadium disaster	Crowd crush	Piraeus, Attica	
21	2003	Tempi road accident disaster	Road accident	Tempi, Thessaly	
21	2017	Cyclone Numa	Tropical Cyclone	Attica	
21	1972	Orfana rail disaster	Train collision	Fyllo, Karditsa, Thessaly	
20-24	1986	1986 Kalamata earthquake	Earthquake	Peloponnese	
20-22	1981	1981 Gulf of Corinth earthquakes	Earthquake	Peloponnese and Athens	
20+	1861	1861 Eliki earthquake	Earthquake	Gulf of Corinth	
20	1968	1968 Aegean Sea earthquake	Earthquake	North Aegean	
20	1996	F/G Dystos	Shipwreck	Offshore of Kymi, Central Greece	
19-67	1957	1957 Fethiye earthquakes	Earthquake	Rhodes, South Aegean	
19	1959	Olympic Airways Flight 214	Plane crash	Avlona, Attica	
19	1954	1954 Elefsina Air Base crash	Plane crash	Elefsina Air Base	
17	2023	Storm Daniel	Tropical Cyclone	Thessaly and Central Greece	
17	1983	1983 Salonica-Athens bus crash	Bus crash	Attica	
17	2004	2004 Hellenic Army Chinook crash	Helicopter crash	Off of Mount Athos	
17	1956	1956 Elefsina Air Base crash	Plane crash	Elefsina Air Base	
17	1943	1943 Rhodes SM.75 crash	Plane crash	Maritsa, Rhodes, South Aegean	
14	1979	Swissair Flight 316	Plane crash	Athens, Attica	
14	1979	1979 Samos bus crash	Bus crash	Samos, North Aegean	
13	1993	1993 Ikaria forest fire	Forest fire	Ikaria, North Aegean	
11	2022	Euroferry Olympia fire	Ship fire	Off of Corfu, Ionian Islands	
11	1982	1982 US Navy C-1A Trader crash	Plane crash	Chania, Crete, South Aegean	
10	1952	1952 USAF C-124 crash	Plane crash	Aroania, Peloponnese	
10	1994	1994 Aigeiros helicopter crash	Helicopter crash	Aigeiros, Eastern Macedonia and Thrace	
10	2013	Collision between the M/V Consouth and the M/V Pirireis	Ship collision	Offshore of Peloponnese	

== See also ==
- List of rail accidents in Greece
- List of earthquakes in Greece
- List of disasters in Croatia by death toll
- List of disasters in Romania by death toll
- List of disasters in Spain by death toll
