= List of rail accidents in Greece =

This is a list of rail accidents in Greece.

== List ==
| Accident | Date | Killed | Injured | Description |
|---|---|---|---|---|
| Corinth rail disaster | 30 September 1968 | 34 | 150 | Two passenger trains carrying people returning to Athens after voting in their home towns in the constitutional referendum of 1968 collided near Derveni, Corinth, killing 34 people and injuring 150. |
| Kryoneri train crash | 23 December 1971 | 5 | 34 | Two passenger trains, a railcar and a commercial train collide, five dead, including the railcar driver. |
| Orfana rail disaster | 16 January 1972 | 21 | 40 | At around 16:45, a breakdown in communication between the corresponding stationmasters at Doxaras and Orfana caused an express train and a military relief train to collide in bad weather on the single track line. The southbound diesel hauled Acropolis Express and northbound Number 121 Athens-Thessaloniki were allowed to proceed without first allowing a passing loop. Twenty-one people died, and more than 40 were injured. Nikolaos Gekas, the stationmaster at Orfana was sentenced to five years for his part in the disaster. In the same year, Yiannis Ritsos wrote the tragedy-related song "Ide kai de", composed by Nikos Mamagakis and performed by Yiannis Poulopoulos. |
| Platania accident | 25 July 1982 | 4 | 57 | A train derailed and overturned outside the village of Platania, Drama, killing four and injuring 57 passengers. |
| Tithorea 1994 derailment | 11 September 1994 | 5 | 0 | An InterCity from Athens to bound for Volos, derailed killing five. |
| Strait of Chalkida incident | 17 November 1999 | 3 | 0 | On 17 November 1999, three technicians were working on the maintenance of the Oinoi–Chalcis line. Around noon, the men were surprised by a passing train. Train 1538 swept them away and crushed their bodies. |
| Orestiada accident | 18 December 2001 | 1 | 0 | A train became stuck in a snow drift and derailed near the Bulgarian border in temperatures that fell to −20°C. |
| Kilkis accident | 1 August 2005 | 1 | 0 | A truck driver was struck by a train and killed after ignoring warnings at a crossing. |
| Chryso 2006 accident | 17 February 2006 | 2 | 18 | Two dead and 18 injured in a collision between a train and an agricultural vehicle that had stopped on the railway tracks. The driver of the car and a passenger were killed. [15] |
| Larissa 2008 accident | 8 March 2008 | 0 | 28 | An Alexandroupolis-bound InterCity train derailed 2 kilometres (1.2 mi) outside Larissa. Initial reports indicated human error when the station master failed to change the points after a previous train had passed through the station, causing five carriages from the passenger train to jump the tracks. The two drivers of the derailed train were taken in for questioning, and the station master fled the scene. |
| Achladokampos 2010 collision | 9 December 2010 | 1 | 0 | One person was killed in a derailment on the Nafplio-Argos-Tripoli line. |
| Kryoneri crash | 6 April 2012 | 2 | 2 | A car, in which an elderly couple were riding, is hit at an unmanned level crossing by an Intercity train after becoming trapped on the line. Two are killed. |
| Lianokladi 2013 collision | December 2013 | 0 | 2 | Shortly after 10:30 a.m., a train collided with a large animal on the tracks shortly after passing Asopos, causing one of the cars to derail. The driver and a passenger were slightly injured. |
| Chryso 2016 accident | 16 May 2016 | 2 | ? | A shifter collided with a Unimog line motor vehicle, resulting in the death of the two occupants of the Unimog. |
| Adendro train derailment | 13 May 2017 | 3 | 10 | An InterCity passenger train, with 70 passengers on board, derailed and collided with a house in Adendro. The reason for the accident was determined to have been excessive speed. Three dead, the driver, the traffic supervisor and a passenger. |
| Larissa 2018 accident | 3 August 2018 | 0 | 2 | A Stylida-bound train derailed at Larissa station. The train left the tracks and collided with a wall of a building as it entered the station. Initial reports indicate an unknown person or persons in the control room had switched the points sending the train straight into the building. This raised the issue of rail safety in Greece. |
| Kalochori 2018 accident | 15 December 2018 | 1 | 0 | An agricultural tractor driven by an 84-year-old citizen collided at the height of Kalochori, Serres, with a passenger train running the Alexandroupolis-Thessaloniki route, resulting in the fatal injury of the 84-year-old. |
| Xanthi 2019 accident | 20 July 2019 | 1 | 0 | A train hit and killed a person. |
| Diavata 2019 accident | 19 August 2019 | 1 | 1 | A collision between a train and a passenger car at an unguarded crossing, one person was killed and another injured. |
| Tempi train crash | 28 February 2023 | 57 | 85 | A delayed InterCity passenger train travelling from Athens to Thessaloniki collided head-on with an intermodal train going the opposite way on the same stretch of track with both partially derailing near Larissa. With at least 57 dead, 80 injured and others unaccounted for, it is the worst railway disaster in the history of railways in Greece. It has been attributed to human error. |

== See also ==
- List of rail accidents
- List of rail accidents by country

== Sources ==
- Semmens, Peter (1994). Railway Disasters of the World: Principal Passenger Train Accidents of the 20th Century. Patrick Stephens Ltd. ISBN 1-85260-323-2.
