= 1993 =

1993 in various calendars
- Gregorian calendar: 1993; MCMXCIII
- Ab urbe condita: 2746
- Armenian calendar: 1442; ԹՎ ՌՆԽԲ
- Assyrian calendar: 6743
- Baháʼí calendar: 149–150
- Balinese saka calendar: 1914–1915
- Bengali calendar: 1399–1400
- Berber calendar: 2943
- British Regnal year: 41 Eliz. 2 – 42 Eliz. 2
- Buddhist calendar: 2537
- Burmese calendar: 1355
- Byzantine calendar: 7501–7502
- Chinese calendar: 壬申年 (Water Monkey); 4690 or 4483 — to — 癸酉年 (Water Rooster); 4691 or 4484
- Coptic calendar: 1709–1710
- Discordian calendar: 3159
- Ethiopian calendar: 1985–1986
- Hebrew calendar: 5753–5754
- Hindu calendars
- Vikram Samvat: 2049–2050
- Shaka Samvat: 1914–1915
- Kali Yuga: 5093–5094
- Holocene calendar: 11993
- Igbo calendar: 993–994
- Iranian calendar: 1371–1372
- Islamic calendar: 1413–1414
- Japanese calendar: Heisei 5 (平成５年)
- Javanese calendar: 1925–1926
- Juche calendar: 82
- Julian calendar: Gregorian minus 13 days
- Korean calendar: 4326
- Minguo calendar: ROC 82 民國82年
- Nanakshahi calendar: 525
- Thai solar calendar: 2536
- Tibetan calendar: ཆུ་ཕོ་སྤྲེ་ལོ་ (male Water-Monkey); 2119 or 1738 or 966 — to — ཆུ་མོ་བྱ་ལོ་ (female Water-Bird); 2120 or 1739 or 967
- Unix time: 725846400 – 757382399

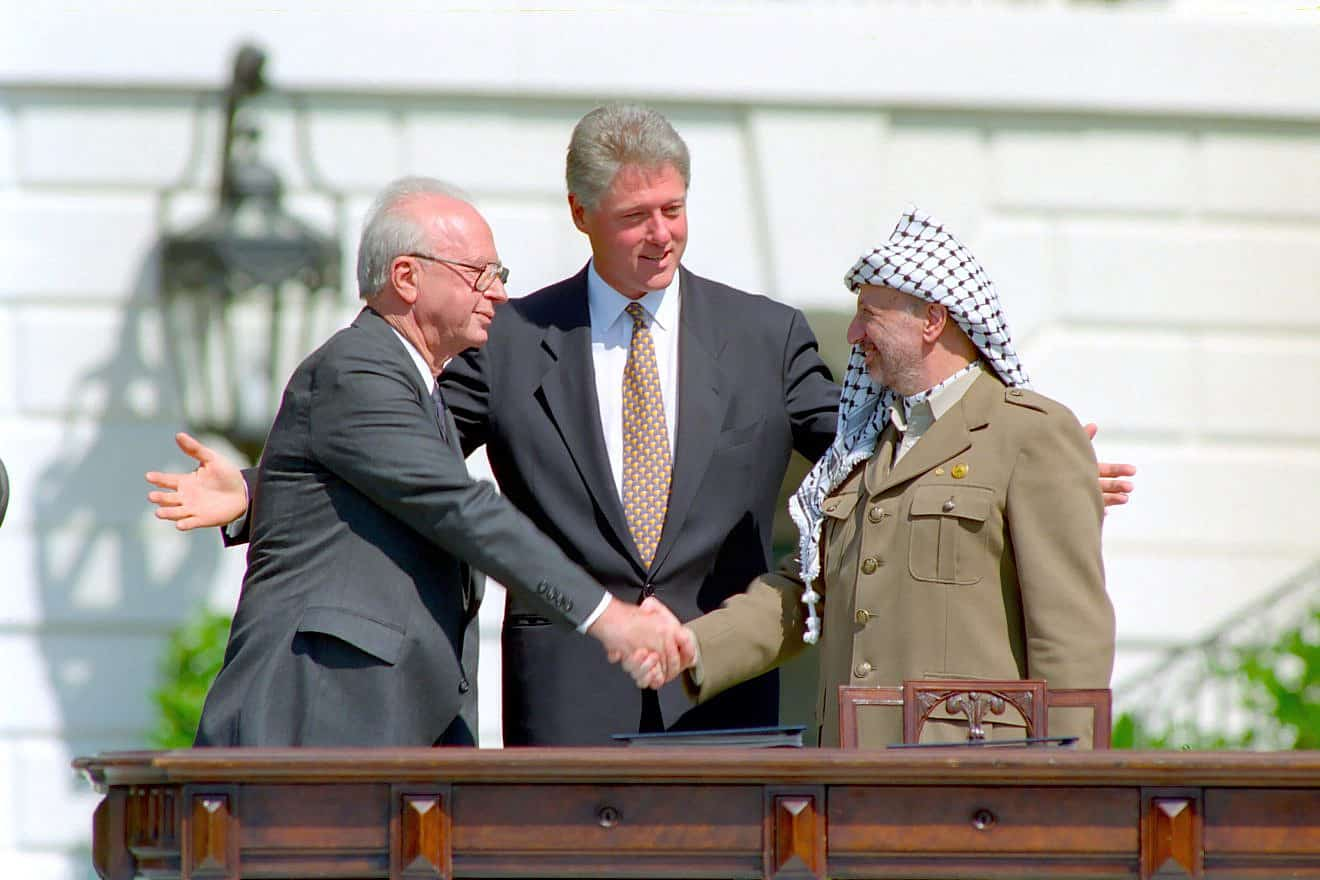
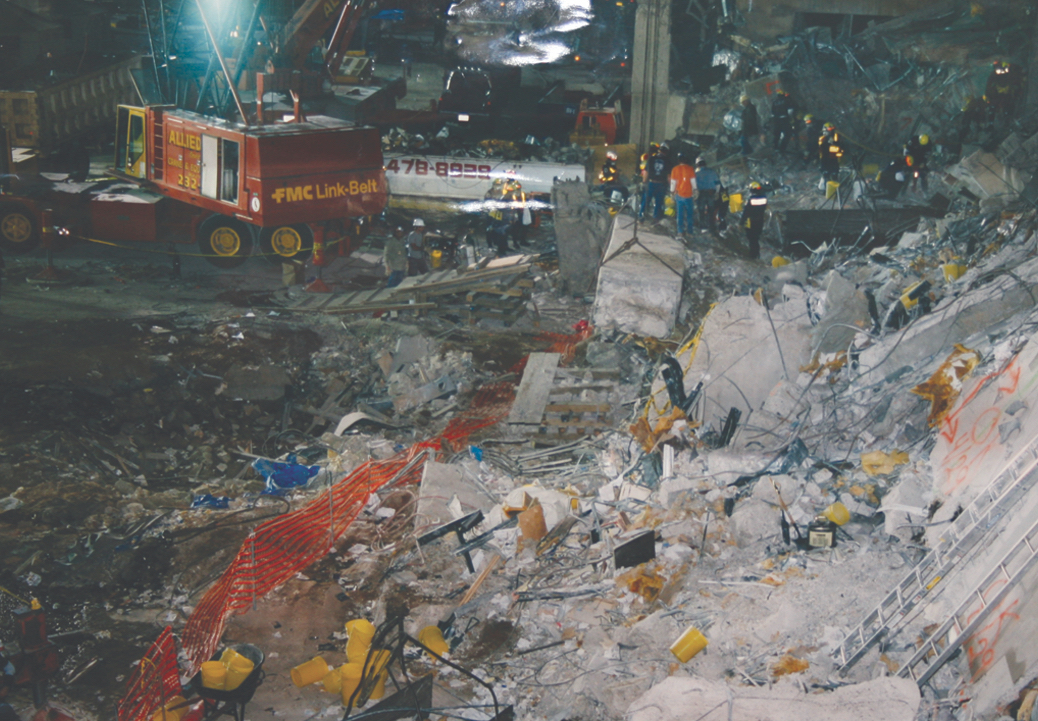
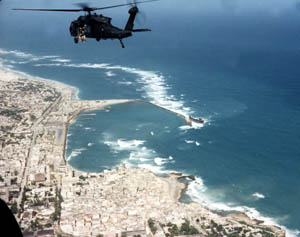
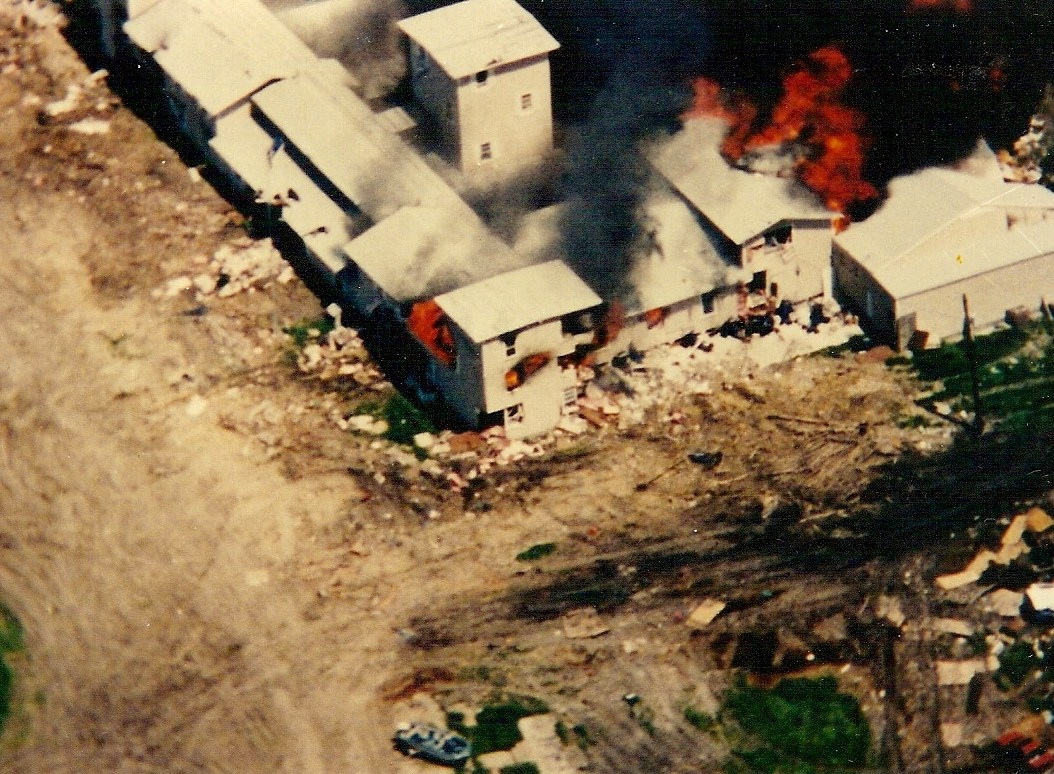
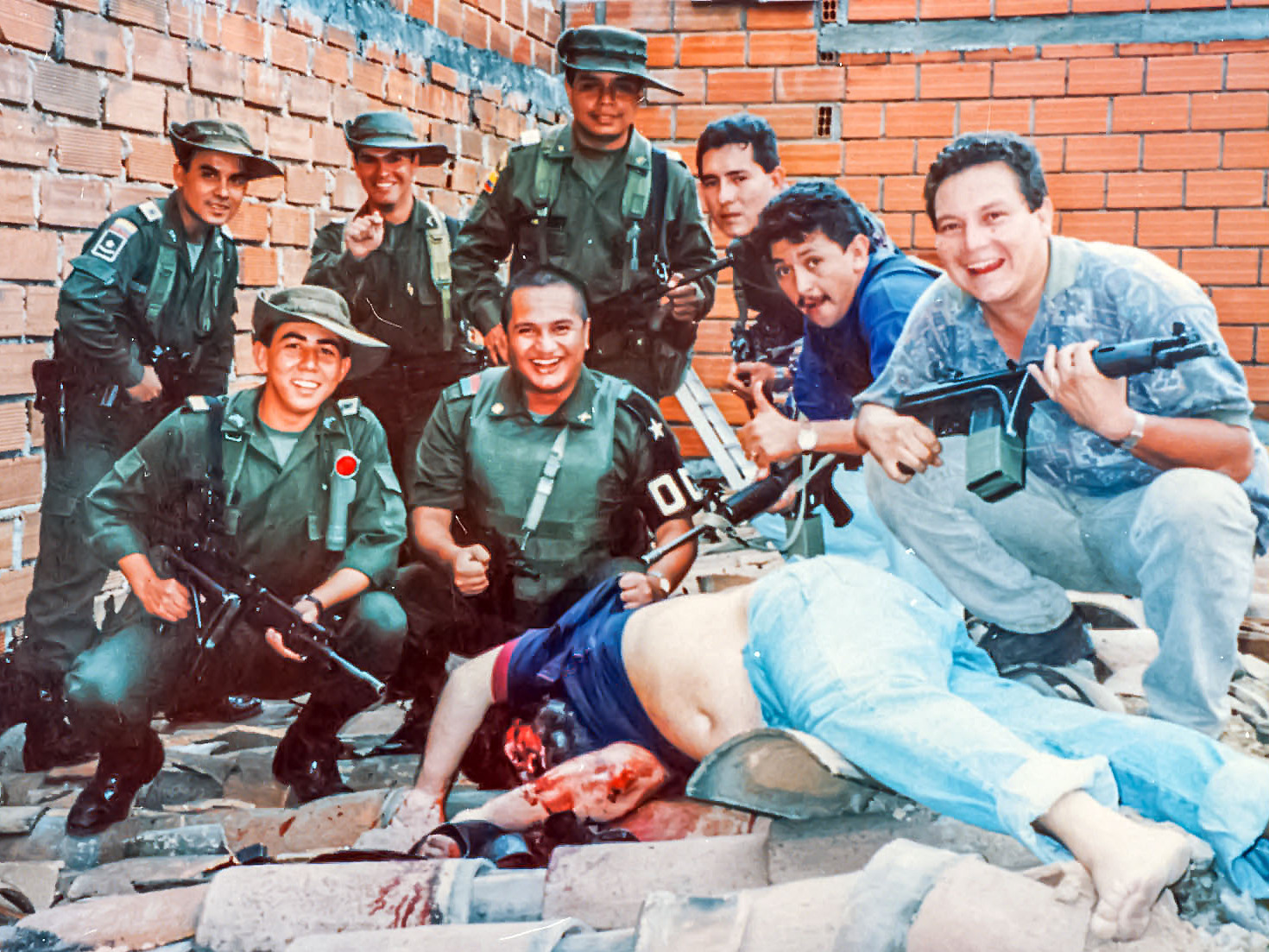
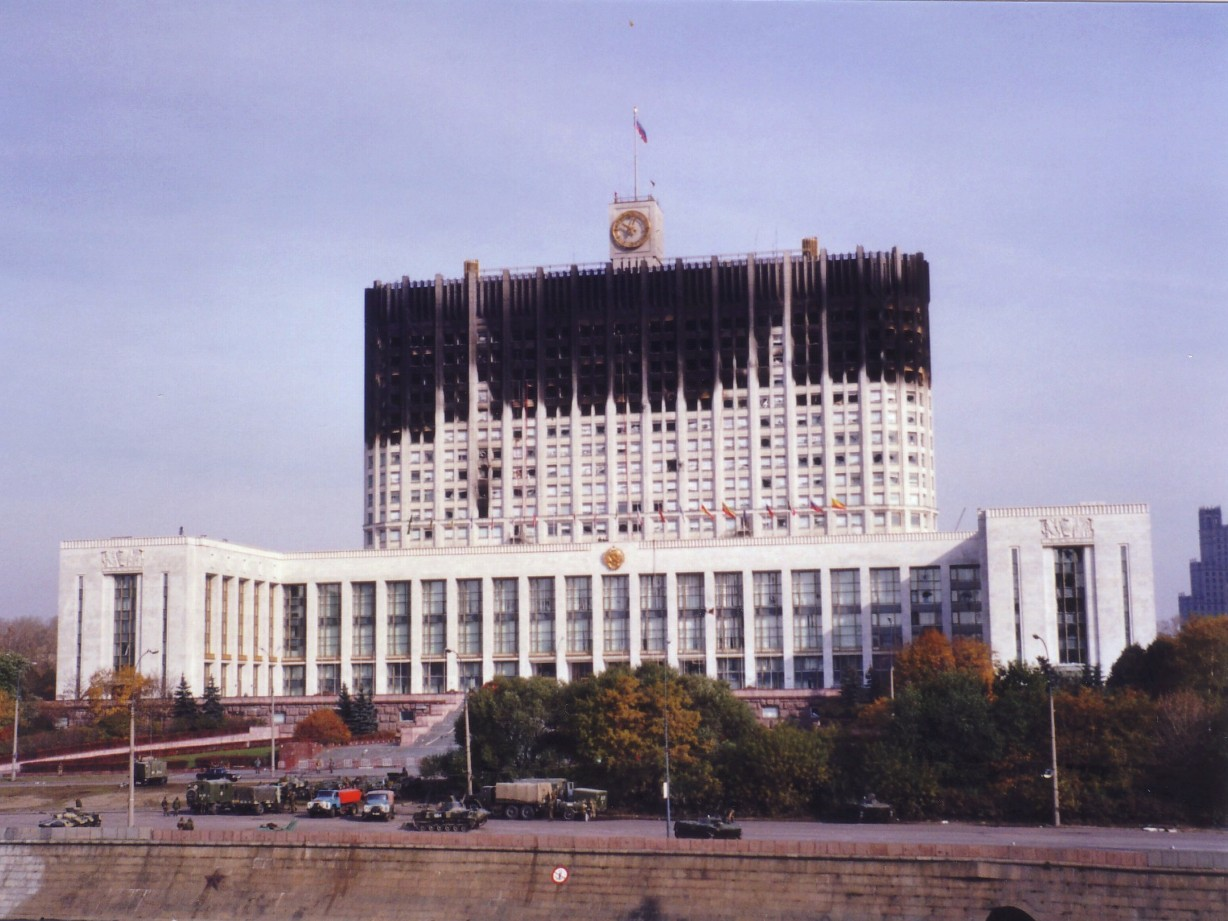
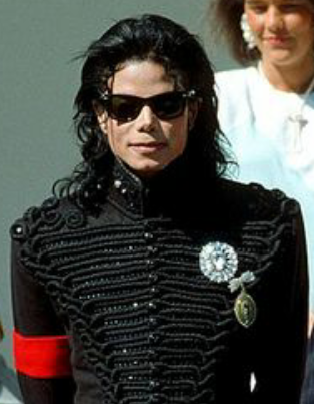
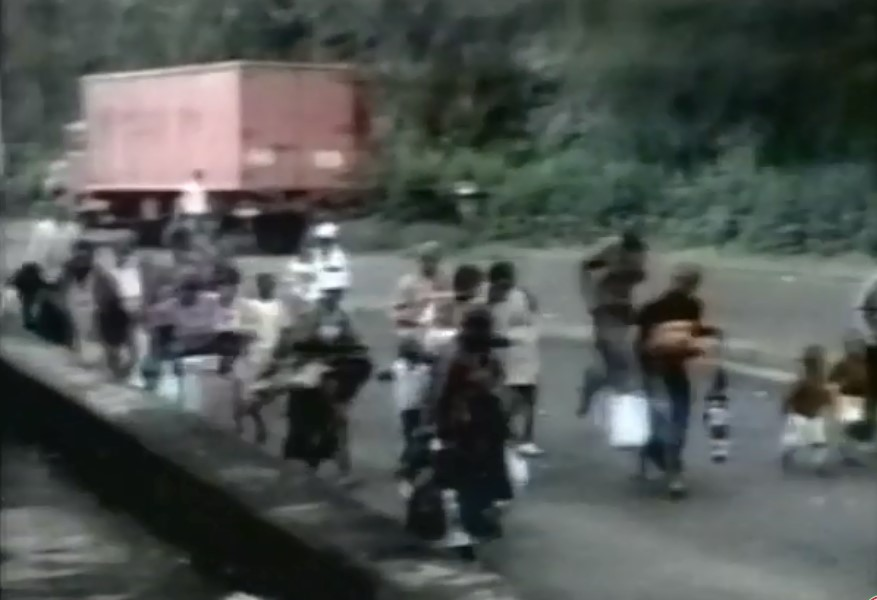
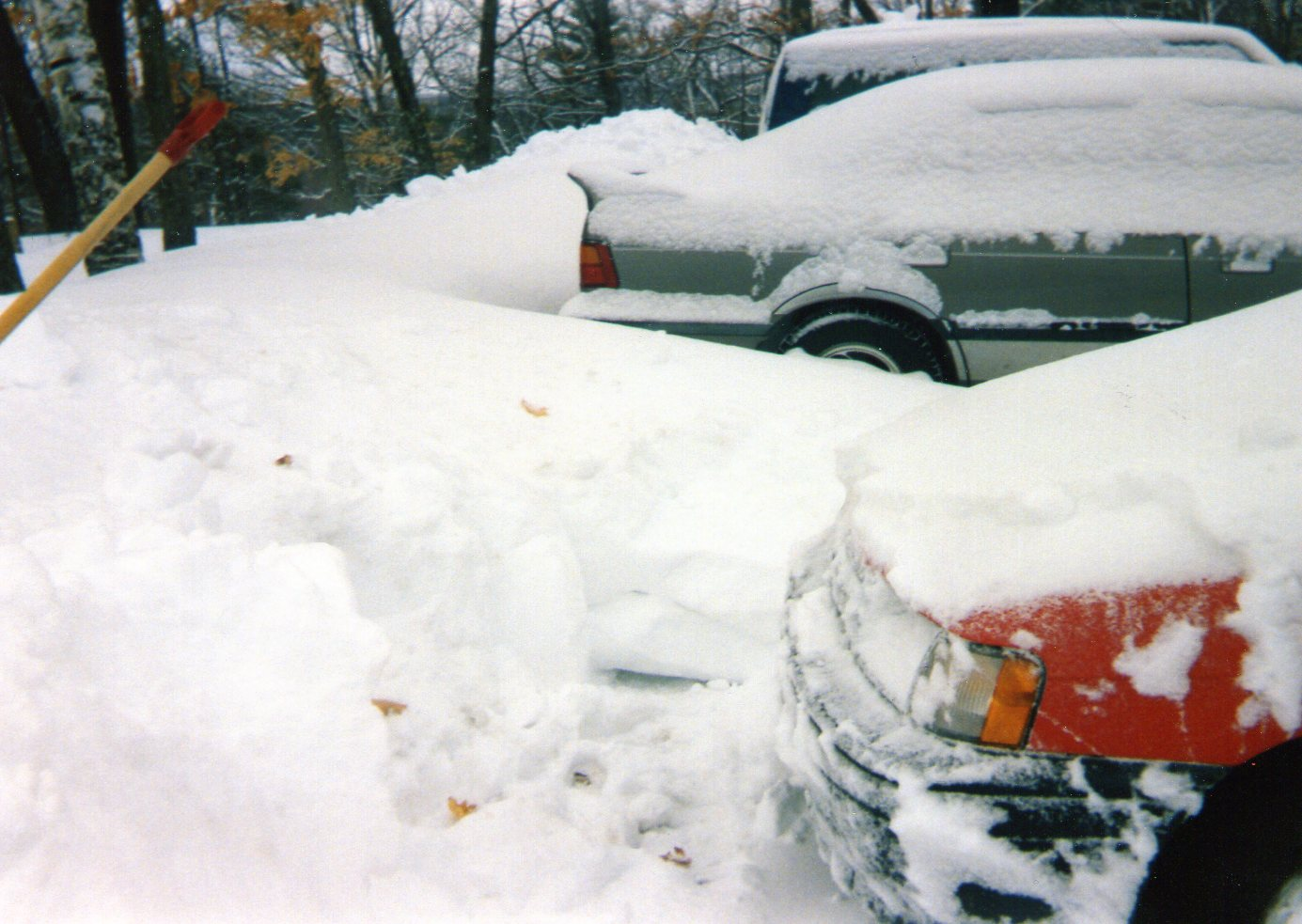
From top to bottom, left to right: the Oslo Accords are signed between Israel and the Palestine Liberation Organization; the 1993 World Trade Center bombing kills six people and injures more than 1,000 in New York City; the Battle of Mogadishu takes place during the Somali Civil War; the Waco siege ends in a deadly fire after a 51-day standoff; Pablo Escobar is killed by Colombian security forces; the 1993 Russian constitutional crisis culminates in the shelling of the Russian parliament; Michael Jackson is accused of sexual abuse; the Burundian Civil War begins following the assassination of President Melchior Ndadaye; and the 1993 Storm of the Century brings widespread destruction across eastern North America.

1993 (MCMXCIII) was a common year starting on Friday of the Gregorian calendar, the 1993rd year of the Common Era (CE) and Anno Domini (AD) designations, the 993rd year of the 2nd millennium, the 93rd year of the 20th century, and the 4th year of the 1990s decade.

The General Assembly of the United Nations designated 1993 as:

- International Year for the World's Indigenous People

The year 1993 in the Kwajalein Atoll in the Marshall Islands had only 364 days, since its calendar advanced 24 hours to the Eastern Hemisphere side of the International Date Line, skipping August 21, 1993.

== Events ==
=== January ===
- January 1
  - Czechoslovakia ceases to exist, as the Czech Republic and Slovakia separate in the Dissolution of Czechoslovakia.
  - The European Economic Community eliminates trade barriers and creates a European single market.
- January 3 – In Moscow, Presidents George H. W. Bush (United States) and Boris Yeltsin (Russia) sign the second Strategic Arms Reduction Treaty.
- January 5
  - US$7.4 million is stolen from the Brink's Armored Car Depot in Rochester, New York, in the fifth largest robbery in U.S. history.
  - MV Braer, a Liberian-registered oil tanker, runs aground off the Scottish island of Mainland, Shetland, causing a massive oil spill.
- January 6
  - Douglas Hurd is the first high-ranking British official to visit Argentina since the Falklands War.
  - January 6–20 – The Bombay riots take place in Mumbai.
- January 7 – The Fourth Republic of Ghana is inaugurated, with Jerry Rawlings as president.
- January 8–17 – The Braer Storm of January 1993, the most intense extratropical cyclone on record for the northern Atlantic Ocean, occurs.
- January 11 – WWE introduce their television program, Monday Night Raw.
- January 13
  - The Chemical Weapons Convention (CWC) is signed by President George H. W. Bush.
  - Iraq disarmament crisis: US, British and French aircraft attack Iraqi Surface to Air Missile sites in Southern Iraq.
- January 14 – The Polish ferry MS Jan Heweliusz sinks off the coast of Rügen in the Baltic Sea, killing 54 people.
- January 19 – Iraq disarmament crisis: Iraq refuses to allow UNSCOM inspectors to use its own aircraft to fly into Iraq and begins military operations in the demilitarized zone between Iraq and Kuwait, and the northern Iraqi no-fly zones. U.S. forces fire approximately 40 Tomahawk cruise missiles at Baghdad factories linked to Iraq's illegal nuclear weapons program (→ January 1993 airstrikes on Iraq). Iraq then informs UNSCOM that it will be able to resume its flights.
- January 20 – Bill Clinton and Al Gore are inaugurated as US President and Vice President.
- January 22 – Hungarian politician Istvan Csurka, of the Hungarian Democratic Forum, calls on the nation to rally against an alleged anti-Hungarian conspiracy led by Jews, liberals, Communists, and Westerners.
- January 24 – In Turkey, thousands protest against the murder of journalist Uğur Mumcu.
- January 25 – Social Democrat Poul Nyrup Rasmussen succeeds Conservative Poul Schlüter as Prime Minister of Denmark.
- January 26 – Václav Havel is elected President of the Czech Republic.
- January 30 – The Red Line (later known as the B Line) officially begins service in Los Angeles, becoming the first underground rapid transit line to open in almost 70 years.

=== February ===
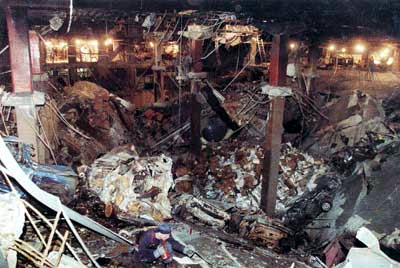
The aftermath of the World Trade Center bombing.

- February 4 – Members of the right-wing Austrian Freedom Party of Austria split to form the Liberal Forum in protest against the increasing nationalistic bent of the party.
- February 10
  - Lien Chan is named by Lee Teng-hui to succeed Hau Pei-tsun as Premier of the Republic of China.
  - Mani pulite scandal: Italian legislator Claudio Martelli resigns, followed by various politicians over the next two weeks.
- February 12 – Murder of James Bulger: Two-year-old James Bulger is abducted from New Strand Shopping Centre by two ten-year-old boys Robert Thompson and Jon Venables, who later torture and murder him.
- February 14
  - Glafcos Clerides defeats incumbent George Vasiliou in the Cypriot presidential election.
  - Albert Zafy defeats Didier Ratsiraka in the Madagascar presidential election.
- February 15 – Abortion in Poland: Lech Walesa signs into law one of the strictest anti-abortion laws in Eastern Europe, banning abortion for any reason other than rape, incest, genetic deformity, or if the mother's life is in danger. Polish women seeking elective abortions must hereafter travel to the Czech Republic.
- February 22 – United Nations Security Council Resolution 808 is voted on, deciding that "an international tribunal shall be established" to prosecute violations of international law in Yugoslavia. The tribunal is established on May 25 by Resolution 827.
- February 26 – World Trade Center bombing: In New York City, a van bomb parked below the North Tower of the World Trade Center explodes, killing six people and injuring over one thousand.

=== March ===
- March 5 – Macedonian Palair Flight 301, an F-100 on a flight to Zürich, crashes shortly after take-off from Skopje, killing 83 of the 97 on board.
- March 8 – The Moon moves into its nearest point to Earth, called perigee, at the same time as its fullest phase of the Lunar Cycle. The Moon appears to be 14% bigger and 30% brighter than the year's other full moons. The next time these two events coincided was in 2008.
- March 11 – Janet Reno is confirmed by the United States Senate and sworn in the next day, becoming the first female Attorney General of the United States.
- March 12
  - 1993 Bombay bombings: Several bombs explode in Bombay, India, killing 257 and injuring hundreds more.
  - North Korea nuclear weapons program: North Korea announces that it plans to withdraw from the Nuclear Nonproliferation Treaty and refuses to allow inspectors access to nuclear sites, beginning the 1993–94 North Korean Nuclear Crisis.
- March 13–15 – The 1993 Storm of the Century strikes the eastern U.S., bringing record snowfall and other severe weather all the way from Cuba to Quebec; it reportedly kills 184 people.
- March 13 – 1993 Australian federal election: Paul Keating's Labor government is re-elected with an increased majority, defeating the Liberal/National Coalition led by John Hewson.
- March 17 – The Kurdistan Workers' Party announces a unilateral ceasefire in Iraq.
- March 24
  - The Israeli Knesset elects Ezer Weizman as President of Israel.
  - South Africa officially abandons its nuclear weapons programme. President de Klerk announces that the country's six warheads had already been dismantled in 1989.
- March 27
  - Jiang Zemin becomes President of China.
  - Following a rash of integrist murders (including those of foreigners), Algeria breaks diplomatic relations with Iran, accusing the country of interfering in its interior affairs.
  - Mahamane Ousmane is elected president of Niger.
- March 28 – 1993 French legislative election: Rally for the Republic (Gaullist party) wins a majority and Édouard Balladur becomes Prime Minister.
- March 29 – The 65th Academy Awards, hosted by Billy Crystal, are held at the Dorothy Chandler Pavilion in Los Angeles, with Unforgiven winning Best Picture.

=== April ===
- April–May – 1993 Four Corners hantavirus outbreak: Thirteen people are killed by Hantavirus pulmonary syndrome, mainly in the Southwestern United States.
- April–October – Great Flood of 1993: The Mississippi and Missouri Rivers flood large portions of the American Midwest.
- April 8 – The Republic of Macedonia is admitted to the United Nations under a provisional reference "the former Yugoslav Republic of Macedonia".
- April 11 – Four hundred fifty prisoners rioted at the Southern Ohio Correctional Facility in Lucasville, Ohio, and continued to do so for ten days, citing grievances related to prison conditions, as well as the forced vaccination of Nation of Islam prisoners (for tuberculosis) against their religious beliefs.
- April 14 – Hungary passes a law banning the public display of Fascist and Communist symbols.
- April 16 – Bosnian War: the enclave of Srebrenica is declared a UN-protected "safe area". Also members of the Jokeri unit of the HVO entered the village of Ahmići and killed 120 Muslim residents.
- April 19 – Waco siege: A 51-day stand-off at the Branch Davidian compound near Waco, Texas, ends with a fire that kills 76 people, including David Koresh.
- April 20 – The Council for National Academic Awards, the national degree-awarding authority in the United Kingdom, is officially dissolved.
  - Backstreet Boys were formed in Orlando, Florida.
- April 21 – The Supreme Court in La Paz, Bolivia, sentences former dictator Luis Garcia Meza to 30 years in jail without parole for murder, theft, fraud and violating the constitution.
- April 23
  - The World Health Organization declares tuberculosis a global emergency.
  - Eritreans vote overwhelmingly for independence from Ethiopia in a United Nations-monitored referendum, the 1993 Eritrean independence referendum.
- April 25 – In the 1993 Russian government referendum during the power struggle between President and Parliament a majority expresses confidence in President Yeltsin and his reform politics while rejecting early elections.
  - Pope John Paul II makes an official visit to Albania, accompanied by Mother Teresa. He counsels Albanian Catholics against supporting nationalist violence in Kosovo.
- April 26 – Oscar Luigi Scalfaro appoints Carlo Azeglio Ciampi Prime Minister of Italy.
- April 27
  - Eritrea: Eritrean independence is declared verified by the United Nations.
  - 1993 Yemeni parliamentary election: The General People's Congress of Yemen wins a plurality of 121 seats.
  - 1993 Zambia national football team plane crash: All members of the Zambia national football team die in a plane crash off Libreville, Gabon en route to Dakar, Senegal.
- April 30 – Tennis player Monica Seles – at this time the top-ranked player in women's tennis – is stabbed during a match at the 1993 Citizen Cup in Hamburg, Germany.

=== May ===
- May 1 – Assassination of Ranasinghe Premadasa: During a May Day rally, President of Sri Lanka Ranasinghe Premadasa is assassinated by a Liberation Tigers of Tamil Eelam suicide bomber. Prime Minister Dingiri Banda Wijetunga succeeds Premadasa as the 3rd executive president of Sri Lanka.
- May 4 – UNOSOM II assumes the Somali duties of the dissolved UNITAF.
- May 9 – Juan Carlos Wasmosy becomes the first democratically elected President of Paraguay in nearly 40 years, after defeating Domingo Laíno in the 1993 Paraguayan general election.
- May 15 – Niamh Kavanagh wins the Eurovision Song Contest for Ireland with In Your Eyes.
- May 16 – The Grand National Assembly of Turkey elects Prime Minister Süleyman Demirel as President of Turkey. After Demirel becomes president, the acting Prime Minister of Turkey is Erdal İnönü of Social Democratic Populist Party for 40 days.
- May 19 – SAM Colombia Flight 501, a Boeing 727-46, crashed during its approach to José María Córdova International Airport, Colombia, killing all 132 occupants on board.
- May 24 – Eritrea gains independence from Ethiopia.
- May 25 – The International Criminal Tribunal for the former Yugoslavia is created in The Hague.
- May 26 – Albanian President Sali Berisha urges the United States and NATO to take action to prevent Serbian ethnic cleansing of Kosovo Albanians.
- May 28 – Eritrea and Monaco gain entry to the United Nations.

=== June ===
- June 1
  - Large protests erupt against Slobodan Milošević's regime in Belgrade; opposition leader Vuk Drašković and his wife Danica are arrested.
  - President of Guatemala Jorge Serrano Elías is forced to flee the country after an attempted self-coup.
  - 1993 Burundian presidential election: The first multiparty elections in Burundi since the country's independence lead to the election of Melchior Ndadaye, leader of the Front for Democracy in Burundi. The next day's legislative election sees his party win with an overwhelming majority.
  - In an effort to minimize political chaos in post-Communist Poland, Lech Walesa signs a reform bill requiring political parties to receive at least 5% of the vote to qualify for seats in the Sejm.
- June 5
  - The National Assembly of Venezuela designates Ramón José Velásquez as successor of suspended President Carlos Andrés Pérez.
  - Attack on Pakistani military in Somalia: twenty-four Pakistani troops in the United Nations forces are killed in Mogadishu, Somalia.
- June 6
  - Following the Revolutionary Nationalist Movement's victory, Gonzalo Sánchez de Lozada becomes President of Bolivia.
  - Mongolia holds its first direct presidential elections, Punsalmaagiin Ochirbat remains president.
- June 8 – Kurdish–Turkish conflict: the PKK-declared ceasefire ends in Iraq.
- June 11 – Jurassic Park releases in cinemas in the United States.
- June 14 – Multipartyists win a referendum on the future of the one-party system in Malawi.
- June 18
  - Iraq disarmament crisis: Iraq refuses to allow UNSCOM weapons inspectors to install remote-controlled monitoring cameras at two missile engine test stands.
  - KTTV launched Good Day L.A.
- June 22 – Japan's New Party Sakigake breaks away from the Liberal Democratic Party.
- June 24 – UK mathematician Andrew Wiles wins worldwide fame after presenting his proof of Fermat's Last Theorem, a problem that had been unsolved for more than three centuries.
- June 25
  - Kim Campbell becomes the 19th, and first female, Prime Minister of Canada.
  - Tansu Çiller of True Path Party forms the new government of Turkey.
  - Zoran Lilić succeeds Dobrica Ćosić as President of Yugoslavia.
  - The litas is introduced as the new currency of Lithuania.
  - Jacques Attali resigns as President of the European Bank for Reconstruction and Development.
- June 26–28 – Typhoon Koryn causes massive damage to the Philippines, China and Macau.
- June 27 – U.S. President Bill Clinton orders a cruise missile attack on Iraqi intelligence headquarters in the Al-Mansur District of Baghdad, in response to an Iraqi plot to assassinate former U.S. President George H. W. Bush during his visit to Kuwait in mid-April.
- June 29 – The first mobile phone call was made in Greece, marking the launch of mobile telephony services in the country by Telestet (now NOVA).

=== July ===
- July 5
  - Iraq disarmament crisis: UN inspection teams leave Iraq. Iraq then agrees to UNSCOM demands and the inspection teams return.
  - Electrochemist Faiza Al-Kharafi is appointed rector (president) of Kuwait University, the first woman to head a major university in the Middle East.
- July 7–9 – The 19th G7 summit is held in Tokyo, Japan.
- July 7 – Hurricane Calvin lands in Mexico. It is the second Pacific hurricane on record to land in Mexico in July and kills 34.
- July 8 – Monsoonal floods in South Asia begin, going on to kill more than three thousand people over the next month.
- July 12 – The 7.7 M_{w} Hokkaidō earthquake affects northern Japan with a maximum Mercalli intensity of VIII (Severe) and triggers a devastating tsunami that kills 230 on the small island of Okushiri, Hokkaido.
- July 18 – 1993 Japanese general election: The loss of majority of the Liberal Democratic Party results in a coalition taking power.
- July 25 – In a terrorist attack members of the Azanian People's Liberation Army open fire on a congregation inside St James Church in Kenilworth, Cape Town, killing eleven and injuring fifty.
- July 26
  - Miguel Indurain wins the 1993 Tour de France.
  - Asiana Airlines Flight 733 crashes into Mt. Ungeo in Haenam, South Korea; 68 are killed.
- July 29 – The Israeli Supreme Court acquits accused Nazi death camp guard John Demjanjuk of all charges and he is set free.
- July 30 – A wildfire on the Greek island of Ikaria kills 13.

=== August ===
- August – The European Exchange Rate Mechanism margin was expanded to 15% to accommodate speculation against the French franc and other currencies.
- August 5 – The discovery of the Tel Dan Stele, the first archaeological confirmation of the existence of the Davidic line, announced.
- August 9 – King Albert II of Belgium is sworn into office nine days after the death of his brother, King Baudouin I.
- August 13 – More than 130 die in the collapse of Royal Plaza Hotel at Nakhon Ratchasima in Thailand's worst hotel disaster.
- August 21 – NASA loses radio contact with the Mars Observer orbiter 3 days before the spacecraft is scheduled to enter orbit around Mars.
- August 25 – Boris Yeltsin, on an official state visit to Poland, lays a wreath at the Katyn memorial.
- August 28
  - Ong Teng Cheong becomes the first President of Singapore elected by the population.
  - The first Power Rangers series, Mighty Morphin Power Rangers (an adaptation of Kyōryū Sentai Zyuranger), premieres in the United States.
- August 31 – Russia completes removing its troops from Lithuania.

=== September ===
- September 13
  - 1993 Norwegian parliamentary election: The Labour Party wins a plurality of the seats and Prime Minister Gro Harlem Brundtland retains office.
  - Oslo I Accord: Following initially secret talks from earlier in the year, PLO leader Yasser Arafat and Israeli prime minister Yitzhak Rabin shake hands in Washington, D.C. after signing a peace accord.
- September 15–21 – Hurricane Gert crosses from the Atlantic to the Pacific Ocean through Central America and Mexico.
- September 17 – The last Russian military personnel leave Poland.
- September 19 – 1993 Polish parliamentary election: A coalition of the Democratic Left Alliance and the Polish People's Party led by Waldemar Pawlak comes into power.
- September 22 – Big Bayou Canot train disaster: A bridge collapses while the Amtrak Sunset Limited is in the process of crossing it, killing 47 people.
- September 23 – The International Olympic Committee selects Sydney, Australia, to host the 2000 Summer Olympics.
- September 24 – The Cambodian monarchy is restored, with Norodom Sihanouk as king.
- September 25 – The Nipah Dam incident: Indonesian security forces shoot and kill four protesters opposing the construction of a dam.
- September 26
  - The first mission in Biosphere 2 ends after two years.
  - PoSAT-1 (the first Portuguese satellite) is launched on board French rocket Ariane 4.
- September 27 – War in Abkhazia: Fall of Sukhumi – Eduard Shevardnadze accuses Russia of passive complicity.
- September 30 – Latur earthquake: A 6.2 M_{w} earthquake occurs in the vicinity of Maharashtra, India having a maximum Mercalli intensity of VIII (Severe), killing 9,748 and injuring 30,000.

=== October ===
- October 3–4– Battle of Mogadishu: The U.S. Army conducts Operation Gothic Serpent in the city of Mogadishu, Somalia, deploying Task Force Ranger. Two U.S. Army UH-60 Blackhawks are shot down and the operation leaves over 1,000 Somalis dead and over 74 Americans wounded in action, 18 killed and 1 captured.
- October 4 – The Russian constitutional crisis culminates with Russian military and security forces, using tanks and clearing the White House of Russia Parliament building by force, quashing a mass uprising against President Boris Yeltsin.
- October 5 – China performs a nuclear test, ending a worldwide de facto moratorium.
- October 9 – The South Korean ferry Seohae capsizes off Pusan, South Korea; 292 are killed.
- October 11–28 – The UNMIH is prevented from entering Haiti by its military-led regime. On October 18, United Nations economic sanctions (abolished in August) are reinstated. U.S. President Bill Clinton sends 6 American warships to enforce them.
- October 13
  - 1993 Greek legislative election: Andreas Papandreou begins his second term as Prime Minister of Greece.
  - The fifth summit of the Francophonie opens in Mauritius.
  - The 1993 Finisterre earthquakes in Papua New Guinea kill at least 60 due to landslides.
- October 19 – Benazir Bhutto becomes the Prime Minister of Pakistan for the second time.
- October 21 – A coup in Burundi results in the death of president Melchior Ndadaye and sparks the Burundi Civil War.
- October 23 – The Toronto Blue Jays repeat as World Series champions, becoming the first team to win back-to-back titles since the 1977–1978 New York Yankees.
- October 25 – 1993 Canadian federal election: Jean Chrétien and his Liberal Party defeat the governing Progressive Conservative Party, which falls to a historic low of two seats.
- October 27–31 – The Southland Firestorm, formed of more than fourteen separate fires in Southern California burning simultaneously, burns more than 700 homes and 160,000 acres. Two of these fire are the Laguna Fire which burned more than 16,000 acres (6,500 hectares), destroyed hundreds of homes and caused $528 million in damage in Orange County, California, and the Kinneloa Fire in Los Angeles County, California which caused a fatality.

=== November ===
- November 1 – The Maastricht Treaty takes effect, formally establishing the European Union.
- November 4 – Jean Chrétien becomes the 20th Prime Minister of Canada.
- November 5 – The Parliament of the United Kingdom passes the Railways Act 1993, setting out the procedures for privatisation of British Rail.
- November 9 – Bosnian Croat forces destroy the Stari Most, or Old Bridge of Mostar, Bosnia and Herzegovina, by tank fire.
- November 12 – London Convention: Marine dumping of radioactive waste is outlawed.
- November 14 – In a status referendum, residents of Puerto Rico vote by a slim margin to maintain Commonwealth status.
- November 17–22 – The North American Free Trade Agreement (NAFTA) passes the legislative houses in the United States, Canada and Mexico.
- November 17
  - In Nigeria, General Sani Abacha ousts the government of Ernest Shonekan in a military coup.
  - The first meeting of the Asia-Pacific Economic Cooperation summit opens in Seattle.
- November 20 – An Avioimpex Yakovlev Yak-42D crashes into Mount Trojani near Ohrid, North Macedonia. All 8 crew members and 115 of the 116 passengers are killed.
- November 28 – The Observer reveals that a channel of communications has existed between the Provisional Irish Republican Army and the British government, despite the government's persistent denials.
- November 30
  - An agreement establishing the Permanent Tripartite Commission for East African Co-operation is signed.
  - U.S. President Bill Clinton signs the Brady Handgun Violence Prevention Act.

=== December ===
- December 2
  - STS-61: NASA launches the Space Shuttle Endeavour on a mission to repair an optical flaw in the Hubble Space Telescope.
  - Colombian drug lord Pablo Escobar is gunned down by police.
- December 5
  - Omar Bongo is re-elected as President of Gabon in the country's first multiparty elections.
  - Rafael Caldera Rodríguez is elected President of Venezuela for the second time, succeeding interim president Ramón José Velásquez.
- December 7
  - In Garden City, New York, six people are murdered and 19 injured in the Long Island Rail Road massacre, a racially motivated mass shooting perpetrated by Colin Ferguson, a black Jamaican immigrant.
  - The 32-member Transitional Executive Committee holds its first meeting in Cape Town, marking the first meeting of an official government body in South Africa with Black members.
  - President of Ivory Coast Félix Houphouët-Boigny dies at 88, the oldest African head of state. He is succeeded four days later by Henri Konan Bédié.
- December 8 – U.S. President Bill Clinton signs into law the North American Free Trade Agreement.
- December 10 – id Software releases the first-person shooter game Doom.
- December 11
  - One of the three blocks of the Highland Towers near Kuala Lumpur, Malaysia collapses, killing 48.
  - 1993 Chilean presidential election: Eduardo Frei Ruiz-Tagle is elected with 58% of the vote.
- December 13
  - Former Prime Minister of Canada Kim Campbell resigns as leader of the Progressive Conservative Party and is succeeded as leader by Jean Charest.
  - The Majilis of Kazakhstan approves the nuclear Non-Proliferation Treaty and agrees to dismantle the more than 100 missiles left on its territory by the fall of the USSR.
- December 15 – The Uruguay Round of General Agreement on Tariffs and Trade (GATT) talks reach a successful conclusion after seven years.
- December 17 – Brazil's Supreme Court rules that former President Fernando Collor de Mello may not hold elected office again until 2000 due to political corruption.
- December 20
  - The United Nations General Assembly votes to appoint a U.N. High Commissioner for Human Rights.
  - The first corrected images from the Hubble Space Telescope are taken.
- December 21
  - The Hungarian Parliament elects Péter Boross Prime Minister of Hungary following the death of József Antall on December 12.
  - Phil Vischer and Mike Nawrocki's VeggieTales is first released.
- December 30
  - The Congress Party gains a parliamentary majority in India after the defection of 10 Janata Dal party lawmakers.
  - Representatives of Israel and the Holy See sign the Fundamental Agreement Between the Holy See and the State of Israel, preparing for the establishment of diplomatic relations.
  - Argentina passes a measure allowing President Carlos Menem and all future presidents to run for a second consecutive term. It also shortens presidential terms to four years and removes the requirement for the president to be Roman Catholic.

== Nobel Prizes ==

- Chemistry – Kary Mullis, Michael Smith
- Economics – Robert W. Fogel, Douglass North
- Literature – Toni Morrison
- Peace – Nelson Mandela and F. W. de Klerk
- Physics – Russell Alan Hulse, Joseph Hooton Taylor, Jr.
- Physiology or Medicine – Richard J. Roberts, Phillip Allen Sharp

== Sources ==
- Trumbull, Charles P., ed. (1994). 1994 Book of the year. Encyclopædia Britannica. Chicago. ISBN 0-85229-600-2.
- Berani, Jacques, ed. (1994). Universalia 1994. Encyclopædia Universalis (in French). Paris. ISBN 2-85229-321-8.
- Harnois, Christiane (dir.) (1994). Le Livre de l'Année 1994 (in French). Montreal: Grolier. ISBN 0-7172-3019-8.
