= Orfana rail disaster =

1972 rail disaster in Greece

- Location within Greece

Details
- Date: 16 January 1972; 16:45
- Location: Orfana
- Coordinates: 39.4260°N 22.2381°E
- Country: Greece
- Line: Athens–Thessaloniki mainline
- Operator: OSE
- Owner: OSE
- Incident type: Head-on collision
- Cause: Human error (Lack of coordination between station masters)

Statistics
- Trains: 2
- Deaths: 21
- Injured: 40

The Orfana rail disaster occurred on 16 January 1972 when, at around 16:45, a breakdown in communication between the corresponding stationmasters at Doxaras and Orfana caused an express train and a military relief train to collide in bad weather on the single track line. Twenty-one people died, and more than forty were injured in one of the deadliest rail accidents in Greece. Nikolaos Gekas, the stationmaster at Orfana, was later sentenced to five years for his part in the disaster.

== Background ==
At noon, an Alco diesel engine (one of the most modern the Greek railways had at the time) was waiting for the two drivers. The train left Thessaloniki at 13:30 in the afternoon bound for Athens, while the other, a slow stopping service, Train 121 left Piraeus at 09:30 bound for Thessaloniki. The ALCO.A323 diesel train was driven by Politis and Stamatiou, and was made up of an Italian-made mail car; two auxiliary closed freight cars and two passenger cars. The southbound diesel hauled Acropolis Express service running the route Munich to Athens and northbound Train 121 Athens to Thessaloniki (known as the "posta" because it also carried the mail) which was also transporting 30 Artillery soldiers from Thebes as transfer to units in Northern Greece. The weather in Thessaly was cold, with freezing fog. Acropolis Express arrived in Larissa, where it made a short stop before continuing its course southwards. Both services where run by Hellenic Railways Organisation or OSE, the state railway company which had only come into operation one-year prior.

== Crash ==
The crash occurred between Doxaras and Orfana in the late afternoon on the main line between the stations of Orfana Kranonas and Doxara Larissa. A few minutes after the Acropolis Express left Larissa, the Paleofarsalos stationmaster give the departure order to Train 121 to proceed. This was not an issue, as the line was (at the time) single-track, but the trans would use a passing loop at either Orfanon or Doxara station. The two station masters, Nikolaos Gekas (of Orphanon) and Dimitrios Papadopoulos (of Doxara), disagreed with each other as one wanted the crossing to take place at the station of the other. The regional traffic controller Georgios Haliotis (from Athens) was asked to resolve their dispute. Both the southbound Acropolis Express and the Northbound Train 121 were thus allowed to proceed

Typically priority was given to the high-speed train from Thessaloniki, but Nikolaos Gekas ordered the Northbound train to proceed as well. It was written that the train drivers heard a fight on the radio and thus failed to reduce speed. In the meantime, the assistant driver of Train 121, having received complaints from the head of the "mail" that there was a heating problem, left his post and went to the engine room to see the steam generator. Thus, the train driver Sirmas, who was sitting on the right, had no visibility to the left, where the high-speed Express was coming from. It has also been written that both Train 121 were listening to the broadcast of the Panioni-Olympic football match on the radio that day and were probably engrossed and thus distracted. With Acropolis Express soon developing a speed of 100 km/h (62 mph) at 16:45 in the afternoon the "Acropolis Express" collided with the "post" head-on. The "Acropolis" diesel engine crushed the "post" engine, while all its first three wagons were crushed. The collision killed 21 people and injured 40. It is the third deadliest railway accidents that have happened in Greece, following the Tempi train crash (28 February 2023 - 57 dead) and Corinth rail disaster (1968 - 34 dead).

== Investigation ==
Investigation revealed that two minutes prior to the crash, a shepherd saw the fateful course of both trains from a hill above the curve in the track and tried with his cape to warn the driver of the "Acropolis", but the driver misunderstood his actions and thought he was greeting him and thus reciprocated by honking. The Investigation found the accident occurred due to a lack of understanding between the station masters of the two stations combined with the fact that the network was a single line (at the time) and there were no modern methods of intercommunication. The two stationmasters had disagreed on which of the two trains should have priority, and, despite the intervention of the train traffic controller from Athens, both the "Acropolis Express" and the "post" normally passed through the station of Doxaras and Orphanes, respectively, with the result to collide en route. The two stationmasters and the traffic controller were charged with manslaughter and disrupting traffic safety in the first degree. At the trial, which took place in November 1972 in Karditsa, they were sentenced to prison terms of three to five years. The penalties had no deterrent effect. In January 1973, at the appeals court in Larissa, Nikolaos Gekas the Orfana stationmaster, was sentenced to five years in prison, while the other two defendants were acquitted.

== Aftermath ==
In the aftermath, reports emerged of two women who boarded the Orfanon station and would get off at the next station of Doxaras (a route that did not exceed 10 kilometers). One died, and the other was seriously injured.

The junta at the time, alarmed by this second fatal crash, decided to modernize the train communications network through its vice-president Stylianos Pattakos, they announced the equipping of trains with radiotelephones.

Subsequently, with the upgrading, track doubling, and electrification of what would become the Piraeus–Platy mainline, the section where the collision took place was replaced with a more direct tunnel between Doxaras and Orfana, bypassing the blind turn completely.

== See also ==
- List of rail accidents in Greece
- List of rail accidents (1970–1979)
