= Adendro railway station =

Railway station in Adendro, Greece

Άδενδρο Adendro
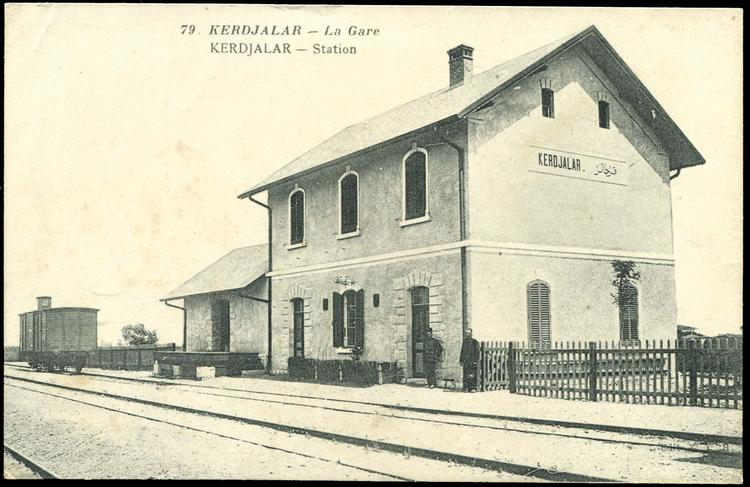
- Adendro old station building, circa 1891

General information
- Location: Adendro 570 07, Adendro; Chalkidona; Greece
- Coordinates: 40°40′28″N 22°36′10″E
- Owner: GAIAOSE
- Operator: Hellenic Train
- Lines: Piraeus–Platy railway; Thessaloniki–Bitola railway
- Platforms: 3 (1 disused)
- Tracks: 6

Construction
- Structure type: at-grade
- Platform levels: 1
- Parking: Yes

Other information
- Status: Staffed
- Website: http://www.ose.gr/en/

History
- Opened: 1894
- Rebuilt: 9 September 2007; 19 years ago
- Electrified: 25 kV AC, 50 Hz
- Former names: Kirtzilar (after 1927)

Services
Preceding station	Regional Rail	Following station
Platy towards Larissa	Line T1	Sindos towards Thessaloniki
Platy towards Florina	Line T2	Sindos towards Thessaloniki
Location
- Location within Greece

Adendro railway station (Greek: Σιδηροδρομικός σταθμός Άδενδρο, romanized: Sidirodromikós stathmós Adendro) is a railway station that serves the village of Adendro in the municipality of Chalkidona, Thessaloniki regional unit, Greece. Opened in 1894 in what was then the Ottoman Empire, it is located just north of the village centre. The station is served by Regional stopping services Florina, Kalambaka, Palaiofarsalos and Thessaloniki, and since 9 September 2007 by the Thessaloniki Regional Railway (formerly the Suburban Railway). It was the site of a serious railway accident on 13 May 2017 in which three people were killed.

== History ==
Opened in 1894 as Kirtzilar railway station (Greek: Σιδηροδρομικός σταθμός Κιρτζιλάρ, romanized: Sidirodromikós stathmós Kirtzilar) in what was then the Ottoman Empire, at the completion of the Société du Chemin de Fer ottoman Salonique-Monastir, a branchline of the Chemins de fer Orientaux from Thessaloniki to Bitola. During this period Northern Greece and the southern Balkans where still under Ottoman rule, and Adendro was known as Kirtzilar. Adendro was annexed by Greece on 18 October 1912 during the First Balkan War. On 17 October 1925 The Greek government purchased the Greek sections of the former Salonica Monastir railway and the railway became part of the Hellenic State Railways, with the remaining section north of Florina seeded to Yugoslavia. In 1927 the station along with the settlement was renamed Adendro. On 9 September 2007, the station reopened. In 1970 OSE became the legal successor to the SEK, taking over responsibilities for most of Greece's rail infrastructure.

On 1 January 1971 the station, and most of Greek rail infrastructure where transferred to the Hellenic Railways Organisation S.A., a state-owned corporation. Freight traffic declined sharply when the state-imposed monopoly of OSE for the transport of agricultural products and fertilisers ended in the early 1990s. Many small stations of the network with little passenger traffic were closed down. In 2001 the infrastructure element of OSE was created, known as GAIAOSE, it would henceforth be responsible for the maintenance, of stations, bridges and other elements of the network, as well as the leasing and the sale of railway assists. In 2003, OSE launched "Proastiakos SA", as a subsidiary to serve the operation of the suburban network in the urban complex of Athens during the 2004 Olympic Games. In 2005, TrainOSE was created as a brand within OSE to concentrate on rail services and passenger interface.

Since 9 September 2007, the station is served by the Thessaloniki Regional Railway. In 2009, with the Greek debt crisis unfolding OSE's Management was forced to reduce services across the network. Timetables were cut back and routes closed as the government-run entity attempted to reduce overheads. In 2008, all Proastiakos were transferred from OSE to TrainOSE. In 2017 OSE's passenger transport sector was privatised as TrainOSE, currently, a wholly owned subsidiary of Ferrovie dello Stato Italiane infrastructure, including stations, remained under the control of OSE. In July 2022, the station began being served by Hellenic Train, the rebranded TranOSE.

The station is owned by GAIAOSE, which since 3 October 2001 owns most railway stations in Greece: the company was also in charge of rolling stock from December 2014 until October 2025, when Greek Railways (the owner of the Thessaloniki–Bitola railway) took over that responsibility.

== Facilities ==
The station has waiting rooms and a staffed ticket office within the original 19th-century building. There is lift access to the platforms. There is a taxi rank and Parking in the forecourt.

== Services ==
As of September 2026, the following weekday train services call at this station:

- Thessaloniki Regional Railway Line T1 between Thessaloniki and Larissa, with up to eight trains per day in each direction;
- Thessaloniki Regional Railway Line T2, with three trains per day in each direction towards Thessaloniki, two towards Florina, and one towards Edessa.

The Hellenic Train Intercity service between Athens and Thessaloniki passes through but does not call at this station.

== Accidents and incidents ==
=== 2017 accident ===
On 13 May 2017, an Intercity nonstopping passenger train derailed and collided with a house in Adendro. Three people were killed and ten were injured. A preliminary report stated that the cause of the accident had been excessive speed.

== Station layout ==
Level E1
Side platform, doors open on the right
Platform 4
Not in regular use
Island platform, doors open on the left/right
Platform 2
← to Larissa / to Florina (Platy)
Through line
← services
Through line
services →
Platform 1
to Thessaloniki (Sindos) →
Side platform, doors open on the right
G
- Street level
- Concourse
- Customer service
- Tickets
- Exits

== See also ==
- Railway stations in Greece
- Hellenic Railways Organization
- Hellenic Train
- Proastiakos
- P.A.Th.E./P.
