= Tithorea 1994 derailment =

2017 railway incident in Greece

Details
- Date: 11 September 1994
- Location: Tithorea
- Country: Greece
- Line: Athens – Volos
- Operator: OSE
- Incident type: Derailment

Statistics
- Trains: 1
- Deaths: 5
- Injured: 35

An intercity passenger train derailed in Tithorea, Greece, on 11 September 1994. Five people were killed. A preliminary report stated that the cause of the accident was excessive speed.

The crash was referred to as one of Greece's most tragic rail disasters.

== Derailment ==
The Intercity 42 “Trikoupis” operating the Athens–Volos route, was forced by OSE station staff at Tithorea to divert onto a passing track due to a disabled train (No. 602) in front obstructing the main line. The train entered the approaches at 140 km/h (87 mph), far exceeding the 40 km/h (25 mph) mandated slow-speed limit and even above the main-line limit of 120 km/h (75 mph) Five people were killed, and 10 more were injured including a 4-year-old boy and a 14-year-old girl when one carriage of the train derailed at a turn, derailing the whole train. One carriage caught fire, though it did not spread.

== Investigation ==
The official report blamed the driver for ignoring a warning signal before Tithorea and not adhering to the slowdown directive; the driver stated he was informed too late about the route change, saying:

“I was entering Tithorea at 140 km/h. Fifty meters before reaching the switch, I saw the changed track. What could I do?”

It was also revealed, by Lamia journalist Giorgos Palamiotis, who investigated the issue, the accident had another explanation, that OSE had given a small bonus of around 18 drachmas to drivers for each minute saved during their journey, a possible incentive that contributed to excessive speed. Both the driver, G. Grammatikis, and the train's supervisor, A. Mitrolios, were held responsible. Grammatikis was sentenced to 59 months in jail; Mitrolios received a sentence of 33 months and 15 days.

== See also ==
- List of rail accidents in Greece
- List of rail accidents (1990–1999)
