= 1993 Ikaria forest fire =

1993 wildfire in Greece

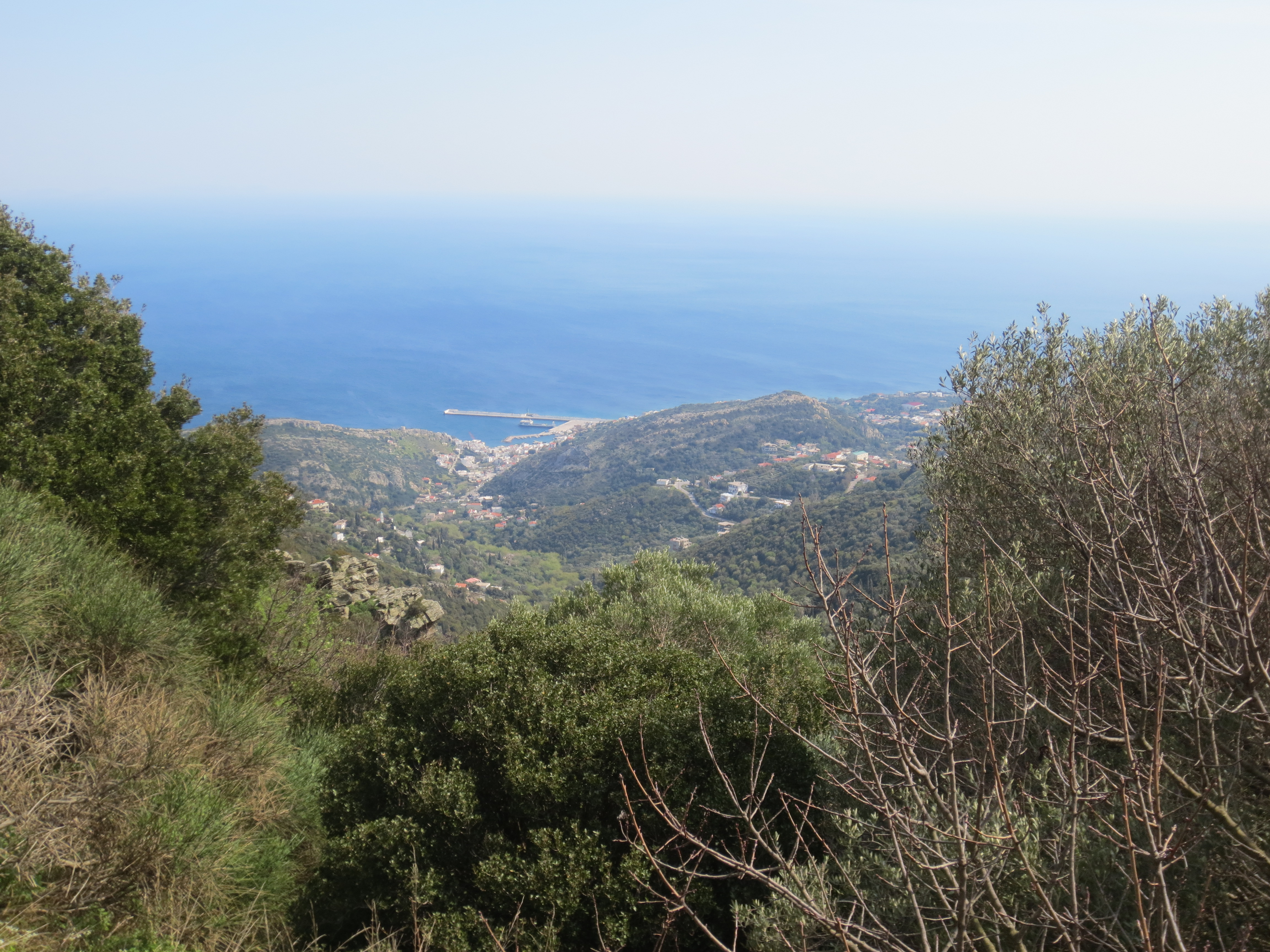
- Mountains north of Agios Kirykos, where the fires originated
- Date: 30 July, 1993
- Location: Ikaria, in the settlements of Agios Kirykos, Glaredos, Kountouma, Panagia, Chrisostomos, Xilosirtis, Therma Lefkados, Therma

Statistics
- Total fires: 2
- Burned area: ~81 km²

Impacts
- Deaths: 13
- Injuries: exact number not known
- Structures lost: 35 houses destroyed

Ignition
- Cause: Suspected arson

On the afternoon of July 30, 1993 at 2:30 PM, a large forest fire broke out on the Greek island of Ikaria, originating as two fires that quickly merged north of the town of Agios Kirykos. Due to strong winds and inadequate firefighting equipment the fire quickly spread out of control. Many people abandoned their homes in the surrounding areas to escape and fled to the city, but several remained to try to save them. The fire killed 13 people and injured many more, burning through thousands of acres of farmland and destroying 35 houses. The fires were largely attributed to arson, although no official cause was ever determined.

== Victims ==
Many of the victims were elderly, and could not escape the fast-moving fire which was exacerbated by high winds. The three younger men; Elias Fysidas, Giorgios Kirikos, and Dimitros Tsaganos all died trying to help the three elderly members of the Poulos family escape the fire. Every year on July 30, memorial gatherings are held at the site of the Poulos family home, where a monument was placed in 2000. The victims of the fire were:

- Efstratios Poulos - 80
- Koula Poulos - 73
- Stamatoula Poulos - 67
- Giorgios Kirikos - 39
- Elias Fysidas - 25
- Dimitrios Tsaganos - 21
- Konstantinos Bratsis - 68
- Georgios Peskesis - 73
- Ekaterini Peskesi - 64
- Sideris Liaris - 69
- Kalliopi Liari - 70
- Georgia Xyla - 18
- Despina Xyla - 65

== See also ==
- List of disasters in Greece by death toll
- 2023 Greece wildfires
