= Acropolis Express =

Defunct international rail line

The Acropolis Express was a long-distance international train that operated between Munich and Athens, named after the ancient citadel in Athens. It was a collaborative effort involving the Deutsche Bundesbahn, the Austrian Federal Railways (ÖBB), the Yugoslav Railways (JŽ), and the Hellenic Railways (OSE). The route spanned from Munich, passing through Villach, Ljubljana, Zagreb, Belgrade, Pristina, Skopje, Thessaloniki, and reaching Athens. Designated as a D-train in Germany with the train numbers D 290/291, it held the classification of an Express (Ex) in Austria and Yugoslavia.

== History ==
Introduced in 1967 as a complement to existing Balkan train services, the Acropolis-Express aimed to cater to German tourists, distinguishing itself from the primarily worker-focused Hellas Express, which had been running from Dortmund to Athens since 1963. The Greek State Railways advocated for the Deutsche Bundesbahn to provide the train cars.

Initially featuring both open sitting railcars and sleeping cars from DSG and a sleeping car from CIWL, the Acropolis underwent changes over the years. The sleeping car was discontinued in 1972, and additional sleeping cars from JŽ, operating only until Yugoslavia, were introduced in the winter timetable of 1978/79. The majority of the train's sitting cars were supplied by DB and JŽ, with only DB cars continuing to Greece. In the 1980s, OSE also contributed some of the carriages.

The Acropolis, following the Hellas Express and Istanbul Express, was among the longest-distance train services originating from West Germany. However, with the onset of the Yugoslav Wars in 1991, the service was discontinued.

== See also ==
- EuroCity
- EuroCity-Express
- Orfana rail disaster
