= Sindos railway station =

Railway station in Delta, Thessaloniki, Greece

Σίνδος Sindos

General information
- Location: Delta 574 00; Thessaloniki; Greece
- Coordinates: 40°40′27″N 22°48′20″E
- Owner: GAIAOSE
- Operator: Hellenic Train
- Lines: Piraeus–Platy railway; Thessaloniki–Bitola railway
- Platforms: 2 (1 disused)
- Tracks: 5

Construction
- Structure type: at-grade
- Platform levels: 1
- Parking: Yes

Other information
- Status: Unstaffed
- Website: Official website

History
- Opened: 1894
- Rebuilt: 9 September 2007; 19 years ago
- Electrified: 25 kV AC, 50 Hz

Services
Preceding station	Regional Rail	Following station
Adendro towards Larissa	Line T1	Thessaloniki Terminus
Adendro towards Florina	Line T2	Thessaloniki Terminus
Location
- Location within Greece

Sindos railway station (Greek: Σιδηροδρομικός σταθμός Σίνδος, romanized: Sidirodromikós stathmós Sindos) is a railway station that serves the suburb of Sindos in the municipality of Delta, Thessaloniki regional unit, Greece. Opened on 9 September 2007, along with the suburban railway. The station is served by Regional stopping services Florina, Kalambaka, Palaiofarsalos and Thessaloniki, and since 9 September 2007 by the Thessaloniki Regional Railway (formerly the Suburban Railway). In the future, the station will join the Thessaloniki Metro through an extension from NSSTH and Kordelio. The old station building will house the museum of the Balkan Games.

== History ==
Opened in 1894 in what was then the Ottoman Empire, by the Société du Chemin de Fer ottoman Salonique-Monastir, a branchline of the Chemins de fer Orientaux from Thessaloniki to Bitola. During this period Northern Greece and the southern Balkans were still under Ottoman rule. Sindos was annexed by Greece on 18 October 1912 during the First Balkan War, becoming last headquarters of the Greek General Headquarters during conflict. On 17 October 1925, The Greek government purchased the Greek sections of the former Salonica Monastir railway and the railway became part of the Hellenic State Railways, with the remaining section north of Florina seeded to Yugoslavia.

In 1970 OSE became the legal successor to the SEK, taking over responsibilities for most of Greece's rail infrastructure. On 1 January 1971 the station and most of Greek rail infrastructure where transferred to the Hellenic Railways Organisation S.A., a state-owned corporation. Freight traffic declined sharply when the state-imposed monopoly of OSE for the transport of agricultural products and fertilisers ended in the early 1990s. Many small stations of the network with little passenger traffic were closed down. In 2001 the infrastructure element of OSE was created, known as GAIAOSE, it would henceforth be responsible for the maintenance of stations, bridges and other elements of the network, as well as the leasing and the sale of railway assists. In 2003, OSE launched "Proastiakos SA", as a subsidiary to serve the operation of the suburban network in the urban complex of Athens during the 2004 Olympic Games. In 2005, TrainOSE was created as a brand within OSE to concentrate on rail services and passenger interface.

On 9 September 2007, the station reopened for the Thessaloniki Regional Railway. In 2009, with the Greek debt crisis unfolding OSE's Management was forced to reduce services across the network. Timetables were cut back, and routes closed as the government-run entity attempted to reduce overheads. In 2008, all Proastiakos were transferred from OSE to TrainOSE. The following year, in 2017 OSE's passenger transport sector was privatised as TrainOSE, currently a wholly owned subsidiary of Ferrovie dello Stato Italiane infrastructure, including stations, remained under the control of OSE. By 2013 the stations buildings were in a poor state of disrepair Plans to create a Balkan Wars museum by the then municipal authority did not materialize, as the building (owned by GAIOSE) had leased the buildings for 15 years.

In February 2025, a 33-year-old railway worker was severely injured after attempting to board a moving train at a unguarded level crossing near the third entrance of the Sindos Industrial Area. The railway switchman reportedly tried to climb onto the train but lost his grip, causing him to be hit by a carriage and suffer serious injuries to his lower leg.

In November 2025, safety concerns were again raised when a service from Thessaloniki to Larissa was routed to the wrong line, with the driver engaging the brakes immediately, without having been alerted by the stationmaster at Sindos station. The stationmaster then informed the driver that there was a technical fault in the track switches and instructed him to reverse and re-enter the station so that passengers could safely disembark.

== Facilities ==
The station is still housed in the original 19th-century brick-built station building. As of (2023) the station is unstaffed, with no staffed booking office. However, there are waiting rooms. Access to the platforms is via a subway under the lines, with wheelchair accessible by elevator. The platforms have shelters with seating. However, there are no Dot-matrix display departure and arrival screens or timetable poster boards on the platforms. The station, however, has a buffet called POYΦ. There is also a taxi rank and Parking in the forecourt, and infrequent buses do call at the station.

== Services ==
As of September 2026, the following weekday train services call at this station:

- Thessaloniki Regional Railway Line T1 between Thessaloniki and Larissa, with up to eight trains per day in each direction;
- Thessaloniki Regional Railway Line T2, with three trains per day in each direction towards Thessaloniki, two towards Florina, and one towards Edessa.

There is also an unnumbered shuttle that operates between Thessaloniki and Sindos, for students of the International Hellenic University: it operates on weekdays only (except academic and public holidays), with six trains per day in each direction. The station is also served by local buses, with all services accessible from the forecourt.

The Hellenic Train Intercity service between Athens and Thessaloniki passes through but does not call at this station.

== Station layout ==
Level E1
Platform 3
Not in regular use
Island platform, doors open on the left/right
Platform 2
← to Larissa / to Florina (Adendro)
Through line
← services
Through line
services →
Platform 1
to Thessaloniki (Terminus) →
Side platform, doors open on the right
G
- Street level
- Concourse
- Customer service
- Tickets
- Exits
