= 1987 Athens heat wave =

Weather event in Greece

Meteorological history
- Duration: July 20–31, 1987
- Heat event
- Max temp: 43.6 °C (110.5 °F)

Overall effects
- Fatalities: 1,300-1,500
- Areas affected: Athens, Attica, Greece

The 1987 Athens heat wave was an extreme heat wave that primarily affected Greece, concentrated in Athens and Attica. The event lasted from July 20–31, 1987, resulted in the death of approximately 1,300–1,500 people and prompted the Greek government to declare a state of emergency. In Athens, the maximum recorded temperature was measured at 41.9 °C (107.4 °F) on July 23. The heat wave was driven by the combination of Athenian geography, atmospheric conditions, and elevated pollutant levels. Socially, the lack of air conditioning and public warning systems contributed to the high mortality rate. The 1987 Athens heat wave is regarded as a milestone in Greek public health policy, and a turning point for how extreme heat events are approached in Greece.

== Meteorological causes ==
Several environmental factors contributed to the heat wave including the direction of air flow, humidity, and wind speed. Firstly, the jet stream was positioned unusually far south, drawing hotter air from North Africa across the Mediterranean Sea into Greece. The humidity, coupled with the low wind speed on the ground resulted in the extreme temperatures. The highest recorded temperature during the event was measured in Nea Filadelfeia, where the temperatures peaked at 43.6 °C (110.5 °F) on July 27.

Athens is located in a basin, surrounded by four mountain ranges: Mount Aigaleo to the west, Mount Parnitha to the north, Mount Pentelicus to the northeast, and Mount Hymettus to the east. The four mountains contributed to trapping the hot air in the basin, resulting in the stagnant winds, accumulated heat, and 60% humidity. There are also four hills within the basin, which also contributed to the wind disruption within the Athens basin.

Piraeus is also about 8 kilometers (4.97 miles) away from central Athens. Of the approximately 1,300 related deaths, about 1,115 were located in Attica. The mortality rate in Piraeus was roughly seven times lower. This disparity can be attributed to their geographical locations. Piraeus is located on a peninsula, which allows for consistent sea breeze, whereas Athens is enclosed in mountainous terrain, limiting air circulation.

=== Air quality and pollution ===
The elevated heat and humidity accelerated chemical reactions and pollutant levels in the atmosphere. These conditions rapidly increased the production of sulfur dioxide (SO_{2}) and ozone (O_{3}), which were already being carried over as industrial emissions from the Piraeus area by western-flowing winds. The population faced extreme heat and was exposed to these pollutants, which also contributed to the mortality rate. Katsouyanni et al. (1993) found that the impacts of pollution rates and temperature on death tolls were positively correlated. The smoke, temperatures, and death tolls in Athens were elevated on the same days. The same study found that there is a statistically significant relationship between high pollution and temperatures exceeding 30° C. When the temperatures exceeded 30°C, the daily deaths also increased by more than 40 per day.

== Air conditioning and infrastructure ==
In Athens 1987, air conditioning units were scarce. While they were primarily found in hospitals and hotels, not all medical facilities were equipped with them, leaving much of the population without cooling. Most residential buildings had temperatures that were two or three degrees higher than the outdoor temperatures. Even beyond Athens, many Europeans did not support the use of air conditioning, as they were often perceived as unnecessary and unhealthy.

Because of the lack of units in residential spaces, there was an overwhelming surge in heat related patients in hospitals. This surge strained both the facility itself and the medical staff. Furthermore, the increase in deaths caused morgues and cemeteries to be overwhelmed with victims, with bodies being stored in the hospital hallways due to insufficient capacity. The Interior Ministry of Greece also ordered cemeteries to conduct burials throughout the weekend to cope for the increased demand.

Most victims in Athens lived in tightly packed, high-rise apartment blocks made of concrete. Because concrete has a high thermal mass, the heat was stored in the concrete buildings and released at night, passively heating the air and restricting the cooling of the buildings at night. Athens also had little open space and parkland. These factors trapped even more heat in the residences.

== Public health ==
The population most at risk were elderly individuals aged 75+ with pre-existing heart and respiratory conditions. According to hospital officials, over 1,500 patients were admitted with heart related problems as a result of the heat wave.

In 1987, there was no means of mass public communication. As a result, the Greek people proceeded with their daily routines. Outdoor workers continued their jobs and housewives went shopping between 11am-2pm, the peak heat hours during the day. Unaware of the danger the heat posed, the residents suffered prolonged heat exposure which increased their risk of heat related illness and death.

== Response and legacy ==
The 1987 heat wave started a series of significant changes in both public behavior and Greek government policy. On July 27, 1987, a state of national emergency was declared. As the death toll rose, an estimated one million residents fled Athens for the countryside. The Greek government implemented outdoor work restrictions on blue collar workers, largely construction workers and farmers, from 11am–4pm. Many households installed sun shading and air conditioning provisions shortly after. Furthermore, the Greek government developed public health warning systems and emergency protocols for extreme heat events.

The widespread adoption of air conditioning units was complicated by the adoption of the Montreal Protocol on September 16, 1987. The Montreal Protocol phased out the production and consumption of ozone-depleting substances (ODSs), including chlorofluorocarbons (CFCs), which were commonly used as refrigerants in air conditioning systems.

Along with the Montreal Protocol, Greek authorities implemented other pollution prevention measures between 1990 and 1994, including the replacement of older vehicles. Newer car models were equipped with catalytic converters and the sulfur content in diesel oil was reduced. These changes resulted in a 52% decrease in SO_{2} levels and a 34% decrease in carbon monoxide (CO) levels in central Athens by the mid 1990s. The measures implemented following the 1987 heat wave contributed to significantly lower mortality rates in subsequent heat events in Athens.
