= Therma, Ikaria =

Spa town in Greece

Coordinates: 37.624°N 26.305°E

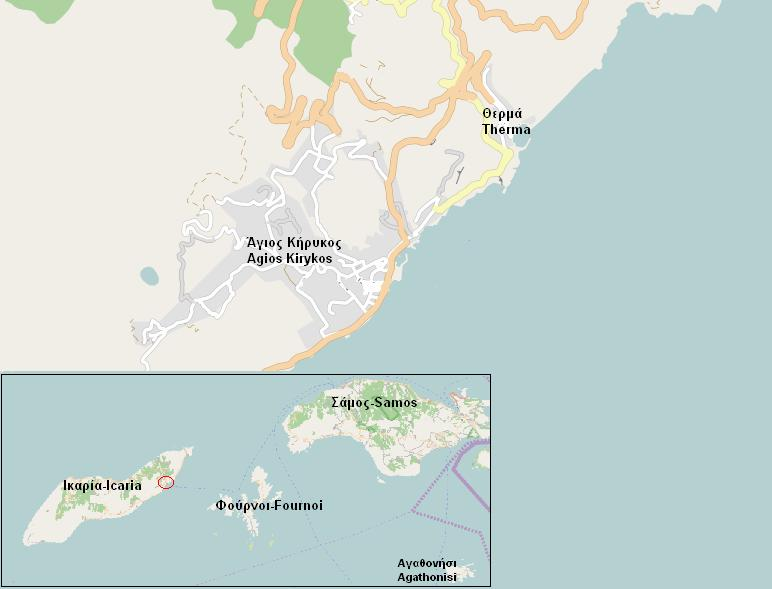
Therma on the map.

Therma (Greek: Θέρμα) is a spa town on the island of Icaria in Greece.

According to a study conducted by the University of Thessaloniki, the saline hot mineral springs of Icaria contain the largest concentration of radon in Greece, being also among the most radioactive springs in the world.

The three springs currently in operation in the spa town of Therma (located 3 km East of Agios Kirykos port and 12 km from the island's airport) have a water temperature ranging between 45 and 52.8 degrees Celsius (113–127 Fahrenheit). The radioactivity of the water covers a spectrum from 65 to 557 Mache units.

The hot springs are available to visitors from May to November.
