= Derveni railway station =

Former railway station in Corinth, Greece

Coordinates: 38.0755°N 22.2523°E

Δερβένι Derveni

General information
- Location: Derveni; Corinthia; Greece
- Owner: GAIAOSE
- Line: Piraeus–Patras railway
- Train operators: TrainOSE

Construction
- Structure type: at-grade

Other information
- Website: http://www.ose.gr/en/

History
- Opened: July 1884
- Closed: 9 July 2007
Location
- Location within Greece

The former Derveni railway station (Greek: Σιδηροδρομικός Σταθμός Δερβένι, Sidirodromikos Stathmos Derveni) was on the former metre gauge Piraeus, Athens and Peloponnese Railways (Piraeus–Patras railway).

== History ==
The Piraeus, Athens and Peloponnese Railways reached Derveni in July 1884. The main building, designed by architect Anthony Dragoymi (Greek: Αντώνη Δραγούμη) was inaugurated in 1885. Derveni station, like many similar station buildings, has the typical architectural and structural features of stone buildings with wooden ceilings and a brick roof. You will notice the jamb on all four corners, the framing of doors and windows (usually red bricks), the false ceiling with roof slats and goat hair for lime plaster, the big trusses, the arched windows, the big wooden panelled doors and the decorative fascias. 30 September 1968 34 people were killed and 125 injured at the station when a fast express train collided with a stationary stopping train in the worst railway tragedy in Greece (at the time). The station closed to regular traffic on 9 July 2007, having been originally planned to be replaced with a station on the new Athens Airport–Patras line, but this was never carried out. The old station continued to be used by tourist excursion trains, There is an intention of the Peloponnese region for a means of fixed orbit from Corinth to Derveni. From 22 June 2020, the area of Derveni to Aegio and Athens will be covered by Lygia Corinthia railway station.

The station building remains the property of GAIAOSE and is included in the list of old railway stations designated as “art work” protected by the state.
