= 1993 India floods =

Natural disaster in India

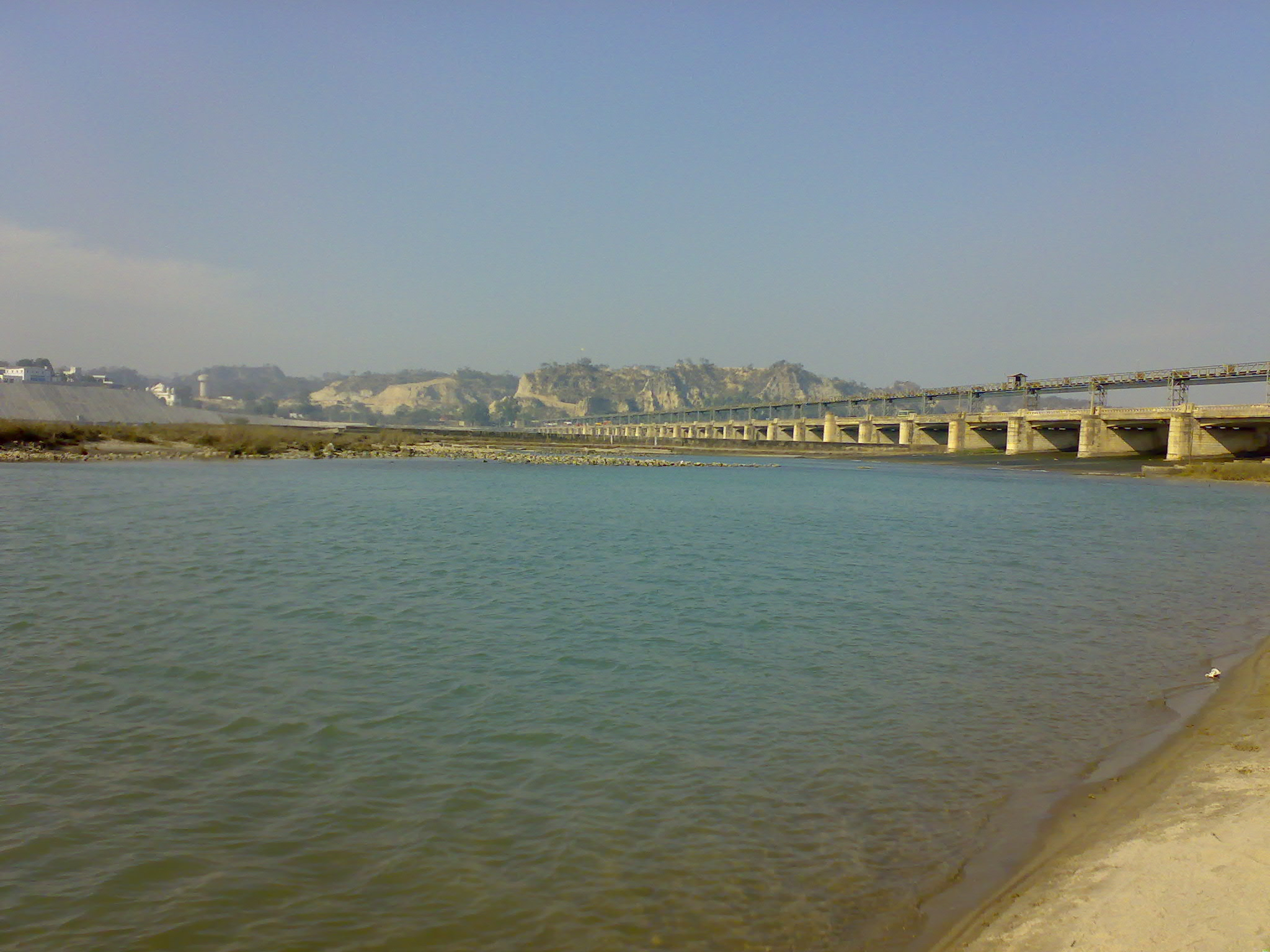
- a view of River Sutlej in Rupnagar, Punjab, India
- Date: July 1993
- Location: Punjab Assam Bihar West Bengal Haryana Jammu and Kashmir Himachal Pradesh Gujarat
- Cause: Heavy rain Landslide; Severe weather
- Deaths: 530–550
- Property damage: unknown

The 1993 India floods was a deadly flood caused by several days long heavy monsoon rains and severe weather that occurred in July 1993 across eight states in the north of the country. Severe floods left 530 fatalities and millions people went homeless, including from Haryana. Punjab with 350 deaths was the most affected state where "1.2 million acres of crops" were extensively damaged, mostly from Patiala, north-western region of the state. Flash floods swept away major railway tracks, roads, and bridges, leading to disrupt the communications between the northeastern states and the rest of the country. Initial reports cited one hundred deaths in Gujarat.

States and union territories of India

It is believed floods swept away more than one hundred cattle from the affected areas. Ajnala town of Amritsar district in Punjab also suffered a heavy loss where floods washed away a large number of the villages.

== Background ==
a map showing the areas prone to floods in India

Heavy floods caused by monsoon rains during the months of June and July leaves several fatalities with millions of worth property damage. However, rainwater is recognized one of the main sources of irrigation in the country as it provides water to agricultural crops like other countries.

On 7 July 1993, heavy monsoon caused flash floods and landslides, leading to extensive damage to human lives, crops, livestock, and housing across the seven to eight states in India such as West Bengal, Punjab, Haryana, Bihar, Assam, Himachal Pradesh, and Gujarat. It also disrupted the communications and affected 10 million people alone in Punjab state. The floods originated from the Ravi, Beas, Satluj, Ghaghhar, Yamuna, Jhelum, Brahmaputra, Sabarmati, Subarnarekha, Kharkai, and other major rivers that brought devastating floods across the states and subsequently submerged thousands of villages.

== Emergency response ==
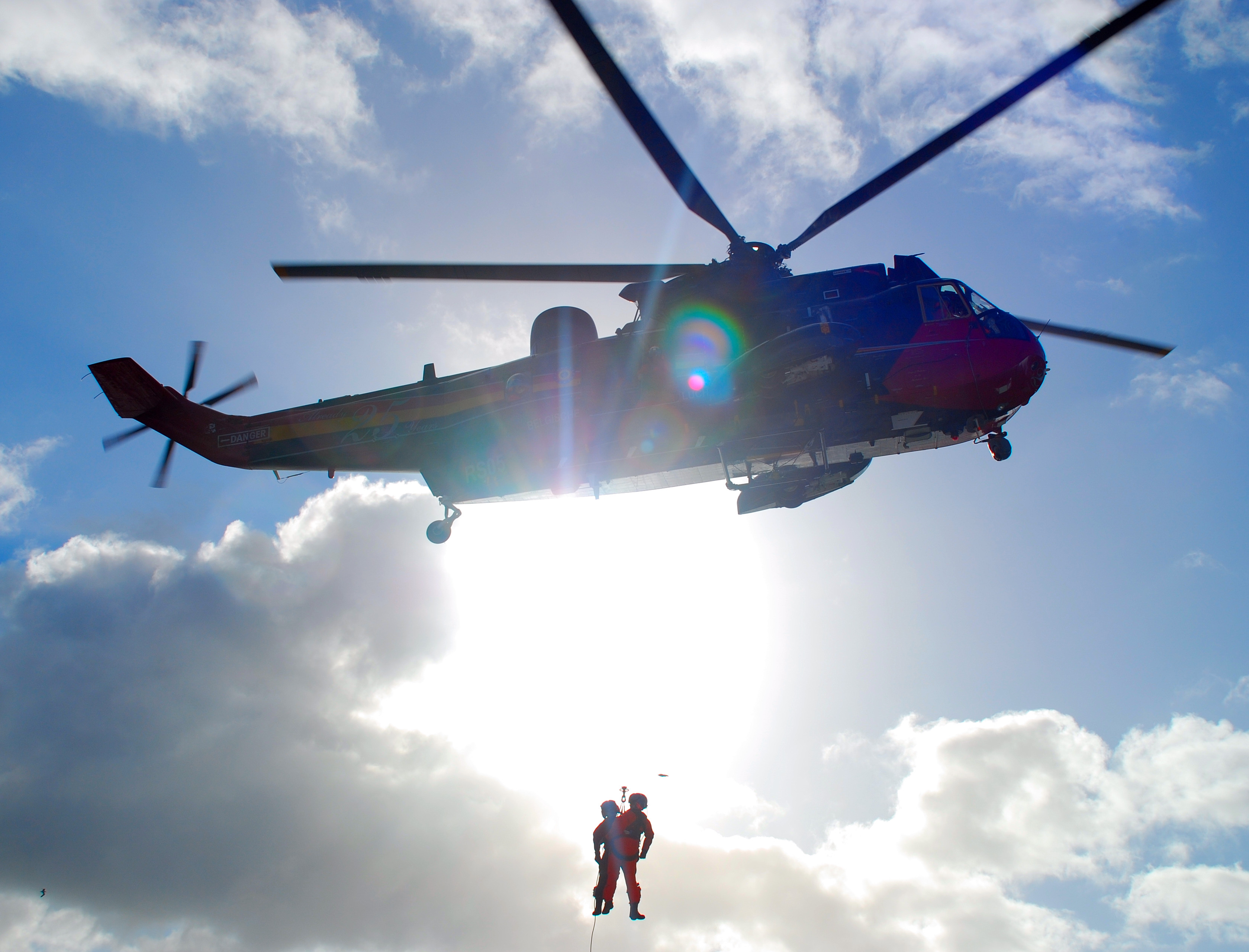
helicopter rescue

The state governments as well as union government mobilised more than 5,000 army personnel in rescue operations to combat the disaster by evacuating people from 1,500 affected villages. Army along with police and NGOs were actively involved in relief dispatch, technical rescue as well as in emergency medical services. Government also mobilised air force in an effort to airdrop food, medicine and blankets to the flood victims.

== Aftermath ==
Extreme volume of water in several rivers caused floods killing more than 530 people and damaged crops, including rice, maize and other plant species across the states. Bihar state also suffered a heavy loss where floods evacuated thousands of people, including 2.35 million people from Assam state while 250 villages came under floods and 1.6 million people went homeless. The state's three trains with 250 passengers also came under floods who were subsequently rescued by the multiple military units. Punjab's 247,000 acres of crops were extensively damaged. In Patiala district, 125,000 people were sheltered in 200 relief camps. Most of its colonies were extensively affected with 10 to 15 feet of water, while 4,000 villages of Punjab sank in flash floods. Initial reports cited 500,000 hectares of agricultural land damage along with crops property worth ₹600 crore (60 million) in Punjab state. West Bengal also suffered a heavy loss where 1 million people went homeless. The southern and southeastern portion of the Kashmir region Jammu and Kashmir suffered twenty fatalities.
