= Adendro train derailment =

2017 railway incident in Greece

2017 Adendro train derailment
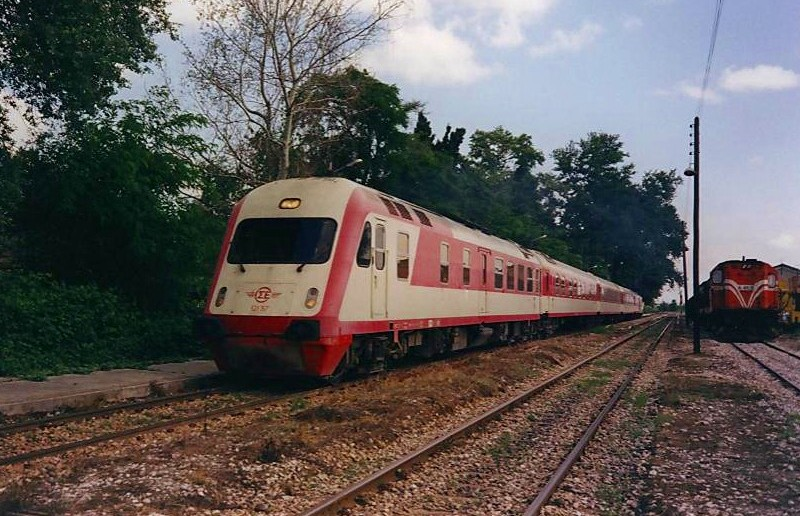
- A diesel multiple unit similar to the one involved in the accident.

Details
- Date: 13 May 2017; 21:45
- Location: Adendro
- Country: Greece
- Line: Athens – Thessaloniki
- Operator: TrainOSE
- Incident type: Derailment
- Cause: Excessive speed

Statistics
- Trains: 1
- Passengers: 73
- Crew: 5
- Deaths: 3
- Injured: 10

An intercity passenger train derailed and collided with a house in Adendro, Greece, on 13 May 2017. Three people were killed, and ten were injured. A preliminary report stated that the cause of the accident was excessive speed.

== Derailment ==
The intercity train derailed and collided with a house in Adendro, a village in the municipality of Chalkidona, Thessaloniki region, Greece. Three people were killed, and 10 more were injured when five carriages of the train derailed. The engine and one carriage collided with a house alongside the track. Two residents of the house jumped from a balcony before the collision occurred. The house was severely damaged.

The derailed train was a Class 520 diesel multiple unit. It was operating TrainOSE service IC 58 from Athens to Thessaloniki, carrying five crew and 73 passengers. The derailment occurred at 21:45 local time (18:45 UTC) at a site 200 metres (660 ft) from Adendro railway station. The train departed from Athens at 16:18. There were four people fatally injured in the accident. Those killed were two train crew, including the driver and a passenger. Following the accident, the line through Adendro was expected to remain closed until 27 May.

== Investigation ==
TrainOSE opened an investigation into the accident. The Greek Transport Ministry also opened an investigation. According to preliminary findings, the train event recorder revealed that excessive speed was the cause of the derailment. The train was travelling at 144.3 kilometres per hour (89.7 mph) where the speed limit was 60 kilometres per hour (37 mph). The three-member Commission of Experts that made the finding stated that there was no evidence of sabotage and that the local track controllers had followed proper procedures.

== See also ==
- List of rail accidents in Greece
- List of rail accidents (2010–2019)
