= Adendro =

Adendro Άδενδρο
- Community
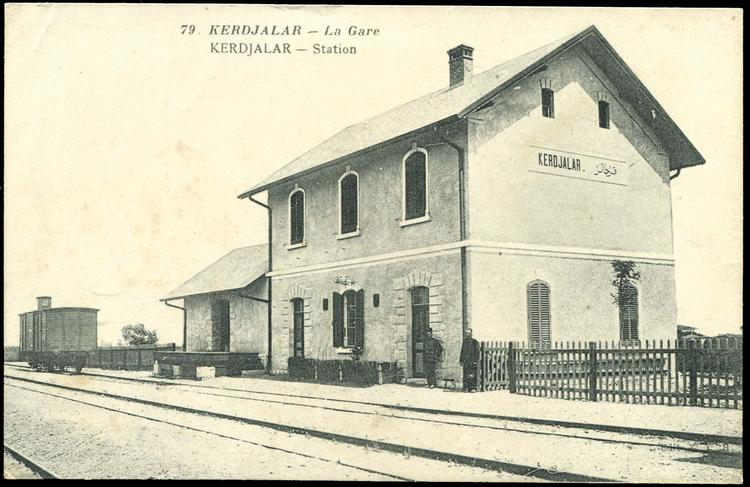
- Adendro old station building, circa 1891

- Location within Greece
- Coordinates: 40°40′N 22°36′E
- Country: Greece
- Administrative region: Central Macedonia
- Regional unit: Thessaloniki
- Municipality: Chalkidona
- Municipal unit: Chalkidona

Population (2021)
  - Community: 1,889
- Time zone: UTC+2 (EET)
  - Summer (DST): UTC+3 (EEST)

Adendro (Greek: Άδενδρο, before 1927: Κιρτζιλάρ, Kirtzilar) is a village in the municipality of Chalkidona, Thessaloniki regional unit, Greece.

== History ==
It was the site of a serious railway accident on 13 May 2017 in which three people were killed.

== Transport ==
The village is served by Adendro station, with stopping services to Palaiofarsalos, Thessaloniki and Florina, Florina and since 9 September 2007 by Proastiakos Thessaloniki services to Katerini and Larissa, Edessa, and Thessaloniki.
