= Chrissi Avgi =

Japanese-built Greek ferry

History

Greece
- Name: Chrissi Avgi
- Owner: Avgoustos Polemis
- Operator: Grammi Ipirou, Ltd.
- Route: Attica-Cyclades
- Ordered: 1970
- Fate: Sank 23 February 1983

General characteristics
- Class & type: Roll-on/Roll-off
- Tonnage: 499 (gross)
- Length: 59.4m
- Beam: 11m
- Installed power: 2 x AKASAKA diesel engines, 2 x 2700 ΒΗΡ
- Propulsion: 2 propellers
- Crew: 21

The transport ship Chrissi Avgi (Greek: Χρυσή Αυγή) was a Japanese-built Greek ferry that sank on 23 February 1983, in the neighborhood of Cape Caphereus.

The ship was built in 1970 as the Hayabusa for Kyoei Unyu K.K of Japan by Yoshiura Zosen, and was later sold to Grami Ipirou, Ltd. in Greece.

On 23 February 1983, the Chrissi Avgi left the harbour of Rafina in inclement weather with an itinerary for the islands of Andros, Paros and Naxos, carrying nine heavy tankers hauling bunker fuel and four cargo trucks under the command of Captain Dimitrios Gardelis. The ship's owner, Avgoustos Polemis, who also owned the Chryssi Ammos and Ipiros, was also aboard. At 18:30 hours, 2 nautical miles from the islet of Mandili and with winds blowing 8 on the Beaufort scale, the ship abruptly took to listing due to the shifting of the tankers in the garage, which led to a series of fires in the tankers. There was sufficient time for the passengers to escape the flames by dropping down into the water, and few suffocated.

A fracture was created by the explosions that had occurred, which caused the sinking of the ship three hours later. The distress signal which the ship sent was answered by the Chrissi Ammos, the Russian Saby Rabat, and the Romanian Boldein as well as the Kastriani Keas. A little later a signal regarding the accident was picked up by two warships of the Hellenic Navy. Out of 42 total aboard, only 14 were saved.

The majority of the passengers were truck drivers but there were also a Mrs. Matoula Lavda, a wife of one of the truck drivers, and their two children on board. Half of the total persons on board were part of the ship's crew. Three crew members and eleven passengers survived. One surviving crew member from the engine room said that communication with the bridge was lost early on in the accident. Life jackets were handed out to passengers and crew on the rear deck by a sailor, Polikarpos Xorefitis, and the steward, Mr. Spiridakis, but the lifeboats and ropes were stuck to the paint on the deck and could not be moved. Eventually, explosions forced the passengers and crew to jump or fall into the icy water below. Of the fourteen survivors, eleven were rescued by the Russian ship Saby Rabat. A twelfth person had been rescued, but he died on the Rabat's deck. Captain Avgoustos Polemis later died at a hospital ashore.

On 11 June 2016 the Antonis Grafas diving team located the wreck of the Chrissi Avgi at a spot first suggested by Giannis Mitilineos, at a depth of 112 metres. Video footage of the wreck was shot by Antonis Grafis, with a supporting dive team of John Liardakis, Anna Barbopoulou, and Athanasios Panopoulos.

== Bibliography ==
- "Τα ναυάγια που συγκλόνισαν την Ελλάδα" [The Shipwrecks that Overwhelmed Greece] (in Greek). Archived from the original on 2012-08-31.
