= Corinth rail disaster =

1968 rail disaster in Greece

- Location within Greece

Details
- Date: 30 September 1968; 18.50
- Location: Derveni railway station, Derveni, Xylokastro-Evrostina, Corinthia, Peloponnese
- Coordinates: 38°07′55″N 22°25′23″E
- Country: Greece
- Line: Piraeus–Patras railway
- Operator: SEK
- Incident type: Head-on collision
- Cause: Human error

Statistics
- Passengers: 2,500 passengers
- Deaths: 34
- Injured: 125–150

The Corinth rail disaster occurred on 30 September 1968 when two passenger trains carrying people returning to Athens after voting in their home towns in the constitutional referendum of 1968, which had been held the previous day, collided near Derveni, Corinth, killing 34 people and injuring 150. It was the worst railway disaster the country had experienced up to that time.

== Background ==
The military junta, presided over by Colonel Georgios Papadopoulos had organized a mock referendum for the approval of a new Constitution and all of Greece had gone to the polls.

On the afternoon of Monday 30 September two passenger trains one and a half hours apart left Kyparissia in Messinia bound for Athens and Piraeus. In the carriages of both train there were almost 2,500 passengers citizens, returning from voting in the referendum on the Constitution of Greece, which had been carried out by the Junta. The two trains had started their journey an hour and a half apart, the first being Regional express (stopping at all stations) while the second an Intercity service (stopping only at major stations). At 15.15 the first train, 304, left Patras. The second train, 306, started from Patras at 16.24, as an express services (stopping only at major stations) the distance between both services decreased quickly on the signal track line.

== Collision ==
Train "304" after parking at the station of Derveni and picking up passengers, continued its route, but stopped a few meters below. It was then said that someone had pulled the emergency lever. Even today it is not known why it happened and who did it.

The train crew after stopping came down to see what had happened while one of them placed a warning signal at the back of the train so that the train driver of the following train would be informed in time.

The second train, the "High Speed", which made stops only at central stations, passed Derveni station without stopping. The "Peloponnisos" newspaper wrote (at the time) the railway employees had caught the conversation and one train, 306, was moving at a speed of more than 50 kilometers. No one saw the warning sign that had been posted. By the time the drivers of 306 noticed the stalled train number 304, it was too late. They tried to stop the train but failed. At 18.50 Engine 306 collided into the last car of Train 304, which was reduced to a shapeless mass of metal, while three more cars were derailed. Passengers who had survived, but let injured screamed for help.

The nearby Village of Derveni was made aware of the collision by the big "bang". with residents rushing to the scene to see what had happened.

== Aftermath ==
Immediately after, soldiers from the School of Engineering in Loutraki, police officers and nurses arrived at the scene. The tragic toll of the accident was 34 dead and more than 150 injured. According to a publication of the time in the "Peloponnisos" newspaper, the handling of the high-speed train was undertaken by a train driver who had boarded in Patras and was licensed that day. The same publication had revealed that the four train drivers had caught up in a conversation while the train was moving and this resulted in them not seeing the warning signal for the stationary train in time.

In the weeks following the crash press speculation over why the Emergency brake was pulled, and by whom. A sailor fainted and a panicked woman pulled the distress signal. An elderly woman fainted and a passenger pulled the emergency handle. A pregnant woman fainted due to overcrowding and a sailor caused the train to stop.

== See also ==
- List of rail accidents
- List of rail accidents by country

== Sources ==
- Semmens, Peter (1994). Railway Disasters of the World: Principal Passenger Train Accidents of the 20th Century. Patrick Stephens Ltd. ISBN 1-85260-323-2.
