= Orfana railway station =

Railway station in Thessaly, Greece

Orfana Ορφανά

General information
- Location: Orfana; Karditsa; Greece
- Coordinates: 39°24′12″N 22°13′41″E
- Owner: GAIAOSE
- Operator: Hellenic Train
- Line: Piraeus–Platy railway
- Platforms: 2
- Tracks: 2

Construction
- Structure type: at-grade
- Platform levels: 1

Other information
- Website: http://www.ose.gr/en/

History
- Opened: 1995
- Electrified: 25 kV AC, 50 Hz
Former services
Preceding station	Hellenic Train	Following station
Palaiofarsalos Terminus	Regional Larissa–Palaiofarsalos	Larissa Terminus
Location
- Location within Greece

Orfana railway station (Greek: Σιδηροδρομικός Σταθμός Ορφανών, romanized: Sidirodromikos stathmos Orfanon) is a railway station in Orfana, Karditsa, Thessaly, Greece. It is located just east of the village. Opened in 1995, replacing an older station of the same name.

== History ==
On 16 January 1972, at around 1645 hours on the line between Orfana and Doxara, a breakdown in communication between the corresponding stationmasters at Doxaras and Orfana caused an express train and a military relief train to collide in bad weather on the single track line. The southbound diesel hauled Acropolis Express and northbound Number 121 Athens-Thessaloniki, (known as posta) were allowed to proceed without first allowing a passing loop. 21 people died, and more than 40 were injured in one of the deadliest rail accidents in Greece. Nikolaos Gekas The stationmaster at Orfana was later sentenced to 5 years for his part in the disaster.

== Facilities ==
The station is an unstaffed halt, with few facilities, aside from two small shelters with seating. There is no cafe or shop on-site. At platform level, there are sheltered seating but no Dot-matrix display departure, arrival screens or public address (PA) systems; however, timetable poster boards on both platforms are available.

== Services ==
The station is served the following Hellenic Train services:

- Regional services to Palaiofarsalos and Larissa 8tpd

== Station layout ==
L Ground/Concourse	Customer service	Tickets/Exits
Level; L1	Side platform, doors will open on the right
Level; L1	Platform 1	to Thessaloniki (Larissa) ←
Level; L1	Platform 2	to Palaiofarsalos (Kalambaka) →
Level; L1	Side platform, doors will open on the right

== See also ==
- Railway stations in Greece
- Hellenic Railways Organization
- Greek Railways
- Hellenic Train
