= Doxaras railway station =

Railway station in Greece

Δοξαρά Doxaras

General information
- Location: Krannonas 415 00, Larissa; Greece
- Coordinates: 39°27′29″N 22°16′26″E
- Elevation: 590 metres (1,940 ft)
- Owner: GAIAOSE
- Line: Regional Piraeus–Platy railway
- Distance: 184 kilometres (114 mi) from Thessaloniki
- Platforms: 2
- Tracks: 2
- Train operators: Hellenic Train

Construction
- Structure type: at-grade
- Platform levels: 1
- Parking: No
- Cycle facilities: No

Other information
- Status: Unstaffed
- Station code: DX
- Website: http://www.ose.gr/en/

History
- Opened: before 1924
- Electrified: 25 kV AC
Location
- Location within Greece

Doxaras railway station (Greek: Σιδηροδρομικός Σταθμός Δοξαρά, romanized: Sidirodromikos stathmos Doxaras) is a railway station in Doxaras, Larissa, Thessaly, Greece. The station is located 550m west of the centre of the settlement, on the Piraeus–Platy railway, 184 kilometres (114 mi) from Thessaloniki, and is severed by Reganal stopping services, and sees two trains a day (as of 2020).

== History ==
On 10 April 1924 in Doxaras, twelve masked men disguised as Manlicher rifles boarded the northbound train from Athens to Thessaloniki at around 01:00 and proceeded to rob the passengers, among them the Minister of Social Welfare of Pazis and the former governor of Macedonia, Ioannis Valalas. The thieves escaped with a haul estimated at around 400,000 Δρ. It was the first large-scale train robbery in Greek history.

On 16 January 1972, at around 16:45 on the line between Doxaras and Orfana, a breakdown in communication between the corresponding stationmasters at Doxaras and Orfana coursed an express train and a military relief train to collided in bad weather on the single track line. The southbound diesel hauled Acropolis Express and northbound Number 121 Athens-Thessaloniki, (known as posta) were allowed to proceed without first allowing a passing loop. 21 people died and more than 40 were injured in one of the deadliest rail accident in Greece. Nikolaos Gekas The stationmaster at Orfana was later sentence of 5 years for his part in the disaster.

On the 5 September 2023, Storm Daniel triggered largescale flooding in Thessaly. The rail infrastructure was badly affected in the region, cutting on both Regional and Intercity routes as significant parts of the infrastructure were washed away. OSE engineers were on the ground in the worst affected areas Domokos, Doxaras, and Paleofarsalos to assess the extent of the damage, and prepare detailed reports, and seek financial assistance from the European Union. 50 km (31 mi) of tracks was completely destroyed

Repairing the extensive damage, was estimated at between 35 and 45 million euros. OSE managing director, Panagiotis Terezakis, spoke of reconstruction works reaching 50 million euros, confirming at the same time that there will be no rail traffic in the effected sections of the network for at least a month. The devastation goes beyond the tracks and signalling, affecting costly equipment such as the European Train Control System (ETCS), which enhances rail safety. In November 2023, rail services resumed between Larissa and Rapsani after a devastating storm in September damaged sections of track across the region. With Through services from Athens to Thessaloniki recommencing on 16 December 2023. However services between Larissa and Volos remain suspended across Thessaly’s coast until the track is repaired, with a rail-replacement bus in operation.

== Services ==
The station is served by local trains to Thessaloniki, Larissa and Paleofarsalos, with only two services calling at the station daly.

== Station Layout ==
L Ground/Concourse	Customer service	Tickets/Exits
Level; L1	Side platform, doors will open on the right
Level; L1	Platform 1	towards Thessaloniki (Kranonas) ←
Level; L1	Platform 2	towards Palaiofarsalos (Orfana) →
Level; L1	Side platform, doors will open on the right
