= Panachaiki railway station =

Railway station in Patras, Greece

Παναχαϊκή Panachaiki
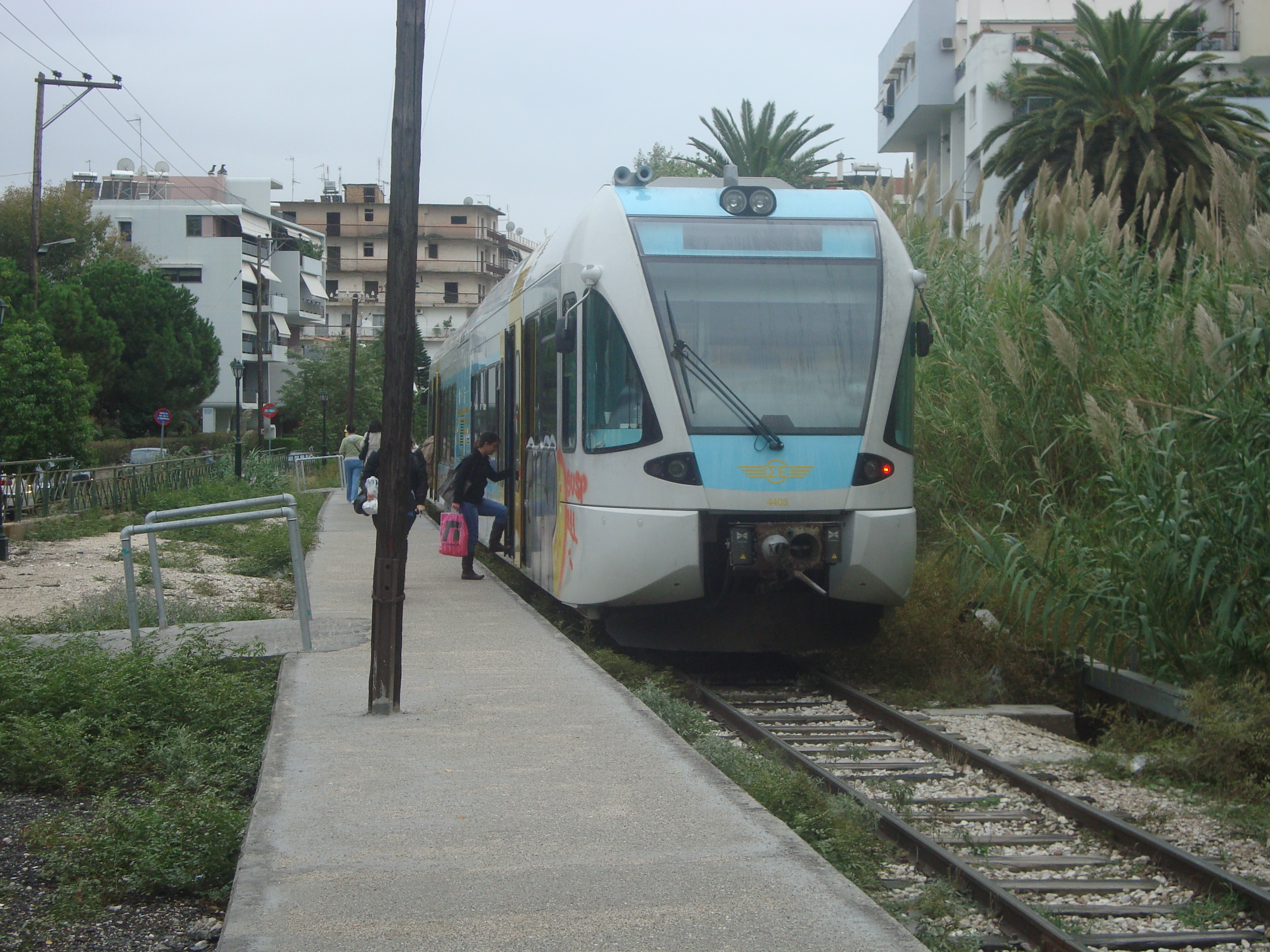
- Panachaiki railway station, view from the railway tracks, October 2011

General information
- Location: 264 41, Patras; Achaea; Greece
- Coordinates: 38°15′44″N 21°44′32″E
- Owner: GAIAOSE
- Manager: Hellenic Train
- Lines: Piraeus–Patras railway and Patras–Kyparissia railway
- Platforms: 2 side platforms
- Tracks: 1
- Train operators: Hellenic Train

Construction
- Structure type: at-grade
- Platform levels: 1
- Parking: No
- Cycle facilities: No

Other information
- Status: unsfaffed
- Fare zone: A (A1)
- Website: http://www.ose.gr/en/

History
- Rebuilt: 9 July 2010; 16 years ago (Line P2)

Services
Preceding station	Suburban Rail	Following station
Patras towards Agios Andreas	Line P2	Agyia towards Rio
Location

Panachaiki railway station (Greek: Σιδηροδρομικός Σταθμός Παναχαϊκή, romanized: Sidirodromikos Stathmos Panachaiki) is a railway station in Patras in the northwestern Peloponnese, Greece. The station is located in the city, close to Pampeloponnisiako Stadium, on Piraeus–Patras line and is severed by Proastiakos Patras Services. Pending the completion of the Athens Airport–Patras railway, it will be connected to Aigio, Diakopto and Kiato, where connecting train services to Athens Airport and Piraeus (via Athens central railway station) are available.

== History ==
From 29 February 2020, service was suspended due to the coronavirus pandemic, becoming the starting point of the new Line P1 of the Suburban Railway to the town of Kato Achaia.

In November 2022, TERNA-MYTILINEOS, the contractor of the project to complete the final phase of Athens Airport–Patras railway was charged with undertaking the electrification project in the previous section, from Kiato to Aegio. With the electric train, the distance on the Athens-Kiato-Rio axis will be covered in less than two hours with an intercity express.

== Facilities ==
The station currently is little more than a halt, with a single platform. The station, however lays close to Pampeloponnisiako Stadium, home of Panachaiki F.C.

== Services ==
The station is served by the Agios Andreas–Rio line of the Proastiakos. Rail services are provided by OSE trains (Stadler GTW 2/6 diesel two-car units). The trains run every hour daily, from 6:23 in the morning until 23:23 in the evening. The Agios Andreas–Rio route has two bus connections at Kastellokampos—to Agios Vasileios and the General University Hospital of Patras via the University of Patras.

Several local bus lines of Patras pass through the station.
