= Patras railway station =

Railway station in Patras, Greece

Πάτρα Patra
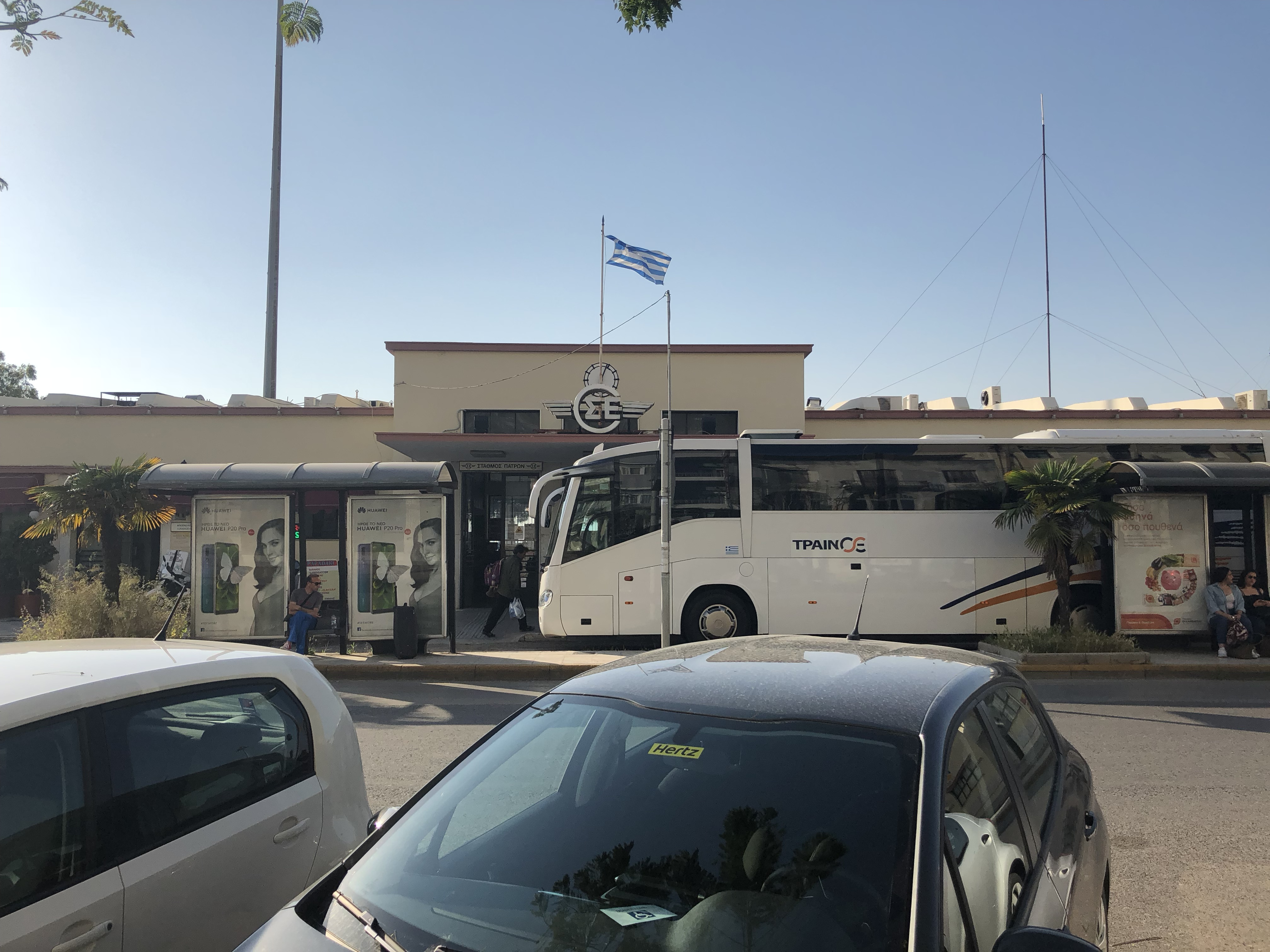
- Patras railway station, view from theforecourt, May 2018.

General information
- Location: Othonos kai Amalias, 262 21, Patras; Achaea; Greece
- Coordinates: 38°14′59″N 21°44′06″E
- Owner: GAIAOSE
- Manager: Hellenic Train
- Lines: Piraeus–Patras railway and Patras–Kyparissia railway
- Platforms: 2 side platforms
- Tracks: 2
- Train operators: Hellenic Train
- Connections: Bus

Construction
- Structure type: at-grade
- Platform levels: 1
- Parking: Yes
- Cycle facilities: No

Other information
- Status: Unstaffed
- Fare zone: A (A1)
- Website: http://www.ose.gr/en/

History
- Opened: 1954
- Rebuilt: 9 July 2010; 16 years ago

Services
Preceding station	Suburban Rail	Following station
Agios Andreas Terminus	Line P2	Panachaiki towards Rio
Former services
SPAP
Terminus	Piraeus–Patras railway	Panachaiki
Location

Patras railway station (Greek: Σιδηροδρομικός Σταθμός Πατρών, romanized: Sidirodromikos Stathmos Patron) is a railway station in Patras in the northwestern Peloponnese, Greece. The station is located in the center of the city, beside the north port on Piraeus–Patras line and Patras–Kyparissia line and is served by both Proastiakos Patras Services. Pending the completion of the Athens Airport–Patras railway, it is also the starting point of TrainOSE bus lines to Aigio, Diakopto and Kiato, where connecting train services to Athens Airport and Piraeus (via Athens central railway station) are available.

== History ==
The station opened in 1954 as the main passenger terminal of the city (replacing the older Agios Dionysios as the closest station to the city centre) on the Kryoneri-Agrinio line, constructed in 1890. Originally located near the current hotel "Astir" Considerations for the construction of the station near the port of Patras had as early as 1901. A holt had opened for commercial use one due to its proximity to the port with the construction in 1890 of the Kryoneri-Agrinio line, the station became the end of that line. The goods were transported to the city port to be unloaded on ships. as a result when the station opened in 1954 it became both the terminal of the line Piraeus-Patras and a starting point of the now defunct Patras-Kyparissia line.

In 1970 OSE became the legal successor to the SEK, taking over responsibilities for most of Greece's rail infrastructure. On 1 January 1971, the station and most of Greek rail infrastructure were transferred to the Hellenic Railways Organisation S.A., a state-owned corporation. Freight traffic declined sharply when the state-imposed monopoly of OSE for the transport of agricultural products and fertilisers ended in the early 1990s. Many small stations of the network with little passenger traffic were closed down. In 2005 operations from the station were suspended due to the reconstruction works of the OSE railway network in the region. In 2009, with the Greek debt crisis unfolding OSE's Management was forced to reduce services across the network. Timetables were cut back and routes closed as the government-run entity attempted to reduce overheads. The station reopened on 9 July 2010 as part of the Proastiakos Patras services, served by trains between Agios Andreas and Agios Vassilios stations. Since the suspension of regional services on the metre-gauge railways of the Peloponnese in 2011, the station is used only by local Proastiakos trains which currently connect the city with the suburbs of Rio and Kaminia. In 2017 OSE's passenger transport sector was privatised as TrainOSE, currently, a wholly owned subsidiary of Ferrovie dello Stato Italiane infrastructure, including stations, remained under the control of OSE. From 29 February 2020 service were suspended due to the coronavirus pandemic, becoming the starting point of the new Line P1 of the Suburban Railway to the town of Kato Achaia. With the resumption of services on 4 July 2020, it was replaced as the starting point of Line P1 by Agios Andreas.

In August 2025, the Greek Ministry of Infrastructure and Transport confirmed the creation of a new body, Greek Railways (Greek: Σιδηρόδρομοι Ελλάδος, romanized: Ellinikí Sidiródromi Monoprósopi) to assume responsibility for rail infrastructure, planning, modernisation projects, and rolling stock across Greece. Previously, these functions were divided among several state-owned entities: OSE, which managed infrastructure; ERGOSÉ, responsible for modernisation projects; and GAIAOSÉ, which owned stations, buildings, and rolling stock. OSE had overseen both infrastructure and operations until its vertical separation in 2005. Rail safety has been identified as a key priority. The merger follows the July approval of a Parliamentary Bill to restructure the national railway system, a direct response to the Tempi accident of February 2023, in which 43 people died after a head-on collision.

The station also serves as the starting point of the Hellenic Train bus services that connects Patras with Kiato via Diakopto, where the starting point of Odontotos is located. The railway response takes place at Kiato station with the Athens Suburban Railway. The trains of the latter run on the line Airport-Patras, the construction of which has been completed to Rododafni, Achaia.

== Facilities ==
The station lies in central Patras between Othonos-Amalias Avenue and the north port. It is a small concrete building, typical of the 1950s, without any modern facilities. Beside the station, there is a restaurant and a cafeteria. There is only a single platform and two meter gauge rail tracks. After the completion of the new railway line the station will move to another more spacious building, but still, there are no publicly available data regarding the location and the architectural design of the new station.

Within a few meters distance from the station, there is the Patras Railway Museum open-air showroom which hosts a very old locomotive of the Piraeus, Athens and Peloponnese Railways (SPAP) No. Zs 7.532

== Services ==
The station is served by the Agios Andreas–Rio line of the Proastiakos, with another line running from the Agios Andreas terminus to Kaminia pending the extension to Kato Achaia. Rail services are provided by OSE trains (Stadler GTW 2/6 diesel two-car units). The trains run every hour daily, from 6:23 in the morning until 23:23 in the evening. The Agios Andreas–Rio route has two bus connections at Kastellokampos—to Agios Vasileios and the General University Hospital of Patras via the University of Patras.

Several local bus lines of Patras pass through the station.

== Gallery ==
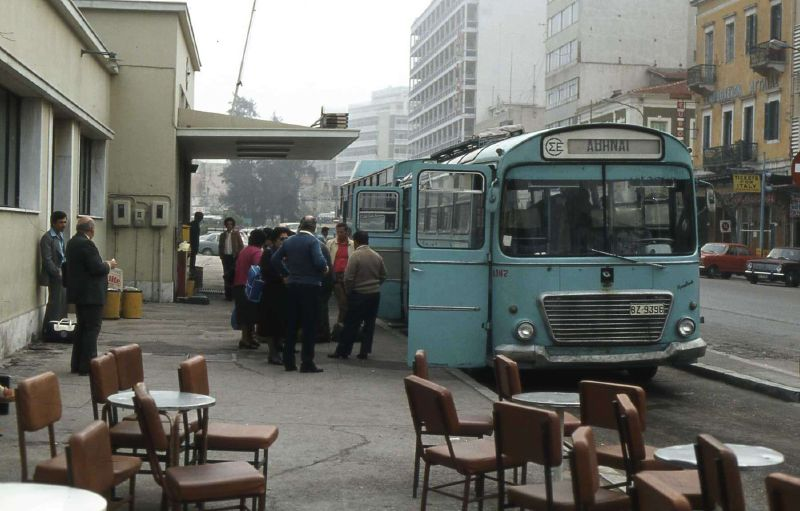
Patras railway station in 1981

== See also ==
- Railway stations in Greece
- Hellenic Railways Organisation
- Hellenic Train
- Thessaloniki railway station
- P.A.Th.E./P.
- Patras Suburban Railway
- Railways of Greece
