= Vrachneika railway station =

Railway station in Patras, Greece

Βραχναίικων Vrachneika
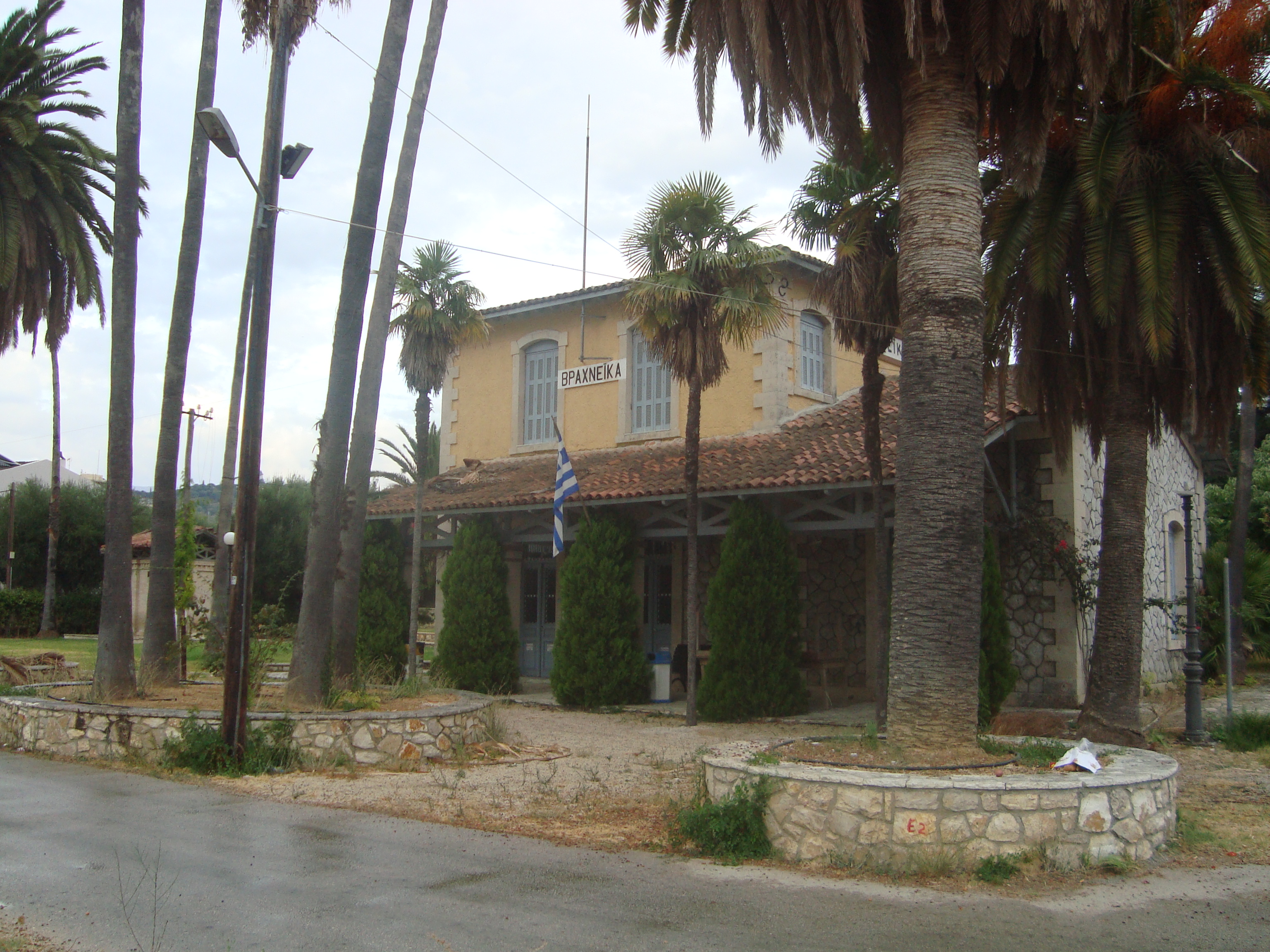
- Vrachneika railway station, September 2010

General information
- Location: 250 02, Vrachaiika; Achaea; Greece
- Coordinates: 38°09′56″N 21°40′19″E
- Owner: GAIAOSE
- Line: Patras–Kyparissia railway
- Platforms: 2 side platforms
- Tracks: 3 (1 disused)
- Train operators: Hellenic Train

Construction
- Structure type: at-grade
- Platform levels: 1
- Parking: Yes
- Cycle facilities: No

Other information
- Status: Unstaffed
- Fare zone: B & C
- Website: http://www.ose.gr/en/

History
- Opened: 15 December 1888; 137 years ago
- Closed: Unknown
- Rebuilt: 29 February 2020; 6 years ago (Line 2)

Services
Preceding station	Suburban Rail	Following station
Tsoukalaiika towards Kato Achaia	Line P1	Mindiloglio towards Agios Andreas
Location

Vrachneika railway station (Greek: Σιδηροδρομικός Σταθμός Βραχναίικων, romanized: Sidirodromikos Stathmos Vrachneika) is a railway station in Vrachneika, a suburb in southern Patras, Greece. The station is on the former Patras–Kyparissia line and is served by Proastiakos Patras Services.

== History ==
The station opened originally opened on 15 December 1888 as the fourth intermediate stop on the Patras-Kyparissia railway line, serving Vrachneika, Dresthena and Monodendri communities. The station closed during World War I, but it's unclear when, however, the line continued to be used. In 1970 OSE became the legal successor to the SEK, taking over responsibilities for most of Greece's rail infrastructure. On 1 January 1971, the station and most of Greek rail infrastructure were transferred to the Hellenic Railways Organisation S.A., a state-owned corporation. Freight traffic declined sharply when the state-imposed monopoly of OSE for the transport of agricultural products and fertilisers ended in the early 1990s. Many small stations of the network with little passenger traffic were closed down. In 2005 operations from the station were suspended due to the reconstruction works of the OSE railway network in the region. In 2009, with the Greek debt crisis unfolding OSE's Management was forced to reduce services across the network. Timetables were cut back, and routes closed as the government-run entity attempted to reduce overheads. The station reopened on 9 July 2010 as part of the Proastiakos Patras services, served by trains between Agios Andreas and Agios Vassilios stations. Since the suspension of regional services on the metre-gauge railways of the Peloponnese in 2011, In 2017 OSE's passenger transport sector was privatised as TrainOSE, currently, a wholly owned subsidiary of Ferrovie dello Stato Italiane infrastructure, including stations, remained under the control of OSE. It reopened on 29 February 2020 as the fifth stop of Line 1 of the Patras Suburban Railway, with an operating with the extension of its routes to the town of Kato Achaia

In 2020 employees of the Cleaning, Lighting and Greenery services in Patras, completely cleared and remodelled Old Railway Station garden, thus creating a recreation area, in which civil weddings can also take place. On Saturday 27 June 2020, Achaean actor Alexandros Bourdoumis and Patrini actress Lena Drossaki were married at the station.

== Facilities ==
The station building is set back from the tracks, which includes a through road (El. Venizelou) passing through the station. The station itself is unstaffed, with few facilities, aside from seating in the old building. At platform level, there are no sheltered seating but no Dot-matrix display departure, arrival screens or public address (PA) systems; however, timetable poster boards on both platforms are available.

== Services ==
Since 1 August 2023, when line numbers were introduced, Vrachneika is served by Line P1 of the Patras Suburban Railway between Agios Andreas and Kato Achaia or Kaminia, with up to one train per hour, in each direction.

Line P2, accessible via Agios Andreas, has two bus connections at Kastellokampos: one for Agios Vasileios, and another for the General University Hospital of Patras via the University of Patras.

== See also ==
- Railway stations in Greece
- Hellenic Railways Organization
- Hellenic Train
- Proastiakos
