= Ities railway station =

Railway station of Patras in the Peloponnese, Greece

Ιτιές Ities
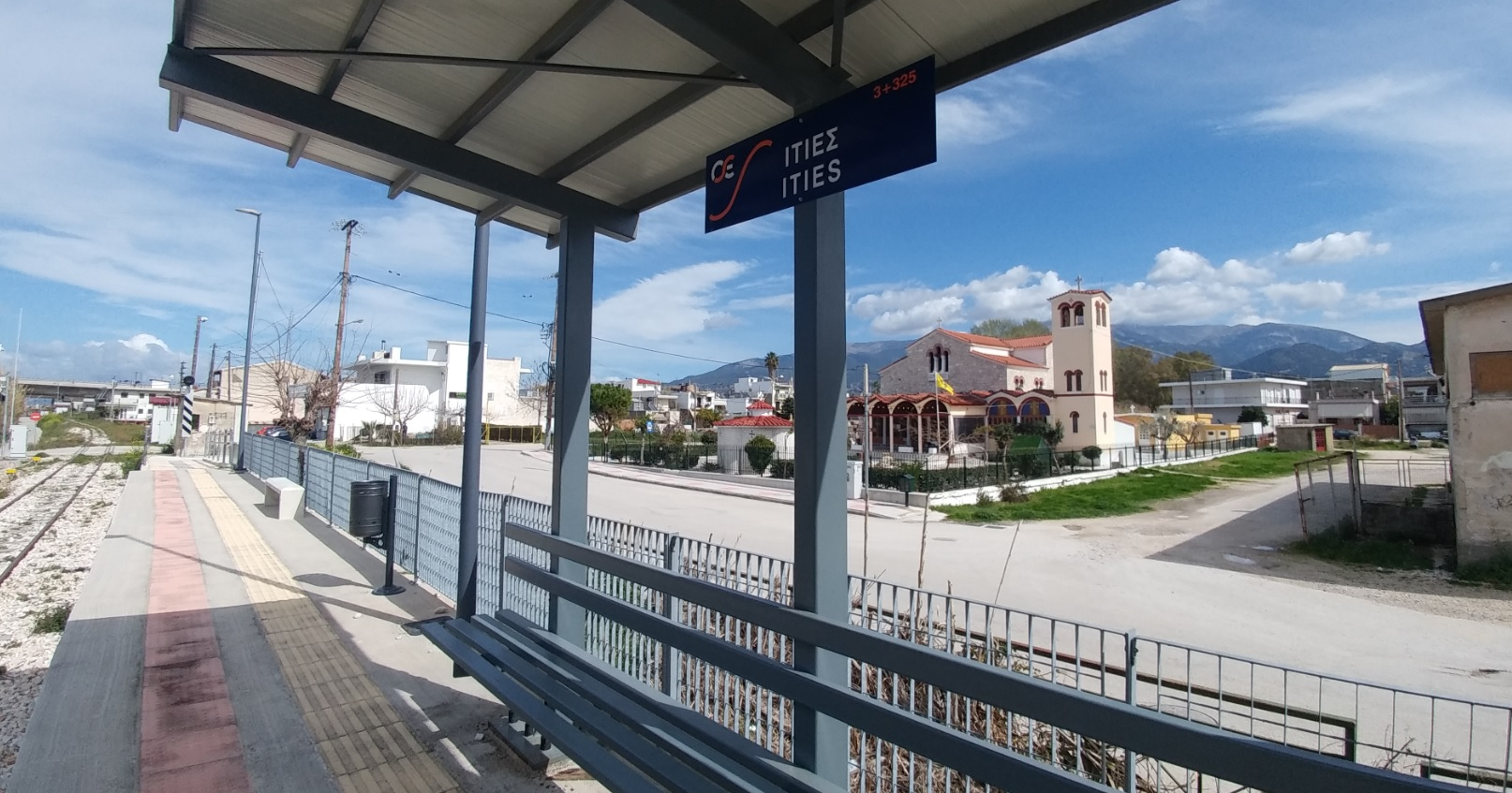
- Iteon railway station, March 2020

General information
- Location: 252 00, West Achaea; Achaea; Greece
- Coordinates: 38°12′43″N 21°43′07″E
- Owner: GAIAOSE
- Operator: Hellenic Train
- Manager: Hellenic Train
- Line: Patras–Kyparissia railway
- Platforms: 2 side platforms
- Tracks: 1

Construction
- Structure type: at-grade
- Platform levels: 1
- Parking: Yes
- Cycle facilities: No

Other information
- Status: Unstaffed
- Fare zone: A (A1)
- Website: http://www.ose.gr/en/

Key dates
- 15 December 1888: Opened
- 2005: Closed
- 2005: Reopened
- 9 July 2010: Reopened
- 29 February 2020: Suburban Railway opened

Services
Preceding station	Suburban Rail	Following station
Paralia Patron towards Kato Achaia	Line P1	Antheia towards Agios Andreas
Location

Ities railway station (Greek: Σιδηροδρομικός Σταθμός Ιτιές, romanized: Sidirodromikos Stathmos Iteon) is a railway station on Iteon Road in Patras, Peloponnese, Greece. The station is on the former Patras–Kyparissia line and is served by Proastiakos Patras Services.

== History ==
The station opened originally opened on 15 December 1888 on the metric line to Kyparissia. The station closed during World War I, but it's unclear when. however, the line continued to be used. The ruins of the original station buildings can be seen adjacent to the new station, on Sounio street towards Anapirika Iteon. In 1970 OSE became the legal successor to the SEK, taking over responsibilities for most of Greece's rail infrastructure. On 1 January 1971, the station and most of Greek rail infrastructure were transferred to the Hellenic Railways Organisation S.A., a state-owned corporation. Freight traffic declined sharply when the state-imposed monopoly of OSE for the transport of agricultural products and fertilisers ended in the early 1990s. Many small stations of the network with little passenger traffic were closed down. In 2005 operations from the station were suspended due to the reconstruction works of the OSE railway network in the region. In 2009, with the Greek debt crisis unfolding OSE's Management was forced to reduce services across the network. Timetables were cut back, and routes closed as the government-run entity attempted to reduce overheads. The station reopened on 9 July 2010 as part of the Proastiakos Patras services, served by trains between Agios Andreas and Agios Vassilios stations. Since the suspension of regional services on the metre-gauge railways of the Peloponnese in 2011, the station is used only by local Proastiakos trains which currently connect the city with the suburbs of Rio and Kaminia. In 2017 OSE's passenger transport sector was privatised as TrainOSE, currently, a wholly owned subsidiary of Ferrovie dello Stato Italiane infrastructure, including stations, remained under the control of OSE.

It reopened on 29 February 2020 as an intermediate station when Line 2 of the Patras Suburban Railway began operating with the extension of its routes to the town of Kato Achaia

Service were suspended due to the coronavirus pandemic, becoming the starting point of the new Line 2 of the Suburban Railway to the town of Kato Achaia. With the resumption of services on 4 July 2020, it was replaced as the starting point of Line 2 by Agios Andreas.

== Facilities ==
The station is an unstaffed but modern halt, with few facilities, aside from two small shelters with seating. There is no cafe or shop on-site. At platform level, there are sheltered seating but no Dot-matrix display departure, arrival screens or public address (PA) systems; however, timetable poster boards on both platforms are available. The Station was also built with Tactile paving, in this case controlled pedestrian crossing warning or warning block for the blind.

== Services ==
Since 1 August 2023, when line numbers were introduced, Ities is served by Line P1 of the Patras Suburban Railway between Agios Andreas and Kato Achaia or Kaminia, with up to one train per hour, in each direction.

Line P2, accessible via Agios Andreas, has two bus connections at Kastellokampos: one for Agios Vasileios, and another for the General University Hospital of Patras via the University of Patras.

== See also ==
- Railway stations in Greece
- Hellenic Railways Organization
- Hellenic Train
- Proastiakos
