= Rio railway station =

Railway station in the Peloponnese, Greece

Ρίο Rio
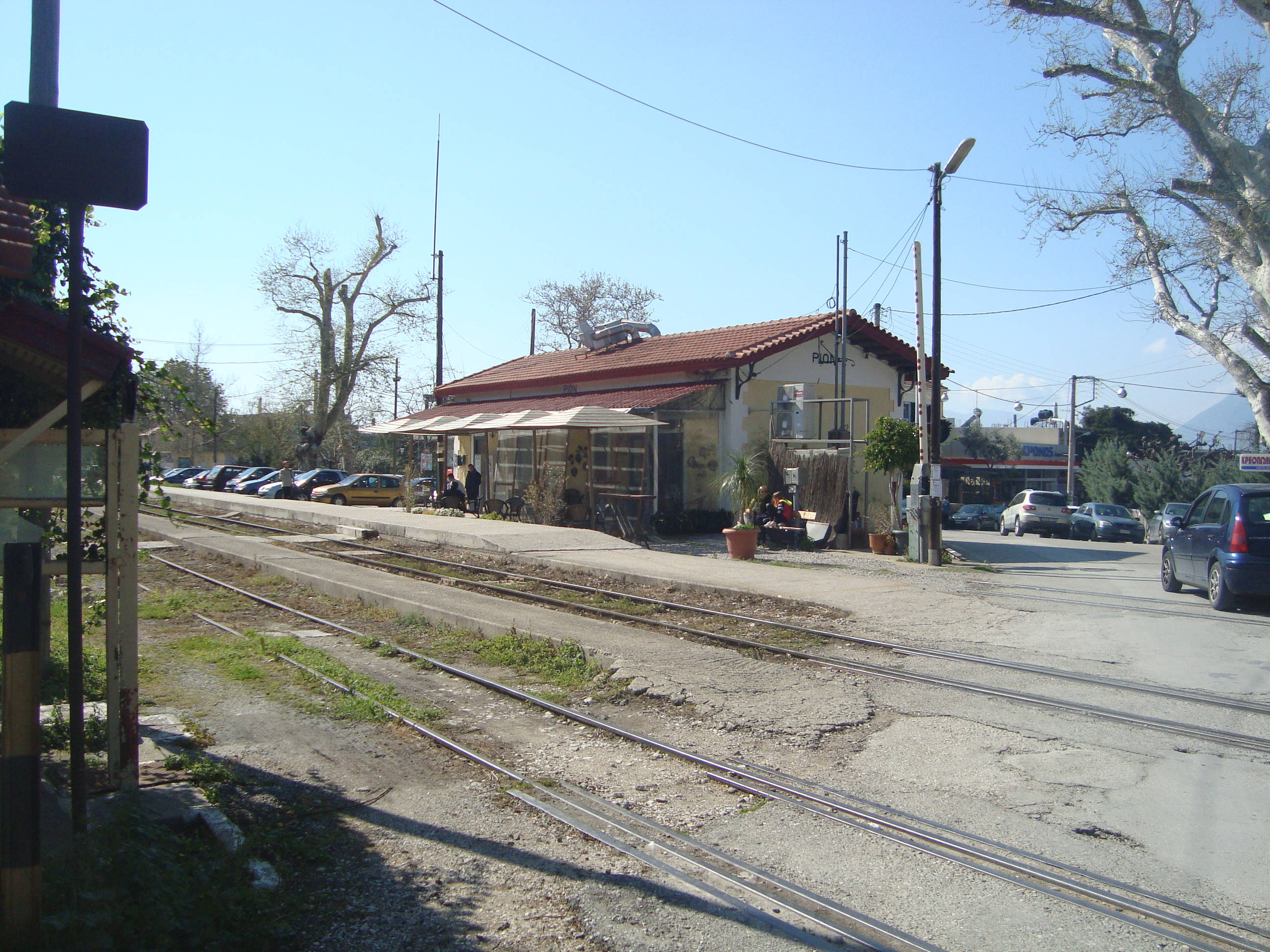
- Rio railway station, view from the railway tracks before closure, 20 March 2016.

General information
- Location: Somerset 66, Rio; 265 04 Patras; Greece
- Coordinates: 38°18′03″N 21°46′56″E
- Owner: GAIAOSE
- Manager: Hellenic Train
- Lines: Piraeus–Patras railway and Patras–Kyparissia railway
- Platforms: 1 side platform (disused)
- Tracks: 2 (disused)
- Train operators: Hellenic Train

Construction
- Structure type: at-grade
- Platform levels: 1
- Parking: Yes
- Cycle facilities: No

Other information
- Fare zone: A (A1)
- Website: http://www.ose.gr/en/

History
- Opened: 1887
- Closed: 26 March 2019
- Rebuilt: currently

Services
Preceding station	Suburban Rail	Following station
Kastellokampos towards Agios Andreas	Line P2	Terminus
Former services
SPAP
Kastellokampos	Piraeus–Patras railway	Agios Vasileios
Location

Rio railway station (Greek: Σιδηροδρομική Στάση Ρίο, romanized: Sidirodromiki stasi Pio) is a railway station in Rio, a town in the suburbs of Patras in the northwestern Peloponnese, Greece. The station is located just outside the centre of the city, on Piraeus–Patras line and Patras–Kyparissia line and is served by both Proastiakos Patras Services. Pending the completion of the Athens Airport–Patras railway, it is also the starting point of Hellenic Train bus lines to Aigio, Diakopto and Kiato, where connecting train services to Athens Airport and Piraeus (via Athens central railway station) are available. Diakopto is also the terminus of the unique rack railway to Kalavryta.

The station (and the section of line) is currently closed and under reconstruction as part of the construction of the new Athens-Patras railway line, which (when completed) will allow fastener connectivity with Athens. As a result, a new temporary station *with the same name) has been operating since 26 March 2019, at the junction of Zaimi & Iroon Polytechneiou streets (600 m west of the station building), which serves the trains of the Patras suburban train. however the stations café, Rio Rages Cafe, is currently (as of 2022) open).

== History ==
The station opened in 1887 as the main passenger terminal of the city. With the construction in 1890 of the Kryoneri-Agrinio line, the station became the end of that line.

In 1970 OSE became the legal successor to the SEK, taking over responsibilities for most of Greece's rail infrastructure. On 1 January 1971, the station and most of Greek rail infrastructure were transferred to the Hellenic Railways Organisation S.A., a state-owned corporation. Freight traffic declined sharply when the state-imposed monopoly of OSE for the transport of agricultural products and fertilisers ended in the early 1990s. Many small stations of the network with little passenger traffic were closed down. In 2005 operations from the station were suspended due to the reconstruction works of the OSE railway network in the region. In 2009, with the Greek debt crisis unfolding OSE's Management was forced to reduce services across the network. Timetables were cut back and routes closed as the government-run entity attempted to reduce overheads. The station reopened on 9 July 2010 as part of the Proastiakos Patras services, served by trains between Agios Andreas and Agios Vassilios stations. Since the suspension of regional services on the metre-gauge railways of the Peloponnese in 2011, the station is used only by local Proastiakos trains which currently connect the city with the suburbs of Rio and Kaminia. In 2017 OSE's passenger transport sector was privatised as TrainOSE, currently, a wholly owned subsidiary of Ferrovie dello Stato Italiane infrastructure, including stations, remained under the control of OSE.

The station (and the section of line) closed 26 March 2019 for reconstruction as part of the construction of the new Athens-Patras railway line, with a new temporary station (with the same name), at the junction of Zaimi & Iroon Polytechneiou streets (600 m west of the station building). From 29 February 2020 service across the network were suspended due to the coronavirus pandemic, becoming the starting point of the new Line P1 of the Suburban Railway to the town of Kato Achaia. With the resumption of services on 4 July 2020, it was replaced as the starting point of Line P1 by Agios Andreas.

In 2022 the contract to upgrade and rebuild the section of the line was signed. The contract, undertaken by ERGOSE through the TERNA-MYTILINEOS scheme from 22 November 2022 and has a completion period of 36 months. At a cost €174.97 million, its funding has been secured by the NSRF 2014–2020 while it is expected to continue as a bridge project from the NSRF 2021–2027.

== Facilities ==
The station building lies in southeast of the settlement on Somerset. It is a small original station building, now used as a cafe. There is only a single platform and two meter gauge rail tracks (now disused).

== Services ==
The station (the temporary one) is served by the Agios Andreas–Rio line of the Proastiakos, with another line running from the Agios Andreas terminus to Kaminia pending the extension to Kato Achaia. Rail services are provided by OSE trains (Stadler GTW 2/6 diesel two-car units). The trains run every hour daily, from 06:23 in the morning until 23:23 in the evening. The Agios Andreas–Rio route has two bus connections at Kastellokampos—to Agios Vasileios and the General University Hospital of Patras via the University of Patras.
