= Proastiakos =

Commuter rail service in Greece

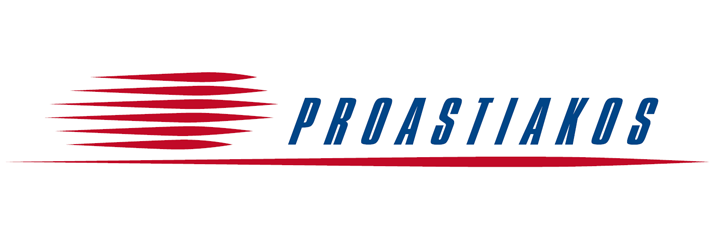

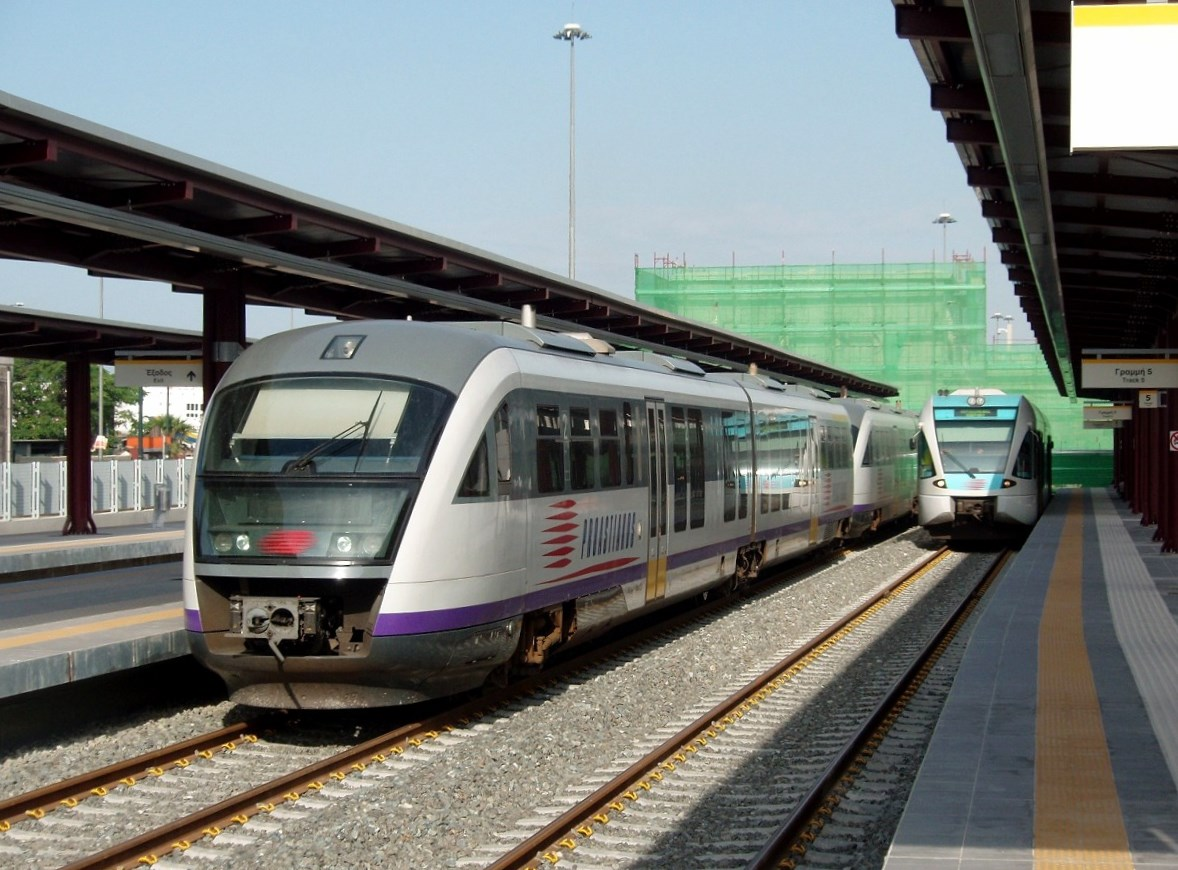
- Piraeus suburban railway station, June 2007

Overview
- Locale: Athens, Thessaloniki, Patras
- Current operator: Hellenic Train
- Ridership: 10.1 million (2020)

The Proastiakos (Greek: Προαστιακός; "suburban") is Greece's commuter rail service, run by Hellenic Train, on rail infrastructure owned by the Hellenic Railways Organisation (OSE) (lines) and GAIAOSE (buildings and Trains). These services connect a participating city's central railway station to important locations such as a city's port or airport, as well as its suburbs and occasionally nearby towns and cities.

As of September 2020, there are three Proastiakos networks serving the country's three largest cities: Athens, Thessaloniki, and Patras, providing them with commuter rail links towards their suburbs and also with regional services to other cities and towns. In 2016, the three systems carried 10.1 million passengers.

As of 8 January 2017, the lines between the central stations of Athens and Halkida have been electrified, allowing EMU train service. The lines have been changed, making Athens's central station the main layover station. Those lines are Athens – ATH, Athens – Kiato, Athens – Chalcis.

In Thessaloniki, there are two Proastiakos services. The first connects the city's Main Railway Station with the cities of Katerini and Larissa, and the second links the city with Edessa.

In July 2010, a new commuter rail service was launched in Patras on a section of the old Patras–Kyparissia line reconnecting the city with Rio. The service was later extended to Agios Andreas as Line P2. In 2020 services were reconnected to Kato Achaia via Agios Andreas as Line P1.

== History ==
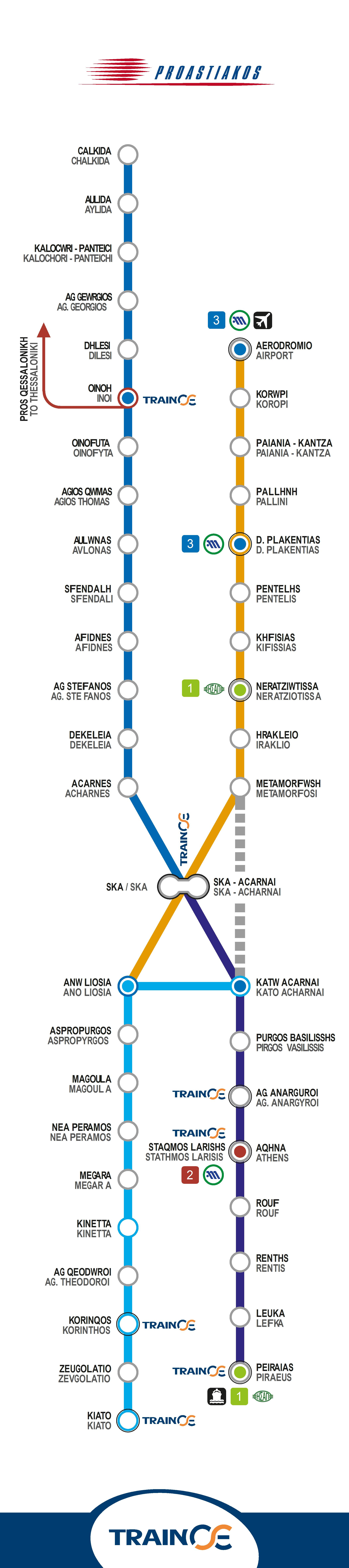
Athens Suburban Railway map c.2012, in English and Greek

The concept of regular and frequent suburban and commuter rail services was introduced in Greece in the 1990s. It became possible due to extra capacity becoming available through improvements to the existing lines and the construction of new ones. In the past, suburban services ran on very infrequent timetables and were not very popular.

The construction of a new rail line between central Athens, its eastern suburbs, and the new Athens International Airport was decided in 1992–1993. During the construction of Attiki Odos motorway in the late 1990s, space was left between the main carriageways for the railway line. After two years of construction, the line to Athens International Airport opened in 2004. The first suburban services between Athens and the Airport were inaugurated using Stadler GTW and Siemens Desiro DMU trains.

On 27 September 2005, the new standard gauge rail line reached Corinth, terminating at a new station, located at Examilia. This line today is served by "Proastiakos" suburban services, while initially "Proastiakos" trains stopped at Nea Peramos, Megara, Kinetta, and Agioi Theodoroi. On 18 July 2006, three new stations were added: Ano Liosia, Aspropyrgos, and Magoula. On 4 June 2007, the line was extended from Athens Central Station to the port of Piraeus with 3 intermediate stations at Lefka, Rentis, and Rouf. This extension linked the airport with the port of Piraeus. On 9 July 2007, Proastiakos services reached the new station at Kiato.

Hellenic Train also runs "Proastiakos" commuter rail services between the cities of Thessaloniki and Larissa, on the modernised and electrified main line. The service initially operated from Thessaloniki to Litochoro in 2007 and was extended to Larissa in 2008.

In 2009 the brand name "Proastiakos" was also used for a short-lived regional service of four trains in each direction per day, connecting the cities of Xanthi, Komotini, and Alexandroupolis in the region of Western Thrace.

In 2010, TrainOSE created the Proastiakos Patras service which runs on the old Athens-Patras line from Agios Andreas to Agios Vassileos.

In May 2020 TrainOSE updated its electronic ticketing system to support social distancing on all Proastiakos services. The system stopped selling tickets when capacity on that train had reached 50 percent, TrainOSE CEO Filippos Tsalidis told reporters during a press briefing on safety measures to prevent Covid-19 infection during travel.

== Athens Suburban Railway ==
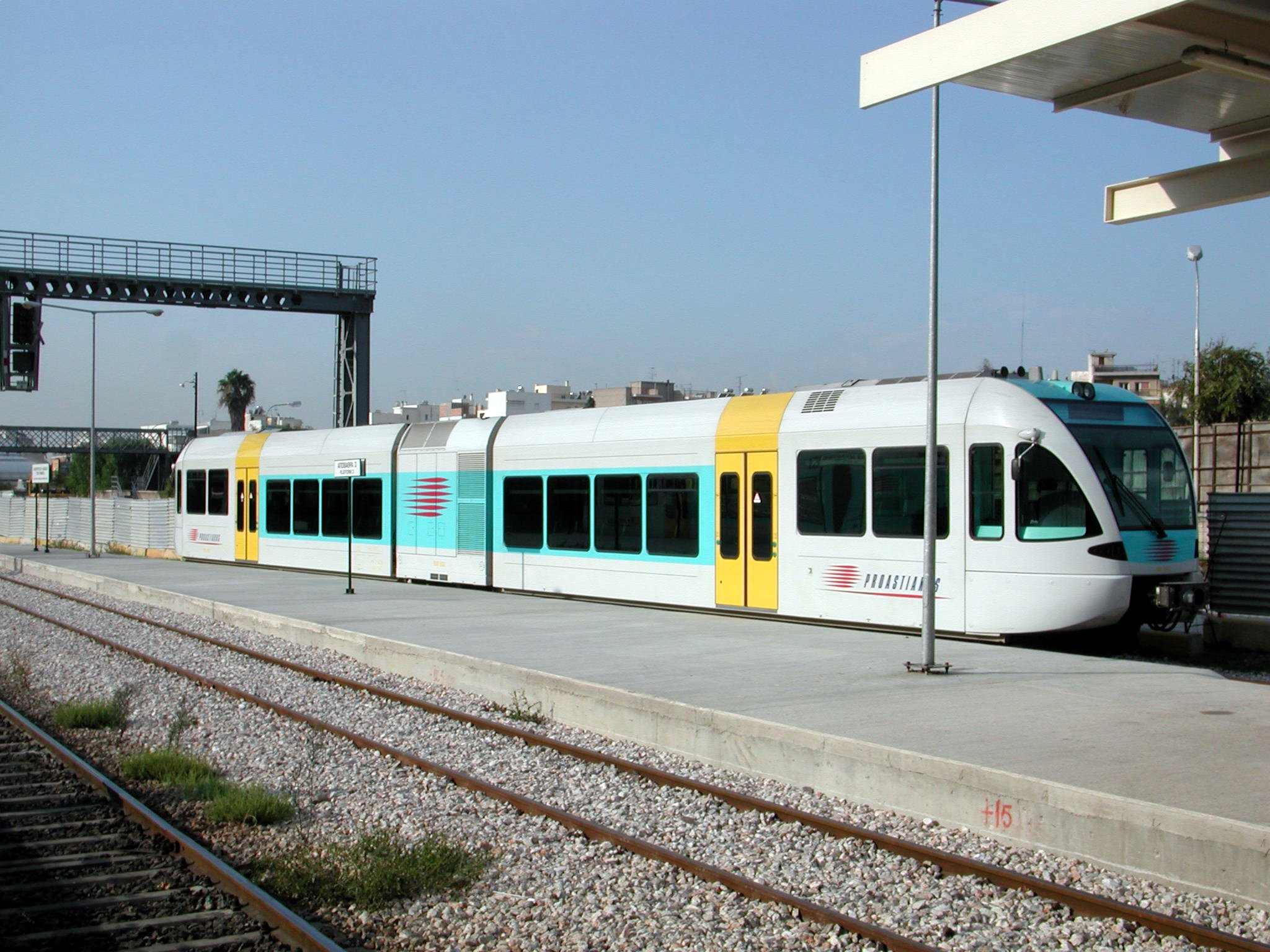
A Stadler GTW-2/6 DMU train in Athens railway station

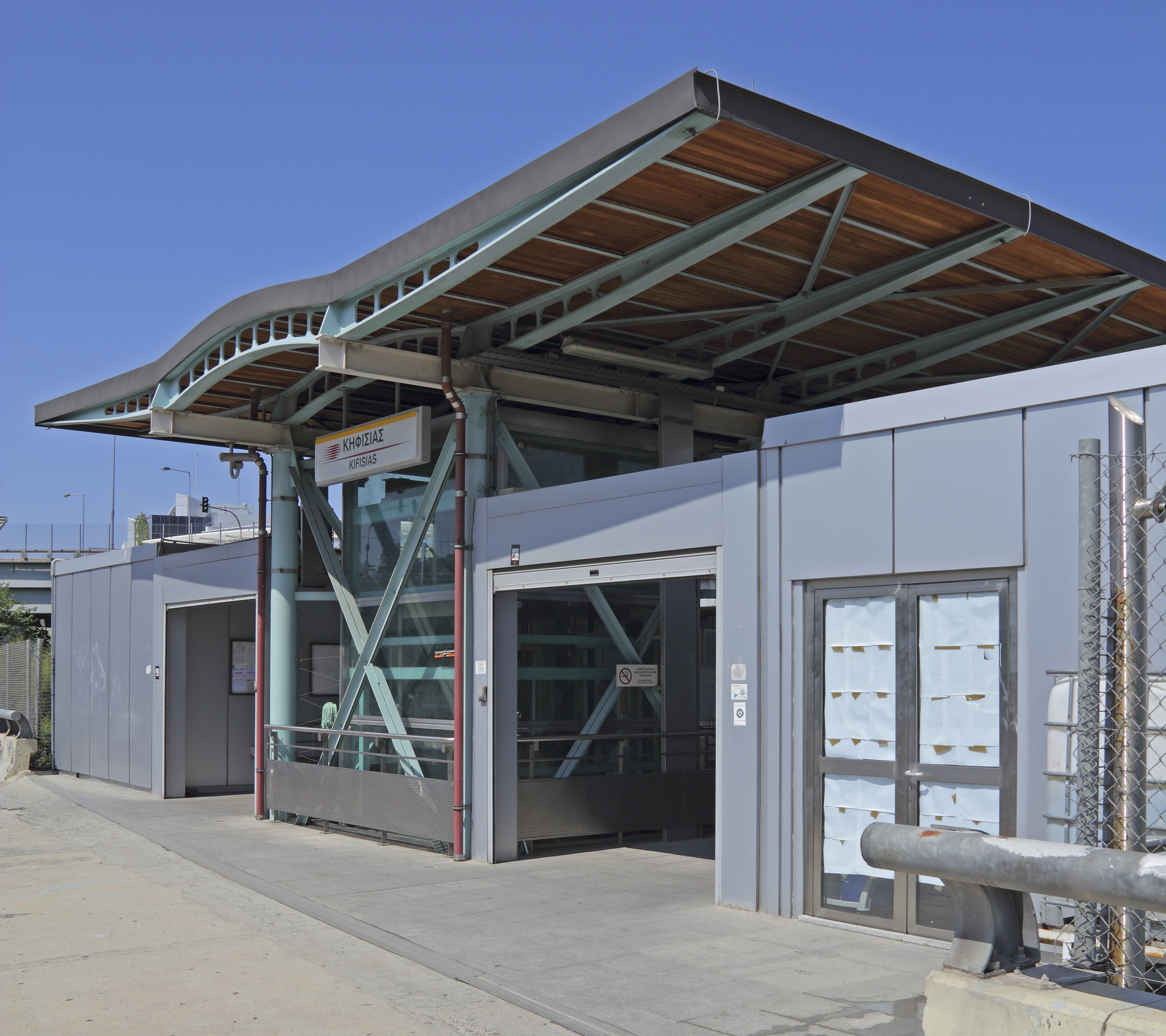
Kifisias railway station on Lines A1 and A2

The Athens Suburban Railway consists of five routes: Piraeus–Airport via Athens, Piraeus–Kiato via Athens, Athens–Chalcis via Oinoi, Ano Liosia–Airport via Koropi, and Aigio–Athens/Airport via Kiato. Trains run from 4:30 am to midnight daily, and there are 53 stations in total.

On 18 January 2012, services were "temporarily" suspended on routes from Piraeus - Ano Liossia. According to a TrainOSE spokesperson, the interruption is due to technical problems; however no information on the progress of any work was given, services were rerouted via SKA.

The following table lists the routes and the stations for the Athens Suburban Railway since 15 May 2022:

Athens Suburban Railway routes
Prefix	Route number	Route	Stations	Length	Time	Ref.
12xx	A1	Piraeus–Athens–Athens Airport	19	48.23 km	1:03	
13xx, 23xx	A4	Piraeus–Athens–Kiato	20	120.70 km	1:40	
15xx, 25xx, 35xx	A3	Athens–Chalcis	17	82.80 km	1:18	
22xx	A2	Ano Liosia–Paiania–Kantza–Athens Airport	12	33.18 km	0:34	
42xx	A2	Ano Liosia–Paiania–Kantza	10	18.60 km	0:23	
3xx		Kiato–Aigio	9	70.38 km	0:52	

=== Connections ===
The suburban railway connects with the other urban railways of Athens at the following stations:

- Piraeus: The suburban station is located close to the Metro Line 1 terminus, as well as the Metro Line 3 station.
- Athens Central Station: connection with Metro line 2.
- Neratziotissa: Connection with Metro Line 1.
- Plakentias: connection with Metro line 3.
- Kato Acharnes: connecting the line Kiato-Piraeus with Piraeus-Airport and Chalcis-Athens.
- Acharnes (SKA): passengers can transfer to the mainline and regional rail service of Greece. Also, connecting the Ano Liosia-Airport and Athens-Chalkis lines.
- Pallini: shared station with Metro line 3.
- Paiania–Kantza: shared station with Metro line 3.
- Koropi: shared station with Metro line 3.
- Airport: shared station with Metro line 3.
- Kiato: passengers can transfer to Hellenic Train bus services to Patras.

== Thessaloniki Regional Railway ==
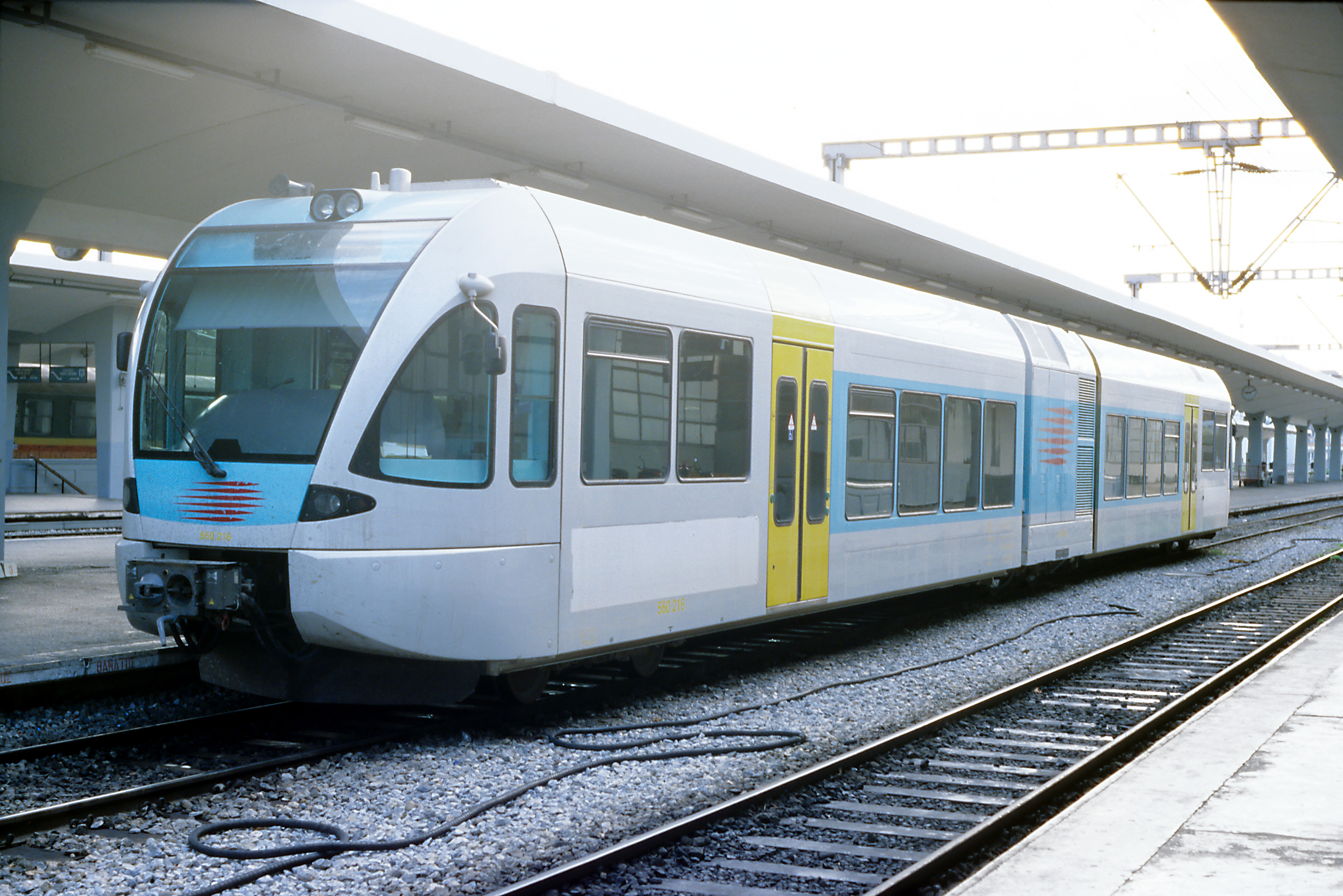
A Stadler GTW-2/6 DMU train in Thessaloniki new railway station

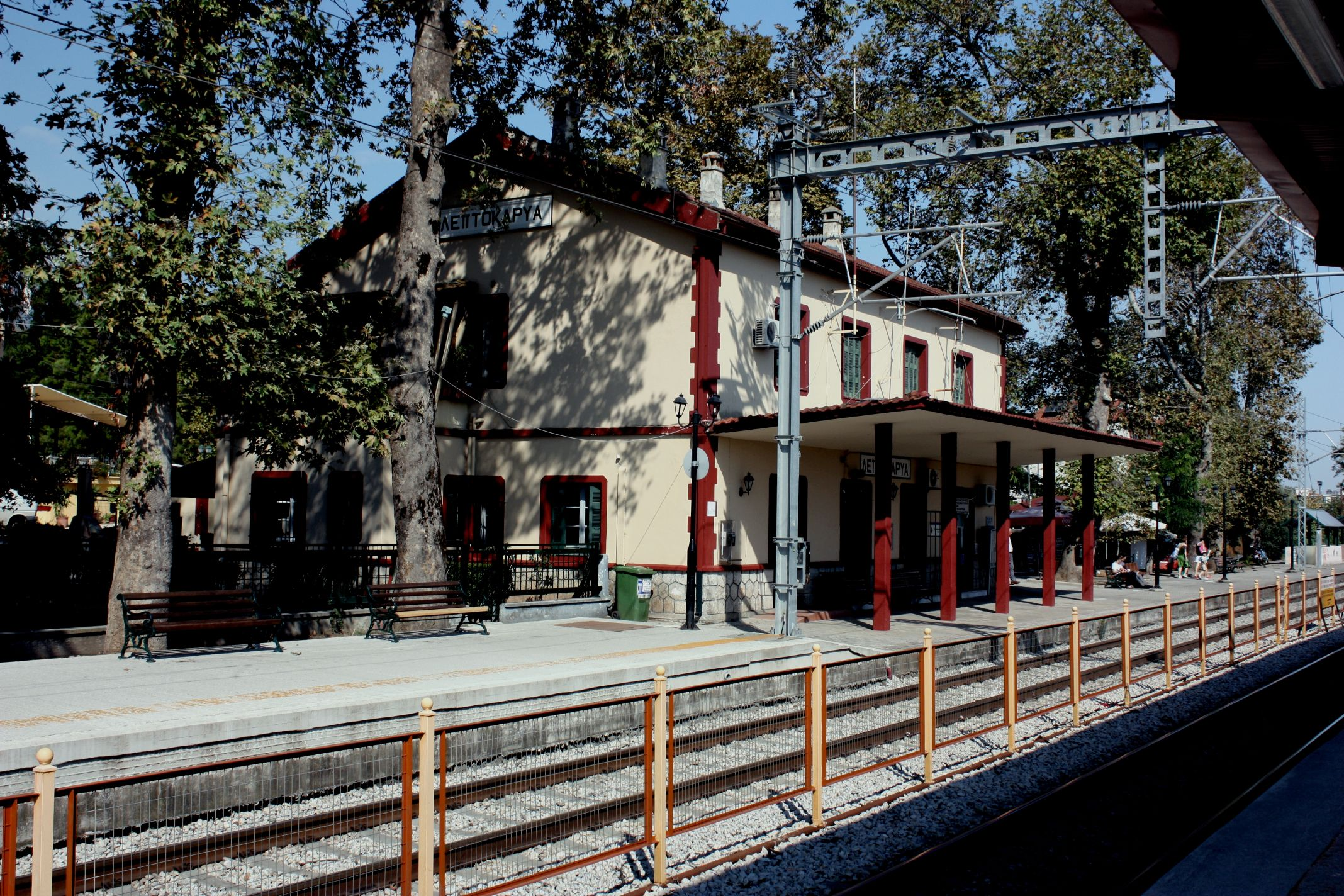
Leptokarya railway station on Line 1

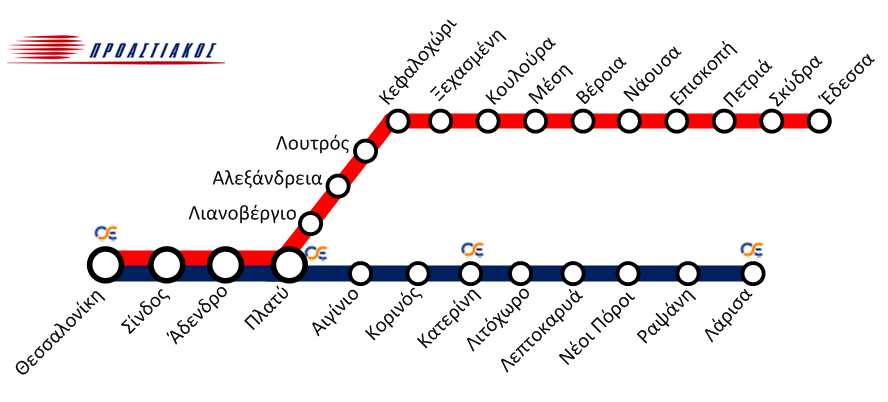
Thessaloniki Proastiakos map c.2012, (before Line 3 was introduced)

The Suburban railway in Thessaloniki consists of three routes: one from Thessaloniki to Larissa, one from Thessaloniki to Florina, and the one to Drama. Services run from approximately 5:00 am to midnight daily Thessaloniki Suburban Railway consists of three lines:

- Line T1 connects Larissa and Thessaloniki, with some trains starting at Palaiofarsalos.
- Line T2 runs between Thessaloniki and Florina, with some trains starting at Edessa.
- Line T3 connects Thessaloniki and Drama, with some trains starting at Serres

Trains run from approximately 6:00 am to 22:00 pm daily on a fairly irregular basis, roughly once an hour. Both lines, however, somewhat complement each other between Thessaloniki and Platy. On 17 July 2014 services were cut back from eight to six services a day from Thessaloniki To Edessa.

Proastiakos routes
Route	Opening	Route	Length	Electric	Top Speed	Stations
Thessaloniki Regional Railway Line T1	7 September 2007 (Litochoro–Thessaloniki) 7 September 2008 (Larissa–Litochoro)	Thessaloniki–Larissa	165.2 km (102.7 mi)	Yes	160 km/h (99 mph)	12
Thessaloniki Regional Railway Line T2	25 January 2008 (Thessaloniki–Edessa) 10 August 2013 (Edessa–Florina)	Thessaloniki–Florina	111.7 km (69.4 mi)	No	120 km/h (75 mph)	17
Thessaloniki Regional Railway Line T3	3 February 2020 (Thessaloniki–Drama)	Thessaloniki–Drama	158.9 km (98.7 mi)	No		20

=== Connections ===
- Thessaloniki: future connection to Thessaloniki Metro

Services towards Larissa also connect to the following long-distance and regional rail services:

- Platy: passengers can transfer to the regional rail service of Western Macedonia (towards Verroia, Edessa, Amyntaio, Florina and Kozani).
- Larissa: passengers can transfer to the mainline and regional rail service as well as trains to Volos.

Services towards Drama also connect to the following long-distance and regional rail services:

- Serres: passengers can transfer to the regional rail service to Central Macedonia (towards Gazoros and Alexandroupoli)

== Patras Suburban Railway ==
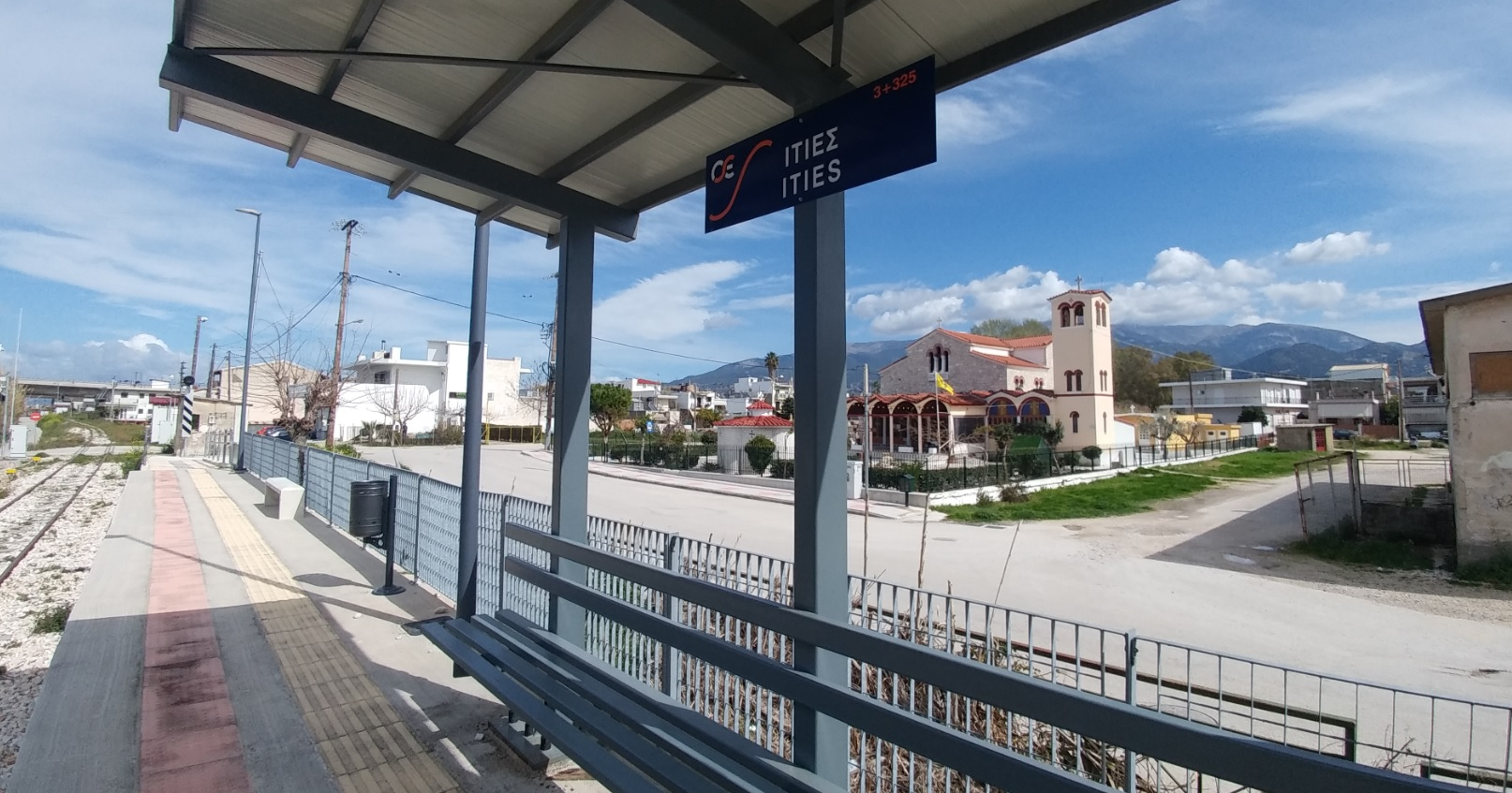
Ities railway station on Line 1, March 2020

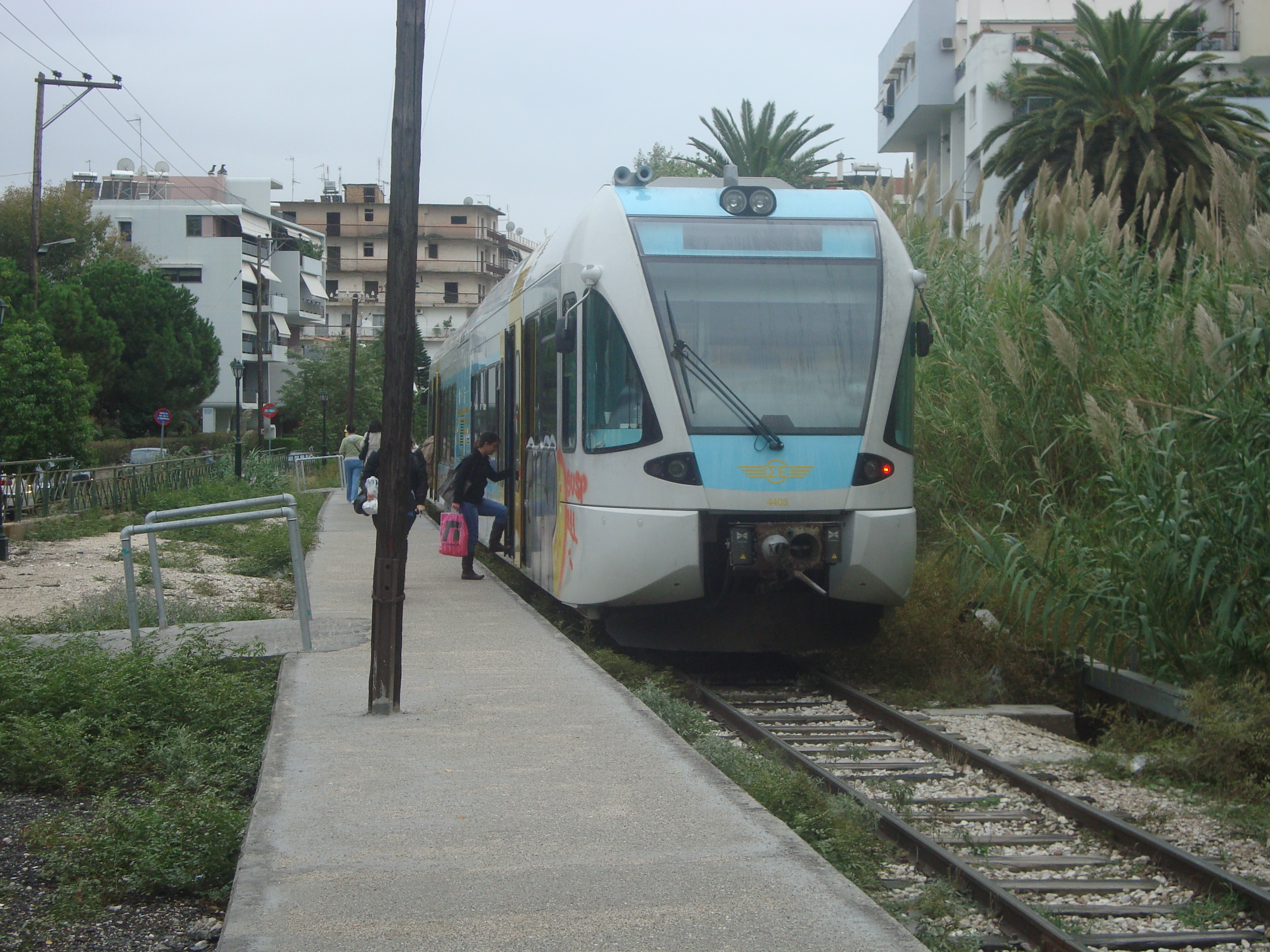
Panachaiki station on Line 2. 2011

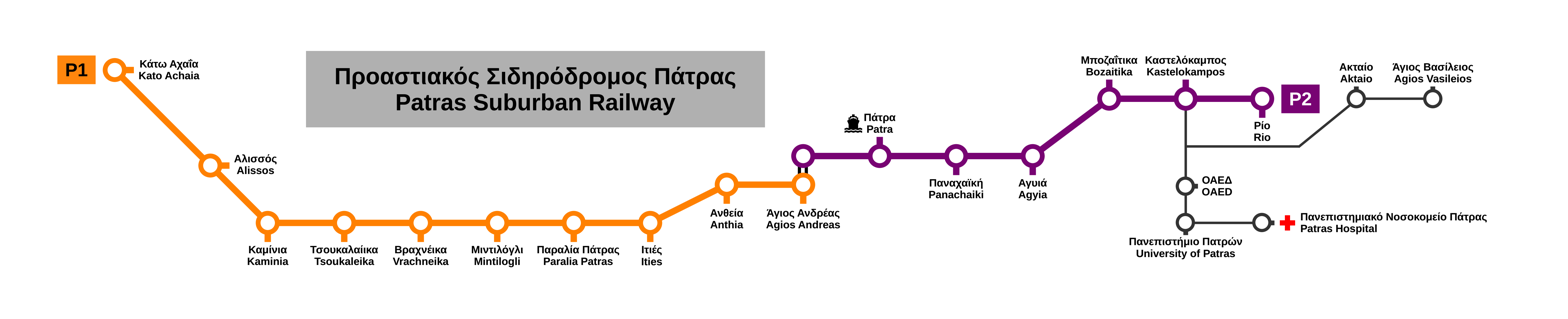
Patras Suburban Railway lines as of March 2024

Suburban railway of Patras consists of two routes. The first route from Agios Andreas station to the eastern suburb of Agios Vasileios began service on July 9, 2010. The route sees high passenger numbers as it serves the University of Patras and densely populated neighbourhoods and suburbs that are poorly served by other means of transport. For that reason, a bus shuttle service runs from Kastellokampos to the General University Hospital of Patras and the University of Patras campus. Trains run hourly from 6:23 in the morning until 23:23 in the evening, on both directions, every day. It serves 8 stations:

- Agios Andreas (Interchange station with the Kato Achaia line)
- Agios Vasileios
- Agyia
- Aktaion
- Bozaitika
- Kastellokampos (bus shuttle to University of Patras and General University Hospital)
- Patras Central Station
- Rio

Due to upgrade works on the Athens - Patras line, the section between Agios Vasileios and Rio has been closed, so trains now terminate at Rio station. However, a bus replacement service from Kastellokampos serves both Aktaion and Agios Vasileios. Plans also have been proposed to bring the section underground in central Patras.

The following table lists the routes and the stations for Patras Suburban services are:

Patras Suburban Railway routes
Route	Opening	First section opened	Latest section opened	Latest station opened	Route	Length	Electric	Top Speed	Stations
P1	29 February 2020				Kato Achaia–Agios Andreas	12.5 km (7.8 mi)	No		10
P2	9 July 2010				Agios Andreas–Rio		No		7

On February 29, 2020, passenger services began on the second route, extending from Agios Andreas all the way to Kato Achaia. The extension runs on part of the old single meter-gauge Patras-Pyrgos line.

In the early phase of operation, trains run from Kato Achaia to Patras Central Station. They will be departing from Patras Central Station every 2 hours from 6:37 to 14:37 and then from Kato Achaia Station every 2 hours from 7:41 to 15:41.

For the first three days of operation (29/02-02/03) the early morning services of 6:37 and 7:41 will not be run, although a back and forth journey at 16:37 to Kato Achaia and at 17:41 to Patras Central Station is going to be run. This special schedule is organised in order to help visitors move around the city and its suburbs during the Patras Carnival going on that weekend.

Although regular passenger service will not see trains running in the evening, it is expected that from May onwards, when the tourist and summer season begins, trains will run hourly back and forth in order to accommodate the increased passenger flows towards the popular summer spots in Western Achaia.

The extension is 22 km long and has 11 stops. These are:

- Patras Central Station
- Agios Andreas (Interchange station with the Rio line)
- Odos Antheias (Antheias Street)
- Ities
- Paralia
- Midilogli
- Vrachneika
- Tsoukaleika(*)
- Kaminia
- Alissos
- Kato Achaia

(*)A bus shuttle service will run from Tsoukaleika to the Patras Industrial Area, serving people who work there.

The total journey time from end to end is around 30 minutes with a top speed of 75 km/h, although the line has the capacity to run at 90 km/h.

Fares

The price for a standard ticket is €1,40(€1 reduced ticket). However, the fare is expected to change after March 2, as a new fare and zone policy will take effect as follows:

Zone A: Rion - Agios Andreas

Zone B: Patras Central/Agios Andreas - Tsoukaleika

Zone C: Tsoukaleika - Kato Achaia

The bus shuttle/replacement services are included in the same ticket. This means passengers do not have to pay more than the standard (or reduced) fare of €1,40 (or €1) to use both the train and the bus.

=== Changes on the Kato Achagia Line (South Sector) ===
Shortly after services started on the line, major changes were made. Bad line enclosure prohibited high speeds (less than 50km/h) on the section from Patras Central to Midilogli station, which in turn made connections between the two lines slow and inefficient. These two factors and poor advertising of the new service did not produce big passenger numbers. The outbreak of the COVID-19 pandemic and the subsequent lockdown imposed made things worse for that line, and shortly after, services were suspended indefinitely.

On July 9, 2020, Proastiakos Patras celebrated its 10th birthday. Five days earlier, on 4th July, after the lockdown was lifted, services on the South sector recommenced, albeit on a shorter route. In order to maximize connection efficiency with the North sector (Rion-Agios Andreas), the route was altered to service the section between Agios Andreas and Kaminia. Alissos and Kato Achagia stations remain inactive to this day. However, works on safeguarding the line have been since going on, with new fences surrounding the line on key parts where it is otherwise problematic. When works are finished, it is expected that trains will reach speeds of 50km/h between Agios Andreas and Midilogli, the section on where such speeds were previously prohibited. This increase in speed should allow trains to reach the original terminus in Kato Achagia in less than 30 minutes, reinstating the original extension with a more than reliable, fast, and efficient connection with Patras and the North sector of the system.

The new service from Agios Andreas to Kaminia saw trains initially run hourly from 6:30 till 15:00. On October 10, the timetables changed and trains are since running hourly again, from 6:30 till 18:00.

The fare system has changed, too, as the previously mentioned 3-zone fare policy was suspended indefinitely. Both lines are a single fare zone. The standard fare is €1,40, and the reduced fare is €1.00.

== Rolling stock ==
Proastiakos uses rolling stock owned by GAIAOSE and maintained by Hellenic Train. Currently multiple units are used almost exclusively. Siemens Desiro 5-car electric multiple units (EMU) are used in the Athens and Thessaloniki networks, while Stadler GTW-2/6 and MAN-2000 diesel two-car multiple units (DMU-2) are used for the Patras network, as well as unelectrified stretches of the Thessaloniki network, respectively. As these DMUs have limited passenger carrying capacity, two or three DMUs are coupled together, when rolling stock availability allows it.

In late 2020 however, TrainOSE announced plans to purchase new rolling stock which will consist of double decker EMU's, preferably from the Italian market.

In December 2025, Hellenic Train secured a €393 million contract with Alstom for 23 Coradia Stream EMUs, 11 of which are to be implemented on services in the Athens and Thessaloniki networks, as well as 10 years of maintenance. The first units are expected to enter service within the second trimester of 2027.

Train	Area	Image
Siemens Desiro	Athens; Thessaloniki	
Stadler GTW-2/6	Patras	
MAN 2000	Thessaloniki	
Alstom Coradia (from 2027)	Athens; Thessaloniki	

== Fares ==
Standard tickets (€1,20), valid on all urban buses and trains, are also valid on Proastiakos trains between Piraeus, SKA, Koropi and Magoula. Higher fares apply for travel to the Airport, between Magoula and Kiato; and between Thessaloniki and Larisa. A one-way ticket from Piraeus or central Athens to the Airport costs €9 and a return ticket €16.

Tickets must be validated on special ticket validation machines on the platform, before boarding the train. Return tickets must be re-validated before boarding a return train. There are no ticket validation machines on the trains.

== Future plans ==
Addition of new routes and stations to Proastiakos services depends on the progress of a number of OSE infrastructure projects in Attica. The most important projects are:

- Construction of a three or four-track line between Rouf and SKA stations.
- Electrification of lines between Piraeus and SKA.
- Installation of signalling on lines between Piraeus and SKA.
- Construction of ten passenger platforms and one "through track" at Athens Central station.
- Construction of new stations at Tavros, Pyrgos Vasilissis, Lykotrypa, and Zevgolatio.

As of April 2011, the introduction of new and more frequent services is mainly hindered by limited line capacity between Rouf and SKA, and limited availability of diesel rolling stock for the non-electrified line.

=== Section: Piraeus – S.K.A. ===
A number of new stations and halts are under construction on this line and they shall be served by Proastiakos trains:

- Athens (Athens Central Railway Station): The station is extended with new platforms to serve future suburban services. Completed as of August 2017.
- Agioi Anargyroi: New four platform station served by mainline and suburban trains, plus a freight siding. The fast line platforms are already operational and are served by Suburban Railway and Athens-Chalkis trains. The slow lines are under construction.
- Pyrgos Vasilissis: Is open after the slow lines between Agioi Anargyroi and SKA are operational.
- Kato Acharnai: Is open after the slow lines between Agioi Anargyroi and SKA are operational.
- Acharnai Railway Center (SKA): The station is partly open since 2011-04-05, extensive work is still required to finish the first phase of the complex.

=== Section: SKA – Koropi - Lavrio ===
The extension to Lavrio will mostly follow the alignment of the old Athens to Lavrio metric gauge line, which closed to passengers in 1957 and to goods in 1962. Most of the old alignment is still intact, and several bridges, all station buildings as well as the tracks themselves on many locations, are still in situ, but will need to be replaced as they were designed for a single metric gauge line, while the new one will be standard gauge and double-track for most of its length. The new line will branch off the airport line just beyond Koropi station, where existing infrastructure for a possible extension is already in place.

New stations will be built at:

- Markopoulo
- Kalyvia
- Kouvaras
- Keratea
- Kalopigado
- Thoriko
- Lavrio
- Port of Lavrio

or near the same site as their predecessors, the buildings of which, most of them listed structures, will hopefully be preserved. The line will be electrified upon inauguration.

=== Section: SKA – Pallini - Rafina ===
Future services to Rafina will be on new lines, currently securing funds. The line to Rafina shall branch off after Pallini station and will partly run on the central reservation of the Hymittus Ring Road. The stations will be:

- Pikermi
- Kallitechnoupoli
- Rafina

=== Section: SKA – Corinth / Kiato / Aigio / Patras / Loutraki ===
The existing line to Kiato has been extended to Aigio. The extension to Patras is under construction. A branch line to Loutraki is under construction.

- Zefyri: A new station to serve a future sports center.
- Xylokastro: New station with two platforms and pass-through line.
- Aigio: New station with three platforms.
- Loutraki branch:
  - Isthmos
  - Loutraki

=== Section: SKA – Halkida / Thiva ===
These stations are on the existing mainline and are served by regional and mainline trains. They shall be served by Proastiakos suburban trains in the future, when electrification and adequate line capacity are available between Athens and SKA.

- Acharnai Railway Center (SKA)
- Acharnes
- Dekeleia
- Agios Stefanos
- Afidnes
- Sfendali
- Avlonas
- Agios Thomas
- Oinofyta
- Oinoi, Junction to Chalkis (Oinoi–Chalcis railway)
  - Kalochori-Panteichi
  - Avlis
  - Steno
  - Halkida
- Tanagra
- Elaion
- Ypaton
- Thiva

== See also ==
- Hellenic Train
- Transport for Athens
