= Piraeus–Patras railway =

Railway in Greece

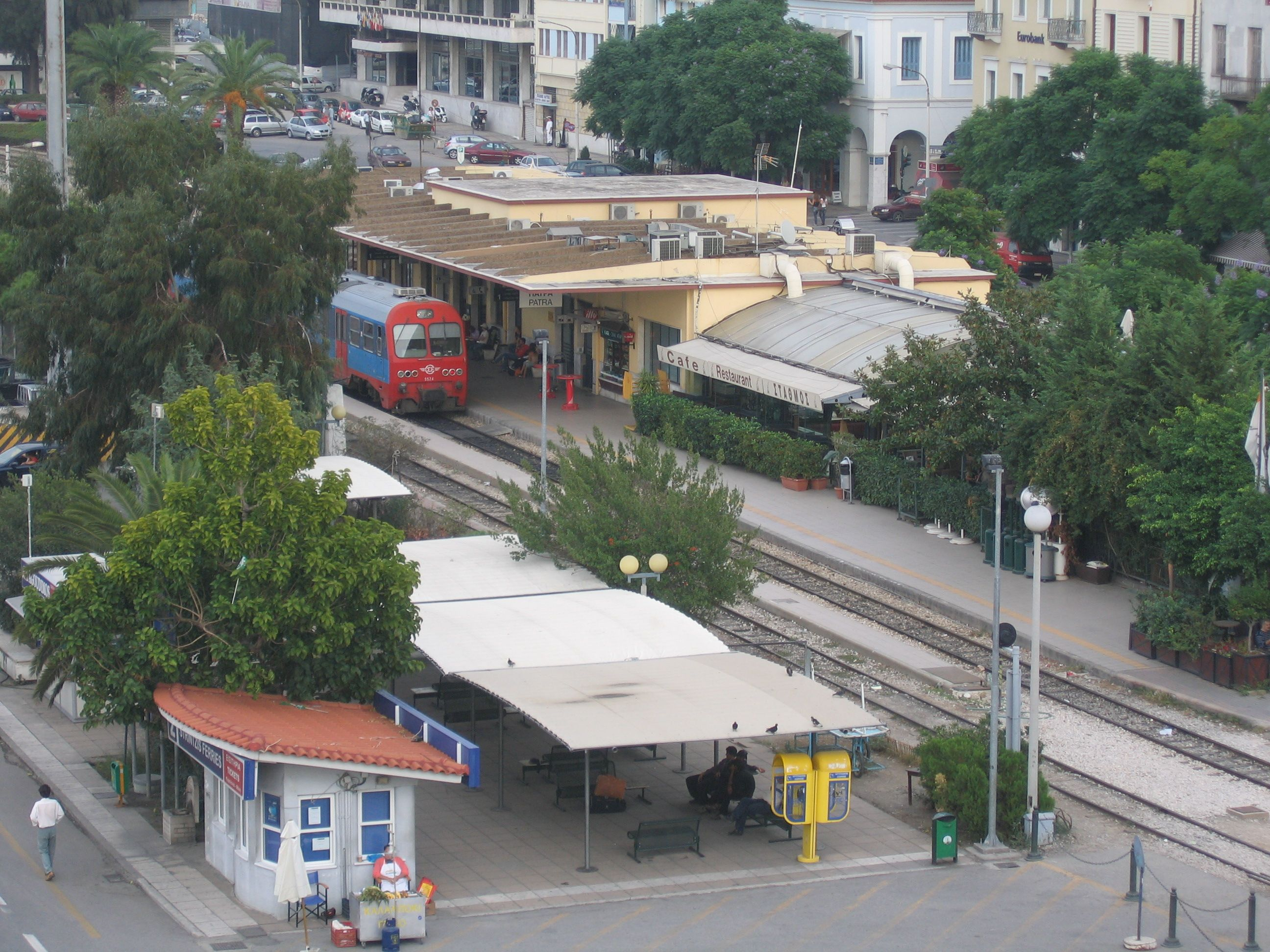
- Patras railway station, October 2007

Overview
- Status: Mostly closed
- Owner: OSE
- Locale: Greece (Attica, Peloponnese, West Greece)
- Termini: Agioi Anargyroi 38.0297°N 23.7180°E; Patras 38.2498°N 21.7351°E

Service
- Operator(s): Hellenic Train

Technical
- Line length: 230 km (140 mi)
- Number of tracks: Single track, Agioi Anargyroi–Eleusis double track
- Track gauge: 1,000 mm (3 ft 3 3/8 in) metre gauge
- Electrification: no

The railway from Piraeus to Patras was a 230-kilometre-long (140 mi) metre-gauge railway line in Greece that connected the port of Athens, Piraeus with Patras in the Peloponnese peninsula, via Athens "Peloponnese" central station and Corinth. It was opened between 1884 and 1887. Formerly one of the main lines of the Greek railway network, it has now largely fallen into disuse. It has mostly been replaced by the Athens Airport–Patras railway, a new standard-gauge line whose first section opened in 2004 and which remains under construction between Aigio and Patras. The 13 km (8.1 mi) section between Piraeus and Agioi Anargyroi, a northern suburb of Athens, has since been removed and replaced by the corresponding section of the upgraded Piraeus–Platy railway. As of 2020, the only sections in operation are the 22.5 km (14.0 mi) section between Agioi Anargyroi and Eleusis, and the 7.3 km (4.5 mi) section between Rio and Patras.

== Main stations ==
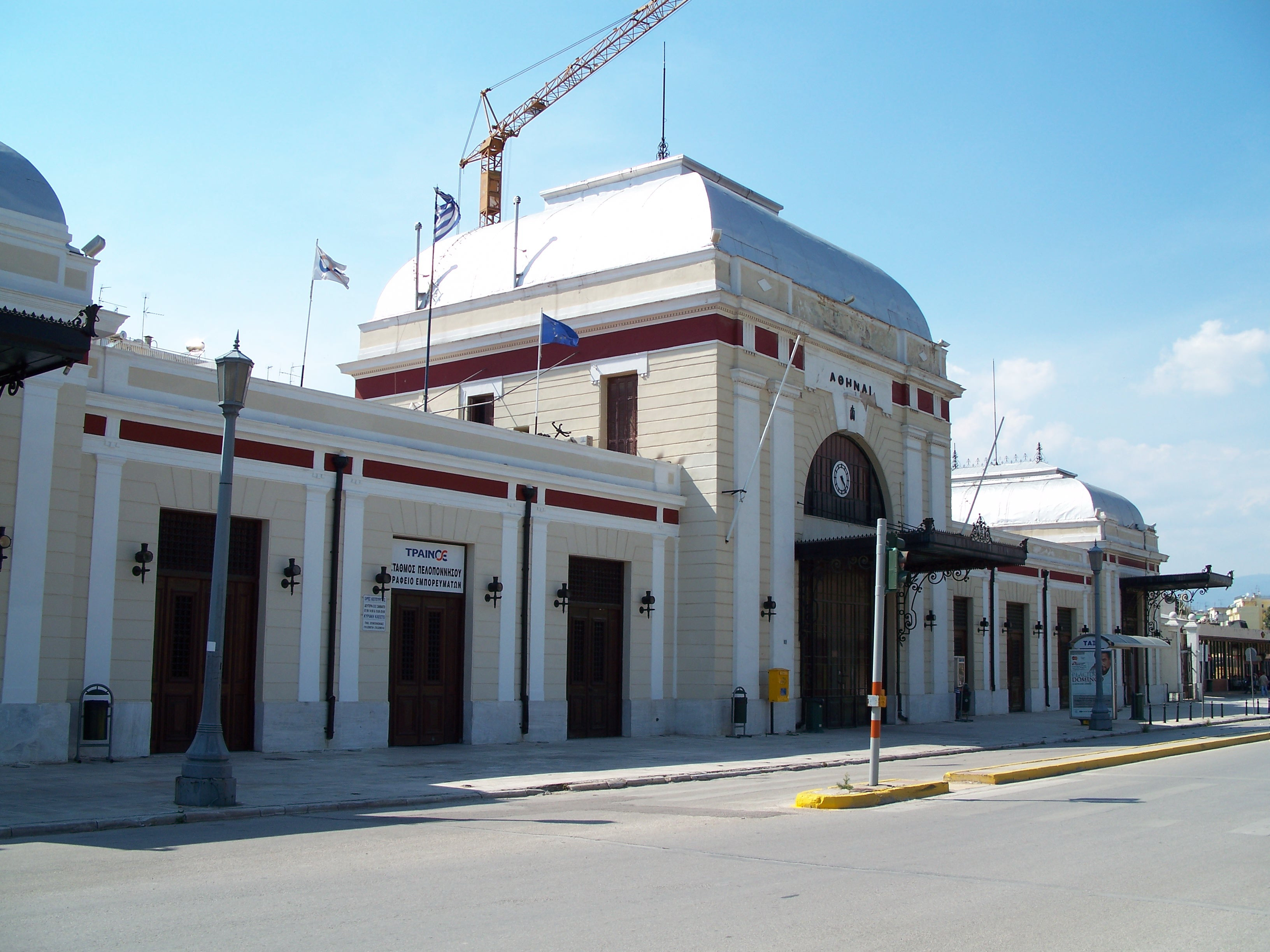
Athens Peloponnese railway station

The main stations on the Piraeus–Patras railway were:

- Piraeus Peloponnese
- Athens Peloponnese
- Corinth
- Patras
- Rio

== Services ==
Since 2009, services have ceased on most of the Piraeus–Patras railway. The only remaining passenger service is Line 1 of the Proastiakos (commuter rail) service between Rio and Patras. The final section of Line 1, between Patras and Agios Andreas, and the entirety of Line 2, between Agios Andreas and Kato Achaia, operate on the adjacent Patras–Kyparissia railway.
