= Agios Andreas railway station =

Railway station in the Peloponnese, Greece

Άγιος Ανδρέας Agios Andreas
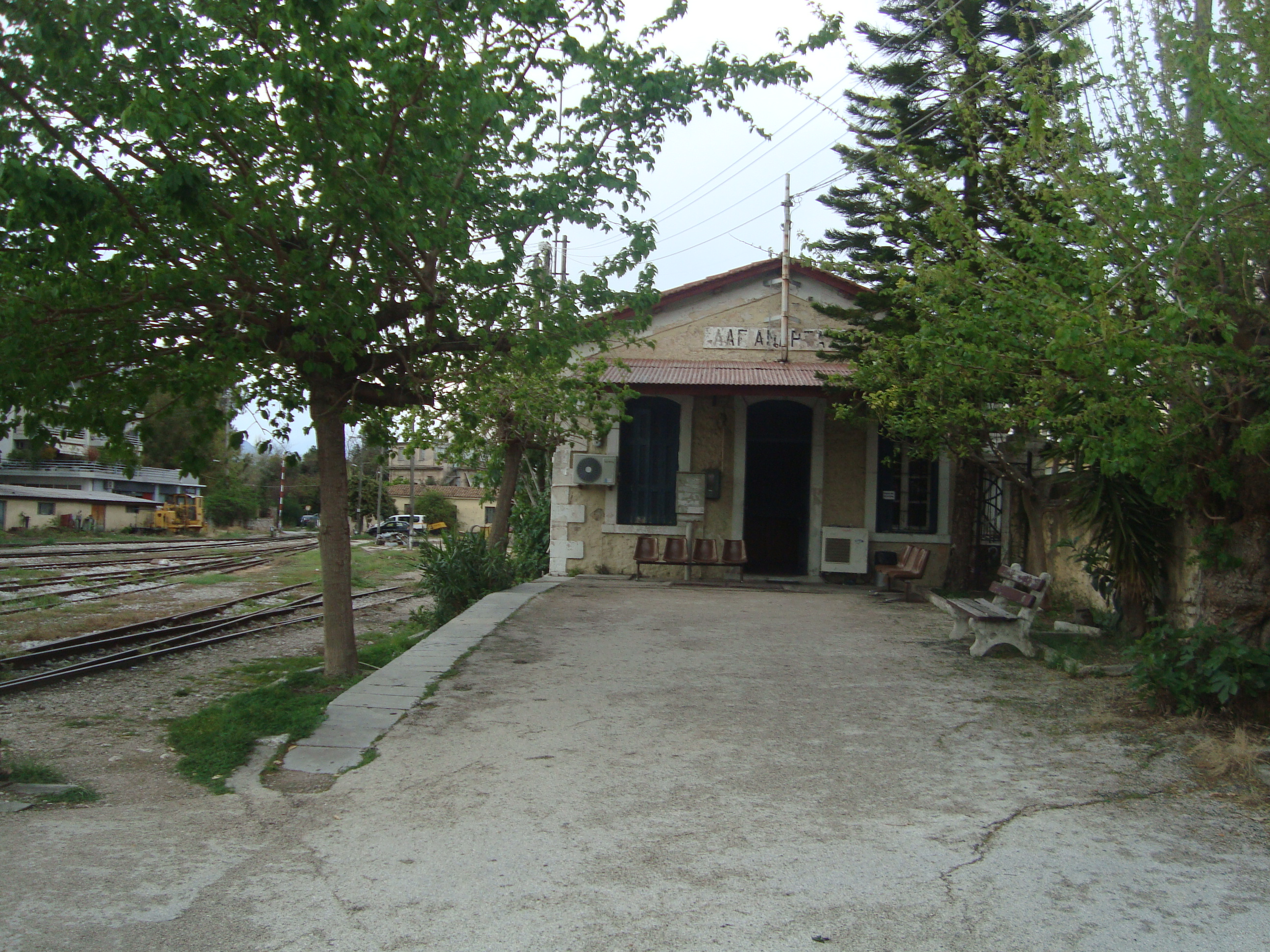
- Agios Andreas railway station old booking office, April 2016

General information
- Location: 262 22 Patras; Patras; Greece
- Coordinates: 38°08′33″N 21°26′02″E
- Owner: GAIAOSE
- Manager: Hellenic Train
- Line: Patras–Kyparissia railway
- Platforms: 2 (Island)
- Tracks: 1
- Train operators: Hellenic Train

Construction
- Structure type: at-grade
- Platform levels: 1
- Parking: Yes
- Cycle facilities: No

Other information
- Status: Unstaffed
- Fare zone: A (A1) & B
- Website: http://www.ose.gr/en/

History
- Former names: Pyrgos Station

Key dates
- 15 September 1888: Opened
- 2005: Closed to passengers
- 9 July 2010: Reopened (Line P1)
- 29 February 2020: Suburban Railway Line 2 opened

Services
Preceding station	Suburban Rail	Following station
Anthia towards Kato Achaia	Line P1	Terminus
Terminus	Line P2	Patras towards Rio
Former services
SPAP
Vrachnaiika	Patras–Kyparissia railway	Patras Terminus
Location

Agios Andreas railway station (Greek: Σιδηροδρομικός σταθμός Άγιος Ανδρέας, romanized: Sidirodromikos Stathmos Agios Andreas) is a railway station in Kato Achaia in the northwestern Peloponnese, Greece. The station is on the former Patras–Kyparissia line However Since the suspension of regional services on the metre-gauge railways of the Peloponnese in 2011, the station is used only by local Proastiakos trains, served by Proastiakos Patras P1 & P2 Services.

== History ==
The station was opened in December 1887 as Pyrgos Station and was the second railway station built in of the city after the then central one of Agios Dionysios. The two stations were initially open-air and were not connected by a railway line. The line to connect them passed through the centre of the city and was built in 1888, after disputes from residents and a change of design. In the same year, the construction of the railway line to Pyrgos continued, up to Kato Achaia, and its operation began in December 1888, as well as the official operation of the station. In fact, the first route was made on 15 December 1888. Until the union of the lines Patras-Athens and Patras-Pyrgos, through the centre of the city, the station of Agios Andreas was the central station of the city to Pyrgos. Later it was connected to the now inactive Patras-Kyparissia metric railway line.

In 1970 OSE became the legal successor to the SEK, taking over responsibilities for most of Greece's rail infrastructure. On 1 January 1971, the station and most of Greek rail infrastructure were transferred to the Hellenic Railways Organisation S.A., a state-owned corporation. Freight traffic declined sharply when the state-imposed monopoly of OSE for the transport of agricultural products and fertilisers ended in the early 1990s. Many small stations of the network with little passenger traffic were closed down.

In 2005 operations from the station were suspended due to the reconstruction works of the OSE railway network in the region. In 2009, with the Greek debt crisis unfolding OSE's Management was forced to reduce services across the network. Timetables were cut back, and routes closed as the government-run entity attempted to reduce overheads. However in the station reopened on 9 July 2010 as part of the Proastiakos Patras service to Kato Achaia. In 2017 OSE's passenger transport sector was privatised as TrainOSE, currently, a wholly owned subsidiary of Ferrovie dello Stato Italiane infrastructure, including stations, remained under the control of OSE.

On 29 February 2020, service's recommenced from the station to Rio. With the reconnection of Patras to Athens planned for 2025, Agios Andreas will be a connecting station of the line to Pyrgos. Service were suspended due to the coronavirus pandemic, becoming the starting point of (what would be) the new Line P1 of the Suburban Railway to the town of Kato Achaia. With the resumption of services on 4 July 2020, it was replaced as the starting point of northern leg of service by Agios Andreas. On 1 August 2023, line numbers were introduced on the Patras–Kyparissia railway, With Agios Andreas becoming an interchanged between P1 & P2 services.

== Facilities ==
The station is still housed in the original 19th-century brick-built station building; however, as of (2023) the station is unstaffed, with no staffed booking office and is rundown. There are no waiting rooms, however the platforms have shelters and seating. There are no Dot-matrix display departure and arrival screens or timetable poster boards on the platforms.

== Services ==
Since 1 August 2023, when line numbers were introduced, the following weekday services call at this station:

- Patras Suburban Railway Line P1 towards Kato Achaia, with one train every two hours from 07:00 to 17:00.
- Patras Suburban Railway Line P2 towards Rio, The trains run every hour daily, from 6:23 in the morning until 23:23 in the evening. Rail services are provided by OSE trains (Stadler GTW 2/6 diesel two-car units).

Bus route 301 & 302 call at the nearest bus stop, on Maizonos. Agios Andreas, has two bus connections at Kastellokampos: one for Agios Vasileios, and another for the General University Hospital of Patras via the University of Patras.

== Station layout ==
L Ground/Concourse	Customer service	Tickets/Exits
Level; Ε1		Out of use
Level; Ε1	Platform 1	P1 towards Kato Achaia (Anthia) ←
Level; Ε1	Island platform, doors will open on the right
Level; Ε1	Platform 2	P2 towards Rio (Patras) →
