= Kato Achaia railway station =

Railway station of Patras in the Peloponnese, Greece

Κάτω Αχαΐα Kato Achaia
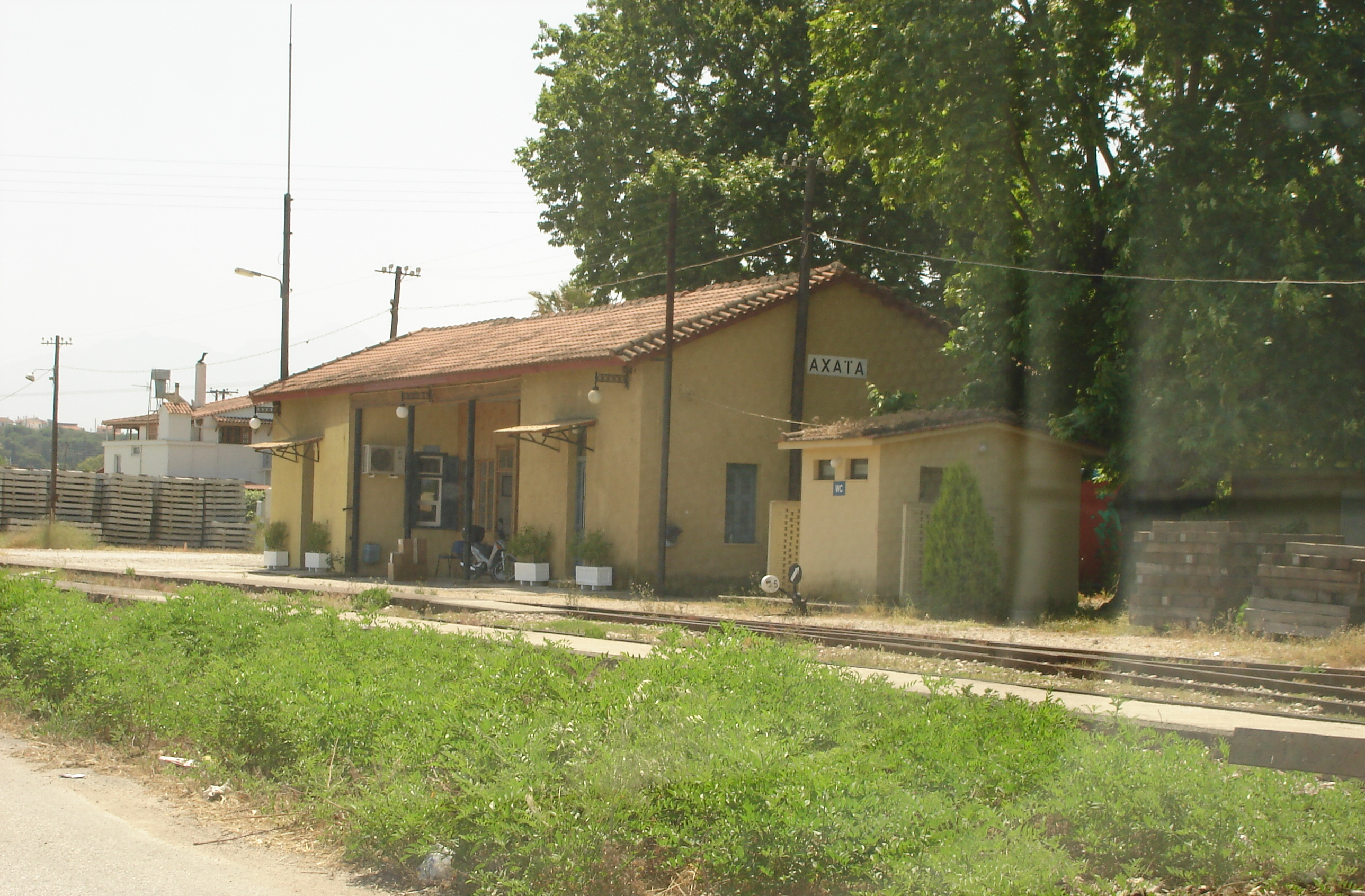
- Kato Achaia railway station, May 2008

General information
- Location: 252 00 Kato Achaia; Greece
- Coordinates: 38°08′45″N 21°33′39″E
- Owner: GAIAOSE
- Operator: Hellenic Train
- Manager: Hellenic Train
- Line: Patras–Kyparissia railway
- Platforms: 2 side platforms
- Tracks: 1
- Train operators: Hellenic Train

Construction
- Structure type: at-grade
- Platform levels: 1
- Parking: Yes
- Cycle facilities: No

Other information
- Fare zone: A (A1)
- Website: http://www.ose.gr/en/

History
- Opened: 15 December 1888; 137 years ago
- Rebuilt: 29 February 2020; 6 years ago (Line P1)

Services
Preceding station	Suburban Rail	Following station
Terminus	Line P1	Alissos towards Agios Andreas
Location

Kato Achaia railway station (Greek: Σιδηροδρομικός σταθμός Κάτω Αχαΐας, romanized: Sidirodromikos Stathmos Kato Achaias) is a railway station in Kato Achaia in the northwestern Peloponnese, Greece. The station is on the former Patras–Kyparissia line and is served by Proastiakos Patras Services.

== History ==
The station opened in December 1888 as Achaia railway station and was the westward terminus of the line from Patras, until a year later, the line was extended to Pyrgos. With the cancellation of the routes of the Patras-Kyparissia metric railway line, its facilities remained inactive.

In 1970 OSE became the legal successor to the SEK, taking over responsibilities for most of Greece's rail infrastructure. On 1 January 1971, the station and most of Greek rail infrastructure were transferred to the Hellenic Railways Organisation S.A., a state-owned corporation. Freight traffic declined sharply when the state-imposed monopoly of OSE for the transport of agricultural products and fertilisers ended in the early 1990s. Many small stations of the network with little passenger traffic were closed down. In 2005 operations from the station were suspended due to the reconstruction works of the OSE railway network in the region. In 2009, with the Greek debt crisis unfolding OSE's Management was forced to reduce services across the network. Timetables were cut back, and routes closed as the government-run entity attempted to reduce overheads. The station reopened on 9 July 2010 as part of the Proastiakos Patras services, served by trains between Agios Andreas and Agios Vassilios stations. Since the suspension of regional services on the metre-gauge railways of the Peloponnese in 2011, the station is used only by local Proastiakos trains which currently connect the city with the suburbs of Rio and Kaminia. In 2017 OSE's passenger transport sector was privatised as TrainOSE, currently, a wholly owned subsidiary of Ferrovie dello Stato Italiane infrastructure, including stations, remained under the control of OSE.

It reopened on 29 February 2020 as a terminal station when Line P1 of the Patras Suburban Railway began operating with the extension of its routes to the town of Kato Achaia Due to the abandonment of the adjacent old station building, Line P1 services started with the (temporary) solution of using a pre-facility which includes chemical toilets. It serves both Kato Achaia and the nearby settlements, villages and areas, as well as the broader area of Western Achaia. It is located at the junction of the PEO Patras-Pyrgos roads and the Kato Achaias-Arlas provincial road.

Service were suspended due to the coronavirus pandemic, becoming the starting point of the new Line P1 of the Suburban Railway to the town of Kato Achaia. With the resumption of services on 4 July 2020, it was replaced as the starting point of Line P1 by Agios Andreas.

The station also serves as the starting point of the TRAINOSE bus services that connect Patras with Aigio and Kiato via Diakoptos, where the starting point of Odontotos is located. The railway response takes place at these three stations with the Athens Suburban Railway. The trains of the latter run on the line Airport-Patras, the construction of which has been completed to Rododafni Achaia.

== Facilities ==
The station has toilets but is unstaffed.

Within a few meters distance from the station, there is the Patras Railway Museum open-air showroom which hosts a very old locomotive of the Piraeus, Athens and Peloponnese Railways (SPAP) No. Zs 7.532

== Services ==
Since 1 August 2023, when line numbers were introduced, Kato Achaia is served by Line P1 of the Patras Suburban Railway towards Agios Andreas, with one train every two hours from 07:00 to 17:00. Line P2, accessible via Agios Andreas, has two bus connections at Kastellokampos: one for Agios Vasileios, and another for the General University Hospital of Patras via the University of Patras.
