= Kastellokampos =

Kastellokampos Καστελλόκαμπος
- Settlement
- Location within Greece
- Coordinates: 38°17.5′N 21°46.2′E
- Country: Greece
- Administrative region: West Greece
- Regional unit: Achaea
- Municipality: Patras
- Municipal unit: Patras
- Time zone: UTC+2 (EET)
  - Summer (DST): UTC+3 (EEST)
- Postal code: 265 00
- Area code: 2160
- Vehicle registration: AX

Kastellokampos (Greek: Καστελλόκαμπος, meaning "plain with a castle") is a neighbourhood of the city of Patras, Achaea, Greece. It has been part of the municipality of Patras since 1879. It is situated on the Gulf of Patras coast, 6 km north of the city centre of Patras and 1.5 km southwest of Rio. The population is between 2,000 and 3,000. The river Charadros flows into the sea in Kastellokampos. The A5 motorway passes east of the neighbourhood. Kastellokampos has a station on the Piraeus–Patras railway, served by Proastiakos suburban rail.

== Population ==
Year	Population
1950s	200 to 300
1981	around 1,000
1991	1,500 to 1,700
2001	2,000 to 3,000
