= Agios Andreas, Patras =

Neighborhood of Patras, Greece

Coordinates: 38.24207°N 21.72943°E

Agios Andreas (Greek: Άγιος Ανδρέας, meaning "Saint Andrew") is a neighbourhood in the south-central part of the city of Patras, 2 km from the downtown core. Agios Andreas is linked with the Akti Dymaion, part of the EO9 road between Patras and Pyrgos, and Korinthou Street. The OSE's SPAP line is 300 m from the old shoreline and 500 m from the new shoreline by the expanded Port of Patras.

== Nearest subdivisions ==
- Tsivdi, north

== Streets ==
- Agiou Andreou Street (local and two-way)
- Akti Dymaion and the EO9 (Patras–Pyrgos–Methoni)
- Korinthou Street
- Maizonos Street
- Papaflessa Street
- Trion Navarchon Street

== Geography ==
The area is made up of residential homes all over the area, except for the western part where there are several supermarkets and a cinema and trees by the old coastline. Westward is the proposed cargo section of the Port of Patras and several playgrounds. Houses are mainly eight stories tall. Its total area is approximately 2 to 3 km^{2} and 1 to 1.5 km in length from west to east and 1 km in width from north to south. Its total street length is approximately 20 km of which 4 km are main streets, the rest are residential.

== History ==
The area used to be farmlands, until the early-20th century when the area saw housing expansion with neoclassical buildings and paved streets. The population grew later on. After World War II and the Greek Civil War, the area saw taller buildings as high as eight stories tall and neoclassical buildings are more rarely seen. A supermarket was added later on in the 1990s and later, a cinema was added. More land was added to the west and in the early-2000s the Port of Patras expanded southward.
