= Patras–Kyparissia railway =

Railway line in Greece

Coordinates: 37.8043°N 21.3435°E

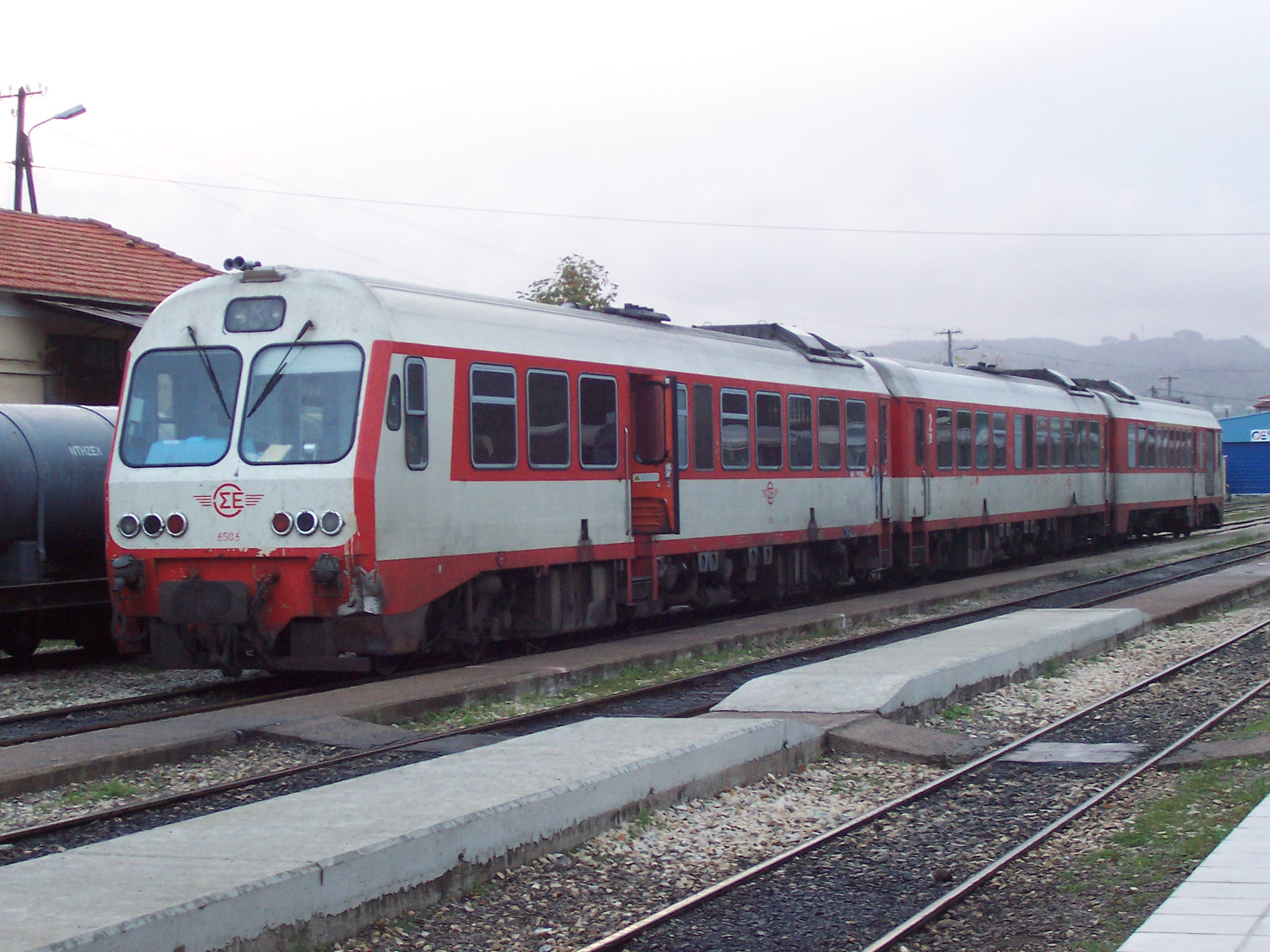
- 6501 series DMU at Pyrgos railway station (2007)

Overview
- Owner: OSE
- Locale: Greece (Attica, Peloponnese, West Greece)
- Termini: Patras railway station; Kyparissia railway station

Service
- Operator(s): Hellenic Train

History
- Opened: 1888
- Closed: 2011 (Partially)

Technical
- Line length: 163 km (101 mi) (Nov 2019)
- Number of tracks: Single-track
- Track gauge: 1,000 mm (3 ft 3 3/8 in)
- Electrification: no

The Patras–Kyparissia railway (Greek: Σιδηροδρομική Γραμμή Πάτρας - Κυπαρισσίας) is a railway line of the OSE in Achaea, Elis, and Messenia, southwestern Greece. This 163 km (101 mi) long single track metre-gauge line connects Patras, Pyrgos and Kyparissia.

== Connections ==
The Patras–Kyparissia railway is connected to the following other railway lines:

- at Patras to the Piraeus–Patras railway
- at Kavasila to the (abandoned) Kavasila–Kyllini railway
- at Pyrgos to Katakolo
- at Alfeios to Olympia
- at Kalo Nero to Zevgolateio

There was a ferry connection from Patras to Kryoneri, the southern terminus of the (now abandoned) railway line to Missolonghi and Agrinio.

== History ==
Construction of the line was started in May 1887. The first section from Patras to Kato Achaia was opened in 1888, and to Pyrgos in 1890. Kyparissia was reached in 1902. Since January 2011, passenger traffic on most of the line has been suspended.

== Current use ==
Currently, only two sections of the railway are in use:

- Patras–Agios Andreas (as part of the Patras suburban railway)
- Pyrgos–Alfeios (tourist trains from Katakolo to Olympia)
