= Kato Achaia =

Kato Achaia Κάτω Αχαΐα
- Community
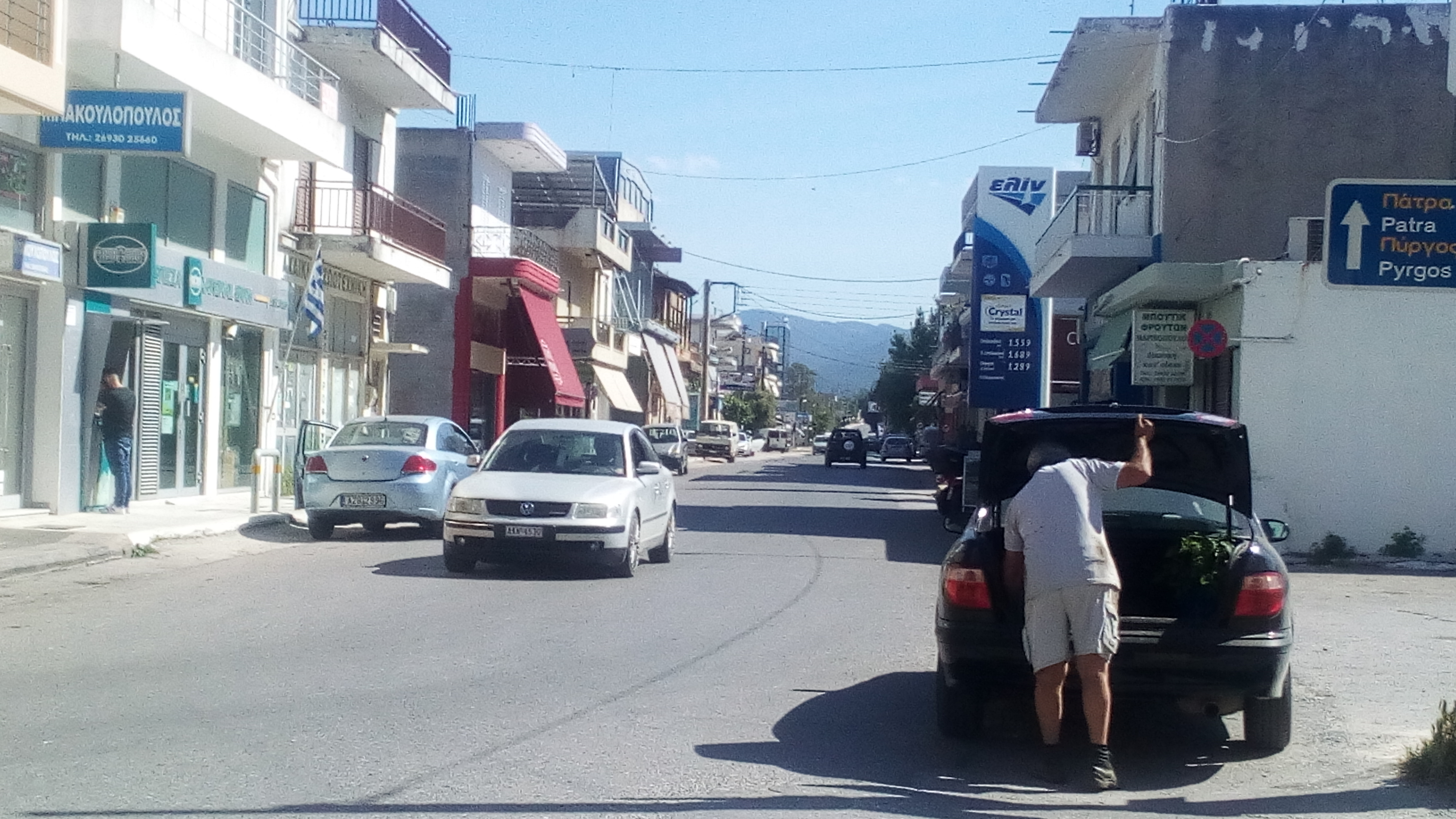
- Kato Achaia main road

- Location within Greece
- Coordinates: 38°9′N 21°33′E
- Country: Greece
- Administrative region: West Greece
- Regional unit: Achaea
- Municipality: West Achaea
- Municipal unit: Dymi

Population (2021)
  - Community: 8,177
- Time zone: UTC+2 (EET)
  - Summer (DST): UTC+3 (EEST)
- Vehicle registration: AX

Kato Achaia (Greek: Κάτω Αχαΐα) is a town and a community in Achaea, West Greece, Greece. Since the 2011 local government reform it is part of the municipality West Achaea, of which it is the seat of administration. The community Kato Achaia consists of the town Kato Achaia and the villages Alykes, Manetaiikia, Paralia Kato Achaias and Piso Sykea. Nearby are the ruins of the ancient city of Dyme.

Kato Achaia is located 1 km (0.6 mi) south of the Gulf of Patras and 20 km (12 mi) southwest of Patras. The villages Alykes and Paralia Kato Achaias are on the coast. The Greek National Road 9 (Patras - Pyrgos) passes outside the town. Kato Achaia has a train station on the partly disused Patras–Pyrgos railway. Currently, train traffic is somewhat offered through the Patras Suburban Railway between Rio-Patras and Kaminia, while the last stretch of the journey is made by buses ran by Hellenic Train, that make two stops at the two temporarily offline stations of Alissos and Kato Achaia. In the future, the railway will restart operations towards Pyrgos and also provide connection with the Intercity Railway network.

== Population history ==
| Year | Kato Achaia Town | Community |
|---|---|---|
| 1981 | 5,185 | - |
| 1991 | 4,947 | - |
| 2001 | 5,518 | 6,027 |
| 2011 | 6,618 | 6,880 |
| 2021 | 7,689 | 8,177 |

== Gallery ==
Dymi (Kato Achaia) municipal unit

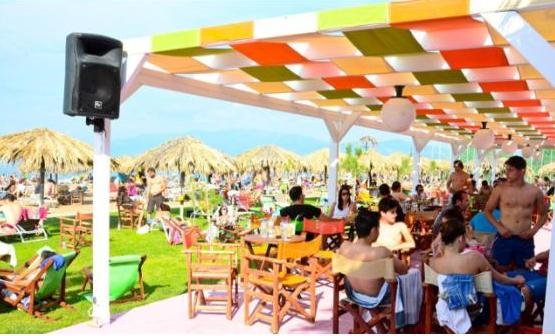
Kato Achaia beach

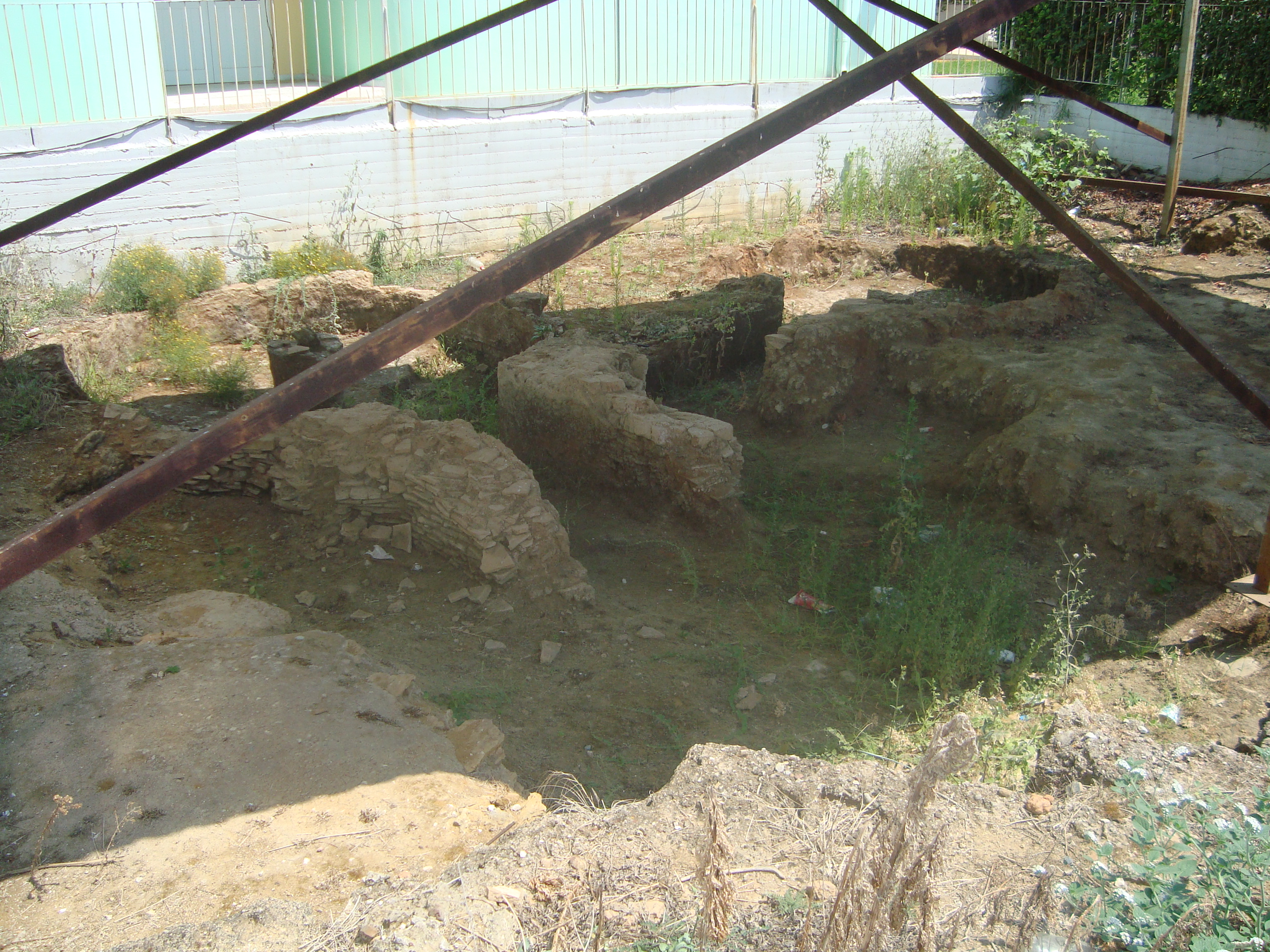
Roman archaeological findings in kato Achaia

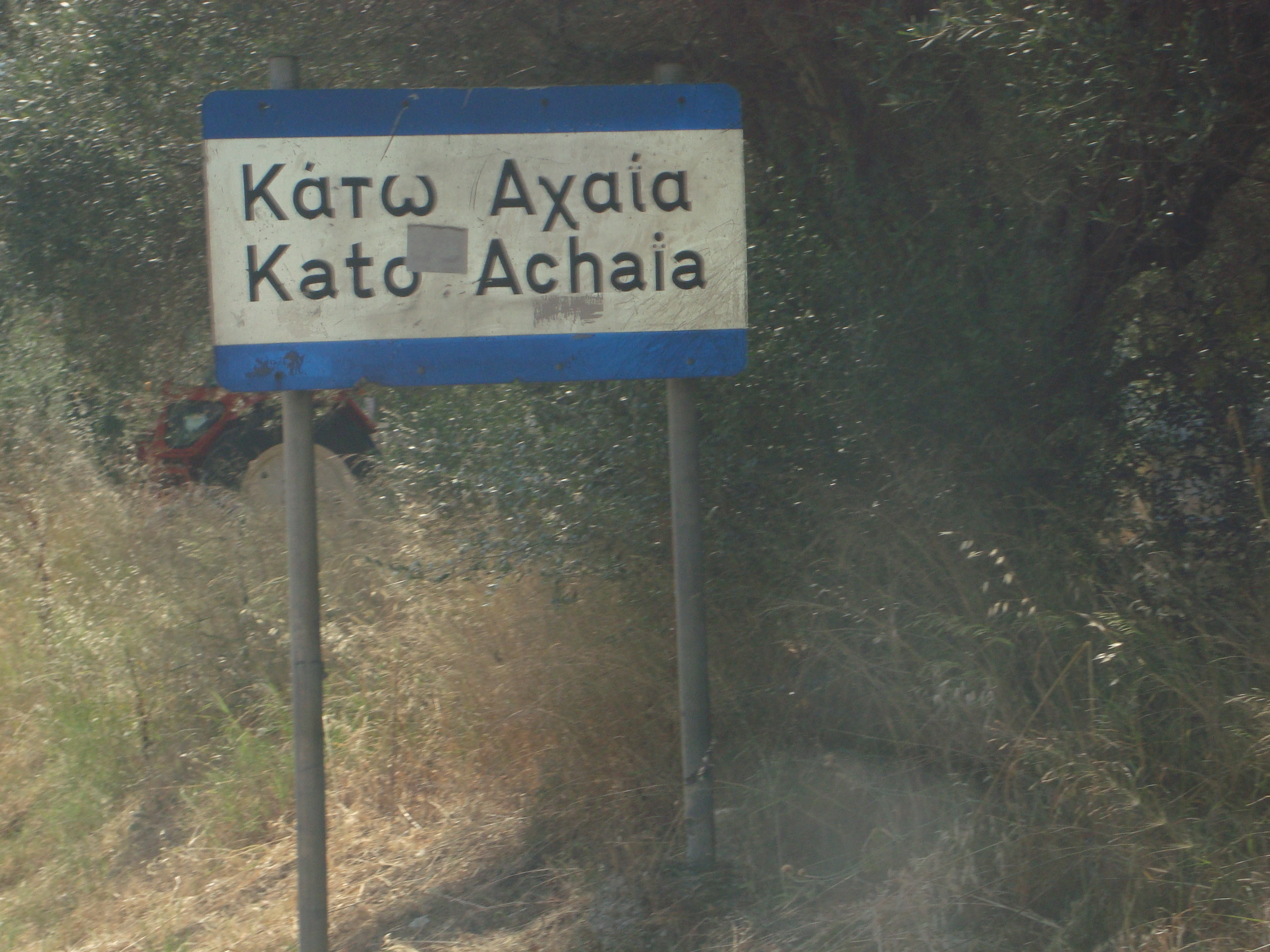
Kato Achaia
