= Agios Vasileios, Achaea =

Agios Vasileios Άγιος Βασίλειος
- Community
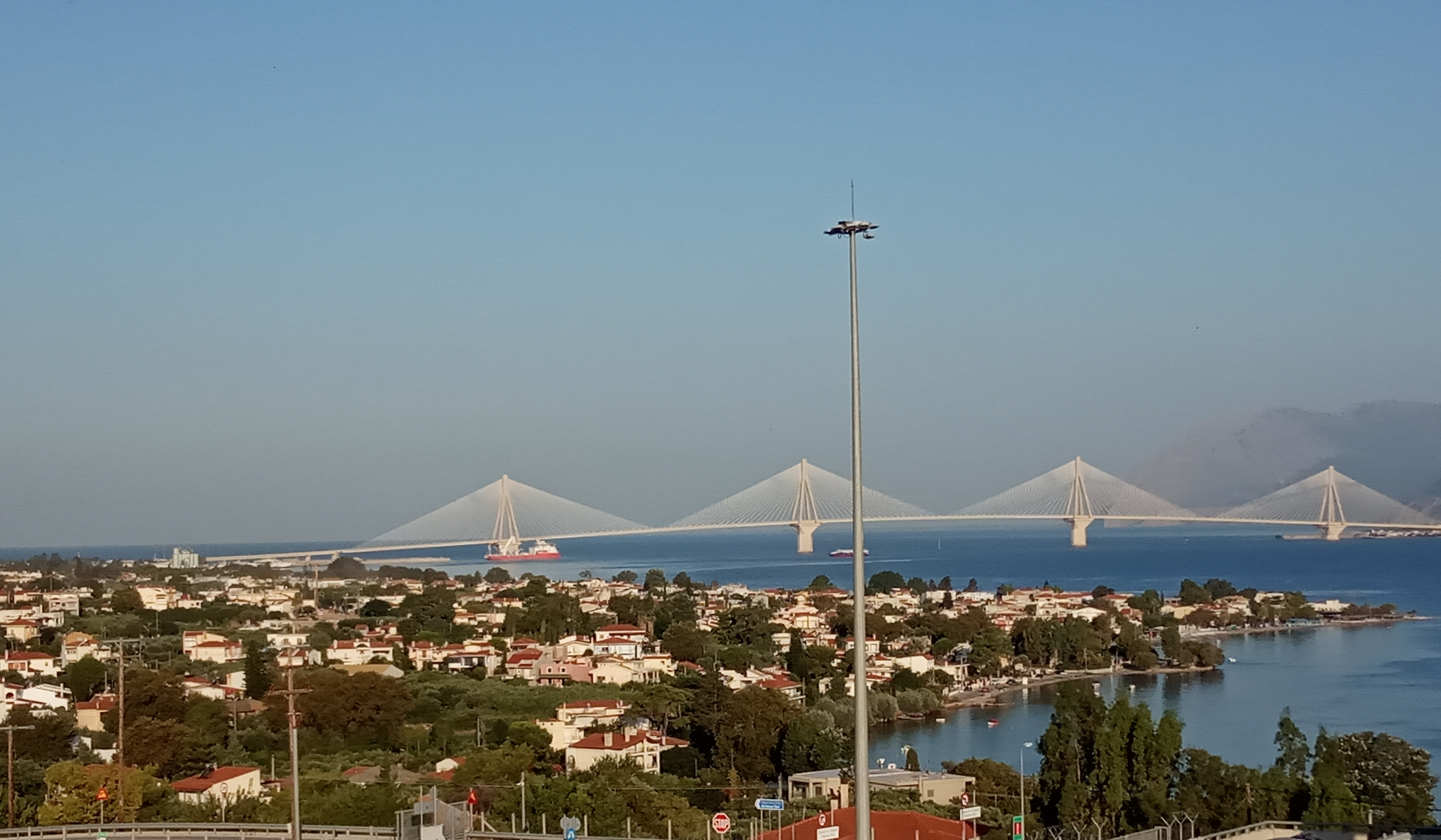
- View of Agios Vasileios from the nearby hills

- Location within Greece
- Coordinates: 38°19′N 21°49′E
- Country: Greece
- Administrative region: Western Greece
- Regional unit: Achaea
- Municipality: Patras
- Municipal unit: Rio
- Elevation: 15 m (49 ft)

Population (2021)
  - Community: 2,889
- Time zone: UTC+2 (EET)
  - Summer (DST): UTC+3 (EEST)
- Postal code: 265 00
- Vehicle registration: AX

Agios Vasileios (Greek: Άγιος Βασίλειος) is a coastal village in the municipal unit of Rio, in the municipality of Patras. It is located on the Gulf of Corinth, 3 km northeast of Rio, Greece. The Greek National Road 8A (Patras - Corinth) passes south of the village.

== Historical population ==
Year	Population
1981	640
1991	1,491
2001	2,045
2011	2,662
2021	2,889

== See also ==
- List of settlements in Achaea

== Gallery ==
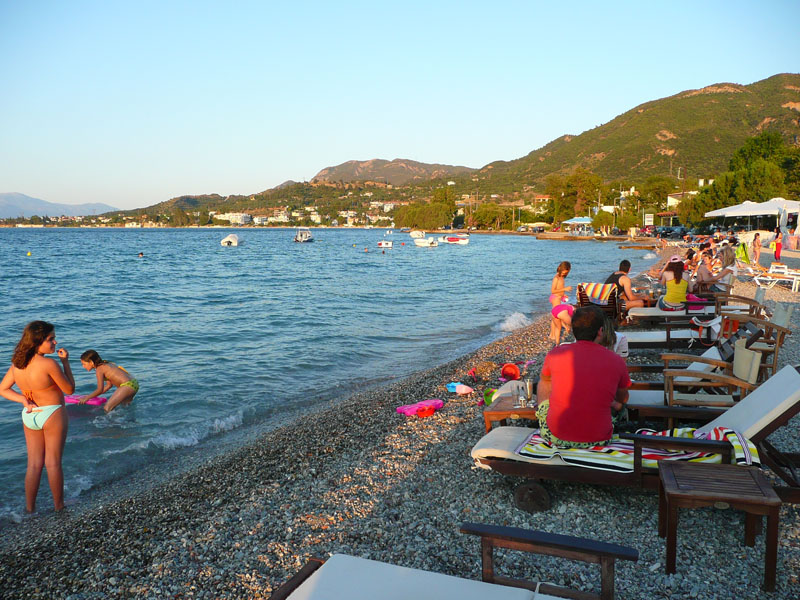
The beach of Agios Vasileios in Achaea, Greece
