= General University Hospital of Patras =

Coordinates: 38°17′42.277″N 21°47′43.904″E

Geography
- Location: Rio, Patras, Achaea, Greece

Organisation
- Care system: Public
- Type: Teaching
- Affiliated university: University of Patras

Services
- Emergency department: Yes
- Beds: 800

History
- Opened: 1988

Links
- Website: Home Page
- Lists: Hospitals in Greece

University General Hospital of Patras (Greek: Πανεπιστημιακό Γενικό Νοσοκομείο Πατρών), is a public general hospital located next to the University of Patras. in Rio, Greece, just few kilometers away from the city of Patras.The construction of the hospital was completed in 1988 and a few months later it began operation. It is part of the ESY (Greek: ΕΣΥ - Εθνικό Σύστημα Υγείας), the National Healthcare System of Greece. It was renamed General University Hospital of Patras - All Holy Theotokos the Helper (Greek: Πανεπιστημιακό Γενικό Νοσοκομείο Πατρών Παναγία η Βοήθεια) in July 2009.

The hospital is affiliated with the University of Patras. It is teaching facility of University of Patras' School of Medicine. With a capacity of 800 beds and an area of 75,000 sq. m. it is the largest Hospital in the region of Peloponnese and one of the largest hospitals in Greece with over 10,000 operations performed, and over 300,000 cases handled each year.

== Purpose ==
University Hospital of Patras provides secondary and especially tertiary care to the citizens from the southwestern part of Greece. It supports the operation of university clinics, workshops and special units of the University of Patras' School of Medicine and provides training to doctors and other health care professionals and research development in the health sector.

== Notes ==
- General University Hospital of Patras' Pediatric Intensive Care Unit began operating in August 2007 and provides medical care for children ages one month -15 years old. Part of the Pediatric Intensive Care Units’ Renovation Program was supported by a SNF (Stavros Niarchos Foundation) Grant in 2010. The grant included repairs and renovations, the purchase of equipment, and the installment of network interface software.
- In Greece, Hematopoietic Cell Transplantation (HCT) was first performed in 1985 and over 250 are now carried out every year. There are transplant units in several hospitals. The 4 major units that perform Allogeneic – stem cells harvested from genetically similar but not identical donors – and Autologous - stem cells harvested from self- HCTs are found at the "EVANGELISMOS" Hospital in Athens, the "PAPANIKOLAOU" Hospital in Thessaloniki and the PATRAS UNIVERSITY GENERAL HOSPITAL in Rio-Patras and the "AGHIA SOPHIA" Children's Hospital in Athens. At the Bone Marrow Transplantation Unit of the University Hospital of Patras, a fully accredited Allogeneic Hematopoietic Stem Cell Transplantation Program has been established, which performs all types of transplants (related, unrelated, haploidentical).

== Gallery ==
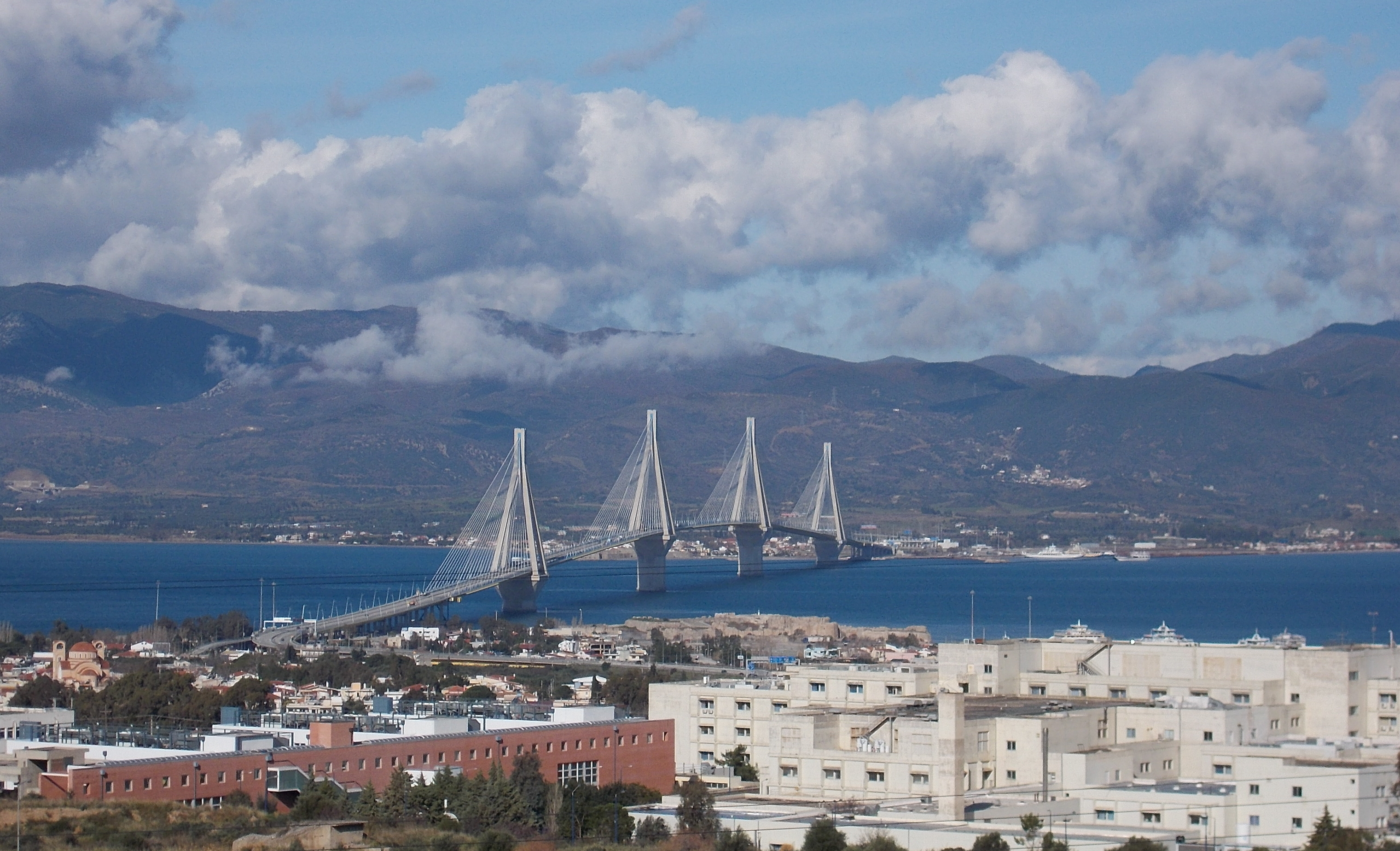
Back view of the Patras university hospital and the new buildings of the department of medicine

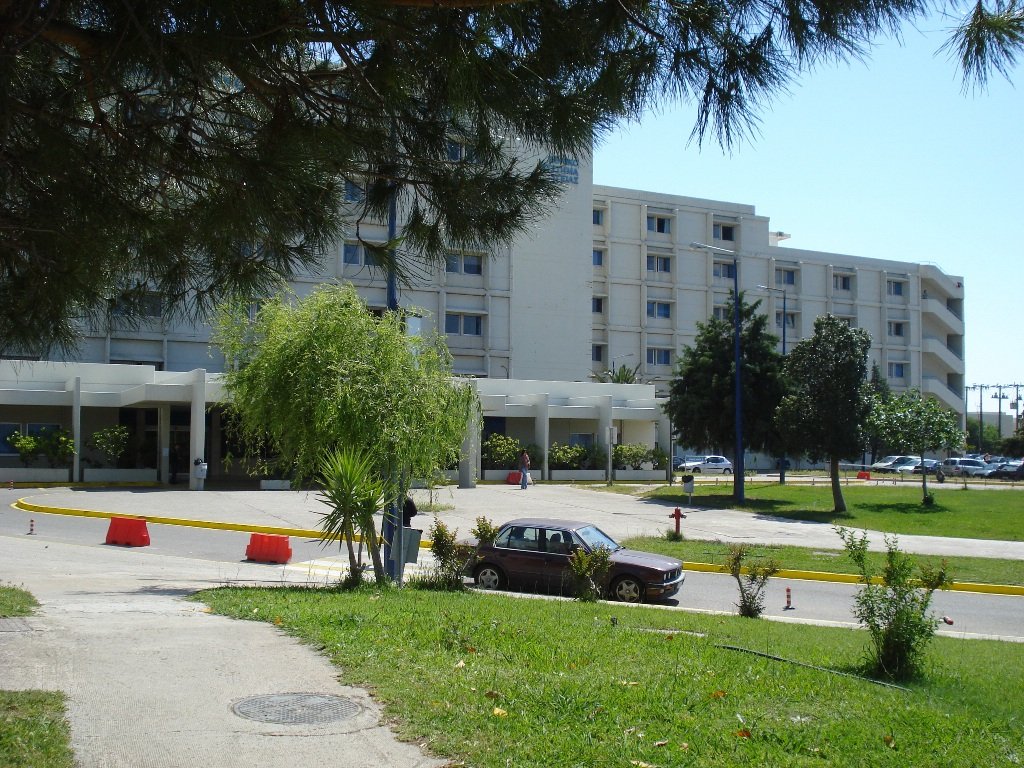
University Hospital of Patras, main building
