= Greek–Turkish earthquake diplomacy =

Disaster-influenced relations

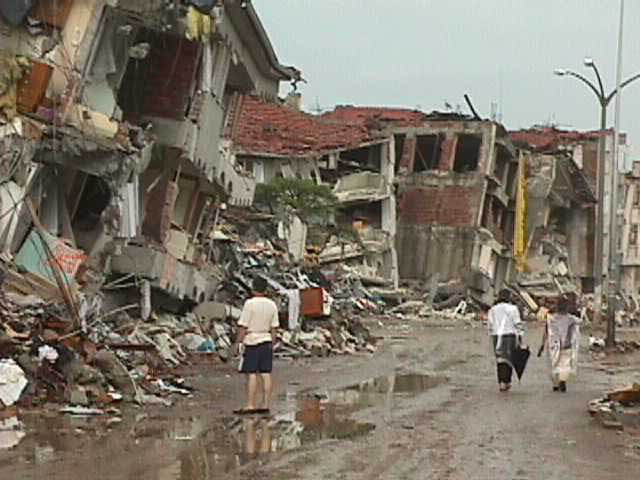
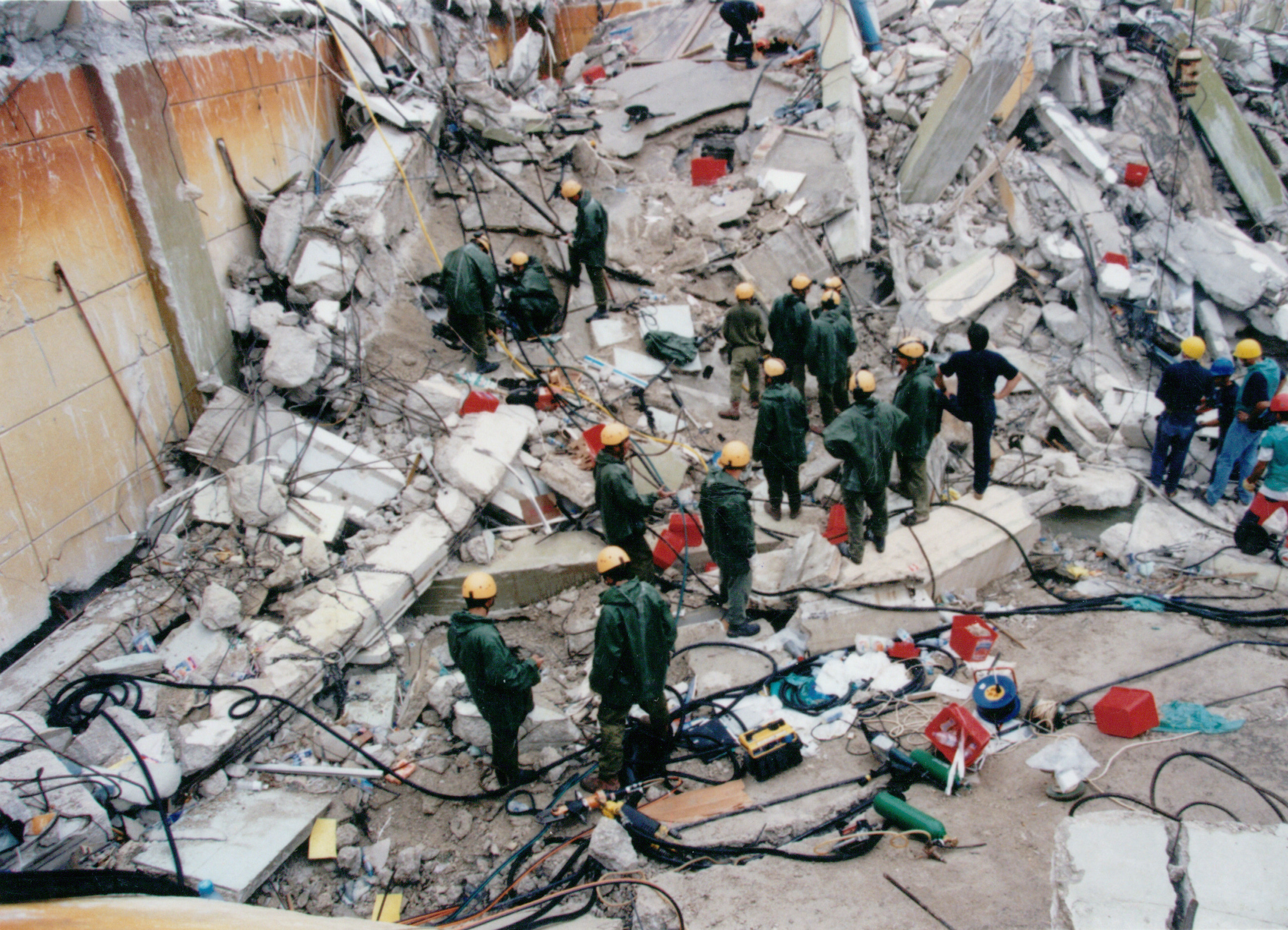
Ruins of İzmit and Athens after the August 1999 earthquake and the September 1999 earthquake, respectively.

Greek–Turkish earthquake diplomacy is a phenomenon that has existed since the summer of 1999, when Greece and Turkey were hit by successive earthquakes. It began with a generous Greek relief effort in Turkey following the İzmit earthquake on 17 August. Less than a month later, on 7 September, the Athens earthquake occurred and was met with a similarly generous Turkish relief effort in Greece. Prior to these mutual efforts, Greece–Turkey relations were generally marked by near-constant hostility stemming from the Istanbul pogrom of 1955. The magnanimous development of "earthquake diplomacy" between the two countries generated an outpouring of sympathy and assistance provided by ordinary Greeks and Turks in both cases; such acts were encouraged from the top and took many foreigners by surprise. They prepared the public for a breakthrough in bilateral ties, which had been marred by decades of diplomatic tension and, in the case of Cyprus, armed conflict.

== Origins in 1999 ==
=== İzmit earthquake in August ===
On 17 August 1999, at 3:02 a.m. local time, Turkey experienced a very large earthquake centered around the Gölcük and Arifiye areas in Kocaeli snd Sakarya (Adapazarı) provinces. The most severely affected area was the industrial city of İzmit. The İzmit earthquake registered 7.6 on the moment magnitude scale, lasted for 45 seconds, and had a maximum Mercalli intensity of IX (Violent). The official number of casualties was about 17,000, although the numbers could be above 35,000. Three hundred thousand people were left homeless and the financial cost is estimated at 3 billion dollars. Turkey's largest city, Istanbul, was also affected with many buildings damaged and deaths amounting to dozens of people. The rupture passed through major cities that are among the most industrialized and urban areas of the country, including oil refineries, several car companies, and the navy headquarters and arsenal in Gölcük, thus increasing the severity of the life and property loss.

==== Greek response ====
The main characteristic of this particular human crisis was the difficulty of the Turkish authorities to apply any rational planning because of the magnitude of the disaster, and the fact that the majority of the Greek initiatives were undertaken not only by the government, but mainly and most importantly by local authorities, NGOs and individuals.

Greece was the first foreign country to pledge aid and support to Turkey. Within hours of the earthquake, the Greek Ministry of Foreign Affairs had contacted their counterparts in Turkey, and the minister sent his personal envoys to Turkey. On 17 August 1999, and on 13 November 1999, the Greek Ministry of Public Order sent a rescue team of 24 people and two trained rescue dogs. The Ministry also sent fire extinguishing planes to help with putting out the fire in the Tupras refinery. The Secretariat of Civil Protections (working under the auspices of the Greek Ministry of Interior Affairs) had previously sent a fully equipped medical team of 11 people, four of whom were doctors as well as thousands of tents, mobile hospital units, ambulances, medicine, water, clothes, foods and blankets. The Greek Ministry of Defence readied three C-130 planes for transportation of the Greek rescue team along with the equipment and the medicines. On 18 August 1999, the Ministry of Health set up three units for blood donations. The same day aid was sent by the National and Kapodistrian University of Athens. On 19 August 1999, the Greek Ministry of Foreign Affairs set up three receiving stations in Athens, Thessaloniki and Komotini, whose purpose was the gathering of the citizens' spontaneous help. After 19 August, the hospitals of Komotini and Xanthi set up their own units for blood donations, and the Church of Greece initiated a fund raiser.

On 24 August 1999, the five biggest municipalities of Greece (Athens, Thessaloniki, Piraeus, Patras, Herakleion) sent a joint convoy with aid. The municipality of Thessaloniki had started sending its own aid since 19 August 1999. On 25 August 1999, the National Association of Local Authorities (ΚΕΔΚΕ) offered 50,000,000 drachmas for the victims of the earthquake, and the Association of Local Authorities of Attica offered 30,000,000 drachmas to the Turkish ambassador in Athens. The same day, the municipality of Athens created a settlement for 1,000 persons with a nursery. Aid and equipped groups were also sent by the Greek Red Cross, the Athens' Medicine Association, and the Greek departments of the Médecins Sans Frontières and of the Médecins du Monde.

The Greek response to the earthquake received wide coverage in Turkey with newspaper headings such as "Friendship Time", "Friendly Hands in Black Days", "A Great Support Organization – Five Greek Municipalities say there is no flag or ideology in humanitarian aid", "Help Flows in from Neighbors – Russia first, Greece the most".

Both the official response and dialog and the reactions of the ordinary Greek were given wide coverage almost every day in every newspaper and on every TV channel in Turkey. Incidents such as people bringing in food donations to municipalities in Greece and blood drives in Greece specifically to be sent to earthquake victims in Turkey were highlighted. The emotional language in reporting differed significantly from the usual rhetoric found in both countries—words such as "neighbor", "true friend" were given in the headlines.

Officials in both countries used the emotional state of both populations to good effect, emphasizing at every opportunity that this was the time for a new understanding. When the Mayor of Athens came personally to visit the earthquake site, he was met at the airport by the Mayor of Istanbul. The Greek Chief Admiral Ioannides came to the retirement ceremony of the Turkish Chief Admiral Dervişoğlu where he was applauded for several minutes by the participants of the ceremony.

=== Athens earthquake in September ===
Less than a month after the Turkish disaster, on September 7, 1999, at 2:56 pm local time, a magnitude 6.0 earthquake struck the city of Athens. This was the most devastating and costly natural disaster to hit the country in 20 years. The tremor had a very shallow hypocenter and an epicenter close to the Athenian suburbs of Ano Liossia and Acharnes, just 18 km (11 mi) away from the downtown area. A total of 143 people lost their lives in the disaster while more than 12,000 were treated for injuries. Though the death toll was relatively low, the damage to buildings and infrastructure in some of the city's northern and western suburbs was severe.

==== Turkish response ====
This time, the Turkish side reciprocated the aid. A special taskforce was convened, consisting of the Undersecretariat of the Prime Ministry, Turkish Armed Forces, the Ministry of Foreign Affairs and Ministry of Internal Affairs and the Greek Ambassador in Ankara was contacted to pledge aid. The Turkish aid was the first to arrive, with the first 20-person rescue team arriving at the site on a military plane within 13 hours after the earthquake. More followed within hours. The Greek consulates and embassy in Turkey had their phone lines jammed with Turks calling to find out whether they could donate blood and one volunteer contacted Ambassador Corantis, offering to donate his kidney for a "Greek in need".

== Continued tradition ==
=== 2020 İzmir earthquake and Greek response ===
In 2020, a 6.7 magnitude earthquake and tsunami hit the western coast of Turkey, particularly the city of Izmir, and the Greek island of Samos. Prime Minister Kyriakos Mitsotakis called President Recep Tayyip Erdogan to offer condolences, and the Greek government sent rescue teams to aid in rescue efforts.

=== 2023 Turkey–Syria earthquakes and Greek response in Turkey ===
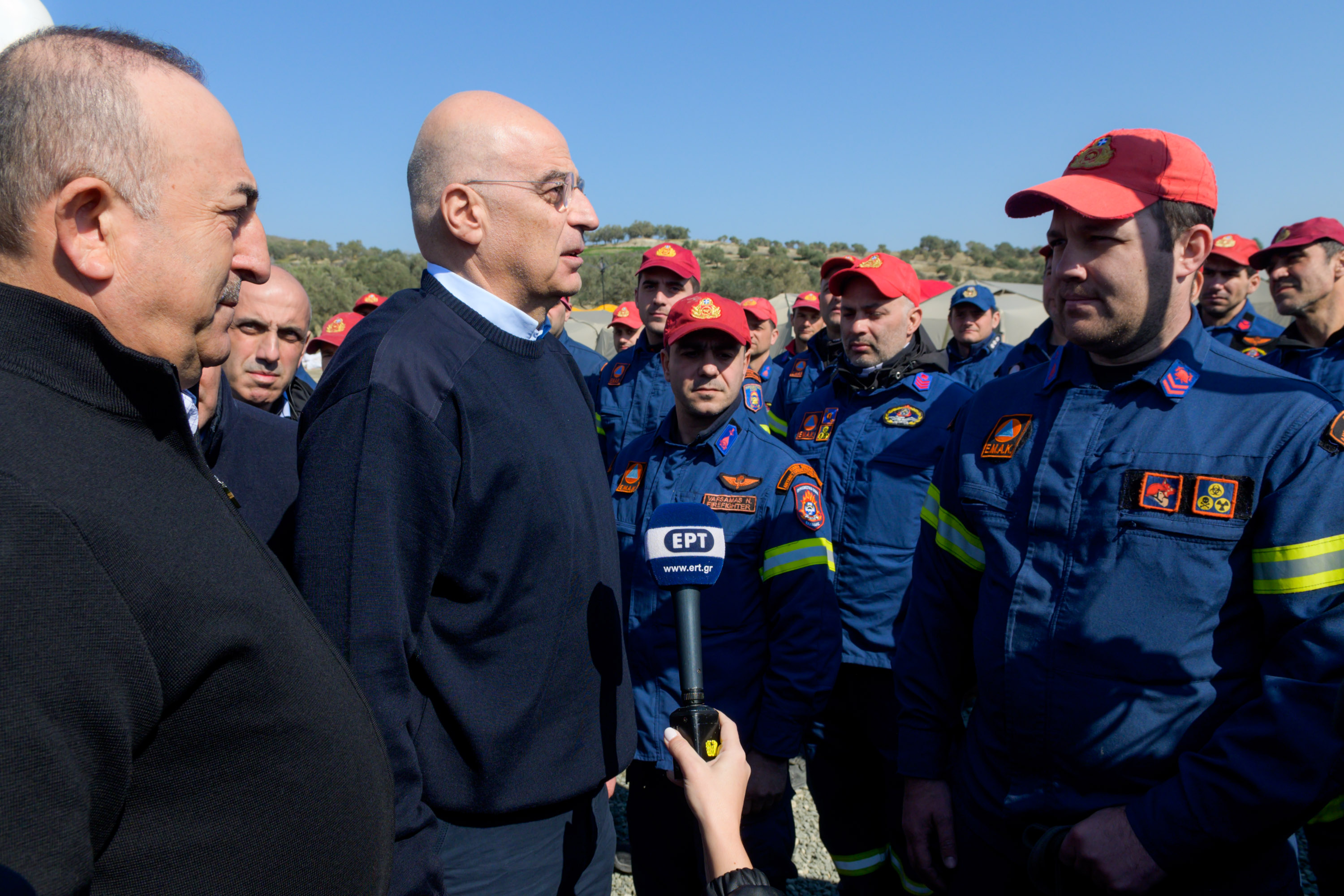
Greek foreign minister Nikos Dendias and Turkish foreign minister Mevlut Çavuşoğlu visiting the rescue centre at Antakya, 2023

Following a deadly 7.8 magnitude earthquake in Kahramanmaraş on 6 February 2023, Greece was the first country to respond, showing strong solidarity to Turkey with the humanitarian aid being escorted to the affected areas personally by high-level government officials, including the Greek Civil Protection Minister.

Immediately after the earthquake, the Greek government sent a rescue squad to Turkey, as well as "additional equipment, medical supplies, blankets, tents", with approval from the Turkish government. Specifically, a team of 21 firefighters, 2 rescue dogs and a special rescue vehicle were dispatched to Turkey from Elefsina on a Lockheed C-130 Hercules. Following the team was a fire brigade officer-engineer, 5 doctors and rescuers from the National Center for Emergency Care.

Greek Prime minister Kyriakos Mitsotakis phoned the Turkish president Recep Tayyip Erdoğan, pledging further quake-relief assistance. Foreign Minister Nikos Dendias and Defence Minister Panos Panagiotopoulos spoke with their Turkish counterparts, Mevlüt Çavuşoğlu and Hulusi Akar, to express their condolences and readiness for providing aid. Greece's swift response to the humanitarian crisis in Turkey contributed to the hashtags "Teşekkürler Yunanistan" and "Teşekkürler komşu", translating into "Thank you, Greece" and "Thank you, neighbor" respectively, becoming popular on Twitter.

The German newspaper Süddeutsche Zeitung noted that the Greek aid comes despite severe diplomatic tensions in recent months and the Erdoğan's repeated threats to militarily invade Greece's islands. According to Deutsche Welle, these developments marked the revival of the earthquake diplomacy between the two countries, once again.

On 8 February, more rescue teams departed from Greece for Turkey, including 15 firefighters and 3 lifesavers. Nation-wide campaigns to gather relief supplies such as blankets, clothes, milk powder, diapers, napkins, laundry detergents, serums, gauze, hand plasters, personal hygiene items, masks, gloves, antiseptics and medical equipment were initiated, and the items being gathered in Athens and Thessaloniki by humanitarian organizations and agencies, as well as in the smaller cities by the local municipalities and football federations. Additionally, the Greek PM ordered 5 airplanes full of health and medical equipment and basic necessities such as 7,500 blankets, 1,500 beds and 500 tents which can accommodate families and be used as mobile clinics, to be sent to Turkey.

Reports and footage was released on that day, of Greek rescuers pulling people from the rubble in Hatay, including at least four children.

On 9 February, and upon his arrival at the European Council meeting, the Greek PM Mitsotakis proposes a donor conference for Turkey to be held at Brussels, so that additional financial resources can be found to help rebuild the affected areas and announced that his country will also be at the forefront [of these efforts] for organizing it.

By 10 February, reportedly "thousands" of Greeks had responded to calls for aid to quake-hit Turkey, with the Athens offices of the Hellenic Red Cross, pilling up with sleeping bags, blankets, milk cans and boxes of medicine. A convoy carrying 40 tonnes of aid left for Turkey early that day.

On 12 February, Dendias traveled to Turkey, where he was received by Çavuşoğlu. The two foreign ministers toured an operations centre in Antakya, observed the devastation to the city from the air, and visited a camp where international rescue teams are based.

The humanitarian aid mission completed on midnight of February 13, with a total 8 airplanes transferring and handing over the supplies to the Turkish authorities. The cost of transporting the humanitarian aid is covered by 75% by the European Civil Protection Mechanism, while the remaining 25% is sponsored by private Greek companies.

On 15 February, the efforts continued with even more humanitarian aid being sent from Greece, with six trucks loaded with specific items requested by the Turkish side, such as blankets, tents, sleeping bags and chemical toilets. Additionally, 4 large containers with 50 tons of basic necessities are planned to be delivered through the Greek seaport of Patras two days later, on 17 February.

Greek Olympic gold medalist Miltiadis Tentoglou decided to auction his sports shoes which he worn in his long jumping performance at the World Athletics Indoor Tour in France on 15 February, with the proceeds to be donated for the child victims of the quake.

On 10 March, another humanitarian aid shipment loaded on three large trucks full of emergency supplies and a rescue vehicle, from the Hellenic Red Cross's warehouses, left for Turkey to be delivered directly to the Turkish Red Crescent warehouses.

On 20 March, Turkish Foreign Minister Mevlut Cavusoglu and Greek FM Nikos Dendias, in a symbolic move, entered together the hall of the International Donors' Conference in support of the people hit by the earthquake in Turkey and Syria, where the international community pledged 7 billion euros for the reconstruction efforts in the quake-hit areas.

== See also ==
- Greece–Turkey relations
