= Zefyri =

Zefyri Ζεφύρι
- Municipal unit
- Location within the regional unit

- Location within Greece
- Coordinates: 38°4′N 23°43′E
- Country: Greece
- Administrative region: Attica
- Regional unit: West Attica
- Municipality: Fyli

Area
  - Municipal unit: 1.400 km^{2} (0.541 sq mi)
- Elevation: 150 m (490 ft)

Population (2021)
  - Municipal unit: 9,901
  - Municipal unit density: 7,072/km^{2} (18,320/sq mi)
- Time zone: UTC+2 (EET)
  - Summer (DST): UTC+3 (EEST)
- Postal code: 134 51
- Area code: 210
- Vehicle registration: Z

Zefyri (Greek: Ζεφύρι, before 1963: Ζοφριά, Zofria, between 1963 and 1967: Βασίλισσα Φρειδερίκη, Vasilissa Freideriki) is a part of Athens and former municipality in West Attica, Greece. Since the 2011 local government reform it is part of the municipality Fyli, of which it is a municipal unit. The municipal unit has an area of 1.400 km^{2}.

== Geography ==
Zefyri is situated near the northeastern end of the Aigaleo mountains. Its built-up area is continuous with those of the neighbouring suburbs Ano Liosia, Acharnes and Kamatero. The A6 motorway passes through Zefyri, by the 440 m cut and cover Zefyri Tunnel. Zefyri is 2 km southeast of Ano Liosia, 2 km southwest of Acharnes and about 10 km north of Athens city centre. The old metric Piraeus–Patras railway and the new Athens Airport–Patras railway pass through Zefyri.

== History ==
In the 1950s and 1960s, internal migrants in Greece arrived in the area and many illegally settled on surrounding agricultural land owned by Ano Liosia, which later became the separate settlement of Zefyri. Zefyri was one of several suburbs heavily impacted by the 1999 Athens earthquake, which caused damage to a number of buildings.

== Demographics ==
| Year | Population |
|---|---|
| 1981 | 4,906 |
| 1991 | 8,985 |
| 2001 | 8,860 |
| 2011 | 9,454 |
| 2021 | 9,901 |

In the early 21st century, the Roma population of Zefyri numbers 3,000, with some living as permanent or semi-permanent residents in houses or shacks, while others are nomadic. Their living conditions are difficult. The Roma of Zefyri belong to the Rudari subgroup and have their own local organisation which participates in wider Roma networks and initiatives.

== See also ==
- List of municipalities of Attica
