= 1999 Athens earthquake =

6.0 Mw earthquake

- Location within Greece
- UTC time: 1999-09-07 11:56:51
- ISC event: 1655758
- USGS-ANSS: ComCat
- Local date: September 7, 1999
- Local time: 14:56:51 EEST
- Magnitude: 6.0 M_{w}
- Depth: 10.0 km (6.2 mi)
- Epicenter: 38.06°N 23.51°E
- Type: Normal-slip
- Areas affected: Greece
- Total damage: $3–4.2 billion
- Max. intensity: MMI IX (Violent)
- Peak acceleration: 0.6 g
- Casualties: 143 dead, 800–1,600 injured 50,000 homeless

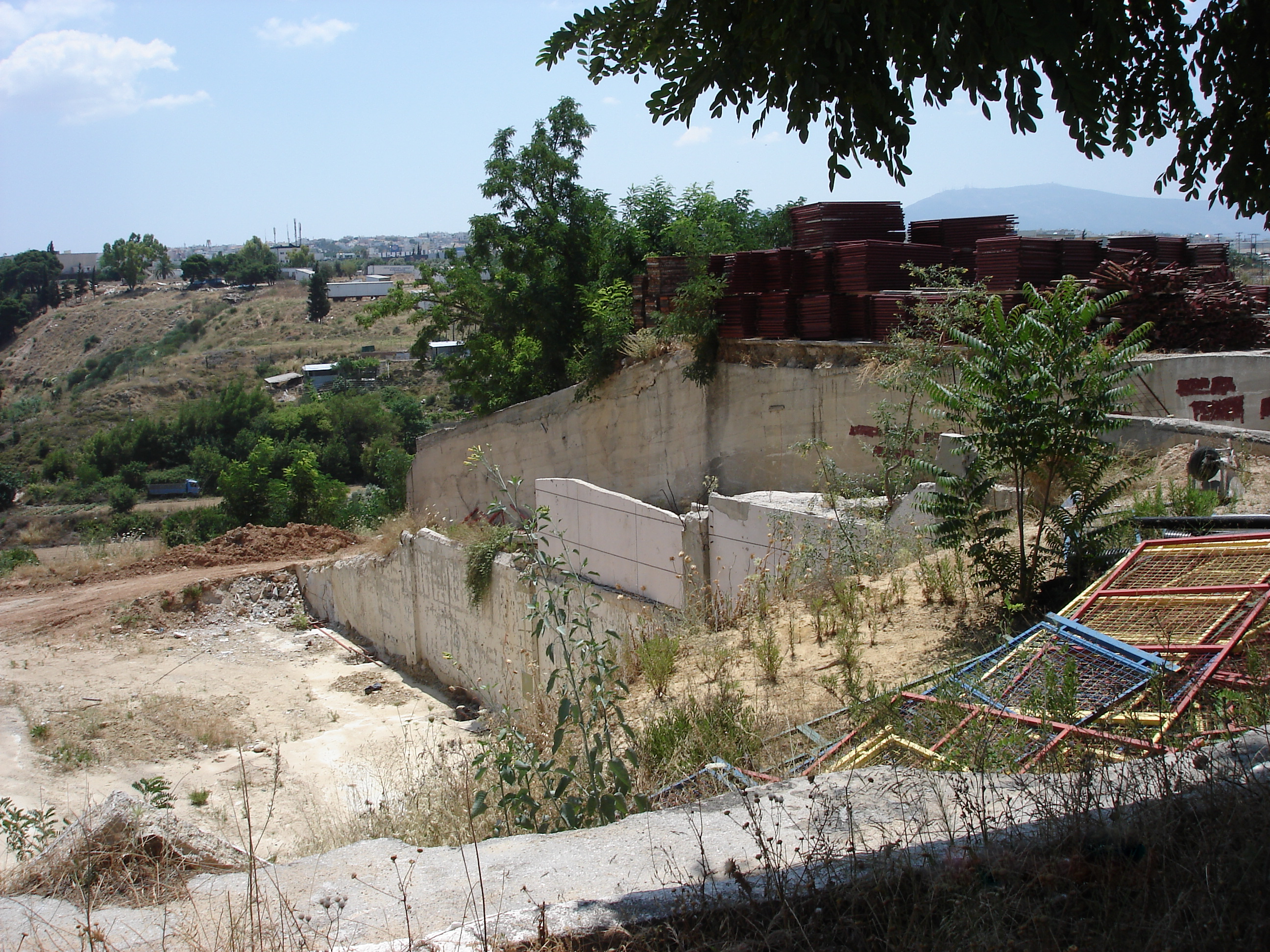
Ricomex industry (Vileda)

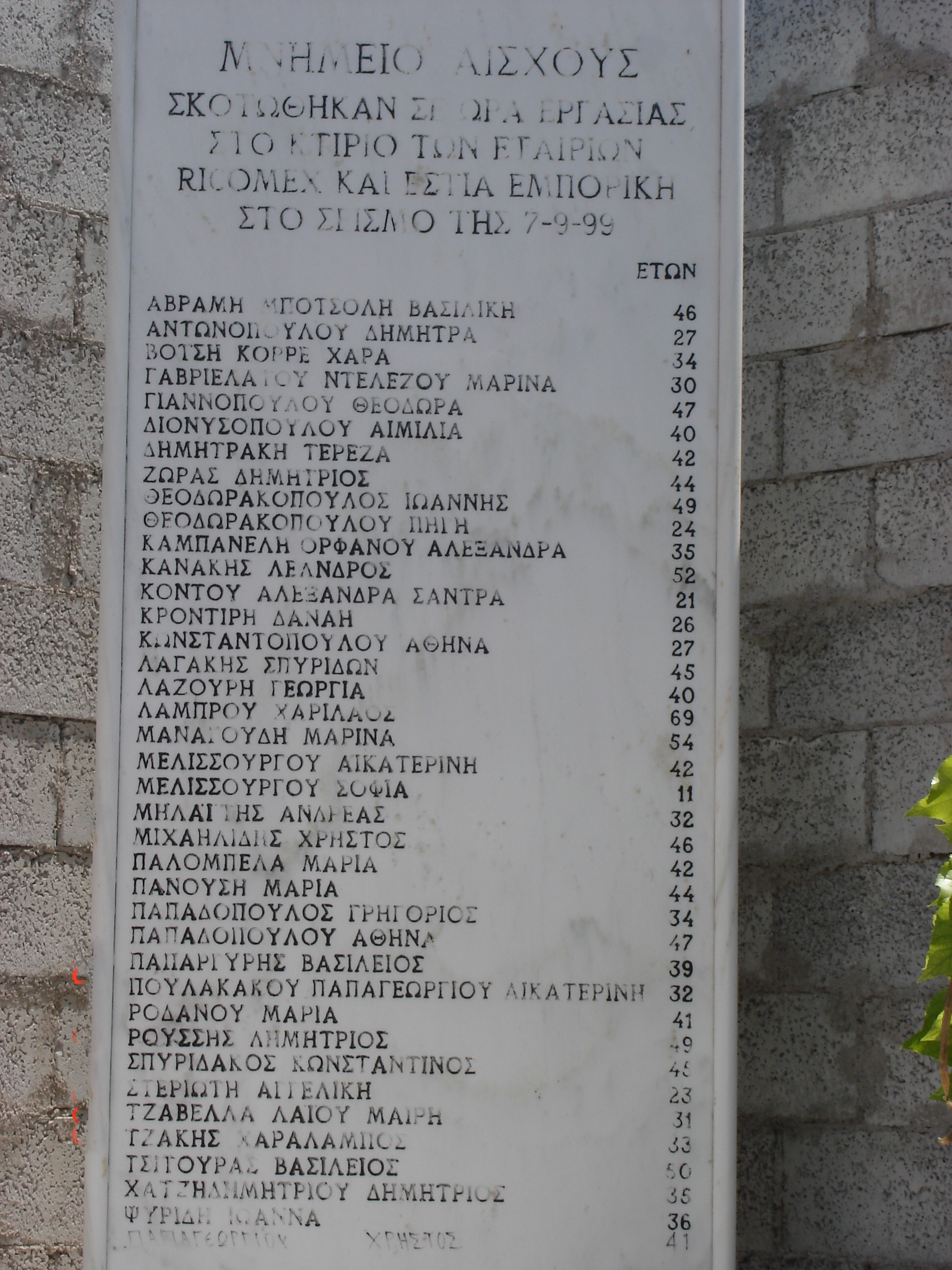
Ricomex industry (Vileda) monument

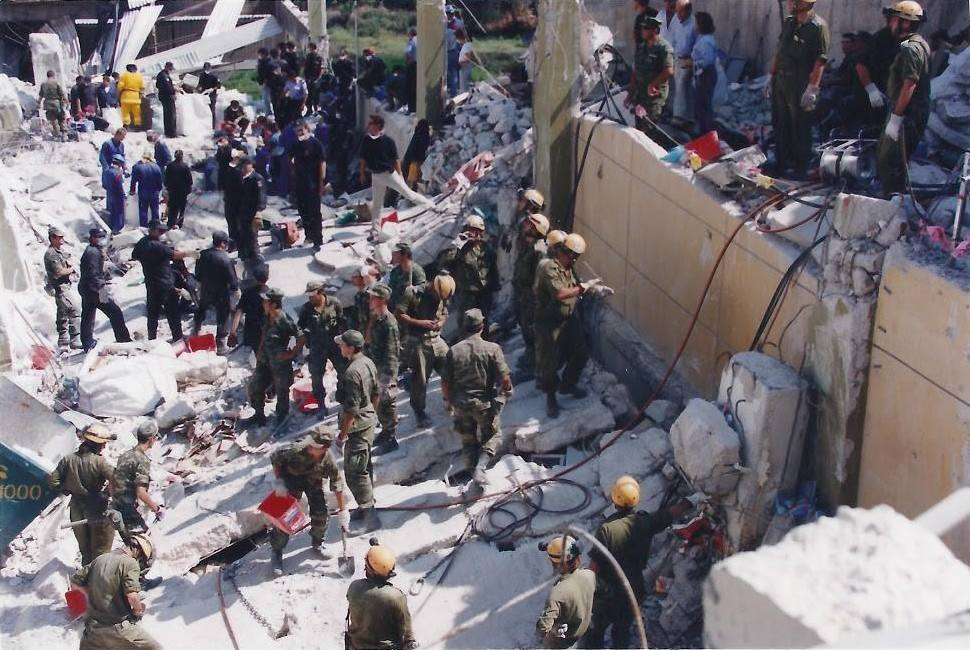
IDF relief mission, September 1999

The 1999 Athens earthquake occurred on September 7 at 14:56:51 local time near Mount Parnitha in Greece with a moment magnitude of 6.0 and a maximum Mercalli intensity of IX (Violent). The proximity to the Athens metropolitan area resulted in widespread structural damage, mainly to the nearby suburban towns of Ano Liosia, Acharnes, Fyli, Thrakomakedones, Kifissia, Metamorfosi, Kamatero and Nea Filadelfeia. More than 100 buildings (including three major factories) across those areas collapsed trapping scores of victims under their rubble while dozens more were severely damaged. With damage estimated at $3–4.2 billion, 143 people were killed, and up to 1,600 were treated for injuries in Greece's deadliest natural disaster in almost half a century.

== Tectonic setting ==
Greece is a seismically active country, located in a complex zone of interaction of the African, Eurasian, Aegean Sea, and Anatolian plates. Southern Greece itself is located on the Aegean Sea plate. The Anatolian Plate is moving southwest into the Aegean Sea plate at a rate of 3 cm per year relative to the Eurasian plate. Meanwhile, the African plate subduction beneath the Aegean Sea plate at a rate of 4 cm per year along the Hellenic Subduction Zone.

== Damage ==
The quake began in the afternoon of 7 September 1999. It was the most devastating and costly natural disaster to hit the country in nearly 20 years. The last major earthquake to hit Athens took place on February 24, 1981, near the Alkyonides Islands of the Corinthian Gulf, some 87 km to the west of the Greek capital. Registering a moment magnitude of 6.7, the 1981 earthquake had resulted in the deaths of 20 people and considerable and widespread structural damage in the city of Corinth, nearby towns and sections of Athens' western suburbs.

Apart from the proximity of the epicenter to the Athens Metropolitan Area, this quake also featured a very shallow hypocenter combined with unusually high ground accelerations. Unexpectedly heavy damage also affected the town of Adames. The Acropolis of Athens and the rest of the city's famous ancient monuments escaped the disaster either totally unharmed or suffering only minor damage. A landslide as well as several fissures were reported along the road leading to the peak of Mount Parnitha. Regency Casino Mont Parnes was damaged by the earthquake, causing numerous rooms to collapse and the building's northeastern wing to detach from rest of the building. Minor damage was also reported to water and waste networks close to the epicenter.

== Strong motion ==
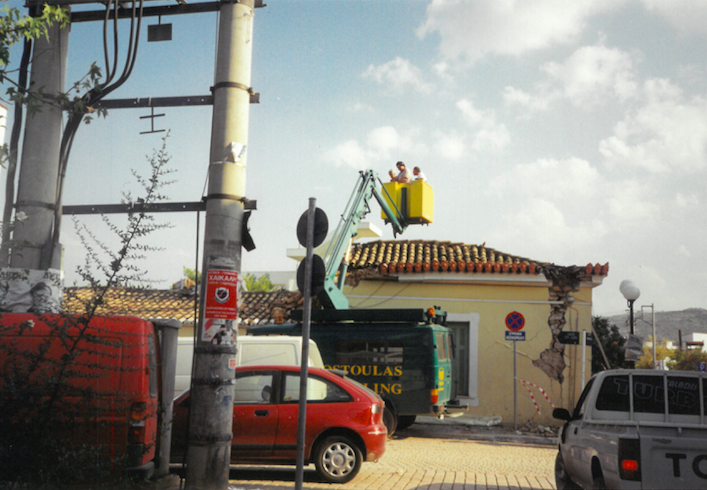
Rescue in Ano Liosia 7 September 1999.

This event took Greek seismologists by surprise as it came from a previously unknown fault, originating in an area that was for a long time considered of a particularly low seismicity. The highest recorded peak ground acceleration was 0.3g, at 15 km from the epicentre, with attenuation predicting 0.6g acceleration at the centre.

== Response ==
The tremor took place less than a month after a Turkish disaster which was much larger in scale. This succession of earthquakes and mutual help of both countries gave rise to talks about what became known as the "Greek-Turkish earthquake diplomacy", in hopes for a breakthrough in bilateral relations, which had been marred by decades of hostility. Turkey reciprocated the aid rendered by Greece immediately following the August 17, 1999 Turkish earthquake. A special taskforce was formed, consisting of the Undersecretariat of the Prime Ministry, the Turkish Armed Forces, the Ministries of Foreign Affairs and of Internal Affairs and the Greek Embassy in Ankara was contacted. The Turkish aid was the first to arrive in the affected areas, with the first 20-person rescue team arriving in Athens within 13 hours after the earthquake struck. The Greek consulates and the embassy in Turkey had their phone lines jammed with Turkish citizens offering blood donations.

== See also ==
- List of earthquakes in 1999
- List of earthquakes in Greece
- 2019 Athens earthquake
