= Ano Liosia =

Ano Liosia Άνω Λιόσια
- Municipal unit
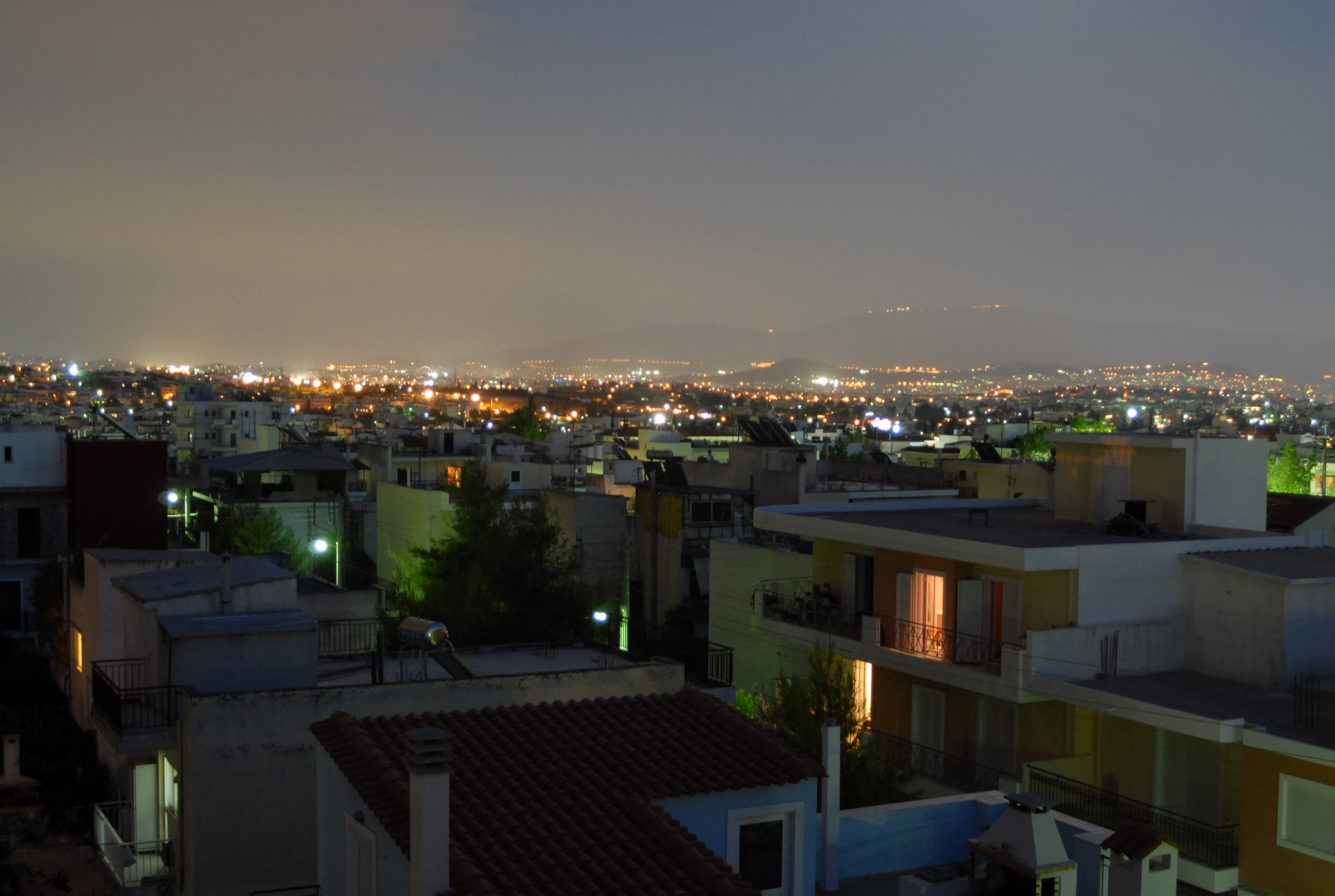
- View of Northeast Athens from Ano Liosia

- Location within the regional unit

- Location within Greece
- Coordinates: 38°5′N 23°42′E
- Country: Greece
- Administrative region: Attica
- Regional unit: West Attica
- Municipality: Fyli

Area
  - Municipal unit: 38.447 km^{2} (14.844 sq mi)
- Elevation: 160 m (520 ft)

Population (2021)
  - Municipal unit: 35,047
  - Municipal unit density: 911.57/km^{2} (2,360.9/sq mi)
- Time zone: UTC+2 (EET)
  - Summer (DST): UTC+3 (EEST)
- Postal code: 133 xx
- Area code: 210
- Vehicle registration: Z
- Website: www.fyli.gr

Ano Liosia (Greek: Άνω Λιόσια, 'Upper Liosia') is a town and a former municipality in the northern part of the Athens agglomeration, Greece. Since the 2011 local government reform it is part of the municipality Fyli, of which it is the seat and a municipal unit. The municipal unit has an area of 38.447 km^{2}.

== Name ==
The placename Ano Liosia is derived from the surname Liosas and stems from the Albanian Loshi. In Arvanitika, the word is rendered as ljioshe, and also as ljosh-i and describes 'a smooth, grassy mountain location ideal for grazing; a pasture'. In the medieval period, the toponym Loshi is recorded by Greek writers as Leosas. According to Arvanite villagers in Ano Liosia, they described the placename as meaning "stranger" in Arvanitika.

== Geography ==
Ano Liosia lies in the eastern part of West Attica, between the mountains Parnitha to its north and Aigaleo to its southwest. It is 3 km west of Acharnes, 3 km north of Kamatero, 4 km southeast of Fyli, 10 km east of Aspropyrgos, and 11 km north of Athens city centre. Nearby the main road in Liosia is the small monastery of Agios Ioannis Theologos.

== Transportation ==
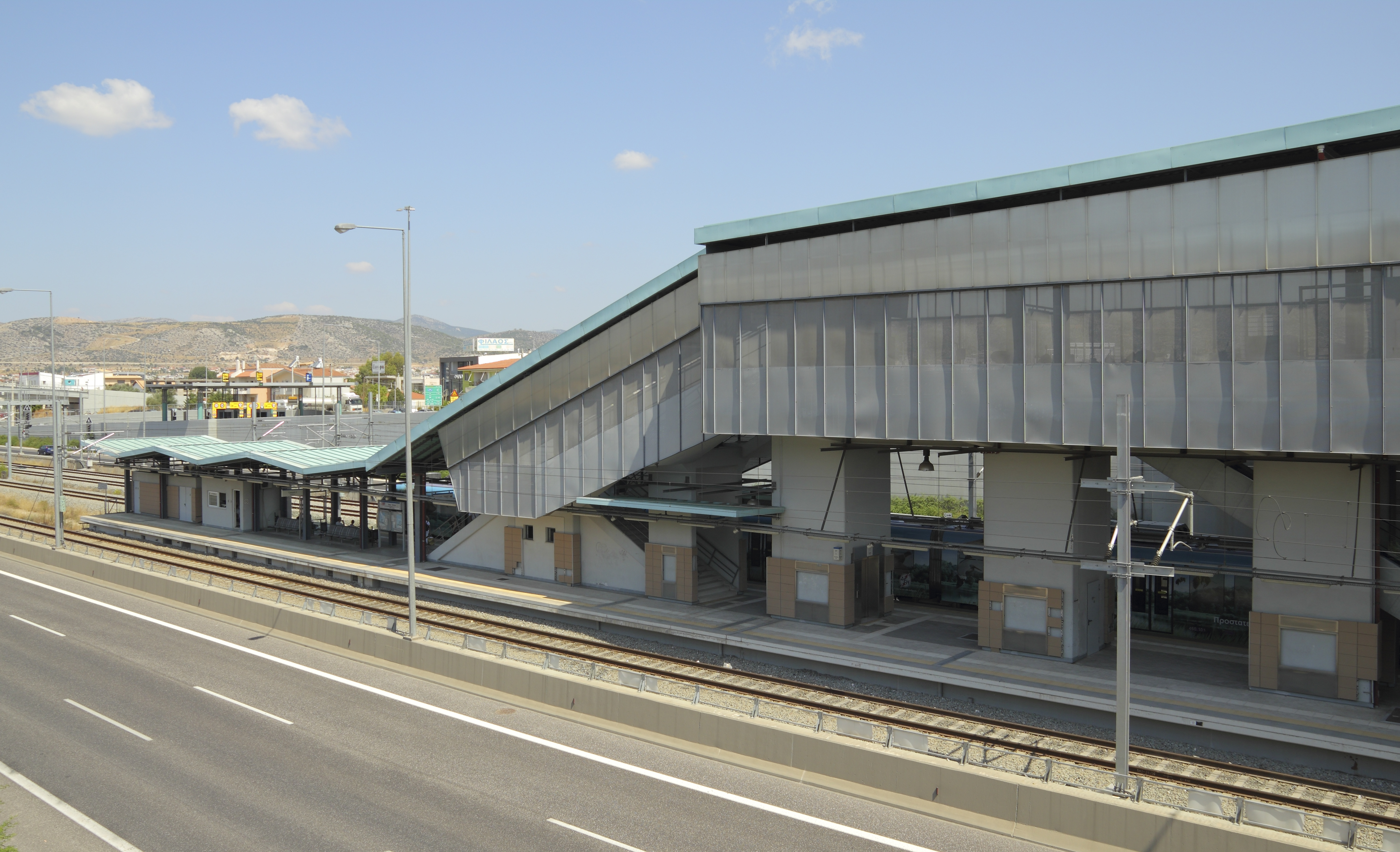
Ano Liosia Proastiakos station

The Ano Liosia railway station is served by Proastiakos trains to the Athens International Airport and to Kiato in the Peloponnese. The railway station on the old metric Piraeus–Patras railway is now closed. Ano Liosia is connected to the rest of Athens by various bus lines, most notably the B12 and 711 lines. The A6 motorway runs south of the town.

== History ==
In the late fourteenth century, Liosia was founded by Albanian Christians during their early settlement of the area. In the early 20th century, Ano Liosia was a village bordering Athens. In the 1950s and 1960s, internal migrants in Greece arrived in the area and many illegally settled on surrounding agricultural land owned by Ano Liosia, which later became the separate settlement of Zefyri. Between the 1960s and 1970s, Ano Liosia went from being a semi-rural community to an extension of Athens. The Arvanite population of Ano Liosia, descended from Albanians, sold undeveloped land without title to an incoming rural Greek population who sought affordable plots, resulting in illegal construction and shanty dwellings.

Ano Liosia was one of several suburbs heavily impacted by the 1999 Athens earthquake, which caused damage to 150 buildings. In the early 21st century, Ano Liosia had a negative reputation due to its landfill, pollution levels, and the local Roma population.

== Demographics ==
| Year | Population |
|---|---|
| 1951 | 1,660 |
| 1961 | 3,348 |
| 1971 | 11,388 |
| 1981 | 16,862 |
| 1991 | 21,397 |
| 2001 | 26,423 |
| 2011 | 33,565 |
| 2021 | 35,047 |

The primary population of Ano Liosia were Arvanites, who spoke Arvanitika and originated from Albanians who settled in Attica. Arvanitika continued to be spoken in Ano Liosia during the mid-1960s. Between the 1960s and 1970s, the population increased as Greeks originating from rural and island areas moved to Athens. During this time, social tensions arose between local Arvanites and incoming Greeks due to the demographic influx, while community-led social welfare initiatives attempted to overcome differences.

During the late 20th century, the population of Ano Liosia was 30,000. In Ano Liosia, some Roma were permanently established residents, while substantial numbers of tent-dwelling Roma nomads living on the periphery of the municipality settled at a so-called campsite in 1982. The locality lacked essential infrastructure and rapidly transformed into a ghetto with difficult living conditions. In fieldwork done by sociologist Anna Lydaki, 2,000 inhabitants were Romani people, while the community themselves estimated their numbers at 5,000. The Romani people in Ano Liosia were mainly nomadic. Tense relations exist between the Romani and non-Romani populations in Ano Liosia, where the local community remains segregated from the wider society. In the early 21st century, the Roma population of Ano Liosia numbered 3,000.

== Crime ==
Ano Liosia is considered one of the most dangerous ghettos of Greece and along with its neighbouring cities Acharnes and Zefyri hold the highest crime rates of the whole country. Many drug addicts from various districts of Attica arrive to Ano Liosia as it is a convenient region to find their dose owing to the many dealers and the low to absent police patrols.

== Sports ==
The 11th International Chess Tournament took place in Ano Liosia in 2001. The following sports teams are based in Ano Liosia:

- Akratitos - a Greek football/soccer team which was founded in 1963
- Das Ano Liosia - a Greek basketball team

Sports venues:

- Ano Liosia Olympic Hall where wrestling and judo were played in the 2004 Summer Olympics
- Zofria Indoor Hall - basketball arena that has been used by AEK Athens
- Stadium that Akratitos rarely competes
- Basketball stadium for Das Ano Liosia
- Football/soccer stadium for Akratitos
