= Varympompi =

Varympompi Βαρυμπόμπη
- Settlement
- Location within Greece
- Coordinates: 38°8′N 23°47′E
- Country: Greece
- Administrative region: Attica
- Regional unit: East Attica
- Municipality: Acharnes
- Municipal unit: Acharnes
- Elevation: 300 m (980 ft)

Population (2021)
  - Total: 1,950
- Time zone: UTC+2 (EET)
  - Summer (DST): UTC+3 (EEST)
- Postal code: 136 71
- Area code: 210 816
- Vehicle registration: Z

Varympompi or Varybobi (Greek: Βαρυμπόμπη) is a suburb of Athens in the municipality of Acharnes, East Attica, Greece.

== Geography ==
Varympompi is situated at the foot of the forested Parnitha mountains, 3 km east of Thrakomakedones, 4 km west of Kryoneri, 7 km northeast of Acharnes and about 17 km (11 mi) northeast of Athens city centre. The Olympic Village of the 2004 Summer Olympics is 3 km southwest of Varympompi. The Varympompi cliffs, northwest of the village, are a well-established rock climbing area.

== History ==
Varympompi has historically been an Arvanite settlement.

Varympompi was affected by the 2021 Greece wildfires which burnt hundreds of km². During the fire, its inhabitants were forced to evacuate to a safer place.

== Historical population ==
Historical population
Year	Pop.	±%
1991	1,354	—
2011	1,377	+1.7%
2021	1,950	+41.6%

== See also ==
- Communities of Attica
