= Parnitha Funitel =

Aerial tramway

Coordinates: 38.1449°N 23.7386°E

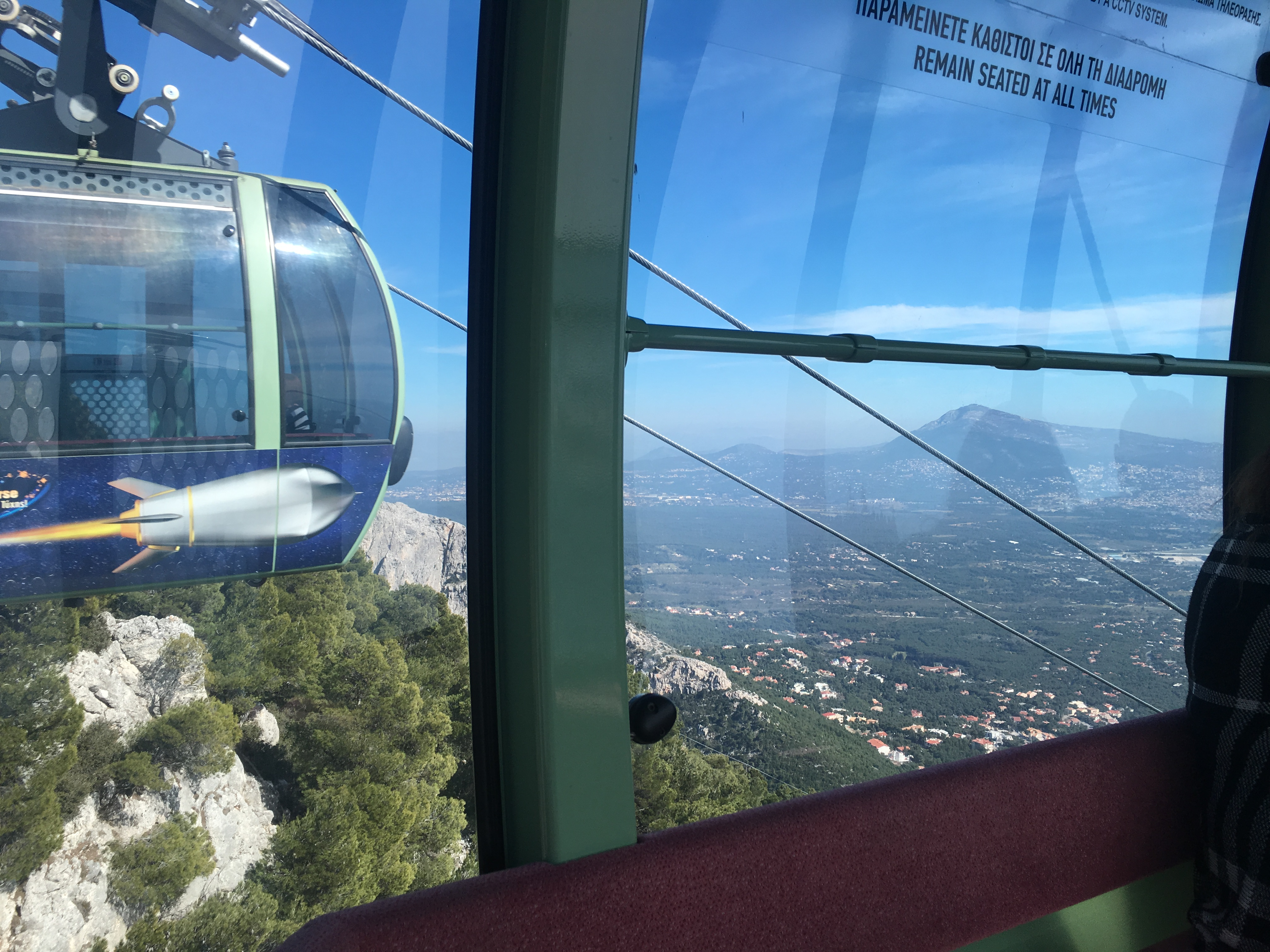
Parnitha Funitel, interior view, March 2019

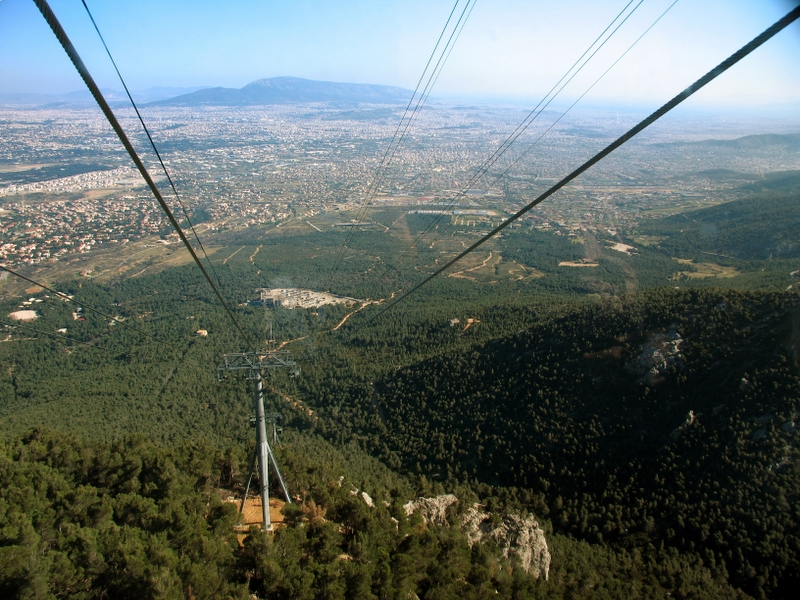
Parnitha Funitel cables, April 2006

The Parnitha Funitel on Mount Parnitha is the successor of an aerial tramway constructed in the 1970s to serve Regency Casino Mont Parnes, the most popular casino in the Athens area, located on one of the peaks of Mount Parnitha. Also, it was a common way for Athenians to reach on the peak for family day trips, a popular habit even today.

However, since April 2006, a newly built funitel, replacing the older one, was launched and it continues serving its previous purposes. Note, that it was not only a renovation, but a full construction on the place where the older funitel installation once used to be.

== Details of the old, demolished Casino Mont Parnes aerial tramway ==
  - Year of Construction: 1972
  - Line Length: 1,690 metres (~5,545 ft)
  - Average Inclination: 20 degrees (36%)
  - Max. Velocity: 7.0 m/s
  - Number of Cars: 2
  - Capacity of Cars: 30 passengers
  - Total Max. Transfer Ability: 280 passengers/hour
  - Conductors: 3
  - Engines: 1 x 194 kW (1 x 260 PS)
  - Manufacturer: Habbeger AG

== Details of the new Regency Casino Mont Parnes Funitel ==
  - Year of Construction: 2004
  - Line Length: 1,595 metres (~5,233 ft)
  - Average Inclination: 20 degrees (36%)
  - Max. Velocity: 6.0 m/s (~22 km/h)
  - Number of Cars: 24 (21 in public use, 2 for VIP personalities, 1 for line maintenance)
  - Capacity of public cars: 20 seats/car
  - Capacity of VIP cars: 6 seats/car
  - Total Max. Transfer Ability: 2,000 passengers/hour
  - Conductors: 3
  - Engines: 2 x 411 kW (2 x 559 PS)
  - Transfer Time: ~5 minutes
  - Wind Speed Limit: 120 km/h
  - Total Cost: ~12 million euros
  - Manufacturer: Doppelmayr Seilbahnen S.A.
