= Hotel Mont Parnes =

Hotel and casino near Athens, Greece

Regency Casino Mont Parnes
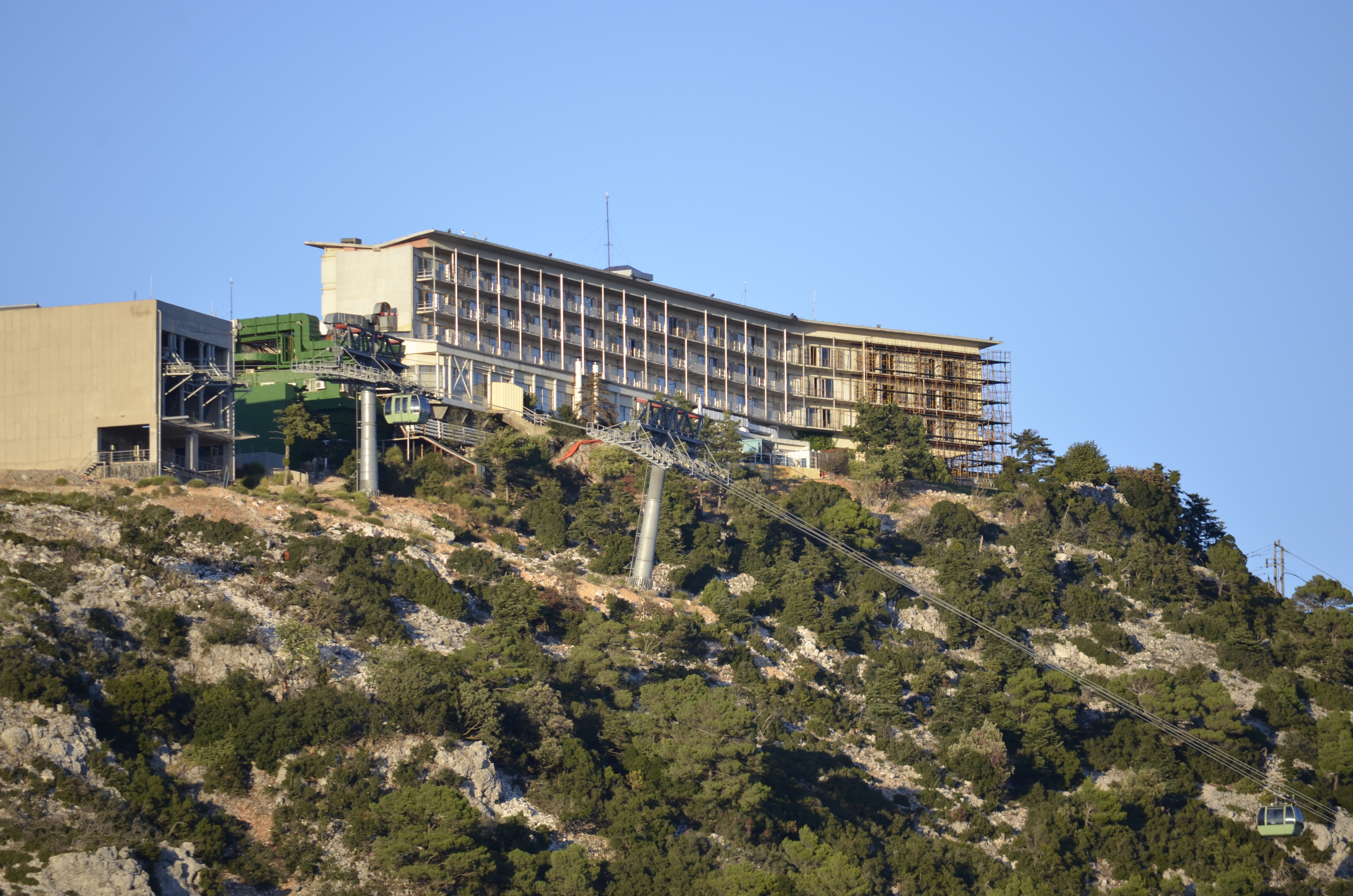
- Parnitha Casino in 2014
- Interactive map of the Regency Casino Mont Parnes area
- Former names: Hotel Mont Parnes

General information
- Type: Casino (formerly hotel)
- Architectural style: Post-war modernism
- Location: Greece
- Coordinates: 38°9′8″N 23°44′13″E
- Construction started: 1958
- Completed: 1961
- Inaugurated: June 17, 1961

Design and construction
- Architect: Pavlos Mylonas
- Main contractor: Aristeidis Alafouzos

Regency Casino Mont Parnes, also known as the Parnitha Casino, is a casino situated at Mount Parnitha north of Athens. Originally built as Hotel Mont Parnes, it was a luxury hotel designed by architect Pavlos Mylonas and was built between 1958 and 1961.

It was the first luxury hotel in the Attica region, but was not commercially successful. This would lead to casino being licensed on its premises in 1971, that would also become the first one ever in the Attica. Subsequently, an aerial tramway (the Parnitha Funitel) would be built in 1972 to help transport quests up to the hotel.

The hotel ceased operations in 1974, while Casino it would still continue to function. In 1984, Mont Parnes became the property of the Greek National Tourism Organization and would become privatized again in 2003.

== History ==
=== Construction and operation as a hotel ===
After the Greek National Tourism Organization was re-established in 1950, a series of hotels were designed throughout Greece to meet the growing tourist flows in the country, with the participation of notable Greek architects. In 1958, it was decided to build a luxury hotel on Parnitha, along with other facilities, such as bungalows, restaurants, a small open-air theater and sports facilities spread over an area of 800 acres. The program had the support of Prime Minister Konstantinos Karamanlis, who also suggested the name "Mont Parnes", as a nod to the French district of Montparnasse.

The design of the hotel was assigned to the architect Pavlos Mylonas, who had designed the Bafi Refuge in 1936. The construction was undertaken by the contractor and civil engineer Aristeidis Alafouzos. The initial budget for the building was 35–40 million drachmas, but the final cost amounted to 150 million, causing reactions in the press.

The hotel was inaugurated on 17 June 1961, in the presence of Konstantinos Karamanlis. It was the first luxury hotel to be opened at Attica region, beating the American Athens Hilton which began also began construction in 1958, but was opened later in 1963.

However, the hotel did not receive the expected attendance. Reportedly, the hotel had "more staff than visitors" in 1963. In the period 1962–63, its management was given to the company Chaire Rhore Hotels Greece S.A. and a Swiss hotel school began to operate on its premises. The hotel did not operate during the winter season of 1963–64, resulting in it once again becoming the subject of severe criticism. Reportedly Konstantinos Tsatsos, who cut the ribbon at the inauguration, would subsequently deem that the hotel was "a failure both artistically and financially."

=== Casino operation ===
In 1969, it was decided to operate a casino on the hotel premises - until then, casinos in Greece had only operated in Corfu and Rhodes. The operation of the casino was undertaken by the Cypriot businessman Frixos Dimitriou.

The casino was inaugurated in February 1971. A new building was constructed for its needs. In 1972, an aerial tramway was built by the Swiss company Haberger, which bypassed the curves of the road that went up to the hotel. This aerial tram would be later known as the Parnitha Funitel. The Mont Parnes hotel ceased operation in 1974, and only the casino continued to operate.

Reportedly, the first decade was the most successful period of the casino's existence. In 1984, the building passed into the possession of the Greek National Tourism Organization. In late 1980s, it was still considered one of the largest Casinos in Europe.

The structure was damaged by the 1999 Athens earthquake. The earthquake caused cracks in the building, the northwest wing deviated from the vertical, and the nightclub collapsed. The damage from the earthquake was compounded by theft and the abandonment of the hotel.

In 2001, a tender was held for the privatization of the complex. The call for interest was made in August 2001 and by December of the same year two proposals had been submitted, from the joint ventures "Casino Attica" and "Hyatt-Hellenic Technodomiki".

The auction took place in May 2002 and the consortium Hyatt-Hellenic Technodomiki won the bid, with a price of 92.1 million euros. The tender was awarded in August 2002 to Hyatt-Hellenic Technodomiki, with a final cost of 120 million euros. The sales contract was ratified in Parliament in March 2003 for 49% of the casino and its management. The "Casino Attica" consortium filed an unsuccessful lawsuit against the tender.

In 2003–04, the hotel's renovation began, and in 2005 the old cable car station was demolished and replaced with a new one, and there were plans to replace the building with a new one. These plans faced resistance and protests over preserving the historical building.

In 2008, three of the hotel's facades were deemed to be protected by the Central Council of Modern Monuments of the Ministry of Culture. But in 2010, it was deemed that the building needed to be demolished, as it was in verge of collapse. It was determined that a new complex was to be built in its place, which would follow the design cues of the original.

The attempt to move the casino to Maroussi was blocked the Greek High Court in January 2021, but laws involved the transfer were changed by a Greek Parliament vote, allowing the transfer to proceed.

In July 2025, Regency Entertainment, which operates Hotel Mont Parnes and several venues in Thessaloniki, was granted a licence by the Hellenic Gaming Commission to operate online casinos in Greece in partnership with SkillOnNet.

== Features ==
The building was primarily designed by Pavlos Mylonas. There is a plaque in the hotel lounge that contained the names of designers and contributors of project, which include; Yannis Tsarouchis, Yannis Moralis, Nikos Hadjikyriakos-Ghikas, Panagiotis Tetsis, Evgenios Spatharis and others.

It is located at an altitude of 1,078 meters above sea level and has a panoramic view of the Attica Basin. It occupies 90 acres of land, is five-story tall and has 240 rooms.

The building hosted a swimming pool which was designed by Nikos Hadjikyriakos-Ghikas. It also hosted salons, such as the "Macedonian Salon" that was a copy of the interior of Schwartz mansion in Ampelakia, as well as the "Hydra Salon" that contained various furniture, tapestries and works of art, which bear the signatures of great Greek artists. Additionally, it has a peculiar spiral staircase, which was to be preserved during the renovation plans.

The 1999 earthquake caused serious damage to the building. Building's basements, hotel rooms, public and auxiliary areas, as well as the nightclub had collapsed completely. Additionally, the north-eastern wing had become detached from the rest of the building. The restoration of the NE wing was impossible and it was deemed that it would have needed to be demolished and then re-built.

== Observaciones ==
La fuente añadida identifica directamente a Pavlos Mylonas como arquitecto del Hotel Mont Parnes.

== In popular culture ==
The Parnitha Casino was featured in the 1998 James Bond continuation novel The Facts of Death. There it is called Casino au Mont Parnes and is located atop of Mount Parnitha, like the Parnitha Casino.

== See also ==
- Hard Rock Hotel & Casino Athens
