= Decelea =

Ancient Athenian administrative unit

Coordinates: 38.1100°N 23.7786°E

Decelea (Ancient Greek: Δεκέλεια, Dekéleia), was a deme and ancient village in northern Attica serving as a trade route connecting Euboea with Athens, Greece. It was situated near the entrance of the eastern pass across Mount Parnes, which leads from the northeastern part of the Athenian plain to Oropus, and from thence both to Tanagra on the one hand, and to Delium and Chalcis on the other. It was situated about 120 stadia from Athens, and the same distance from the frontiers of Boeotia. It was visible from Athens and from its heights the ships entering the harbour of Piraeus were visible as well.

== History ==
It was originally one of the twelve cities of Attica. The historian Herodotus reports that Decelea's citizens enjoyed a special relationship with Sparta. The Spartans took control of Decelea around 413 BC. With advice from Alcibiades in 415 BC, the former Athenian general who was wanted on Athenian charges of religious crimes, the Spartans and their allies, under king Agis II, fortified Decelea as a major military post in the later stage of the Peloponnesian War, giving them control of rural Attica and cutting off the primary land route for food imports. This was a serious blow to Athens, which was concurrently being beaten in the Sicilian Expedition it had undertaken in the west.

The Spartan military presence in Attica, in a deviation from previous policy where Spartans returned home for the winter months, was maintained year-round. Spartan patrols through the Attic countryside strained the Athenian cavalry and curtailed the ability of Athens to continue exploiting the Laurium silver mines in southeastern Attica that were an important source of income. Thucydides estimated that 20,000 slaves, many of them skilled workers, escaped to Decelea, from 413 until the close of the Peloponnesian War in 404 BC. Xenophon reports briefly on these events.

Scholars have identified the site of the Spartan fort as the site of Palaiokastro, now marked by the tombs of the Greek royal family, in the Tatoi national forest east of Mt. Parnitha. A substantial rubble circuit wall (about 2 m wide) has been traced, with Classical rooftiles and other evidence of occupation. This location fits the description of Thucydides as midway between Athens and Boeotia, visible from Athens and commanding the plain of Attica. The site controls what was once a major ancient road, usable by carts, connecting Athens to the grain port of Oropus.

== See also ==
- List of ancient Greek cities
- Tatoi Palace

== Sources ==
- Fine, John V. A. The Ancient Greeks: A Critical History. Harvard University Press, 1983.
- McGregor, Malcolm F. The Athenians and their Empire. Vancouver: University of British Columbia Press, 1987.
- McCredie, James R. Fortified military camps in Attica. Hesperia Supplement XI, 1966.
