= Bafi Refuge =

Refuge in Mount Parnitha National Park, Greece

Bafi
- Μπάφι
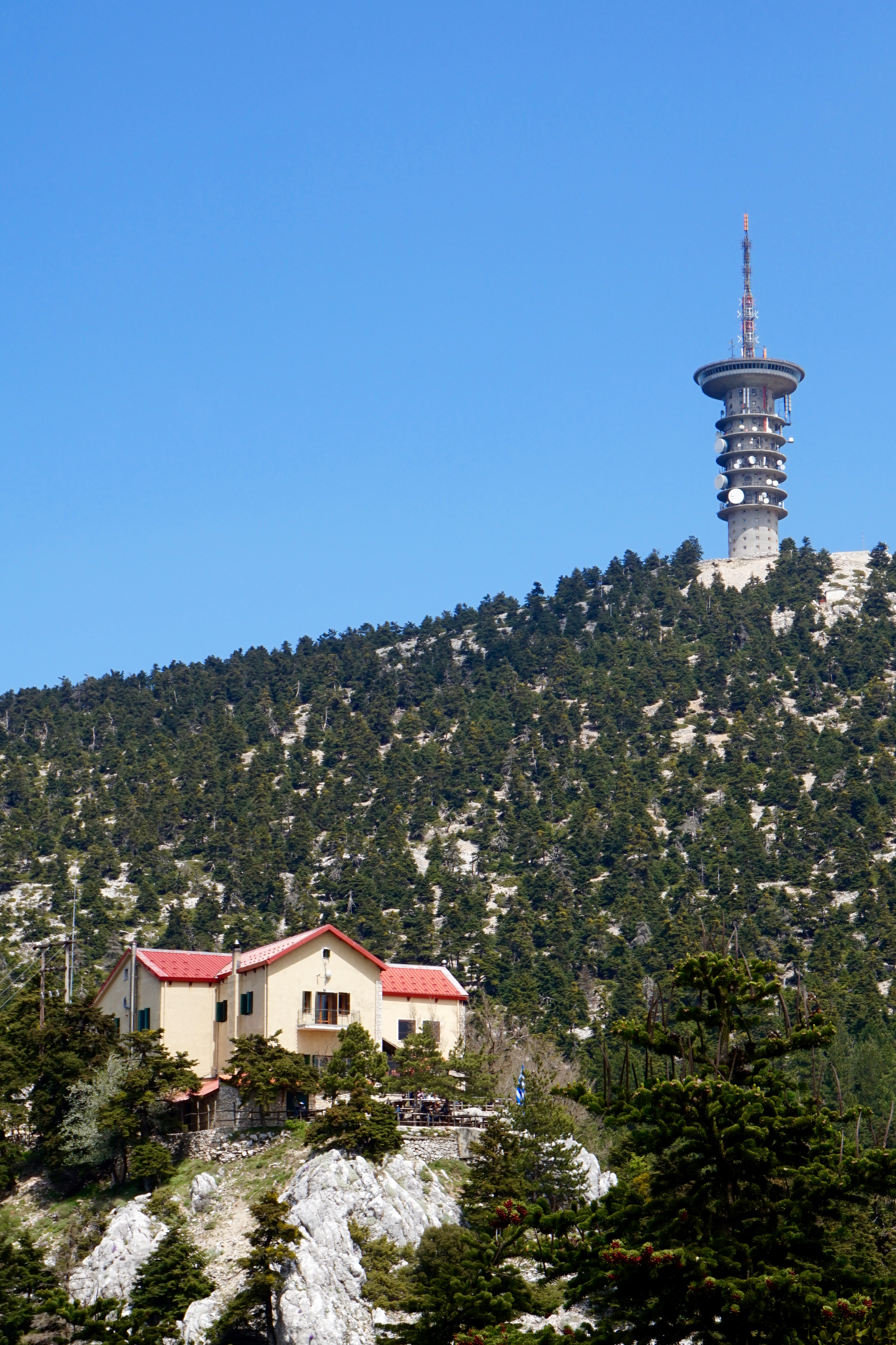

Highest point
- Elevation: 1,160 m (3,810 ft)
- Prominence: 10 to 15 km, north to south approx. 10 km from east to west
- Listing: National park
- Coordinates: 38°10′3″N 23°43′38″E

Geography
- Location: north of Athens, Greece
- Parent range: Parnitha

Climbing
- Easiest route: climb

The Bafi Refuge (also spelt Mpafi) belongs to the Greek Mountaineering Club, E.O.S. Athens founded in 1928 in the Mount Parnitha National Park, at an altitude of 1160m, roughly 2.5 km from Mont Parness, inside the national park. Ιn April 1937 the refuge's foundation stone was laid. The first part was completed in Autumn of 1939 with money that was collected mainly by the members of the Mountaineering Club, but also other affiliated associations. Paths begin from the shelter leaving in all directions, which can offer small and easy walks of half and one hour or long and difficult walks for the fitter.

Access to the refuge is from the street that goes up Parnitha to the casino “Mont Parnes”, or from a marked path which begins from the car park of the cable car and via the ravine of Choynis, leading to the shelter. Also, Bathis Square buses of line 714 of OASA leave for the Casino of Parnitha.

Today, the refuge is open all year round, it has organised cooking and it offers homemade food, refreshments and drinks. It provides the possibility of overnight stay, with three dormitories of 10, 20 and 30 places, three rooms with four beds, and one room in the loft of the shelter with two beds. During the winter there is central heating.
