= Parnitha =

Mountain range in Attica, Greece

- Πάρνηθα
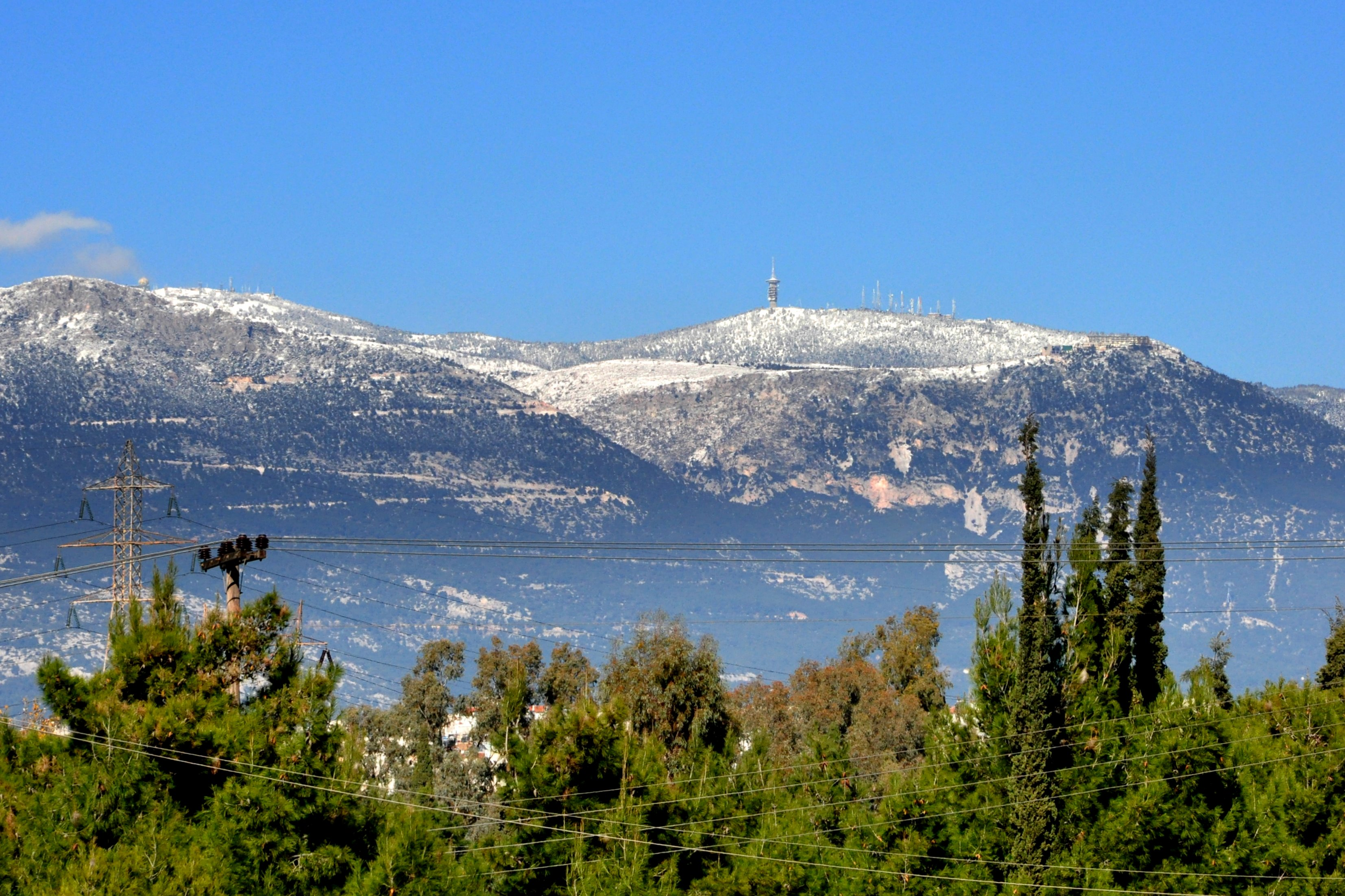
- Parnitha as seen from Nea Filadelfeia, Athens

Highest point
- Elevation: 1,413 m (4,636 ft)
- Prominence: 1,127 m (3,698 ft)
- Listing: Ribu, National park
- Coordinates: 38.1734°N 23.7174°E

Geography
- Location: north of Athens, Greece
- Parent range: Parnitha

Climbing
- Easiest route: climb

Mount Parnitha (Greek: Πάρνηθα, pronounced [ˈparniθa], Katharevousa and Ancient Greek: Πάρνης Parnis/Parnes; sometimes Parnetha) is a lightly forested mountain range north of Athens, the highest on the peninsula of Attica, with an elevation of 1,413 m, and a summit known as Karavola (Καραβόλα). Much of the mountain is designated a national park, and is a protected habitat for wildfowl, first created in 1961. The summit is located 18 km north of Acharnes and about 30 km north of the Athens city center. The mountain covers approximately 250 km^{2} of land. Other peaks include Mavrovouni (Μαυροβούνι), Ornio (1,350 m), Area (1,160 m), Avgo or Avgho (1,150 m), and Xerovouni (Ξεροβούνι, meaning "dry mountain": 1,120 m). It also has two shelters Mpafi and Flampouri. The name of the mountain dates back to ancient times, when it was under the ancient demes of Acharnae and Decelea.

== Geography ==
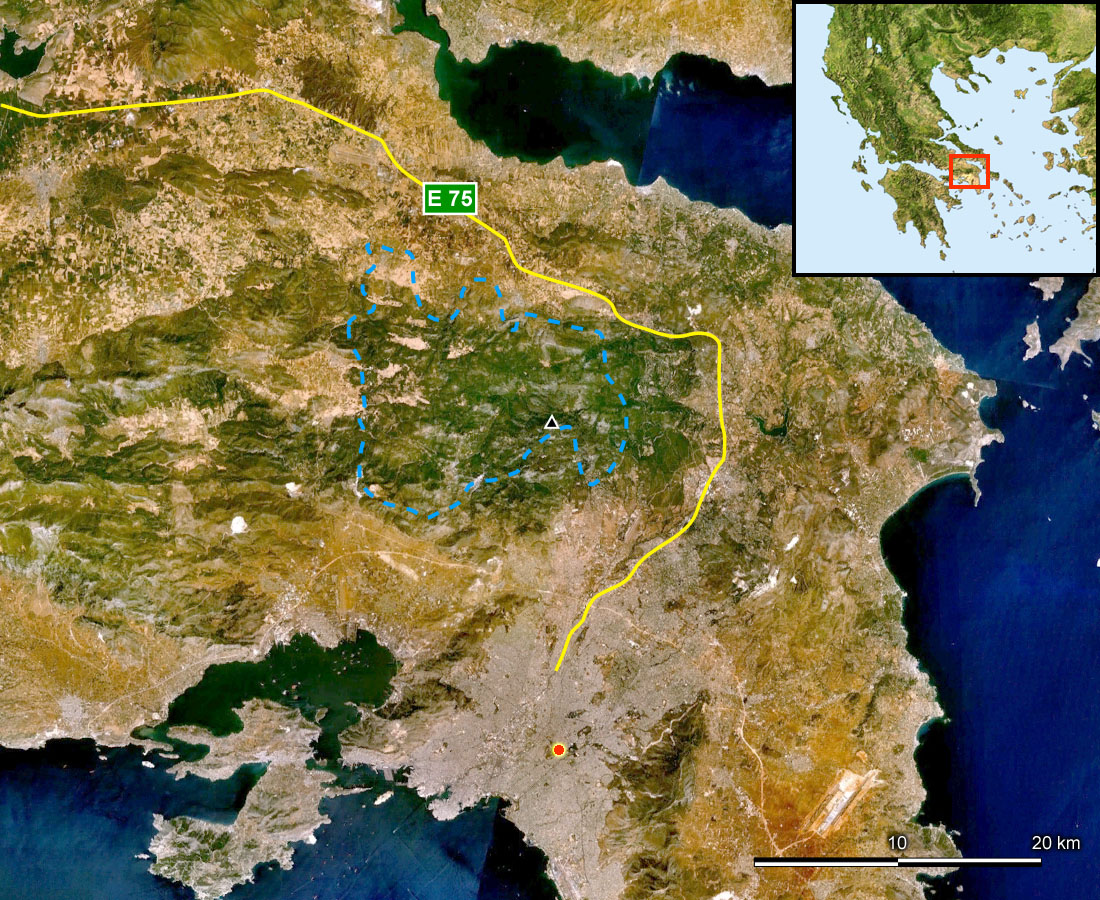
A satellite view of Parnitha along with most of Attica. The boundary of the mount proper is marked in light blue while its foothills are visible as the green areas immediately adjacent to the line.

Towns surrounding the mountain include Aspropyrgos, Fyli, Acharnes, Varymbombi, Thrakomakedones, Dekeleia, Avlona and Agios Stefanos as well as the settlement of Agios Merkourios. The A1 motorway (E75) surrounds the northern and eastern part of the mountain along with the Cephissus river, while the Attiki Odos motorway (A6) runs to its south. The mountain offers panoramic views of the mountains northeast of Parnitha, Penteli to the east, the Hymettus to the southeast, the Aigaleo to the south and another to the west; from its summit, one can also see the Thriasian Plain, the Saronic Gulf including the islands of Salamina, Aigina and the North, the South Euboean Gulfs and island of Euboea, and most of central and northern Greater Athens. The view during clear days can extend to northern Boeotia and the Peloponnese.

=== Climate ===
Parnitha mountain has a warm-summer mediterranean climate (Csb) with frequent snowfalls in winter and pleasant temperatures in summer. The mountain is significantly wetter than areas of east and southern Attica. The mountain was also affected by several major blizzards, including two in 2005 and 2006, stranding cars and closing roads, as well as the cable car.

Climate data for Parnitha (1230m asl)
Month	Jan	Feb	Mar	Apr	May	Jun	Jul	Aug	Sep	Oct	Nov	Dec	Year
Mean daily maximum °C (°F)	3.7 (38.7)	5.4 (41.7)	7.1 (44.8)	11.8 (53.2)	16.9 (62.4)	20.5 (68.9)	22.9 (73.2)	22.7 (72.9)	19.5 (67.1)	14.2 (57.6)	10.0 (50.0)	6.0 (42.8)	13.4 (56.1)
Daily mean °C (°F)	1.6 (34.9)	3.2 (37.8)	4.5 (40.1)	8.8 (47.8)	13.8 (56.8)	17.5 (63.5)	19.8 (67.6)	19.7 (67.5)	16.5 (61.7)	11.7 (53.1)	7.9 (46.2)	3.9 (39.0)	10.7 (51.3)
Mean daily minimum °C (°F)	−0.4 (31.3)	0.9 (33.6)	1.9 (35.4)	5.8 (42.4)	10.6 (51.1)	14.4 (57.9)	16.7 (62.1)	16.7 (62.1)	13.6 (56.5)	9.1 (48.4)	5.7 (42.3)	1.7 (35.1)	8.1 (46.5)
Average rainfall mm (inches)	74.9 (2.95)	70.4 (2.77)	72.8 (2.87)	46.5 (1.83)	45.7 (1.80)	41.5 (1.63)	11.8 (0.46)	8.2 (0.32)	46.5 (1.83)	73.0 (2.87)	96.4 (3.80)	132.4 (5.21)	720.1 (28.34)
Source: National Observatory of Athens Monthly Bulletins (Dec 2009 – Apr 2023)

== Ecology ==
Forests of Aleppo pine cover all slopes beneath 1,000 m altitude, and are often threatened by forest fires, such as happened in 2005, 2007, 2021 and 2023. Above 1,000 m it is covered principally in Greek Fir, grasses and shrubbery, and beneath 300 m mainly farmlands and suburban housing to the east. About 1,000 species of plants can be found on the mountain, including crocus and tulips, and the mountain also provides a native habitat to its red deer (Cervus elaphus), which were known in ancient times. After the traumatic fire in 2007 (see below), they are even scarcer. Several large mines lie to the northwest, and the ore from them was shipped to a nearby factory in industrial areas. Further forest fires occurred in the summers of 2021 and 2023 leaving only northern parts of the mountain forest unburned.

== Historical monuments and places of interest ==
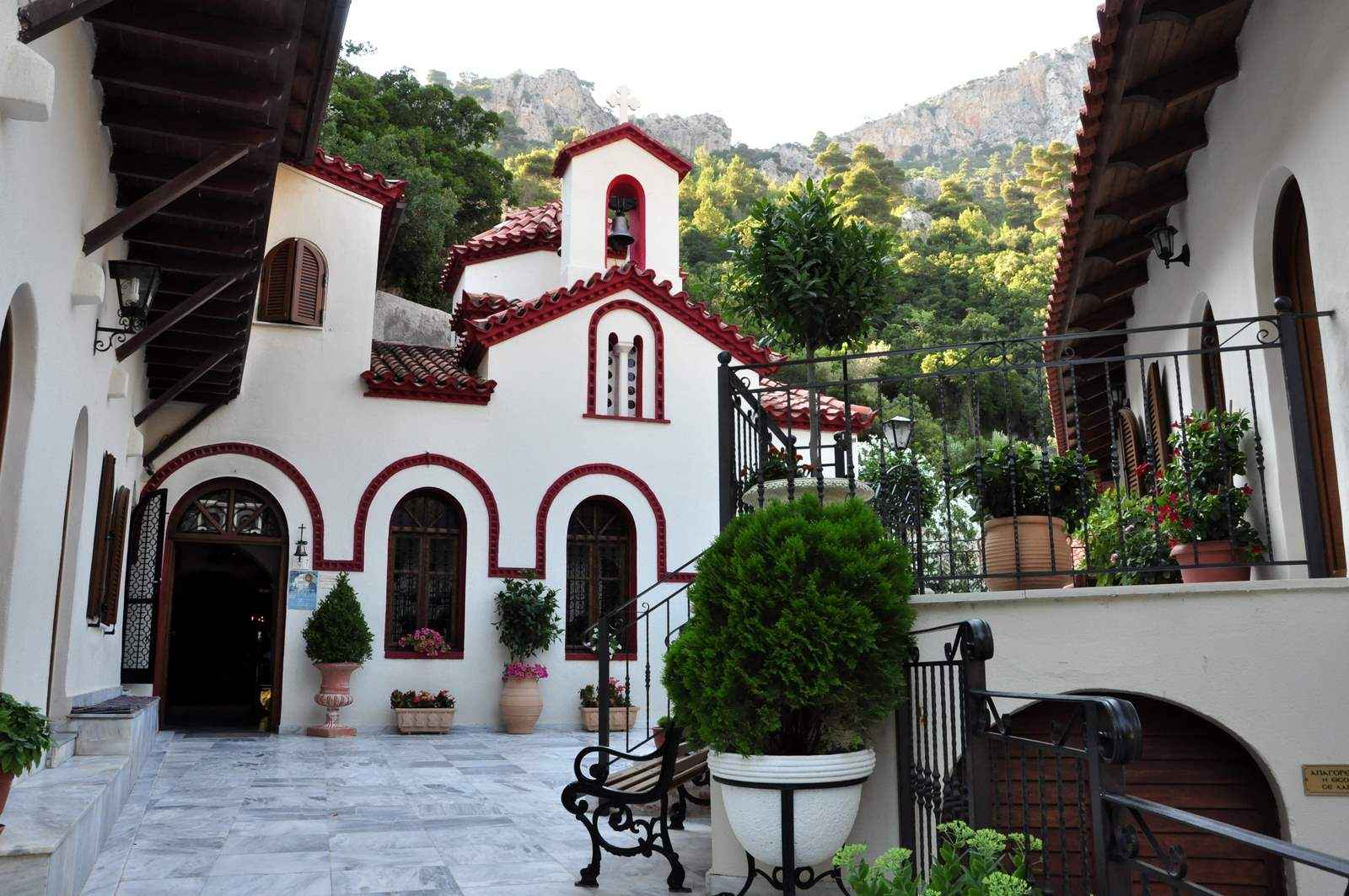
Monastery of Kleiston in Parnitha

Parnitha has several places of archaeological interest. In antiquity, several fortresses had been built on the mountain, for the defense of the peninsula of Attica and more specifically classical Athens against the Boeotians and others enemies from the north. Today some fortresses are kept in good condition such as the Phyle fortress, at a height of 687 meters in the west of Parnitha. Other notable fortresses are the Panakton, in the area of Dervenochoria and Eleutherae fortress near Mount Cithaeron. Dekeleia was also an important fortress on the site of modern-day former royal palace in Tatoi, and the fort of Limiko was situated deep inside the mountain, just north of its peak.

A notable monument of later periods is the Monastery of Kleiston. It is a Byzantine monastery dated from 13th century. It is mentioned by Pope Innocent IV in 1209 with the name Monastery of Kyras. Southeast of Parnitha, in a dense forest, is Tatoi Palace. It was the palace of the Greek royal family and it was built in 19th century. Today it is abandoned.

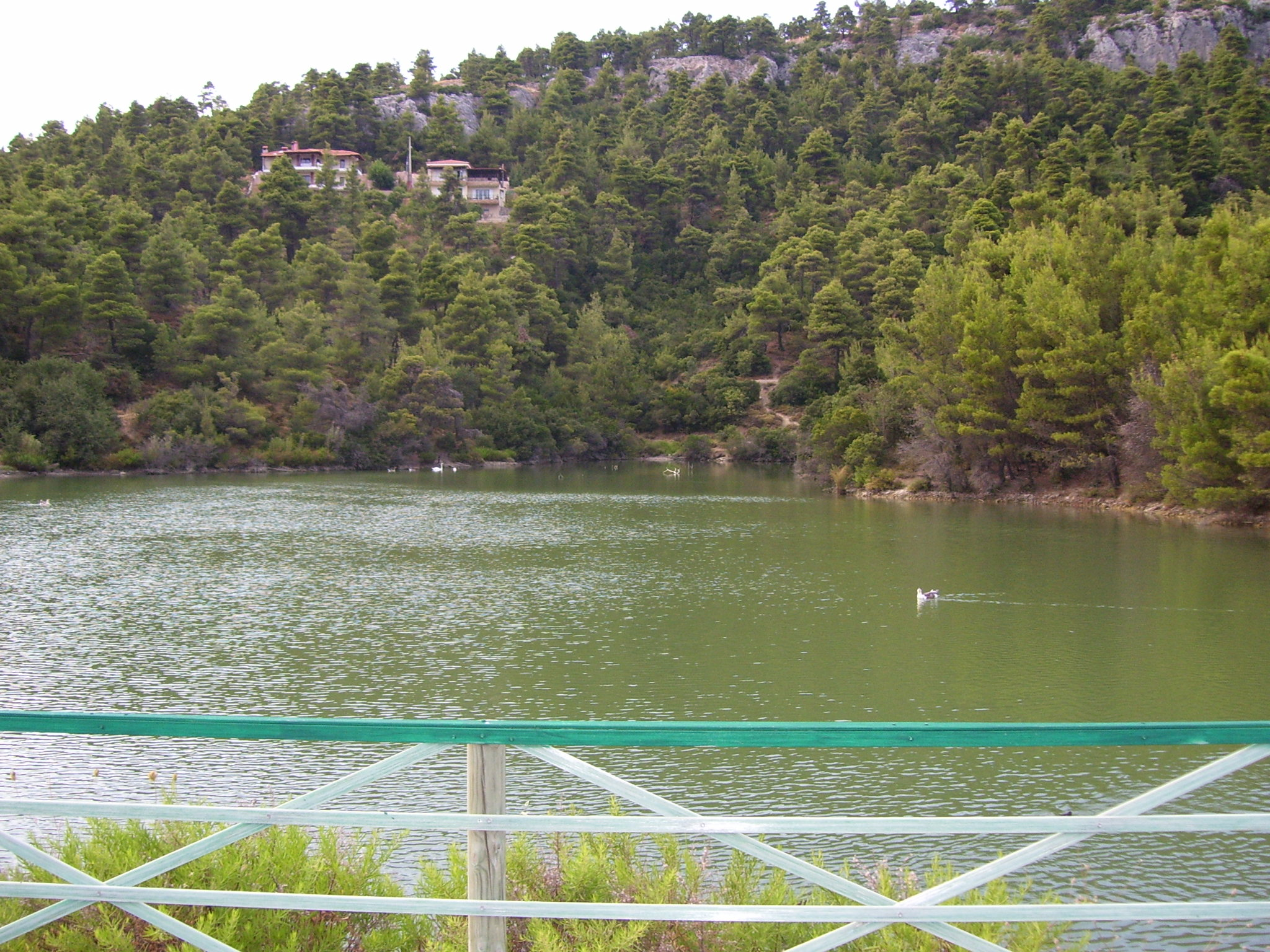
Beletsi Lake on the east slopes of Parnitha

Parnitha has also natural monuments. The cave of Panas is on the west slopes of the mountain at a height of 750 meters. It was a worship site in antiquity. Near the cave there is the steep gorge of Gouras and the gorge of Keladonas river. A beautiful site of the mountain is Beletsi Lake, on the east slopes of the mountain, near Afidnes, and it is important place for migratory birds. In general, the national park is known as the "lungs of Athens".

== Modern facilities ==
A casino, the Regency Casino Mont Parnes, is located near the top of the mountain and is served by a suspended cable car. Two shelters are also on Parnitha, the most known of which is Mpafi. A series of trails are found around the mountain as well as forest roads, and also on the mountain is Athens' second transmitter, broadcasting radio and television since the mid-1950s, across the range of television channels from ERT, ANT1, Mega, Alter and more, to satellite, including Super Sport, Seven X and Filmnet, and a multitude of radio including ERA Radio, Klik FM, ANT1 Radio, Ciao FM, Rhythmos, Super Sport FM, Top FM and others. The supporting road connection was paved in the mid-20th century.

== 2007 wildfire ==
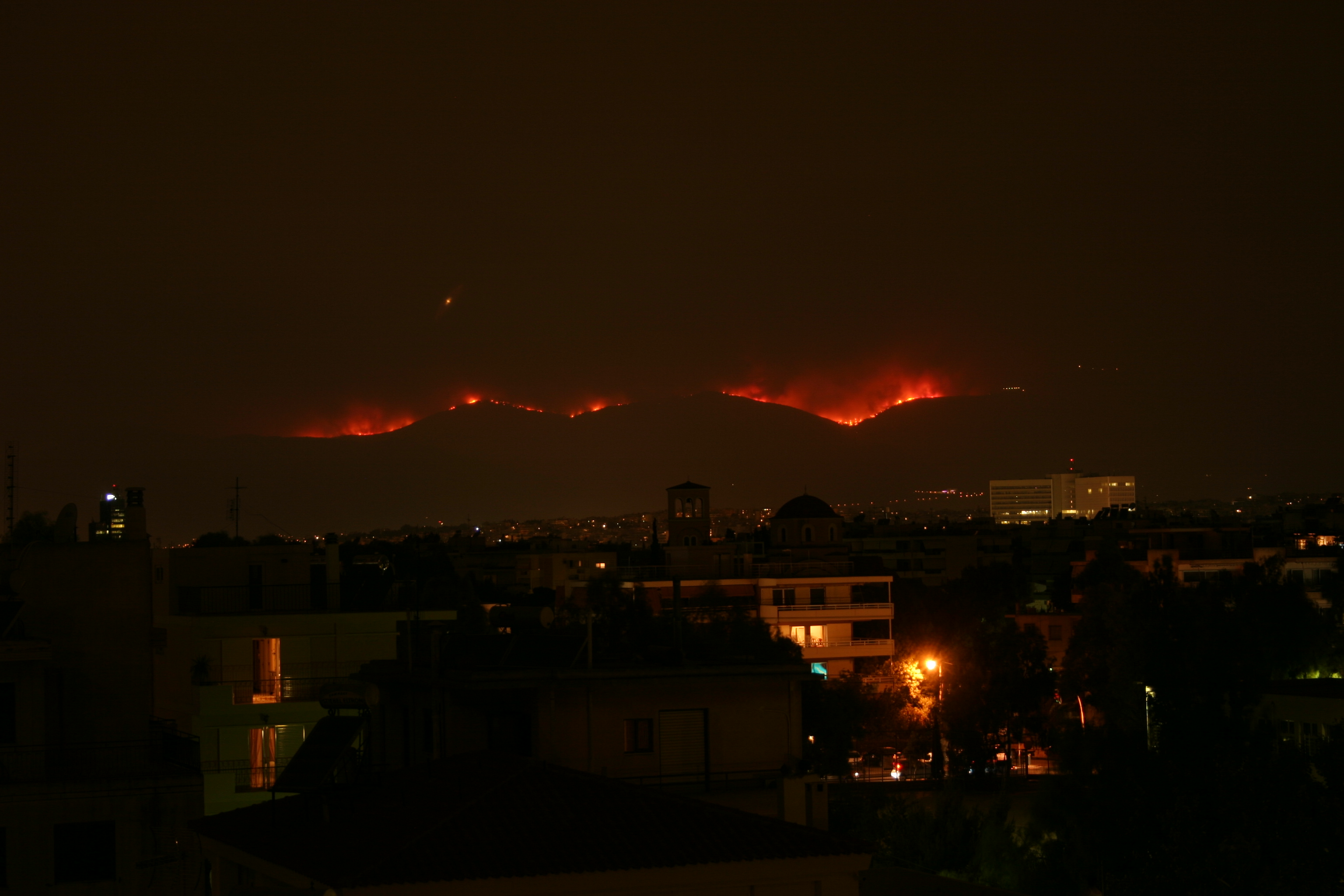
View of the fire from the East

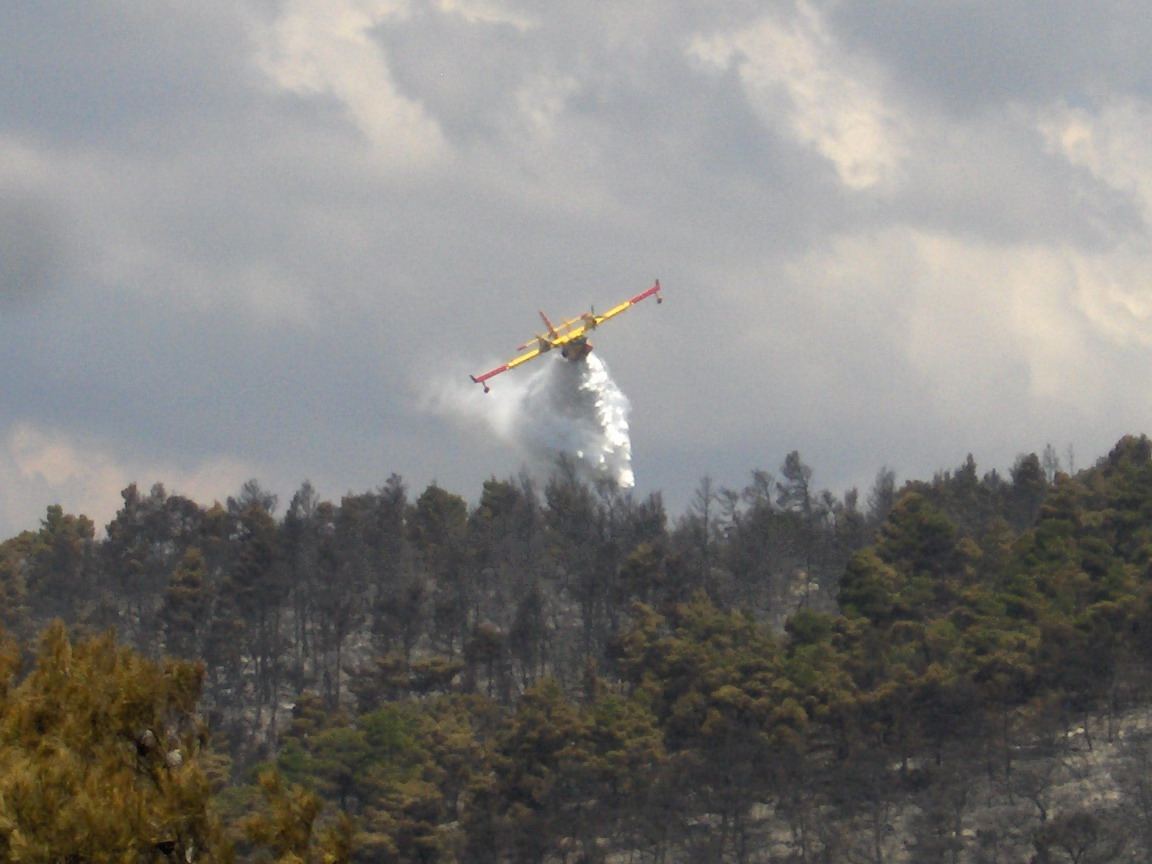
Parnitha during 2007 wildfire

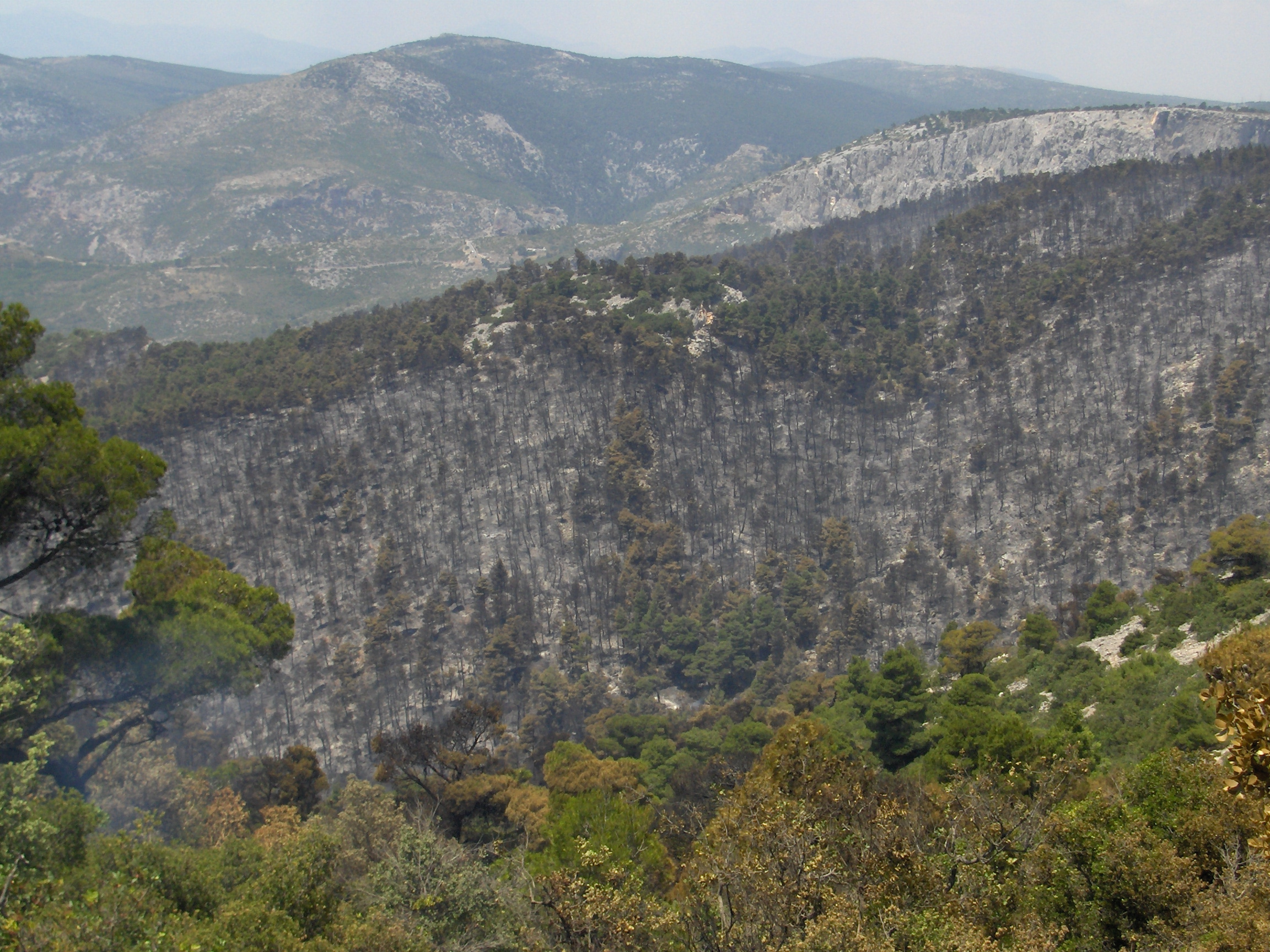
A very small part of the burned area

Parnitha suffered extensive damage from a wildfire on Thursday, 28 June 2007 around the morning and noon hours, continuing for several days and burning approximately 56 km^{2} of land; one of the worst recorded wildfires in the prefecture after that of Penteli. The magnitude of the devastation was unforeseen. A smaller fire had, however, taken place in the 1960s.

The fire consumed dozens of acres of forest across two prefectures. Firefighters, helicopters, and planes were brought into action across the mountain area and its edges fighting the enormous blaze, which took days to contain. It spread rapidly with the help of intense winds, and intensified into the northwestern edges of Greater Athens, including both Ano Liosia and towns and villages such as Fyli, near Thrakomakedones, Pyli and both Skoura and Schimatari north of the mountain. From Athens, inhabitants could see the mountainside burning throughout the night. In Schimatari in Boeotia, it ruined several acres of forest and businesses. The fire claimed 80% of the rare Greek Fir and Aleppo pine forest, 150 animals of the red deer population (an endangered species), birds, and other rare animals. The remains of the green firs and pines are scattered around its edges. The smoke from the massive destruction formed a line that traveled east over Attica, southern Euboea, Chios, to the edge of Turkey, approximately 350 km away.

On June 30, the fire was mostly contained and warnings of new fires were reduced, as only a few fires were slowly burning sporadically in separate parts of the mountain. The main blaze was completely put out on July 1. At the edges of the burnt parts, several fires slowly continued to burn in sections after June 30, with a slow expansion.

Scientists estimate that the area's recovery time may be as long as a century. They predict the effect of the loss will only begin to be felt in the coming years; the air may become a little stale and the already known problems of air pollution and smog in Athens may reappear and intensify. Temperatures could also rise and flooding may become a problem for several years. The Ministry of Environment is currently considering a conclusive reforestation program, while many citizens marched on the streets of Athens to express their disapproval of the handling of the situation. More recently, reforestation has been underway, and the government will be receiving tens of thousands of trees to be planted around the mountains, most of them from outside the country, albeit at a small scale thus far.

Investigations are still underway as to the fire's cause. One scenario suggests a transformer belonging to a major power line exploded due to overuse and overheating by the 47C heatwave, some days before the fire. Another holds that this was one of the many arson attacks that have claimed forested land in Greece over recent decades to illegally clear formerly-protected land for expanded real estate.

== See also ==
- List of mountains in Greece
- National parks in Greece
