= Thrakomakedones =

Thrakomakedones Θρακομακεδόνες
- Municipal unit
- Location within the regional unit

- Location within Greece
- Coordinates: 38°7′N 23°45′E
- Country: Greece
- Administrative region: Attica
- Regional unit: East Attica
- Municipality: Acharnes

Area
  - Municipal unit: 3.550 km^{2} (1.371 sq mi)
- Elevation: 360 m (1,180 ft)

Population (2021)
  - Municipal unit: 7,312
  - Municipal unit density: 2,060/km^{2} (5,335/sq mi)
- Time zone: UTC+2 (EET)
  - Summer (DST): UTC+3 (EEST)
- Postal code: 136 76
- Area code: 210 243
- Vehicle registration: Z
- Website: www.thrakomakedones.gr

Thrakomakedones (Greek: Θρακομακεδόνες from Thrace and Macedonia), is a town in the regional unit East Attica, in Attica region, Greece. It is a northern suburb of Athens. Since the 2011 local government reform it is part of the municipality Acharnes, of which it is a municipal unit. The municipal unit has an area of 3.550 km^{2}.

== Overview ==
Thrakomakedones is situated in the southern foothills of the Parnitha mountain, at the northern edge of the Athens conurbation. It is 5 km northeast of Acharnes and 16 km north of Athens city centre. The 1999 Athens earthquake affected Thrakomakedones, causing severe damage to several houses and a school. During a heatwave, on 7 August 2021 wildfires affecting Greece were spreading towards Thrakomakedones; many people left their homes.

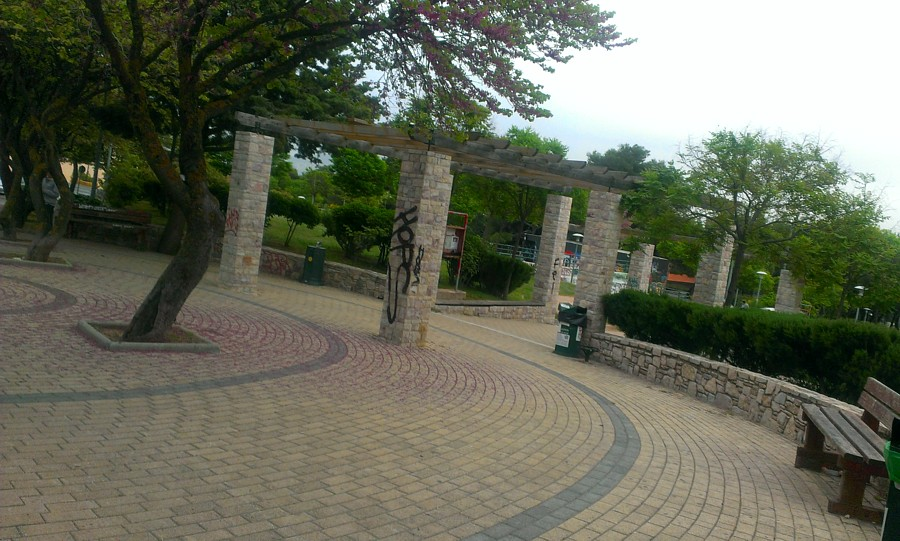

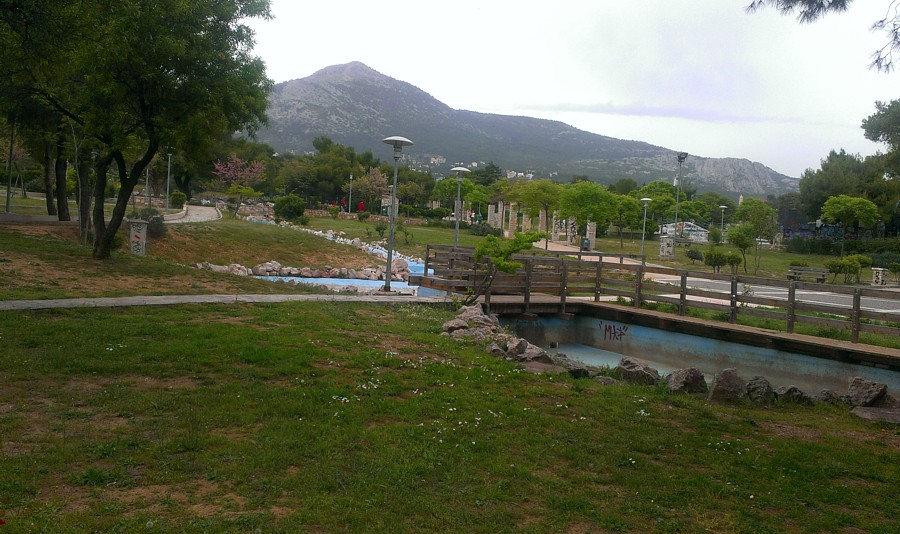

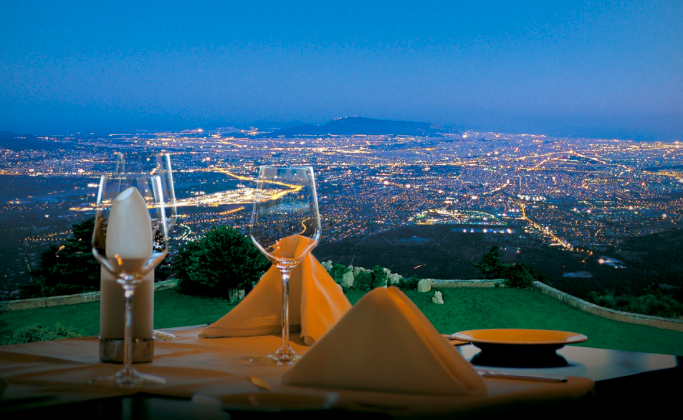

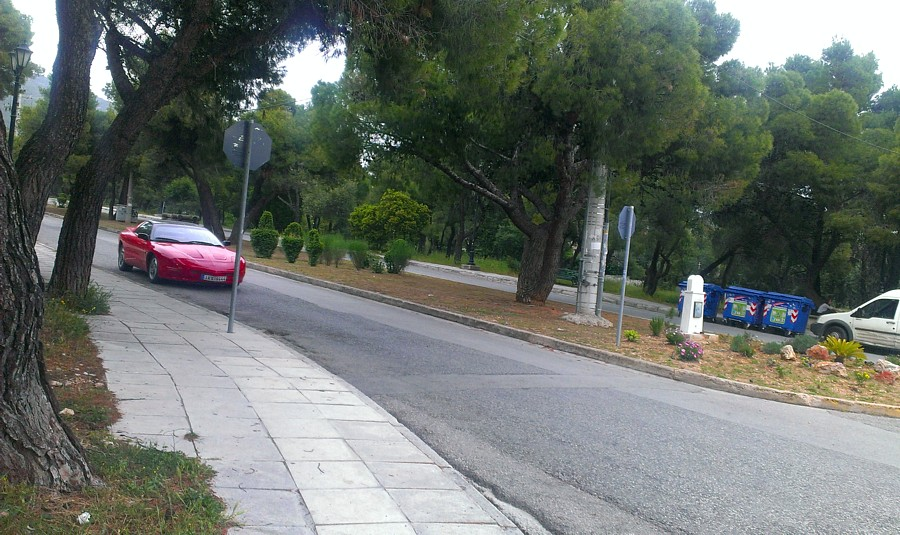

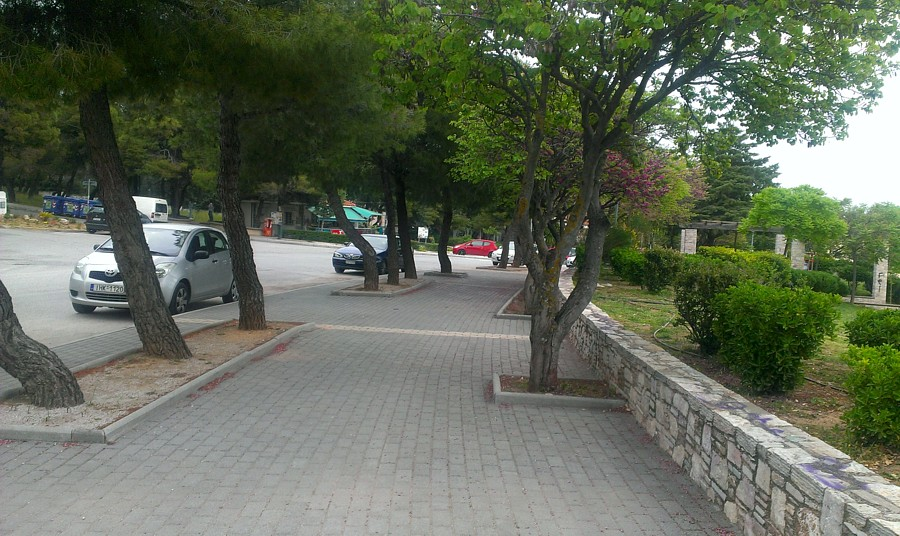

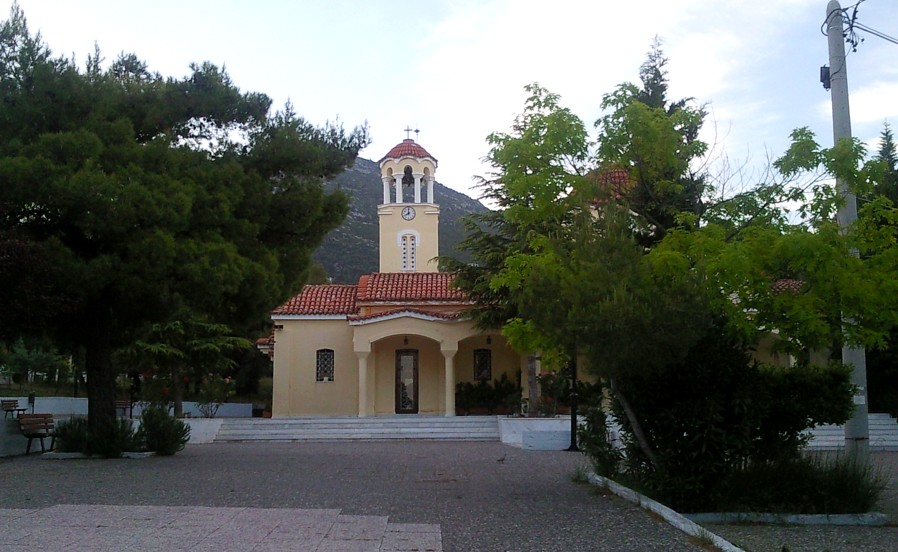

== Climate ==
Thrakomakedones has a hot-summer Mediterranean climate (Köppen climate classification: Csa). Thrakomakedones experiences hot, relatively dry summers and cool, wet winters.

Climate data for Thrakomakedones
Month	Jan	Feb	Mar	Apr	May	Jun	Jul	Aug	Sep	Oct	Nov	Dec	Year
Mean daily maximum °C (°F)	10.03 (50.05)	11.03 (51.85)	13.61 (56.50)	17.56 (63.61)	22.81 (73.06)	27.55 (81.59)	31.96 (89.53)	31.51 (88.72)	28.14 (82.65)	21.64 (70.95)	15.47 (59.85)	11.08 (51.94)	20.20 (68.36)
Daily mean °C (°F)	6.24 (43.23)	6.77 (44.19)	8.79 (47.82)	13.11 (55.60)	18.08 (64.54)	22.98 (73.36)	26.01 (78.82)	25.65 (78.17)	21.07 (69.93)	15.77 (60.39)	10.81 (51.46)	7.55 (45.59)	15.28 (59.50)
Mean daily minimum °C (°F)	1.92 (35.46)	2.17 (35.91)	3.51 (38.32)	6.39 (43.50)	10.94 (51.69)	15.47 (59.85)	18.22 (64.80)	17.67 (63.81)	14.76 (58.57)	10.46 (50.83)	6.72 (44.10)	3.82 (38.88)	9.06 (48.31)
Average precipitation mm (inches)	63.55 (2.50)	55.45 (2.18)	69.13 (2.72)	44.23 (1.74)	27.02 (1.06)	12.42 (0.49)	13.49 (0.53)	11.61 (0.46)	16.65 (0.66)	60.04 (2.36)	81.60 (3.21)	78.83 (3.10)	534.02 (21.02)
Mean monthly sunshine hours	126.37	140.86	174.39	208.27	262.11	334.63	340.98	332.03	263.99	205.94	129.69	103.54	2,641.1
Source: Hellenic National Meteorological Service

== Historical population ==
Year	Population
1981	1,101
1991	3,135
2001	4,780
2011	6,200
2021	7,312

== Notable people ==
- Apostolos Kaldaras, musician.
- Vicky Moscholiou, singer .
- Chris Menidiatis, singer.
- Eleni Tsaligopoulou, singer.
- Filippos Pliatsikas, singer and founder of Pyx Lax band.
- Costas Tsoclis, artist.
- Demos Veroukas, millionaire businessman and owner of Bazaar Supermarkets.
- George Konitopoulos, singer.
- Nikos Sidiropoulos, former footballer, dentist, and editor.
- Dimitris Kontominas, millionaire businessman and owner of Interamerican and Alpha TV
- Charalambos Crommidas, millionaire businessman and owner of Fortis Mantis Group.
- Boutaris family, politicians and owners of Boutari Wine Company.
- Konstantinos Kostoulas, owner of Kostoulas group.
- Dimitris Kostopoulos, millionaire businessman and owner of Mevaco.
- Dimitris Koutras, millionaire constructor and former shareholder and head of Ellaktor and Intrakat.

== Twin towns ==
- Albanella (Italy)

== See also ==
- List of municipalities of Attica
