= Fyli =

Fyli Φυλή
- Municipality
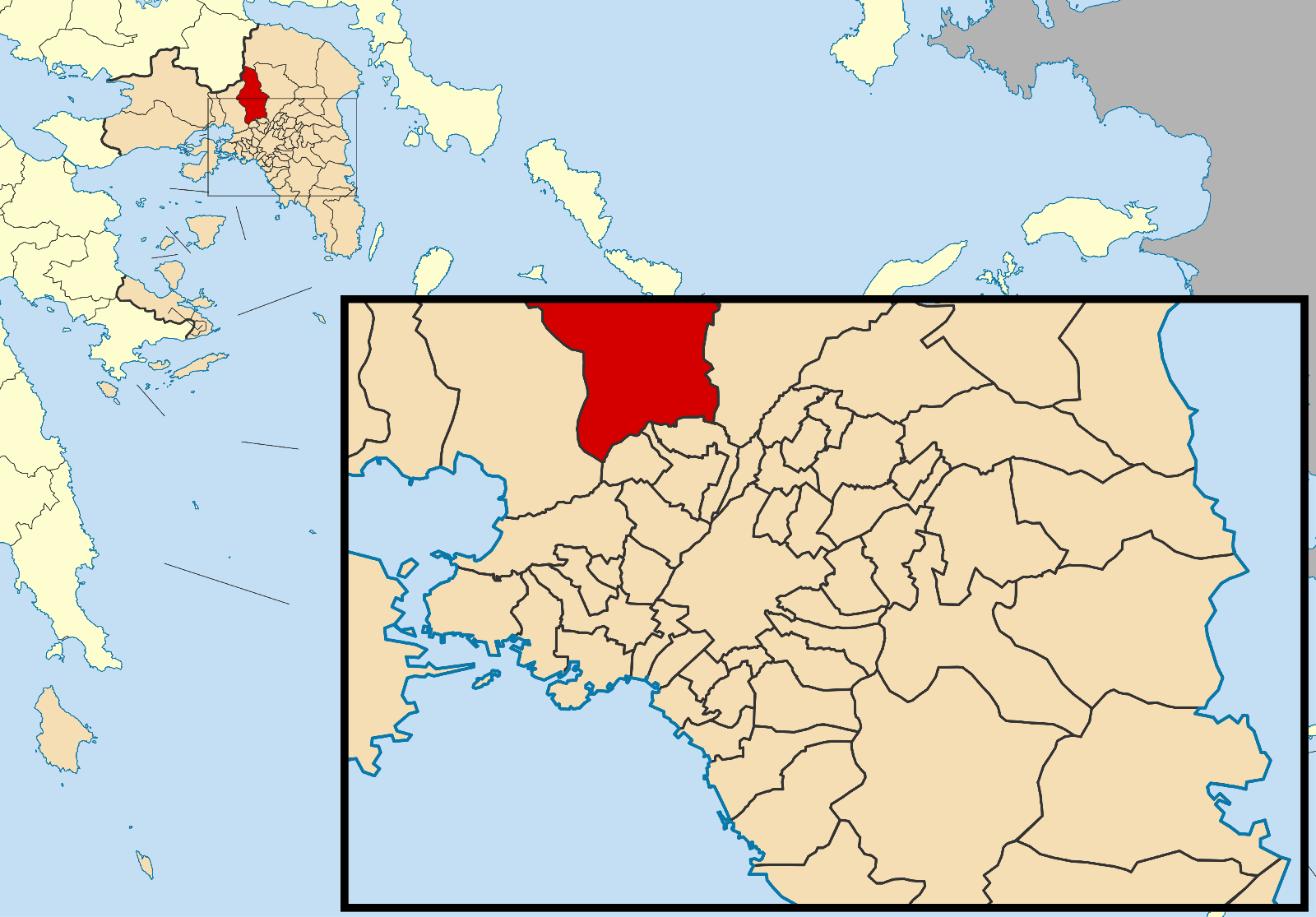

- Location within Greece
- Coordinates: 38°6′N 23°40′E
- Country: Greece
- Administrative region: Attica
- Regional unit: West Attica

Government
  - Mayor: Christos Pappous (since 2014)

Area
  - Municipality: 109.13 km^{2} (42.14 sq mi)
  - Municipal unit: 69.28 km^{2} (26.75 sq mi)
- Elevation: 330 m (1,080 ft)

Population (2021)
  - Municipality: 48,157
  - Density: 441.28/km^{2} (1,142.9/sq mi)
  - Municipal unit: 3,209
  - Municipal unit density: 46.32/km^{2} (120.0/sq mi)
- Time zone: UTC+2 (EET)
  - Summer (DST): UTC+3 (EEST)
- Postal code: 133 xx
- Area code: 210
- Vehicle registration: Z (as of 2006)

Fyli (Greek: Φυλή, pronounced [fiˈli]), before 1915: Χασιά, Chasia) is a town and a municipality in the northwestern part of Attica, Greece. It lies in the northeastern corner of the West Attica regional unit, and is a suburb of Athens. The seat of the municipality is the town Ano Liosia. Within bounds of the town is the ancient Athenian fortress of Phyle.

== Municipality ==
The municipality Fyli was formed at the 2011 local government reform by the merger of the following 3 former municipalities, that became municipal units:

- Ano Liosia
- Fyli
- Zefyri

The municipality has an area of 109.128 km^{2}, the municipal unit 69.281 km^{2}.

== History ==
A group of Athenian exiles, led by Thrasybulus, seized Phyle in the 404 BC Battle of Phyle. They went on to defeat the Spartan garrison at the Battle of Munichia near Piraeus.

The medieval name Chasia is first attested in 1209 as casale Cassas, as property of the Latin Archbishopric of Athens. The town is mentioned as Haşa in the Seyahatnâme of Evliya Çelebi which he visited in 1668. He mentions that it is and Arvanite village with 100 houses and that 50 houses of the village are tax-exempt because they are tasked to protect the mountain pass.

The village has historically been an Arvanite settlement.

Fyli suffered some damage from the 2007 and the 2023 forest fires.

== Geography ==
Fyli is situated in the southern foothills of the mountains of Parnitha, and northeast of the plain of Eleusis. It is 4 km northeast of Ano Liosia, 8 km northeast of Aspropyrgos and 14 km northwest of Athens city centre. The A6 motorway passes south of the town.

== Population ==
Year	Municipal unit	Municipality
1981	2,135	-
1991	2,925	-
2001	2,947	-
2011	2,946	45,965
2021	3,209	48,157

== See also ==
- List of municipalities of Attica
