= List of basketball clubs in Greece =

List of professional basketball clubs in Greece:

- AEK
- AEL 1964 Larissa
- AENK
- AGEH Gymnastikos
- AEP Olympias Patras
- Aigaleo Athens
- Amyntas Dafnis
- Apollon Patras
- Aries Trikala
- Aris Thessaloniki
- Dafni
- Ethnikos Piraeus
- Filathlitikos
- ICBS
- Ikaros
- Ilysiakos Athens
- Ionikos Lamias
- Ionikos Neas Filadelfeias
- Ionikos Nikaias
- Irakleio
- Iraklis Thessaloniki
- KAOD
- Kavala
- Kolossos Rhodes
- Koroivos Amaliadas
- Lavrio
- Makedonikos Kozani
- Maroussi Athens
- MENT
- Milon
- Near East
- Olympia Larissa
- Olympiacos Piraeus
- Pagrati Athens
- Paleo Faliro Piraeus
- Panathinaikos Athens
- Panelefsiniakos
- Panellinios
- Panionios Nea Smyrni
- PAOK Thessaloniki
- Papagou Athens
- Peristeri Athens
- Promitheas Patras
- Rethymno Cretan Kings
- Sporting Athens
- Trikala 2000
- XAN Thessaloniki
- Xanthi
