= Acharnes =

Acharnes (Menidi) Αχαρνές (Μενίδι)
- Municipality
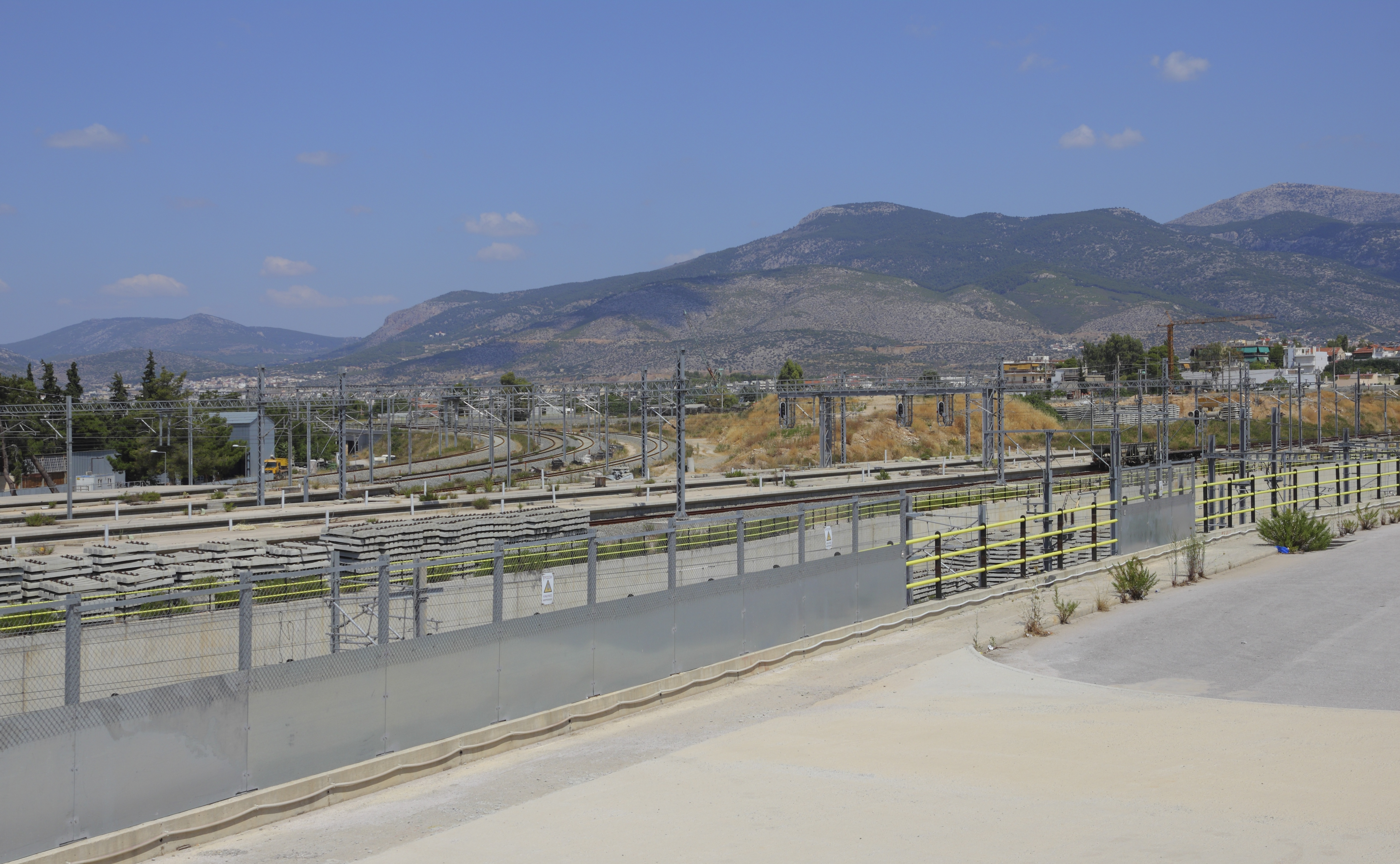
- View to Mount Parnitha in Acharnes

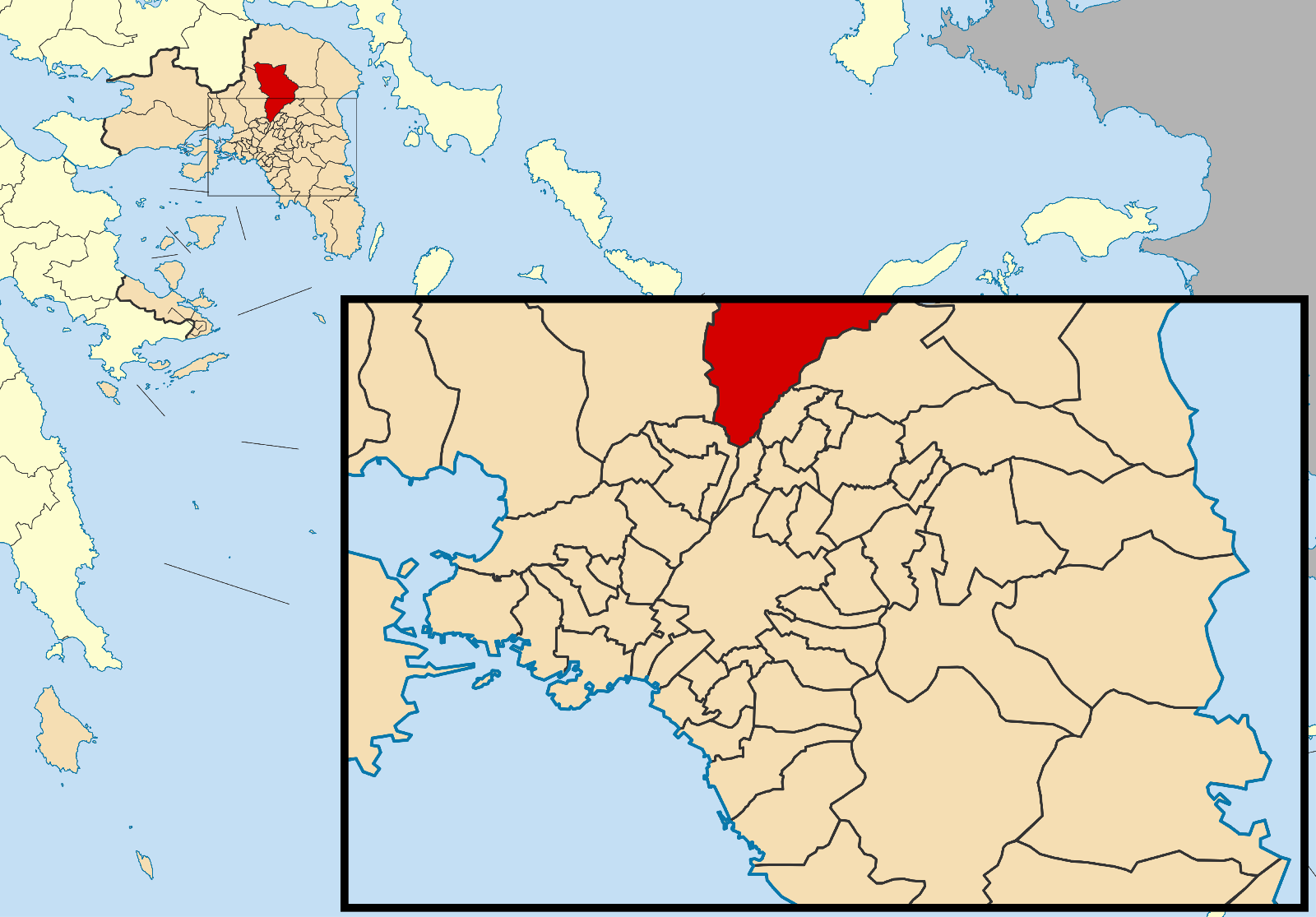

- Location within Greece
- Coordinates: 38°5′N 23°44′E
- Country: Greece
- Administrative region: Attica
- Regional unit: East Attica

Government
  - Mayor: Spyros Vrettos (since 2019)

Area
  - Municipality: 149.96 km^{2} (57.90 sq mi)
  - Municipal unit: 146.41 km^{2} (56.53 sq mi)
- Elevation: 186 m (610 ft)

Population (2021)
  - Municipality: 108,169
  - Density: 721.32/km^{2} (1,868.2/sq mi)
  - Municipal unit: 100,857
  - Municipal unit density: 688.87/km^{2} (1,784.2/sq mi)
- Time zone: UTC+2 (EET)
  - Summer (DST): UTC+3 (EEST)
- Postal code: 136 xx
- Area code: 210
- Vehicle registration: Z
- Website: www.acharnes.gr

Acharnes, (Greek: Αχαρνές, before 1915: Μενίδι, Menidi) is a municipality in the East Attica regional unit in Greece. With 108,169 inhabitants (2021 census), it is the ninth most populous municipality in Greece. It lies just north of the Athens urban area.

== Geography ==
The northern part of the municipality is covered by the forested Parnitha mountain. The southern part is in the plain of Athens, and is densely populated. The built-up area of Acharnes in this southern part of the municipality is continuous with that of the adjacent suburbs to the west, east and south. The centre of Acharnes is 11 kilometres (7 miles) due north of Athens city centre. The two other settlements in the municipality, Thrakomakedones and Varympompi, are situated further north, in the foothills of Parnitha. Acharnes is crossed by several important roads and railways, including the A6 motorway, the Piraeus–Platy railway and the Athens Airport–Patras railway. The Acharnes Railway Center is the main railway junction of Attica; two other stations in the municipality are Acharnes railway station and Kato Acharnes railway station, both on the Piraeus–Platy railway. Acharnes is home to the Folk Art Museum of Acharnes.

== History ==
Acharnes has historically been an Arvanite settlement. There is also a large minority of Roma.

Acharnes was named after the deme Acharnae (Ancient Greek: Ἁχαρναί), a subdivision of Athens in classical antiquity. The Athenian playwright Aristophanes characterised the inhabitants of Acharnae as peasants in his play The Acharnians. Acharnes suffered significant damage from the 1999 Athens earthquake, being very close to the epicenter.

== Municipality ==
The municipality Acharnes was formed at the 2011 local government reform by the merger of the following 2 former municipalities, that became municipal units:

- Acharnes (incl. Varympompi and Parnis)
- Thrakomakedones

The municipality has an area of 149.956 km^{2}, the municipal unit 146.406 km^{2}.

== Historical population ==
Year	Municipal unit	Municipality
1981	41,068	-
1991	61,352	-
2001	75,341	-
2011	100,743	106,943
2021	100,857	108,169

== Museums ==
The Folk Art Museum of Acharnes is a museum in Acharnes. It was founded in 1977 by the local Greek Mountaineering Society, which also formed the Historical and Folklore Association in 1981, to which it bequeathed the museum in 1982. The archaeological part of the collection was then separated from the historical and folklore material and was given to the Hellenic Ministry of Culture. Former Minister Melina Mercouri founded for it the Archaeological Museum of Acharnes in a neoclassical building in the central square of Acharnes, which had formerly housed the local Town Hall. The same building houses the Historical and Folklore Society and its Folk Art Museum to the present time.

== Sporting teams ==
- Acharnaikos F.C. - third division

== See also ==
- List of municipalities of Attica
