= Agioi Anargyroi railway station =

Railway station in West Athens, Greece

Άγιοι Ανάργυροι Agioi Anargyroi
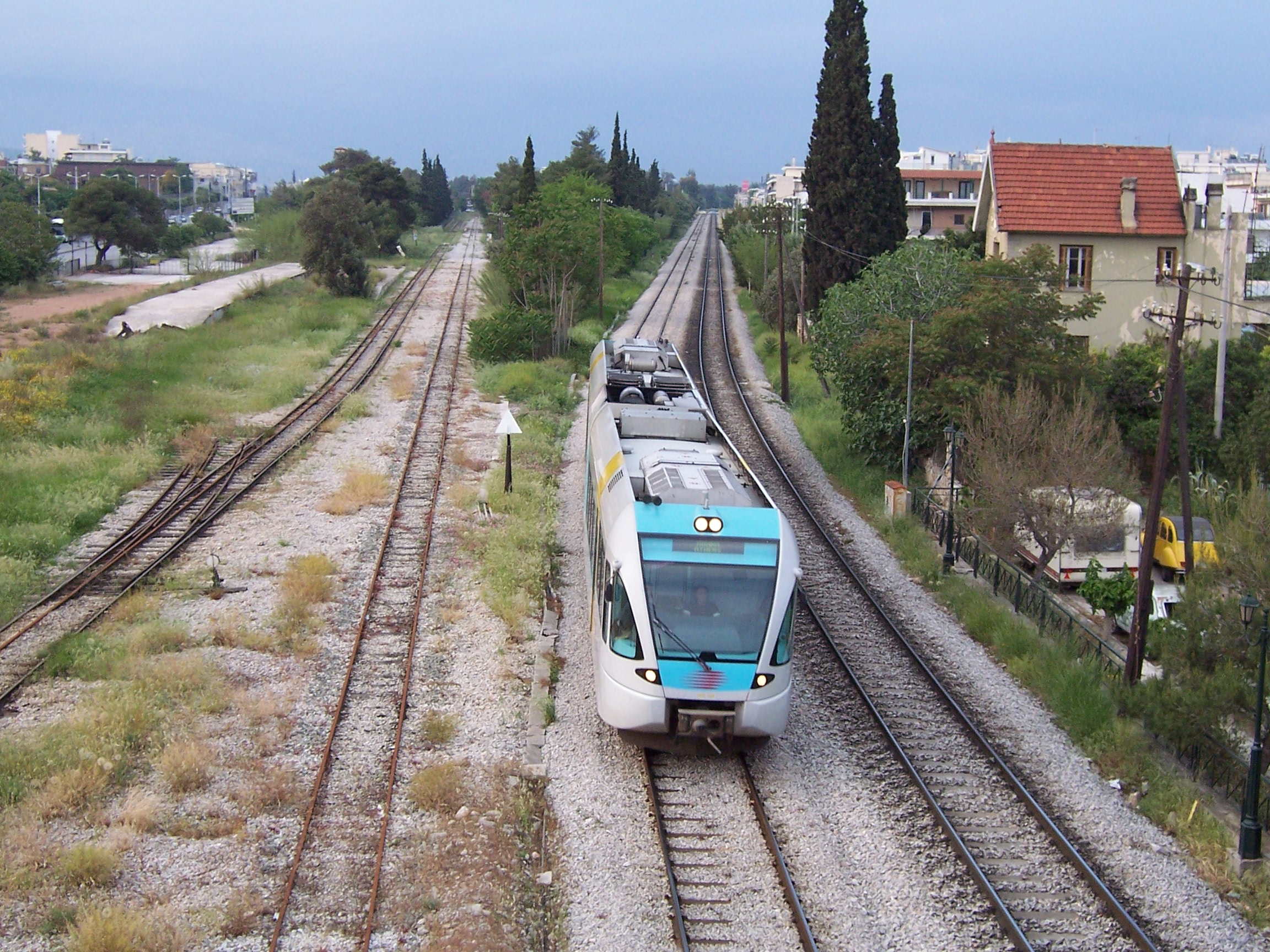
- A Suburban Railway DMU (Stadler Railbus) in Agioi Anargyroi (station not yet built) from the Airport to Athens, May 2006.

General information
- Location: Agioi Anargyroi 135 61 Agioi Anargyroi-Kamatero; West Athens; Greece
- Coordinates: 38°01′18.5″N 23°43′06.25″E
- Owner: GAIAOSE
- Operator: Hellenic Train
- Line: Piraeus–Platy railway
- Platforms: 4
- Tracks: 4

Construction
- Structure type: at-grade
- Platform levels: 2
- Parking: Yes
- Accessible: Yes

Key dates
- 8 March 1904: Line opened
- 8 August 2010: Station opened
- 30 July 2017: Line electrified

Services
Preceding station	Suburban Rail	Following station
Athens towards Piraeus	Line A1	Pyrgos Vasilissis towards Athens Airport
Athens towards Piraeus	Line A4	Pyrgos Vasilissis towards Kiato
Athens Terminus	Line A3	Acharnes Railway Center towards Chalcis
Former services
Preceding station	Former railways	Following station
Athens Peloponnese towards Piraeus	Piraeus–Patras Railway (SPAP)	Kamatero towards Patras
Location

Agioi Anargyroi railway station (Greek: Σιδηροδρομικός σταθμός Αγίων Αναργύρων, romanized: Sidirodromikós Stathmós Agíon Anargýron) is a station on the Piraeus–Platy railway line in Agioi Anargyroi, a suburb in the municipality of Agioi Anargyroi-Kamatero, in the regional unit of West Athens, Attica, Greece. It is located at the junction of Dimokratias and Psaron streets, opposite Kokkinopoulou Square, and has two island platforms. It was opened on 8 August 2010, replacing an older metre-gauge station of the same name. It is located close to the Hellenic Army's Agioi Anargyroi military base.

== History ==
The new station should not be confused with the old station of the former Piraeus–Patras railway, located north of the current station on Iroon Polytechniou street between Aretis and Distomou streets, which closed in July 2007. Maintenance works were carried out in 2019, in part to repair water damage from winter flooding the previous year.

The station is owned by GAIAOSE, which since 3 October 2001 owns most railway stations in Greece: the company was also in charge of rolling stock from December 2014 until October 2025, when Greek Railways (the owner of the Piraeus–Platy railway) took over that responsibility.

== Facilities ==
The station building is above the platforms, with access to the platform level via stairs or lifts. The station buildings are also equipped with toilets and a staffed ticket office. At platform level, there are sheltered seating and Dot-matrix display departure and arrival screens or timetable poster boards on both platforms on all four platforms. Access to platforms 1-4 is via the main concourse. Platforms 3 & 4 are much longer than Platforms 1 & 2. To the left of the station buildings, there is a passenger car park, with free parking. Outside the station, there is a bus stop where the local services call. Road access to the station is provided by a small square that opens out onto Leof. Dimokratias.

== Services ==
Since 22 November 2025, the following services call at this station:

- Athens Suburban Railway Line A1 between Piraeus and Athens Airport, with up to one train per hour;
- Athens Suburban Railway Line A3 between Athens and Chalcis, with up to one train every two hours, plus one extra train during the weekday afternoon peak;
- Athens Suburban Railway Line A4 between Piraeus and Kiato, with up to one train per hour.

Bus's stop outside the station, where the local 420, 711, 719, 735, A10, A11, B10, B11, B12 & Γ12 call.

== Station layout ==
L Ground/Concourse	Customer service	Tickets/Exits
Level; L1
Level; L1	Platform 1	← to Airport / to Kiato (Pyrgos Vasilissis) or Chalcis (SKA)
Level; L1	Island platform, doors will open on the right
Level; L1	Platform 2	to Piraeus (Athens) / to Athens (terminus) →
Level; L1	Platform 3	← to Airport / to Kiato (Pyrgos Vasilissis) or Chalcis (SKA)
Level; L1	Island platform, doors will open on the right
Level; L1	Platform 4	to Piraeus (Athens) / to Athens (terminus) →

== Future ==
In 2021, plans were announced to restore the old metre-gauge line of the Piraeus–Patras railway between Agioi Anargyroi and Athens railway station.

== See also ==
- Railway stations in Greece
- Hellenic Railways Organization
- Hellenic Train
- Proastiakos
