= Magoula Karditsa railway station =

Railway station in Karditsa, Thessaly, Greece

Μαγούλα Καρδίτσας Magoula Karditsa

General information
- Location: Pamisos 431 00; Karditsa; Greece
- Coordinates: 39°27′07″N 21°47′18″E
- Owner: GAIAOSE
- Operator: Hellenic Train
- Line: Palaiofarsalos–Kalambaka railway
- Platforms: 1
- Tracks: 1
- Train operators: Hellenic Train

Construction
- Structure type: at-grade
- Platform levels: 1
- Parking: No
- Cycle facilities: No

Other information
- Status: Unstaffed
- Website: http://www.ose.gr/en/

History
- Opened: 2001
- Electrified: No

Services
Preceding station	Hellenic Train	Following station
Fanari towards Athens	C2 Athens-Kalambaka (rail replacement bus)	Trikala towards Kalambaka
Fanari towards Palaiofarsalos	G3 Palaiofarsalos-Kalambaka	Trikala towards Kalambaka
Former services
Preceding station	Thessaly Railways	Following station
Fanario Horio towards Volos	Volos–Kalambaka	Kalyvia towards Kalambaka
Location
- Location within Greece

Magoula Karditsa railway station (Greek: Σιδηροδρομικός σταθμός Μαγούλας Καρδίτσας, romanized: Sidirodromikós stathmós Magoula Karditsa) is a small railway station in the Karditsa regional unit, Thessaly. Located east of a farming community of the same name, it opened in 2001 when the line was upgraded. It is a small, unstaffed Holt.

Currently no trains serve the station, with rail replacement bus service operation between the Kalambaka and Paleofarsalos, where onward services can be found.

== History ==
The station was opened in 2001 on the old Thessaly Railways. The line was authorized by the Greek government under the law AMH’/22.6.1882. soon after the liberation of Central Greece from the Ottomans. It was, however not until 2001 this station was built

In 2001 the section between Kalampaka and Palaiofarsalos was converted from Narrow-gauge (1000 mm) to standard gauge (1435 mm) and physically connected at Palaiofarsalos with the mainline from Athens to Thessaloniki. Since to upgrade. However, travel times improved, and the unification of rail gauge allowed direct services, even InterCity services, to link Volos and Kalambaka with Athens and Thessaloniki.

In 2001 the infrastructure element of OSE was created, known as GAIAOSE; it would henceforth be responsible for the maintenance of stations, bridges and other elements of the network, as well as the leasing and the sale of railway assists. In 2005, TrainOSE was created as a brand within OSE to concentrate on rail services and passenger interface. In 2009, with the Greek debt crisis unfolding OSE's Management was forced to reduce services across the network. Timetables were cut back, and routes closed as the government-run entity attempted to reduce overheads. In 2015 a 15-year-old child was airlifted to hospital after being electrocuted at the station. In 2017 OSE's passenger transport sector was privatised as TrainOSE, currently, a wholly owned subsidiary of Ferrovie dello Stato Italiane infrastructure, including stations, remained under the control of OSE. In July 2022, the station began being served by Hellenic Train, the rebranded TranOSE.

On the 5 September 2023, Storm Daniel triggered largescale flooding in Thessaly. The rail infrastructure was badly affected in the region, cutting on both Regional and Intercity routes as significant parts of the infrastructure were washed away. OSE engineers were on the ground in the worst affected areas Domokos, Doxaras, and Paleofarsalos to assess the extent of the damage, and prepare detailed reports, and seek financial assistance from the European Union. 50 km (31 mi) of tracks was completely destroyed

Repairing the extensive damage, was estimated at between 35 and 45 million euros. OSE managing director, Panagiotis Terezakis, spoke of reconstruction works reaching 50 million euros, confirming at the same time that there will be no rail traffic in the effected sections of the network for at least a month. The devastation goes beyond the tracks and signalling, affecting costly equipment such as the European Train Control System (ETCS), which enhances rail safety. The line from Palaiofarsalos–Kalambaka was damaged, with extensive work needed to repair the line and resume services As a result services between Palaiofarsalos and Kalambaka remain suspended across Thessaly’s coast until the track is repaired, with a rail-replacement bus in operation.

== Facilities ==
The Station is a basic halt, with few facilities. There are waiting rooms and ramps for wheelchairs. The station is (as of 2020) unstaffed, with no ticket-purchasing facilities or parking.

== Services ==
In August 2009, TrainOSE S.A. proceeded to a drastic cutback of passenger services on Thessaly lines. As of Spring 2020, There are ten (five in each direction) Regional express services on Palaiofarsalos-Kalambaka Line. In addition, there is one Regional express train to Athens from Kalambaka and back (884/885).

Until 2023 the station was served by direct lines to the rest of Greece via Palaiofarsalos, served by intercity trains to Athens, Palaiofarsalos Larissa and Thessaloniki. Previously Thessaly Railways operated a narrow gauge service to Volos. However no trains currently (2026) call at this station due to track renewal work.

Note: It also announced in September 2023 the resumption of the rail replacement bus connecting Palaiofarsalos to Kalambaka, due to damage coursed by a mega-storm in September.

== Facilities ==
The station is a modest facility, equipped with a single platform and basic amenities. It features a small, well-preserved 19th-century station building. While there is no staffed ticket office, passengers can purchase tickets from Hellenic Train online or through other channels. Access to the platform is straightforward, and the station is generally accessible for passengers with mobility impairments [7]. There is also limited parking available outside the station building.

== Future Developments ==
The Hellenic Ministry of Infrastructure and Transport has outlined plans for further upgrades to the Thessaly rail network, including electrification and the installation of modern signaling systems. These improvements aim to enhance service reliability, increase train speeds, and potentially introduce more frequent services, benefiting stations like Magoula Karditsa in the long term. The ongoing reconstruction efforts following Storm Daniel are also part of a broader strategy to modernize and improve the resilience of the Greek railway infrastructure.
