= Acharnes railway station =

Αχαρνές Acharnes

General information
- Location: 136 72, Acharnes; East Attica; Greece
- Coordinates: 38°04′49″N 23°44′38″E
- Owner: GAIAOSE
- Operator: Hellenic Train
- Line: Piraeus–Platy railway
- Platforms: 2
- Tracks: 3

Construction
- Structure type: at-grade
- Platform levels: 1
- Parking: Yes
- Cycle facilities: No
- Accessible: Yes

Other information
- Status: Staffed (Peak times only)
- Website: http://www.ose.gr/en/

History
- Former names: Menidi

Key dates
- 8 March 1904: Opened
- 30 July 2017: Electrified

Services
Preceding station	Suburban Rail	Following station
Acharnes Railway Center towards Athens	Line A3	Dekeleia towards Chalcis
Location

Acharnes railway station (Greek: Σιδηροδρομικός σταθμός Αχαρνών, romanized: Sidirodromikós stathmós Acharnón) is a station on the Piraeus–Platy railway line in the northern part of the Athens urban area, in the municipality of Acharnes, Greece. It was inaugurated on 8 March 1904. It is owned by GAIAOSE, however, services are provided by Hellenic Train through the Athens Suburban Railway from Athens to Chalcis. Acharnes station was originally known as Menidi, the vernacular name of Acharnes.

== History ==
The Station opened on 8 March 1904 on what was a branch line of the Piraeus, Demerli & Frontiers Railway. Originally the line was steam-powered, evident by the (now) disused water pump adjacent to the station. In 1920 the station and most of the standard gauge railways in Greece came under the control of the Hellenic State Railways (SEK). During the Axis occupation of Greece (1941–44), Athens was controlled by the German military, and the line used for the transport of troops and weapons. During the occupation (and especially during German withdrawal in 1944), the network was severely damaged by both the German army and Greek resistance groups. The track and rolling stock replacement took time following the civil war, with normal service levels resumed around 1948. In 1970 OSE became the legal successor to the SEK, taking over responsibilities for most of Greece's rail infrastructure. On 1 January 1971, the station and most of the Greek rail infrastructure were transferred to the Hellenic Railways Organisation S.A., a state-owned corporation, known as OSE. The line was converted to diesel sometime before 1990. Freight traffic declined sharply when the state-imposed monopoly of OSE for the transport of agricultural products and fertilisers ended in the early 1990s. Many small stations of the network with little passenger traffic were closed down.

In 2001, the infrastructure element of OSE was created, known as GAIAOSE; it would henceforth be responsible for the maintenance of stations, bridges and other elements of the network, as well as the leasing and the sale of railway assists. In 2003, OSE launched "Proastiakos SA", as a subsidiary to serve the operation of the suburban network in the urban complex of Athens during the 2004 Olympic Games. In 2005, TrainOSE was created as a brand within OSE to concentrate on rail services and passenger interface. In 2008, all Athens Suburban Railway services were transferred from OSE to TrainOSE.

In 2009, with the Greek debt crisis unfolding OSE's Management was forced to reduce services across the network. Timetables were cutback and routes closed, as the government-run entity attempted to reduce overheads. In 2017 OSE's passenger transport sector was privatised as TrainOSE, currently a wholly owned subsidiary of Ferrovie dello Stato Italiane infrastructure, including stations, remained under the control of OSE. That same year on 30 July the Athens Suburban Railway began serving the station. In 2018, the police broke up a criminal enterprise that targeted waiting passengers and rail staff at the station.

The station is owned by GAIAOSE, which since 3 October 2001 owns most railway stations in Greece: the company was also in charge of rolling stock from December 2014 until October 2025, when Greek Railways (the owner of the Piraeus–Platy railway) took over that responsibility.

== Facilities ==
The ground-level station is accessed via stairs or a ramp. It has two side platforms, with the main station buildings located on the eastbound platform, with access to the platforms via stairs or lifts. There are station buildings on the westbound. However, these are inaccessible and rundown. The Station is housed in the original stone-built station buildings and is equipped with a booking office and waiting area. At platform level, both platforms have sheltered seating and Dot-matrix display departure and arrival screens (as of November 2025, non-operational) and timetable poster boards. There is currently a small car park on-site. Outside the station, there is a bus stop where the local buses call.

== Services ==
=== Suburban rail services ===
Since 22 November 2025, the following weekday services call at this station:

- Athens Suburban Railway Line A3 between Athens and Chalcis, with up to one train every two hours, plus one extra train during the weekday afternoon peak.

=== Bus ===
The station is also served by local and regional buses:

Transport for Athens operates Lines 537, 721, 734, 755

== Station layout ==
L Ground/Concourse	Customer service	Tickets/Exits
Level; L1	Side platform, doors will open on the right
Level; L1	Platform 1	← to Athens (SKA)
Level; L1	Platform 2	to Chalcis (Dekeleia) →
Level; L1	Side platform, doors will open on the right

== See also ==
- Railway stations in Greece
- Hellenic Railways Organization
- Hellenic Train
- Proastiakos
- P.A.Th.E./P.
