= Trikala railway station =

Railway station in Trikala, Thessaly, Greece

Τρίκαλα Trikala
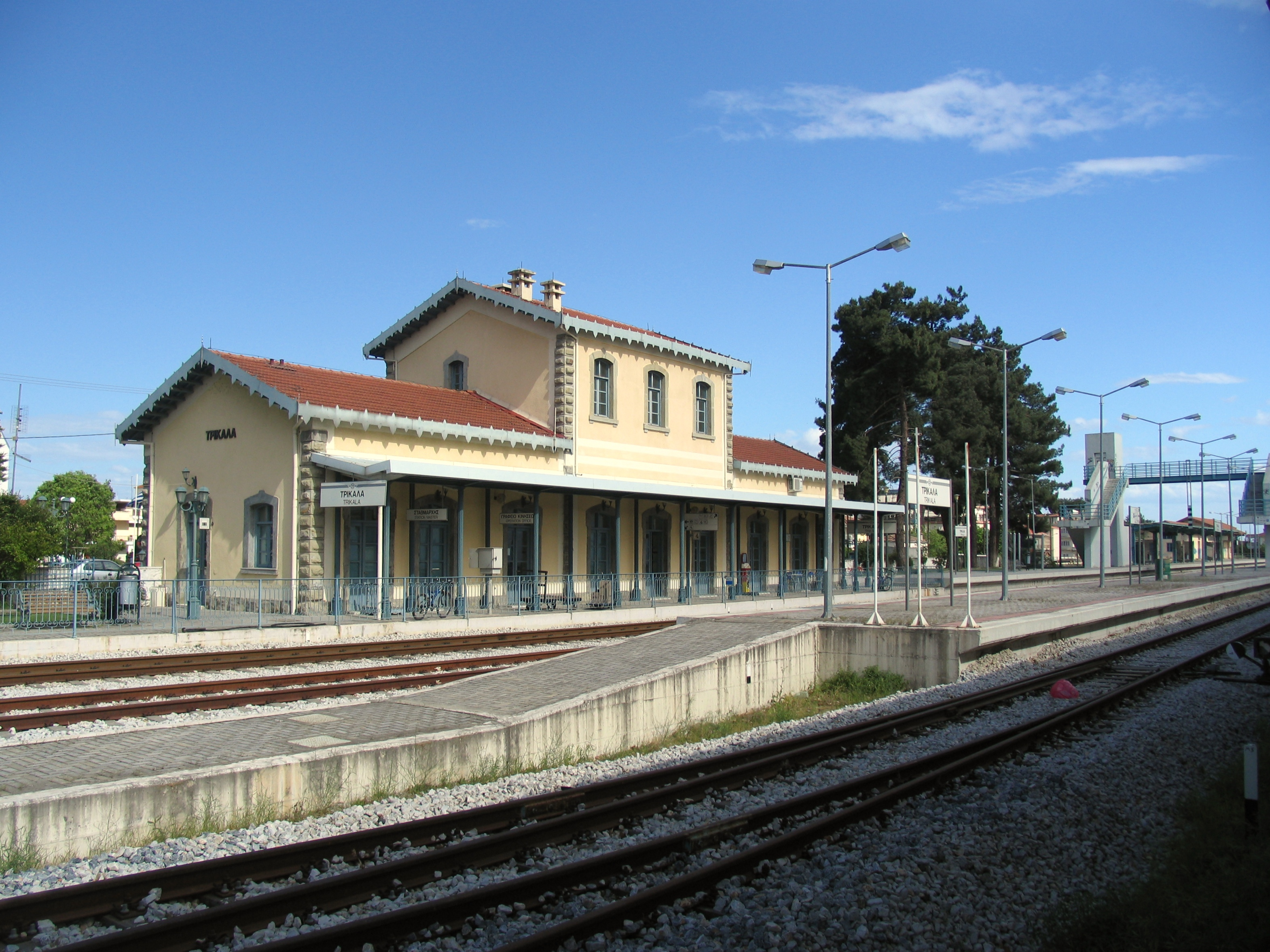
- The old station building and the current platforms, March 2009

General information
- Location: Trikala 421 00; Trikala; Greece
- Coordinates: 39°32′43″N 21°45′50″E
- Owner: GAIAOSE
- Line: Palaiofarsalos–Kalambaka railway
- Platforms: 3
- Tracks: 3
- Train operators: Hellenic Train
- Connections: Bus

Construction
- Structure type: at-grade
- Platform levels: 1

Other information
- Status: Staffed

History
- Opened: 16 June 1886; 140 years ago
- Electrified: No

Services
Preceding station	Hellenic Train	Following station
Magoula Karditsa towards Athens	C2 Athens-Kalambaka (rail replacement bus)	Kalambaka Terminus
Magoula Karditsa towards Palaiofarsalos	G3 Palaiofarsalos-Kalambaka	Kalambaka Terminus

Former service
Preceding station	Thessaly Railways	Following station
Drossero towards Volos	Volos–Kalambaka	Kefalovrysso towards Kalambaka
Location
- Location within Greece

Trikala railway station (Greek: Σιδηροδρομικός σταθμός Τρικάλων) is a railway station in Trikala, Thessaly, Greece. The station is served by regional trains between Palaiofarsalos and Kalambaka. The station building is listed as a monument in Greece identified by the ID GR-E44-0038.

Currently, no trains serve the station, with rail replacement bus service operation between the Kalambaka and Paleofarsalos, where onward services can be found.

== History ==
The station opened on 16 June 1886 as an intermittent station of Thessaly Railways. The original station building (and the line) was designed by the Italian Evaristo de Chirico, (father of Giorgio de Chirico). The line was authorised by the Greek government under the law AMH’/22.6.1882. soon after the liberation of Central Greece from the Ottomans. Trikala was one of the mainline stations (as shown by the impressive original station building) along with Farsala and Kalambaka.

After the First World War, the Greek state planned the ambitious construction of several new rail lines and links, including a standard gauge line from Kalambaka onto Kozani and then Veroia creating a conversion of the route from Volos to Kalambaka on standard gauge. In 1927, the relevant decisions were made; starting in 1928, work was carried out on the construction of the new line from Kalambaka. But a year later, it was clear that the project would exceed the estimated costs many times over. In 1932, the construction work was stopped and remains unfinished. In 1955 Thessaly Railways was absorbed into Hellenic State Railways (SEK).

Freight traffic declined sharply when the state-imposed monopoly of OSE for the transport of agricultural products and fertilisers ended in the early 1990s. Many small stations of the network with little passenger traffic were closed down, especially on the mainline section and between Karditsa and Kalampaka. In 2001 the section between Kalampaka and Palaiofarsalos was converted from narrow gauge (1000 mm) to standard gauge (1435 mm) and physically connected at Palaiofarsalos with the mainline from Athens to Thessaloniki. Since the upgrade, travel times have improved and the unification of rail gauge allowed direct services, even InterCity services, to link Volos and Kalambaka with Athens and Thessaloniki.

In 2001 the infrastructure element of OSE was created, known as GAIAOSE; it would henceforth be responsible for the maintenance of stations, bridges and other elements of the network, as well as the leasing and the sale of railway assists. In 2005, TrainOSE was created as a brand within OSE to concentrate on rail services and passenger interface. In 2009, with the Greek debt crisis unfolding OSE's Management was forced to reduce services across the network. Timetables were cut back, and routes closed as the government-run entity attempted to reduce overheads. In 2015 a 15-year-old child was airlifted to a hospital after being electrocuted at the station. In 2017 OSE's passenger transport sector was privatised as TrainOSE, currently, a wholly owned subsidiary of Ferrovie dello Stato Italiane infrastructure, including stations, remained under the control of OSE. In July 2022, the station began being served by Hellenic Train, the rebranded TranOSE

On the 5 September 2023, Storm Daniel triggered largescale flooding in Thessaly. The rail infrastructure was badly affected in the region, cutting on both Regional and Intercity routes as significant parts of the infrastructure were washed away. OSE engineers were on the ground in the worst affected areas Domokos, Doxaras, and Paleofarsalos to assess the extent of the damage, and prepare detailed reports, and seek financial assistance from the European Union. 50 km (31 mi) of tracks was completely destroyed

Repairing the extensive damage, was estimated at between 35 and 45 million euros. OSE managing director, Panagiotis Terezakis, spoke of reconstruction works reaching 50 million euros, confirming at the same time that there will be no rail traffic in the effected sections of the network for at least a month. The devastation goes beyond the tracks and signalling, affecting costly equipment such as the European Train Control System (ETCS), which enhances rail safety. The line from Palaiofarsalos–Kalambaka was damaged, with extensive work needed to repair the line and resume services As a result services between Palaiofarsalos and Kalambaka remain suspended across Thessaly’s coast until the track is repaired, with a rail-replacement bus in operation.

== Facilities ==
The station has a footbridge from platform 1 to platform 2 via stairs or lifts.

== Services ==
In August 2009, TrainOSE S.A. proceeded to a drastic cutback of passenger services on Thessaly lines. As of Spring 2020, There are ten (five in each direction) Regional express services on Palaiofarsalos-Kalambaka Line. In addition, there is one Regional express train to Athens from Kalambaka and back (884/885).

Until 2023 the station was served by direct lines to the rest of Greece via Palaiofarsalos, served by intercity trains to Athens, Palaiofarsalos Larissa and Thessaloniki. Previously Thessaly Railways operated a narrow gauge service to Volos. However no trains currently (2026) call at this station due to track renewal work.

Note: It also announced in September 2023 the resumption of the rail replacement bus connecting Palaiofarsalos to Kalambaka, due to damage coursed by a mega-storm in September.

== Station Layout ==
L Ground/Concourse	Customer service	Tickets/Exits
Level; L1	Side platform, doors will open on the right
Level; L1	Platform 1	← towards Larissa (Magoula Karditsa)
Level; L1	Platform 2	towards Kalambaka (terminus) →
Level; L1	Island platform, doors will open on the right

== Gallery ==
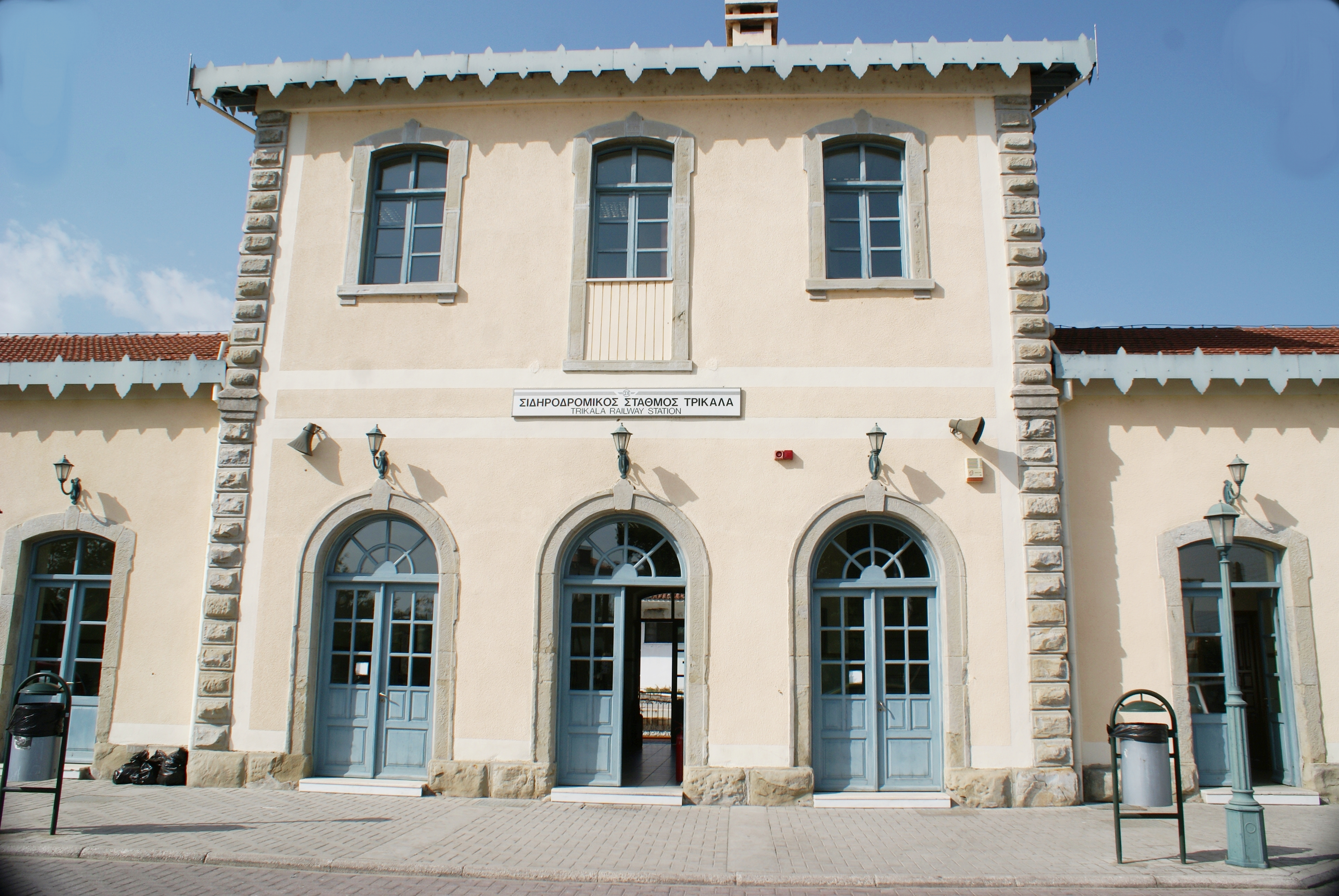
Station building, September 2018

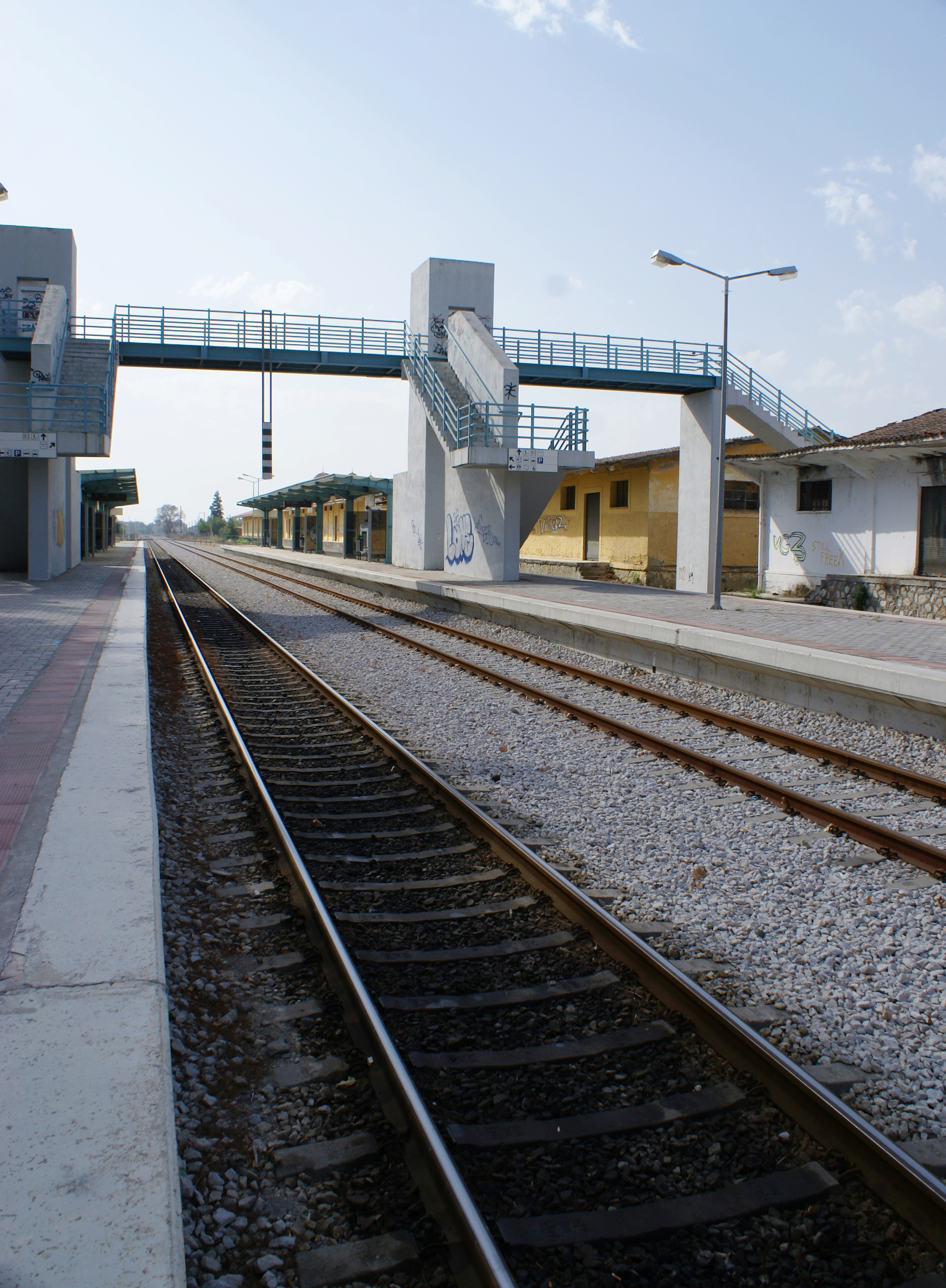
Station buildings and platforms, September 2018

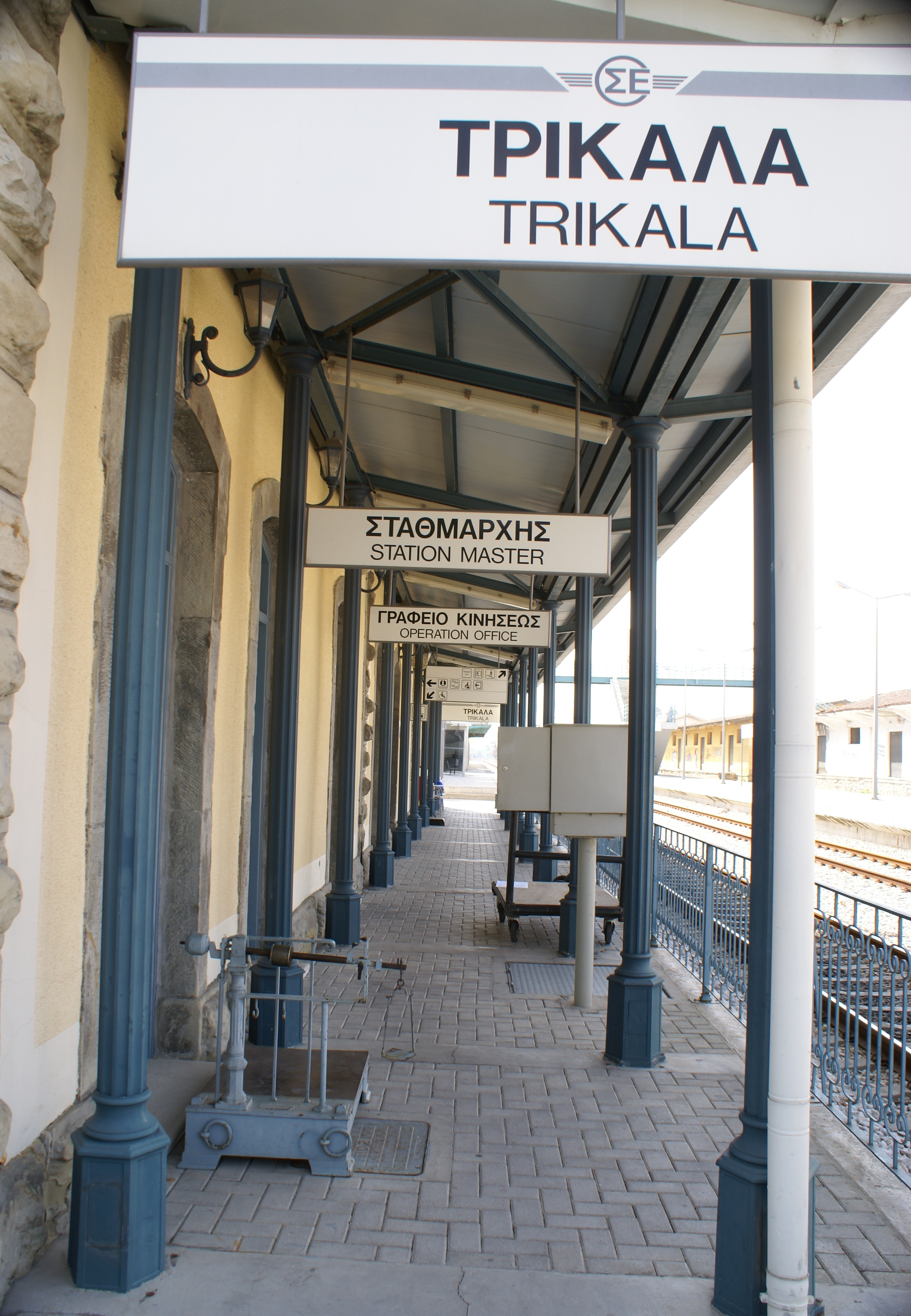
The station sign, still sporting the old OSE logo, September 2018
