= SEK class Mu-alpha =

Class of steam locomotives

SEK class Μα
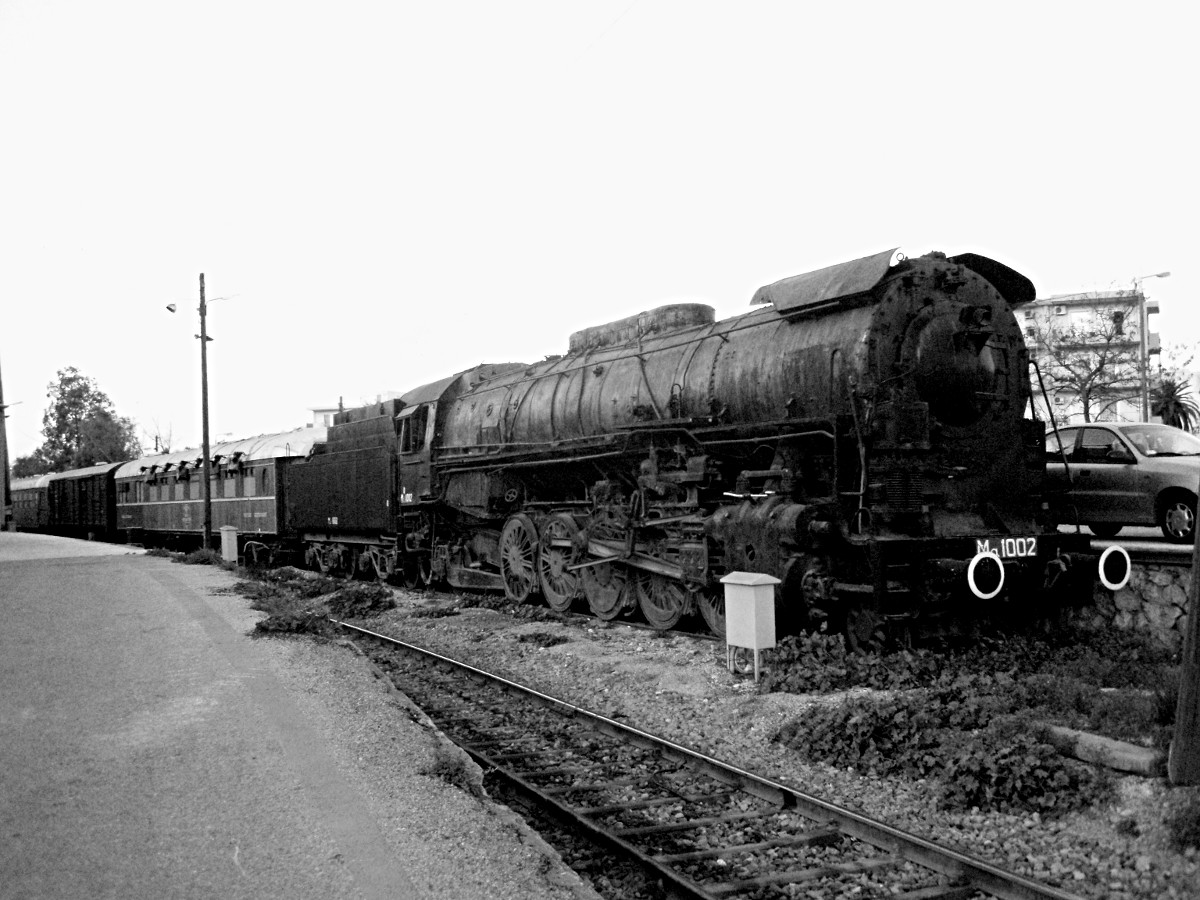
- SEK class Μα steam locomotive Μα-1002 on display at Rouf Station.
Type and origin
- Power type: Steam
- Designer: Breda
- Builder: Breda (10), Ansaldo
- Build date: 1953–1954
- Total produced: 20
- Rebuilder: Henschel & Son
- Rebuild date: 1957–1958
- Number rebuilt: 20
Specifications
- Configuration
  - Whyte: 2-10-2
  - UIC: 1′E1′ h2
- Gauge: 1,435 mm (4 ft 8 1/2 in)
- Leading dia.: 850 mm (33.5 in)
- Driver dia.: 1,600 mm (63.0 in)
- Trailing dia.: 1,050 mm (41.3 in)
- Length: 24.93 m (81 ft 9 in)
- Height: 4.51 m (14 ft 10 in)
- Axle load: 20 tons
- Adhesive weight: 100 tons
- Loco weight: 136 tons
- Tender weight: 66 tons
- Tender type: 2′2′
- Fuel type: Originally: coal, later: fuel oil
- Fuel capacity: 12 tons
- Water cap.: 25,000 L (5,500 imp gal; 6,600 US gal)
- Firebox
  - Grate area: 5.60 m^{2} (60.3 sq ft)
- Boiler pressure: 18 bar (1.8 MPa; 260 psi)
- Heating surface
  - Tubes and flues: 316 m^{2} (3,400 sq ft)
- Superheater
  - Heating area: 125 m^{2} (1,350 sq ft)
- Cylinders: Two
- Cylinder size: 660 mm × 750 mm (26.0 in × 29.5 in)
- Valve gear: Heusinger
- Valve type: Piston valves
Performance figures
- Maximum speed: 110 km/h (68 mph)
- Power output: 2,950 hp (2,200 kW)
- Tractive effort: 312.33 kN (70,215 lbf)
Career
- Operators: Hellenic State Railways
- Number in class: 20
- Numbers: 1001–1020
- Delivered: 1954
- Retired: early 1970s
- Preserved: 2

SEK (Sidirodromoi Ellinikou Kratous, Hellenic State Railways) class Μα (or class Ma; Mu-alpha) was a class of 2-10-2 steam locomotives built by Ansaldo and Breda in 1953. They were numbered Μα 1001-1020.

The Μα locomotives were the last steam locomotives acquired by SEK before conversion to diesel traction. They were designed and built in Italy by Breda (10 units) and Ansaldo (10 units) in 1953–1954, while some parts (including whole tender underframes) were made by Nuove Reggiane. The length of the locomotive with the tender was 24.93 m, the maximum height 4.51 m and service weight 136 tn. The boiler operated at 18 bar and their rated power was 2950 hp. Maximum speed was 90 km/h.

Due to various technical problems, only two years after introduction they were modified by Henschel (1957–1958). The boilers were converted to burn heavy fuel oil.

These locomotives were based at Aghios Ioannis Rentis and Thessaloniki depots and were used mainly for freight trains and for some express passenger trains on Piraeus–Thessaloniki and Thessaloniki–Idomeni mainlines until the early 1970s, when they were withdrawn by the Hellenic Railways Organisation (successor of SEK) due to complete conversion to diesel traction.

Only two examples survived the 1984-1985 steam locomotive scrappings. One of them, 1002 was set on display as part of the theatre "Το Τρένο στο Ρουφ" ("The Train at Rouf"), at Rouf station in Athens.
