= Acharnes Railway Center =

Railway station in Athens, Greece

Σιδηροδρομικό Κέντρο Αχαρνών Acharnes Railway Center
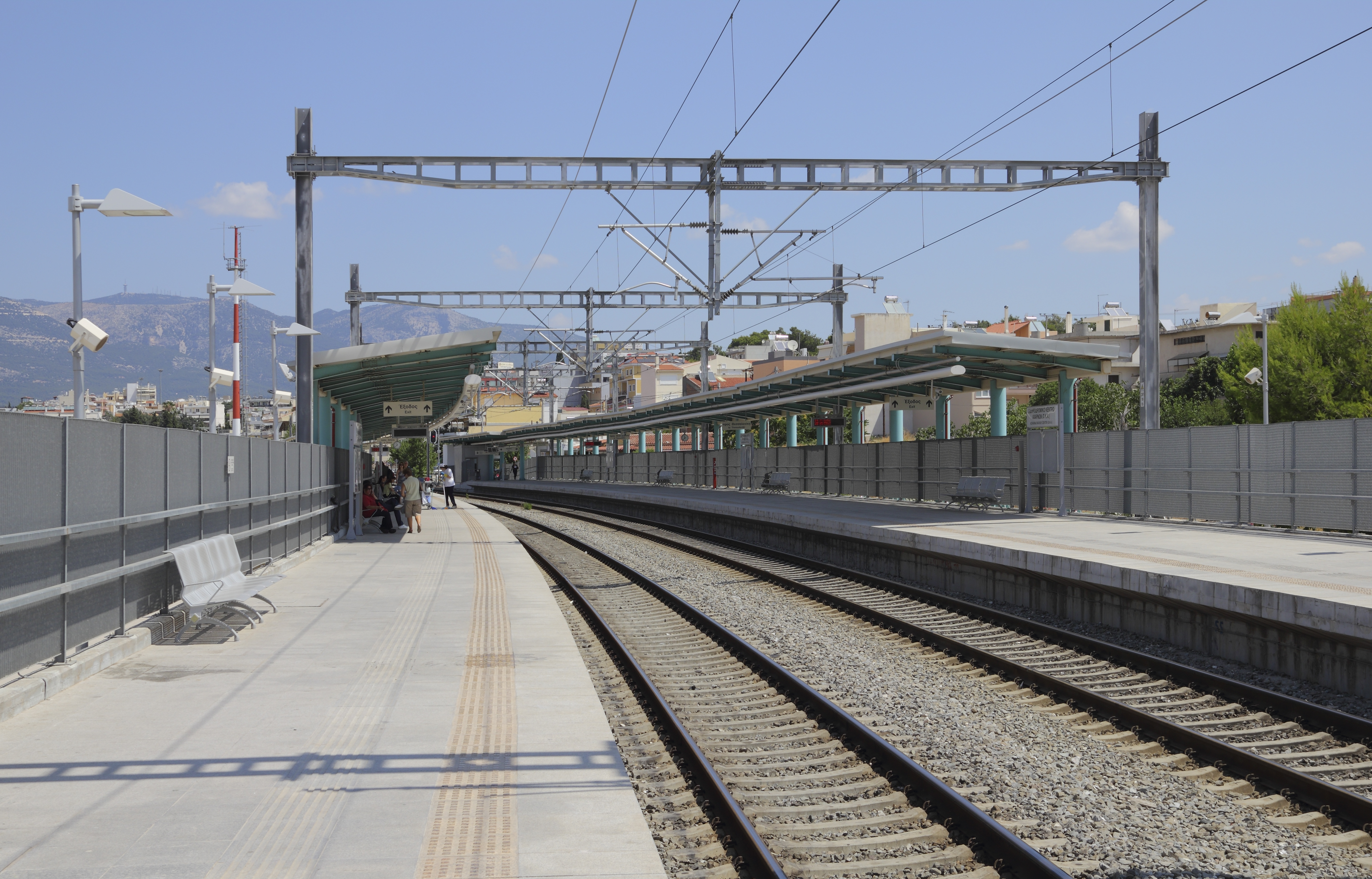
- Acharnes Railway Center, July 2013

General information
- Location: 136 71 Acharnes; Greece
- Coordinates: 38°03′59″N 23°44′12″E
- Owner: GAIAOSE
- Operator: Hellenic Train
- Lines: Airport–Patras railway; Piraeus–Platy railway
- Platforms: 3 Side
- Tracks: 15 (2 for the Athens - Thessaloniki line, 1 for Suburban Railway trains, 1 for freight trains from Piraeus and Thriasion to Northern Greece, 4 tracks from/to Peloponnese and 7 unused tracks.

Construction
- Structure type: at-grade
- Platform levels: 2
- Parking: Yes
- Accessible: Yes

Other information
- Website: http://www.ose.gr/en/

History
- Former names: Menidi Railway Center (SKM)

Key dates
- 8 March 1904: Piraeus–Platy line opened
- 27 September 2005: Airport–Patras line opened
- 14 February 2009: Airport–Patras line electrified
- 5 April 2011: Interchange opened
- 30 July 2017: Piraeus–Platy line electrified

Services
Preceding station	Hellenic Train	Following station
Athens Terminus	C2 Athens-Kalambaka (rail replacement bus)	Oinoi towards Kalambaka
Athens Terminus	G1 Athens-Leianokladi	Oinoi towards Leianokladi
Preceding station	Suburban Rail	Following station
Ano Liosia Terminus	Line A2	Metamorfosi towards Athens Airport
Agioi Anargyroi towards Athens	Line A3	Acharnes towards Chalcis
Line A1 does not stop here
Line A4 does not stop here
Location

The Acharnes Railway Center (Greek: Σιδηροδρομικό Κέντρο Αχαρνών) or SKA is a two-level railway station in the northern parts of the Athens agglomeration, in the suburb of Acharnes, where several important railway lines converge. It is an important passenger interchange station linking The main Piraeus–Platy railway line from Athens Central to Thessaloniki and the Athens Airport–Patras railway. The station opened in April 2011.

== History ==
The station opened on 5 April 2011. Plans for a interchange had been part of future expansion plans to Corinth. Before construction started in 2005, the station was initially to be named Menidi Railway Center (SKM). By 2010, the electrification works of the lines 3 and 4 with 25 kV AC, 50 Hz neared completion, and was opened on the Oinoi–Chalcis line in 2013, in the sections SKA-Oinoi and Treis Gefyres – SKA in 2015, and finally in the section Three Bridges – Piraeus in 2018. In fact, the advent of electrification in SS. Athenson 30 July 2017, led to the modification of the lines of the Suburban Railway to have the central station of the capital as a starting point. The station opened during the Greek debt crisis. With the crisis unfolding, OSE's Management was forced to reduce services across the network. Timetables were cut back, and routes closed as the government-run entity attempted to reduce overheads. Services from Athens Airport & Athens were cut back, with some ticket offices closing, reducing the reliability of services and passenger numbers. In 2017 OSE's passenger transport sector was privatised as TrainOSE, currently, a wholly owned subsidiary of Ferrovie dello Stato Italiane station infrastructure remained under Gaiose, while railway lines is under the control of OSE.

On 1 February 2018, the electrification of the Piraeus-Athens Central station section of the network was completed. The Athens Suburban Railway was extended to Aigio in 2020. In October 2021 it was announced Network improvements between SKA and Oinoi to improve current services and upgrade existing infrastructure would be carried out. In July 2022, the station began being served by Hellenic Train, the rebranded TranOSE.

The station is owned by GAIAOSE, which since 3 October 2001 owns most railway stations in Greece: the company was also in charge of rolling stock from December 2014 until October 2025, when Greek Railways (the owner of the Airport–Patras and Piraeus–Platy railways) took over that responsibility.

== Facilities ==
The station building is adjacent to the southbound platforms, with access to the platform level via stairs or lifts. currently the station has two working side platforms but has been future-proofed for expansion a further eight platforms. Access to the station is via steps or ramp. The Station buildings are also equipped with toilets and a staffed booking office. At platform level, there are sheltered seating in a new air-conditioned indoor passenger shelter and Dot-matrix display departure and arrival screens or timetable poster boards on both platforms. There is a large car park on-site, adjacent to the southbound line. The station has two side platforms, as well as one low-level platform in the median of Attiki Odos toll highway. Currently, only these platforms are used.

== Services ==
Since 22 November 2025, the following services call at this station:

- Athens Suburban Railway Line A2 between Ano Liosia and Athens Airport, with up to two trains per hour on weekdays, and up to one train per hour on weekends and public holidays;
- Athens Suburban Railway Line A3 between Athens and Chalcis, with up to one train every two hours, plus one extra train during the weekday afternoon peak.

Lines A1 and A4 do not call at this station.

The station is also served by local and regional buses:

KTEL Attikis regional buses operates Lines 740 (Olympic Village - SKA - Acharnai - Agia Anna), 755 (Acharnai - St. Kato Patisia)

== Future ==
Usage of the seven remaining platforms

Apart from the two platforms on the Athens to Thessaloniki Line and the Suburban Rail low-level platform, the station has six unused platforms. Those platforms exist in order to accommodate future services, especially after the completion of the P.A.Th.E./P.

- Platforms 1 and 2, which serve tracks 1, 2, 3 and 4, respectively, will open after the completion of the Athens to Patras line. Trains go through these tracks daily; however, they do not call at the station. The Athens to Patras line has already been completed as far as Aigio. The next sections are under construction (the link to the city of Patras is still under planning) and will open in stages from 2020 onwards.
- Platforms 3 and 4 serve tracks 5, 6, 7 and 8. They will be used in case the Acharnes Bypass is completed. If completed, intercity and regional will be redirected through a tunnel, bypassing Acharnes, which will allow them to reach higher speeds, thus reducing travel times. Construction of this bypass seemed likely because the line north of Athens is expected to suffer from capacity issues and become a major bottleneck in the Greek Rail Network. Lack of finance and another proposal with the same goal, the Thriasion - Thiva Line, have put this project on hold.
- Platforms 5 and 6, which serve tracks 9, 10 and 11, are terminating platforms. Usage of these platforms is highly unlikely because extending services further from the station instead of having them terminate there is more favourable because of financial reasons and the fact that they would attract more passengers.

== Criticism ==
Delays in both opening and connection to Corinth Low usage of the station and its unnecessarily large size and the number of platforms have led to the project being criticised as a white elephant.

== See also ==
- Railway stations in Greece
- Hellenic Railways Organization
- Hellenic Train
- Proastiakos
- P.A.Th.E./P.
- Railways of Greece
