= Rouf railway station =

Railway station in Athens, Greece

Ρουφ Rouf
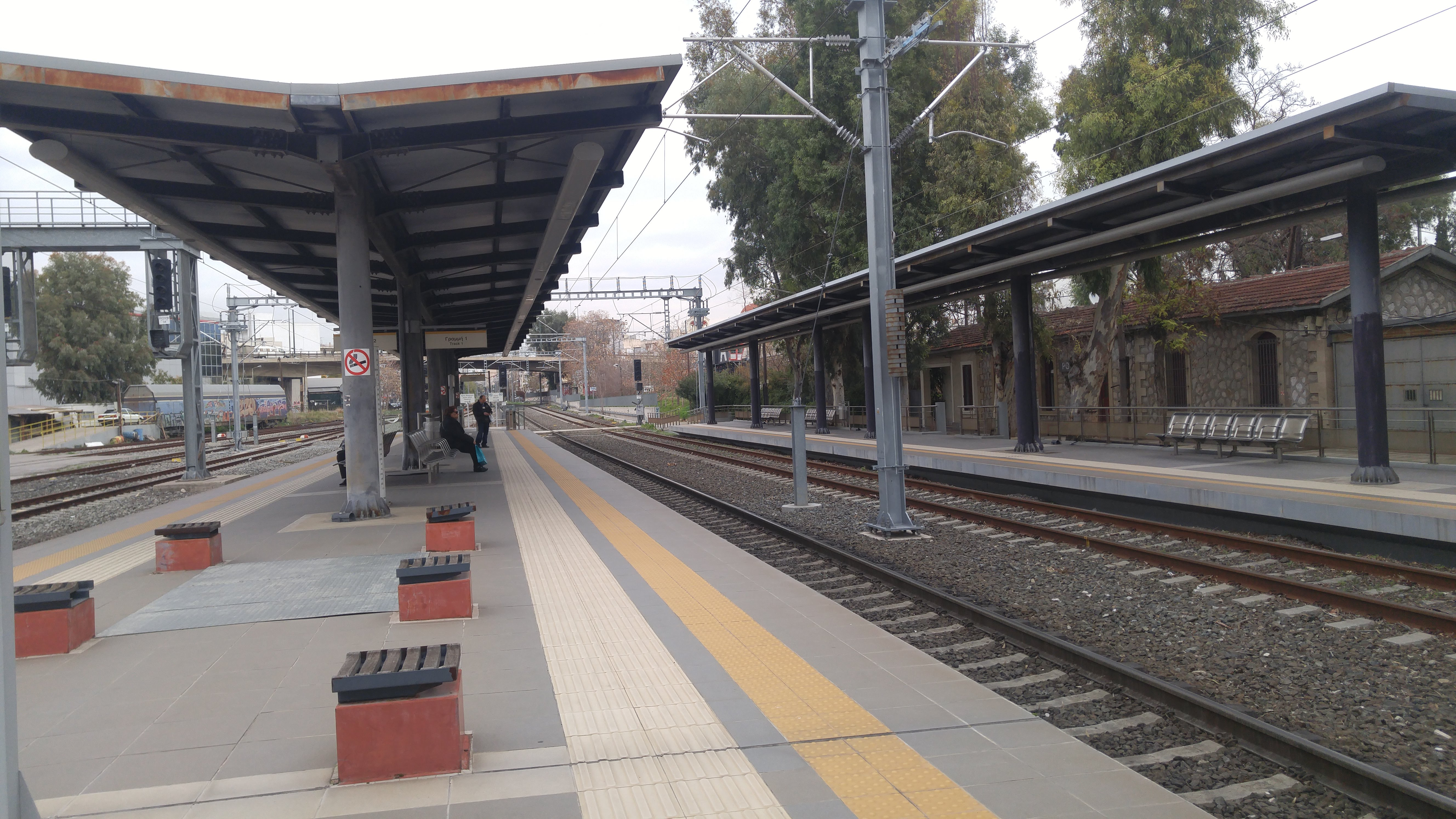
- Rouf railway station, January 2018

General information
- Location: Constantinople & Amfipoleos Ave, 118 54, Athens; Central Athens; Greece
- Coordinates: 37°58′26″N 23°42′13″E
- Owner: GAIAOSE
- Operator: Hellenic Train
- Line: Piraeus–Platy railway
- Platforms: 8 (3 in use)
- Tracks: 8 (3 through lines)

Construction
- Structure type: at-grade
- Depth: 2
- Platform levels: 1
- Parking: Yes
- Cycle facilities: No
- Accessible: Yes

Other information
- Website: http://www.ose.gr/en/

Key dates
- 30 June 1884: Opened
- 4 June 2007: Rebuilt
- 1 February 2018: Electrified

Services
Preceding station	Suburban Rail	Following station
Tavros towards Piraeus	Line A1	Athens towards Athens Airport
Tavros towards Piraeus	Line A4	Athens towards Kiato
Former services
Preceding station	Former railways	Following station
Rentis towards Piraeus	Piraeus–Patras Railway (SPAP)	Athens Peloponnese towards Patras
Location

Rouf railway station (Greek: Σιδηροδρομικός Σταθμός Ρουφ, romanized: Sidirodromikos stathmos Rouf) is a station on the Piraeus–Platy railway line in Rouf, a neighbourhood of Athens, located on the borders of the municipalities of Athens and Tavros. Originally opened on 30 June 1884 it was rebuilt to serve Athens Suburban Railway lines when this section came into operation in June 2007. It owes its name to the area of Rouf, named after a Bavarian businessman who once owned the land in the 19th century.

== History ==
The station opened in its original form on 30 June 1884 on what was the Piraeus, Athens and Peloponnese line (or SPAP) build to connect Piraeus and Athens. In the early 20th century, a large freight depot was built alongside the station and was the main freight base of the Greek railways. In 1920 Hellenic State Railways or SEK was established; however, many railways, such as the SPAP continued to be run as a separate company, becoming an independent company once more two years later.

Due to growing debts, the SPAP came under government control between 1939 and 1940. During the Axis occupation of Greece (1941–44), Athens was controlled by German military forces, and the line was used for the transport of troops and weapons. During the occupation (and especially during the German withdrawal in 1944), the network was severely damaged by both the German army and Greek resistance groups. The track and rolling stock replacement took time following the civil war, with regular services resumeing around 1948. In 1954 SPAP was nationalized once more. In 1962 the SPAP was amalgamated into SEK. In 1970, OSE became the legal successor to the SEK, taking over responsibilities for most of Greece's rail infrastructure. On 1 January 1971, the station and most of the Greek rail infrastructure were transferred to the Hellenic Railways Organisation S.A., a state-owned corporation. Freight traffic declined sharply when the state-imposed monopoly of OSE for the transport of agricultural products and fertilisers ended in the early 1990s. Many small stations of the network with little passenger traffic were closed down.

In 2001 the infrastructure element of OSE was created, known as GAIAOSE; it would henceforth be responsible for the maintenance of stations, bridges and other elements of the network, as well as the leasing and the sale of railway assists. In 2003, OSE launched "Proastiakos SA", as a subsidiary to serve the operation of the suburban network in the urban complex of Athens during the 2004 Olympic Games. In 2005, TrainOSE was created as a brand within OSE to concentrate on rail services and passenger interface.

In 2005, the station was closed for major upgrades to allow the new suburban railway to use the station. On 4 June 2007, its extensive renovation and integration into the new suburban railway network were completed. In 2008, all Athens Suburban Railway services were transferred from OSE to TrainOSE. In 2009, with the Greek debt crisis unfolding OSE's Management was forced to reduce services across the network. Timetables were cutback and routes closed, as the government-run entity attempted to reduce overheads. In 2017 OSE's passenger transport sector was privatised as TrainOSE, (Now Hellenic Train) currently, a wholly owned subsidiary of Ferrovie dello Stato Italiane infrastructure, including stations, remained under the control of OSE.

In July 2022, the station began being served by Hellenic Train, the rebranded TranOSE. The station is owned by GAIAOSE, which since 3 October 2001 owns most railway stations in Greece: the company was also in charge of rolling stock from December 2014 until October 2025, when Greek Railways (the owner of the Piraeus–Platy railway) took over that responsibility.

Today, the station houses a restored steam-engine and former Orient Express rollingstock known as "The Train in Rouf". Operating as a theatre since 1997, The museum vehicle is parked on one of the disused platforms and hosts theatrical and musical performances.

== Facilities ==
The station is still housed in a 20th-century brick-built station building, the original being since long demolished. As of 2020 the station is unstaffed, with no staffed booking office; however, there are waiting rooms. Access to the platforms is via a subway under the lines, with wheelchair accessible by elevator. The platforms have shelters with seating; however, there are no dot-matrix display departure and arrival screens or timetable poster boards on the platforms. The station, however, does have a buffet called POYΦ. There is also a taxi rank and parking in the forecourt and infrequent buses do call at the station.

== Services ==
Since 22 November 2025, the following services call at this station:

- Athens Suburban Railway Line A1 between Piraeus and Athens Airport, with up to one train per hour;
- Athens Suburban Railway Line A4 between Piraeus and Kiato, with up to one train per hour.

Bus route 838 and Trolleybus route 21 call at the nearest bus stop, at Petrou Ralli. Until 1960, Rouf station was served by Tram route 4.

== Station layout ==
L Ground/Concourse	Customer service	Tickets/Exits
Level; Ε1	Side platform, doors will open on the right
Level; Ε1	Platform 0	← to Piraeus (Tavros)
Level; Ε1	Platform 1	to Airport / to Kiato (Athens) →
Level; Ε1	Island platform, doors open on the right/left
Level; Ε1	Platform 2	← to Piraeus (Tavros)
Level; Ε1	Through Lines	Lines
Level; Ε1	Platform 4	In non-regular use
Level; Ε1	Island platform, doors to the left
Level; Ε1	Platform 5	In non-regular use
Level; Ε1	Island platform, doors on the right/left
Level; Ε1	Platform 6	In non-regular use

== Gallery ==
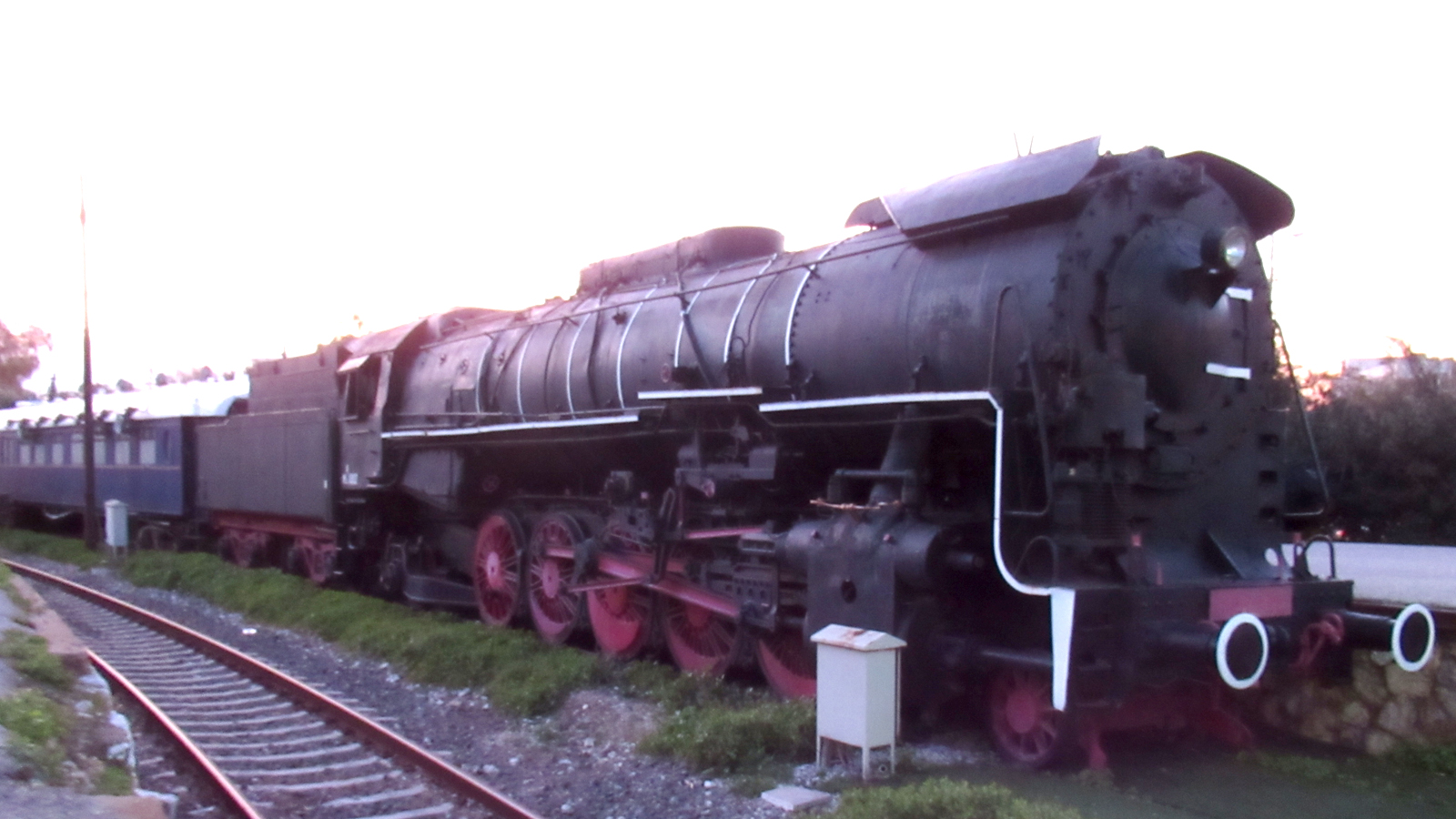
The Train in Rouf, leaded by steam locomotive Μα 1002

== See also ==
- Railway stations in Greece
- Hellenic Railways Organization
- Hellenic Train
- Proastiakos
