= Agioi Anargyroi =

Agioi Anargyroi Άγιοι Ανάργυροι
- Municipal unit
- Location within West Athens regional unit

- Location within Greece
- Coordinates: 38°1.6′N 23°43.1′E
- Country: Greece
- Administrative region: Attica
- Regional unit: West Athens
- Municipality: Agioi Anargyroi-Kamatero

Area
  - Municipal unit: 3.200 km^{2} (1.236 sq mi)
- Elevation: 70 m (230 ft)

Population (2021)
  - Municipal unit: 32,283
  - Municipal unit density: 10,090/km^{2} (26,130/sq mi)
- Time zone: UTC+2 (EET)
  - Summer (DST): UTC+3 (EEST)
- Postal code: 135 xx
- Area code: 210
- Vehicle registration: IB
- Website: www.agan.gov.gr

Agioi Anargyroi (Greek: Άγιοι Ανάργυροι) is a suburban town in the north-central part of the Athens agglomeration, Greece. It takes its name from the "Holy Unmercenaries": saints who received no payment for their medical services. Since the 2011 local government reform it is part of the municipality Agioi Anargyroi-Kamatero, of which it is the seat and a municipal unit.

== Geography ==
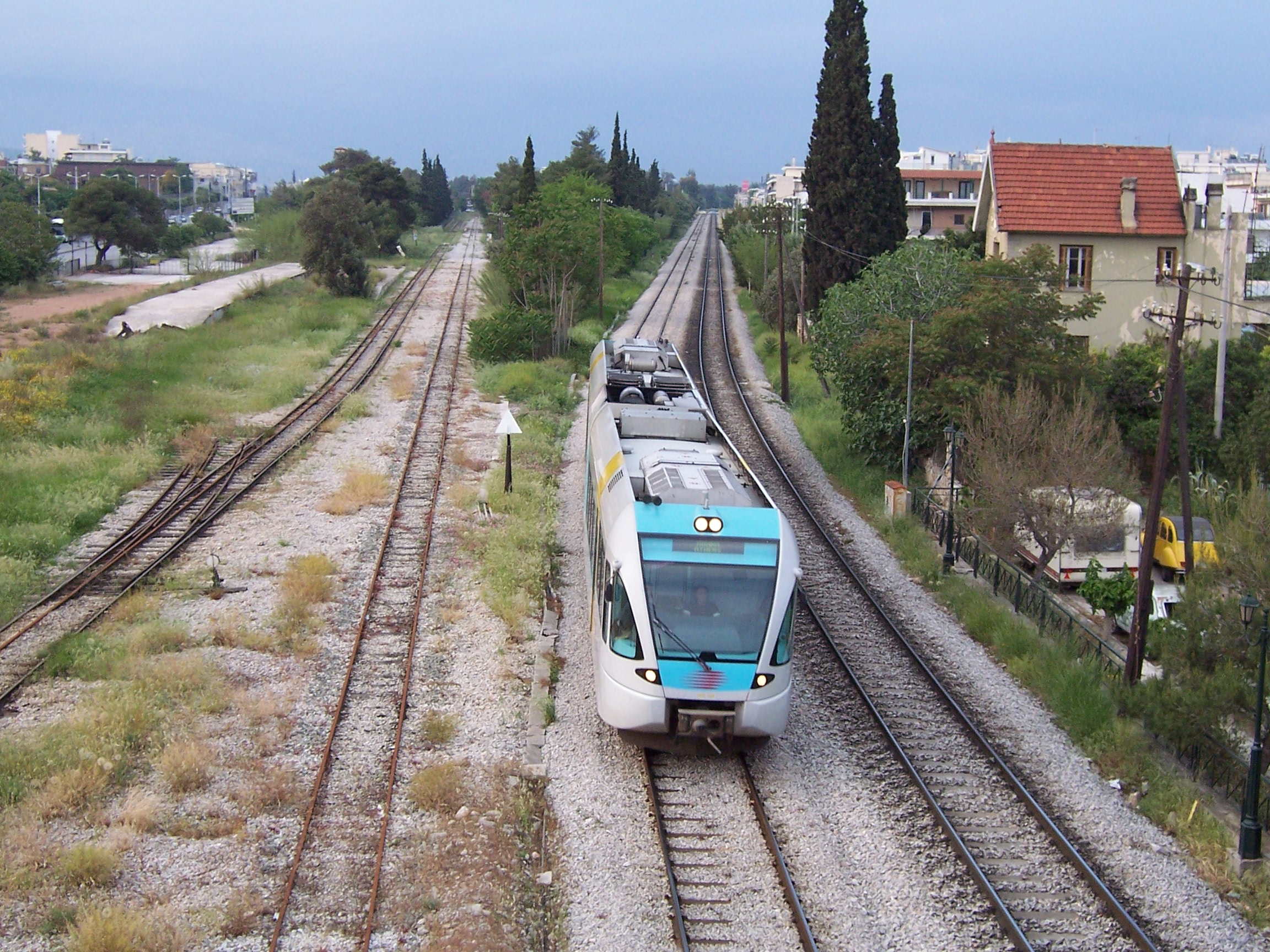
Proastiakos in Agioi Anargyroi coming from the airport to Athens

Agioi Anargyroi is located 5 km (3 mi) north of Athens city centre. The municipal unit has an area of 3.200 km^{2}. Its built-up area is continuous with the municipality of Athens and the neighbouring suburbs Peristeri, Ilion, Kamatero, Acharnes, Nea Filadelfeia and Nea Chalkidona. The A1 motorway (Athens–Thessaloniki–Evzonoi) passes east of the town. Agioi Anargyroi has a station on the Athens–Thessaloniki railway. The old metric Piraeus–Patras railway also passes through the town.

== Historical population ==
Year	Population
1971	26,094
1981	30,320
1991	30,739
2001	32,957
2011	34,168
2021	32,283

== International relations ==
Agioi Anargyroi is twinned with:

- Opole, Poland
