= Tavros railway station =

Passenger station in South Athens, Greece

Ταύρος Tauros

General information
- Location: 2-4 Constantinople & Korytsas Street 118 54, Moschato-Tavros; South Athens; Greece
- Coordinates: 37°58′08″N 23°41′37″E
- Owner: GAIAOSE
- Operator: Hellenic Train
- Line: Piraeus–Platy railway
- Platforms: 2
- Tracks: 3 (1 through lines)

Construction
- Structure type: at-grade
- Depth: 8 (3 in use)
- Platform levels: 1
- Parking: Yes
- Cycle facilities: No
- Accessible: Yes

Other information
- Website: http://www.ose.gr/en/

Key dates
- 30 June 1884: Line opened
- 1 October 2014: Station opened
- 1 February 2018: Line electrified

Services
| Preceding station | Suburban Rail | Following station |
|---|---|---|
| Rentis towards Piraeus | Line A1 | Rouf towards Athens Airport |
| Rentis towards Piraeus | Line A4 | Rouf towards Kiato |
Location

Tavros railway station (Greek: Σιδηροδρομικός σταθμός Ταύρου, romanized: Sidirodromikos stathmos Tauros), signed as Tauros, is a station on the Piraeus–Platy railway line in Tavros, a suburb in the regional unit of South Athens, Attica. It opened on 1 October 2014 to serve Athens Suburban Railway lines to/from Piraeus to Kiato and Athens Airport.

== History ==
The station opened 1 October 2014 by Minister of Transport, Michalis Chrisochoidis. as part of the upgrades and renovation to the line, which also involved electrification of the line. Initially when the station opened, it operated without the use of lifts (expected to come into operateon in early 2015). The station was not foreseen in the initial transport study proposal "Renovation of the railway line and construction of electric drive - signaling - remote control in the section Piraeus - Athens - Three Bridges", as the contract 994/2005 was called. In 2017 OSE's passenger transport sector was privatised as TrainOSE (Now Hellenic Train), currently a wholly owned subsidiary of Ferrovie dello Stato Italiane infrastructure, including stations, remained under the control of OSE.

In January 2019, the station was temporarily closed, following instructions from the OSE. The closure of the station is attributed to technical reasons, according to TrainOSE. The station closed at 17.05 on Thursday, 31 January 2019. In July 2022, the station began being served by Hellenic Train, the rebranded TranOSE.

The station is owned by GAIAOSE, which since 3 October 2001 owns most railway stations in Greece: the company was also in charge of rolling stock from December 2014 until October 2025, when Greek Railways (the owner of the Piraeus–Platy railway) took over that responsibility.

== Facilities ==
The station building is above the platforms, with access to the platform level via stairs or lift. Access to the station is via steps or ramp. The Station buildings are also equipped with toilets and a staffed ticket office. At platform level, there are sheltered seating in a new air-conditioned indoor passenger shelter and Dot-matrix display departure and arrival screens or timetable poster boards on both platforms. There is a small car park on-site, adjacent to the eastbound line. Currently, there is no local bus stop connecting the station.

== Services ==
Since 22 November 2025, the following services call at this station:

- Athens Suburban Railway Line A1 between Piraeus and Athens Airport, with up to one train per hour;
- Athens Suburban Railway Line A4 between Piraeus and Kiato, with up to one train per hour.

== Station layout ==
| L Ground/Concourse | Customer service | Tickets/Exits |
| Level; Ε1 | Platform 1 | ← to Piraeus (Rentis) |
| Level; Ε1 | Island platform, doors will open on the left |
| Level; Ε1 | Platform 2 | to Athens Airport / to Kiato (Rouf) → |

== See also ==
- Railway stations in Greece
- Hellenic Railways Organization
- Hellenic Train
- Proastiakos
