= Peloponnese railway station =

Railway station in Greece

Αθήνα Athina
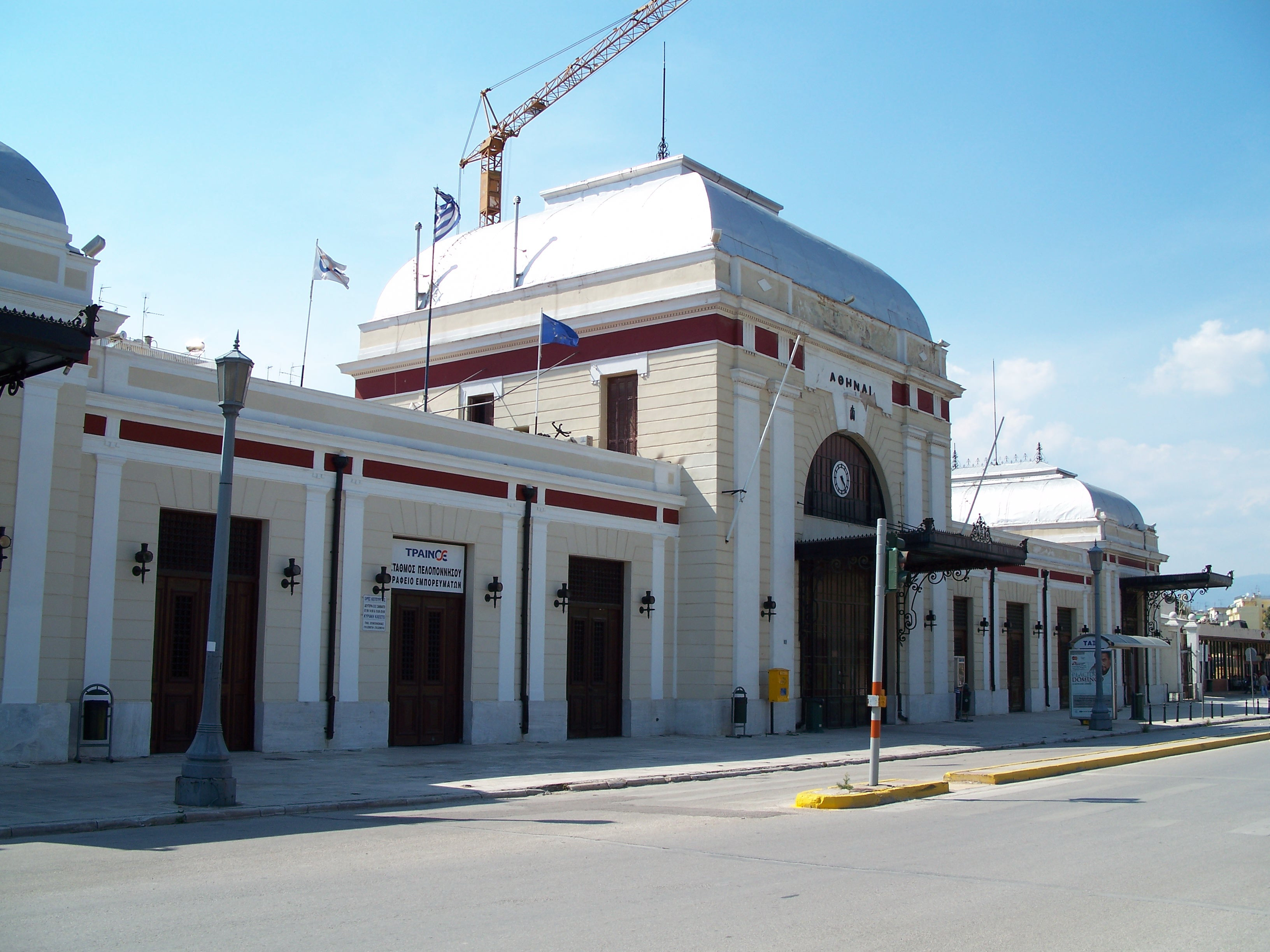
- The former Peloponnese Railway Station in Athens, 2 June 2007

General information
- Location: Konstantinoupoleos & Amfipoleos Ave, 118 54, Athens, Greece
- Coordinates: 37°59′22″N 23°43′09″E
- System: Metre-gauge train station and terminal
- Owner: GAIAOSE

Construction
- Structure type: at-grade
- Depth: 1
- Platform levels: 1
- Accessible: No
- Architect: Alfred Rondell and Abel Gotteland
- Architectural style: Classical

Other information
- Status: Closed
- Website: https://www.hellenictrain.gr/en/peloponnese-railway-station

History
- Opened: 30 June 1884
- Closed: 7 August 2005

Former services
Preceding station	Former railways	Following station
Rouf towards Piraeus	Piraeus–Patras Railway (SPAP)	Agioi Anargyroi (old) towards Patras
Location

The Peloponnese Railway Station (Greek: Σταθμός Πελοποννήσου, romanized: Stathmos Peloponnisou) was a station on the Piraeus, Athens and Peloponnese Railways (SPAP) metre gauge line in Athens. Originally opened on 30 June 1884 it was the first railway terminal in the Greek capital. In 1904, a very short distance from the Peloponnese Station, the "Larissa Station" was inaugurated, the original owner of which was the Hellenic State Railways (SEK), which served trains to and from northern Greece. The station closed in 2005.

== History ==
The Station opened in its original form on 30 June 1884 on what was the Piraeus, Athens and Peloponnese line (or SPAP) build to connect Piraeus and Athens. The station was built to the designs of French engineers, led by Alfred Rondel and chief engineer Abel Gotteland, and later remodelled by 19th-century architect Ernst Ziller. In 1920 Hellenic State Railways or SEK was established, however, many railways, such as the SPAP continued to be run as a separate company, becoming an independent company once more two years later.

Due to growing debts, the SPAP came under government control between 1939 and 1940. During the Axis occupation of Greece (1941–44), Athens was controlled by German military forces, and the line used for the transport of troops and weapons. During the occupation (and especially during German withdrawal in 1944), the network was severely damaged by both the German army and Greek resistance groups. The track and rolling stock replacement took time following the civil war, with regular service levels resumed around 1948. In 1954 SPAP was nationalized once more. In 1962 the SPAP was amalgamated into SEK. In 1970, OSE became the legal successor to the SEK, taking over responsibilities for most of Greece's rail infrastructure. On 1 January 1971, the station, and most of the Greek rail infrastructure was transferred to the Hellenic Railways Organisation S.A., a state-owned corporation. Freight traffic declined sharply when the state-imposed monopoly of OSE for the transport of agricultural products and fertilisers ended in the early 1990s. Many small stations of the network with little passenger traffic were closed down. In 2005 the station closed, with the final service departing the station on 7 August 2005, that same day, the Piraeus-Agioi Anargyroi section of the line also closed. Its activities have since been transferred to the adjacent Larissa station, which now bears only the name "Athens Railway Station".

== Future ==
Today is a listed building of special architectural value and thus protected. OSE future plans include considerations for hosting conferences and larger events in general, as well as a series of investments that will finance the maintenance of the building.

== Gallery ==
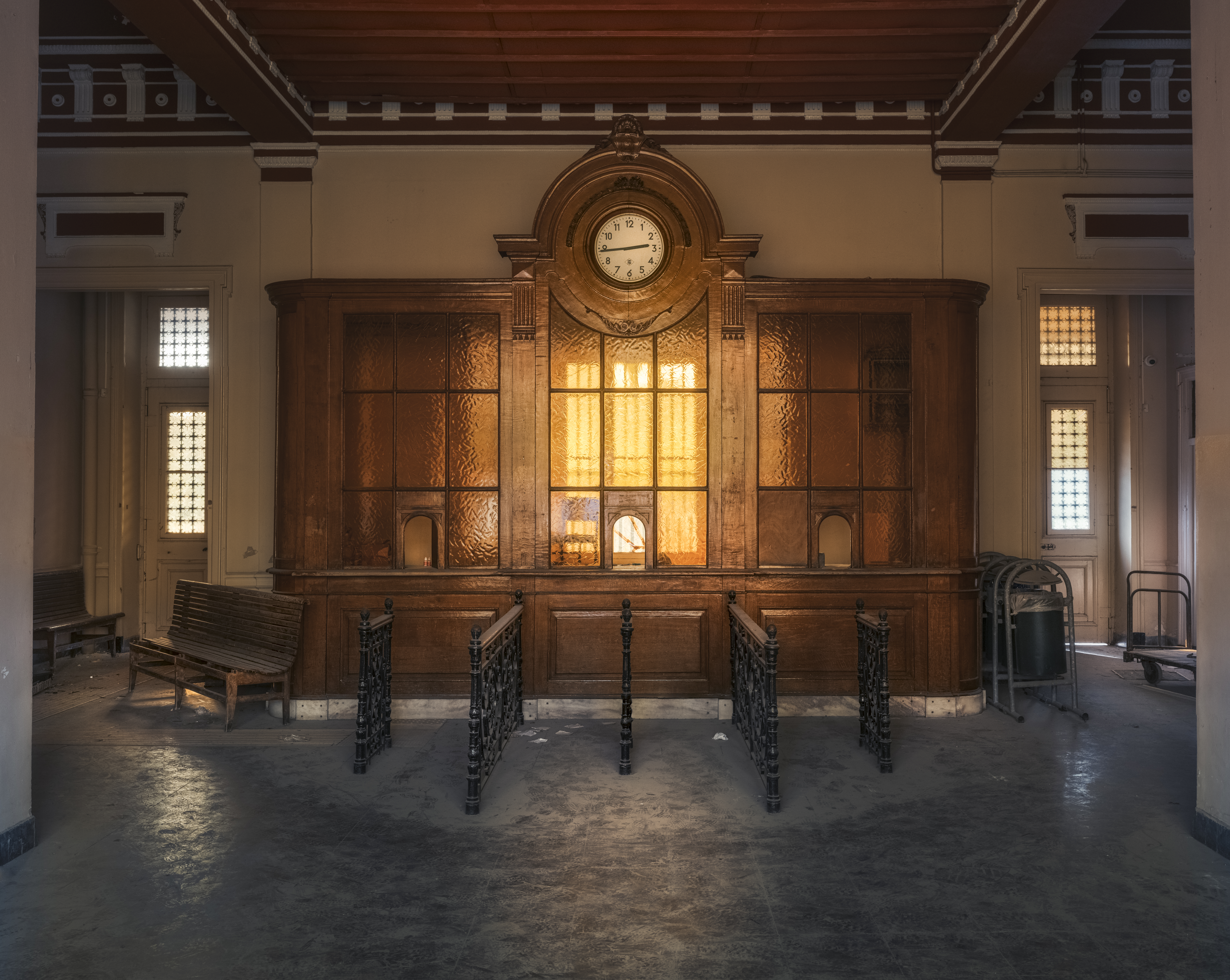
View of the stations booking hall, 13 September 2020.

View of the station building, 13 September 2020.

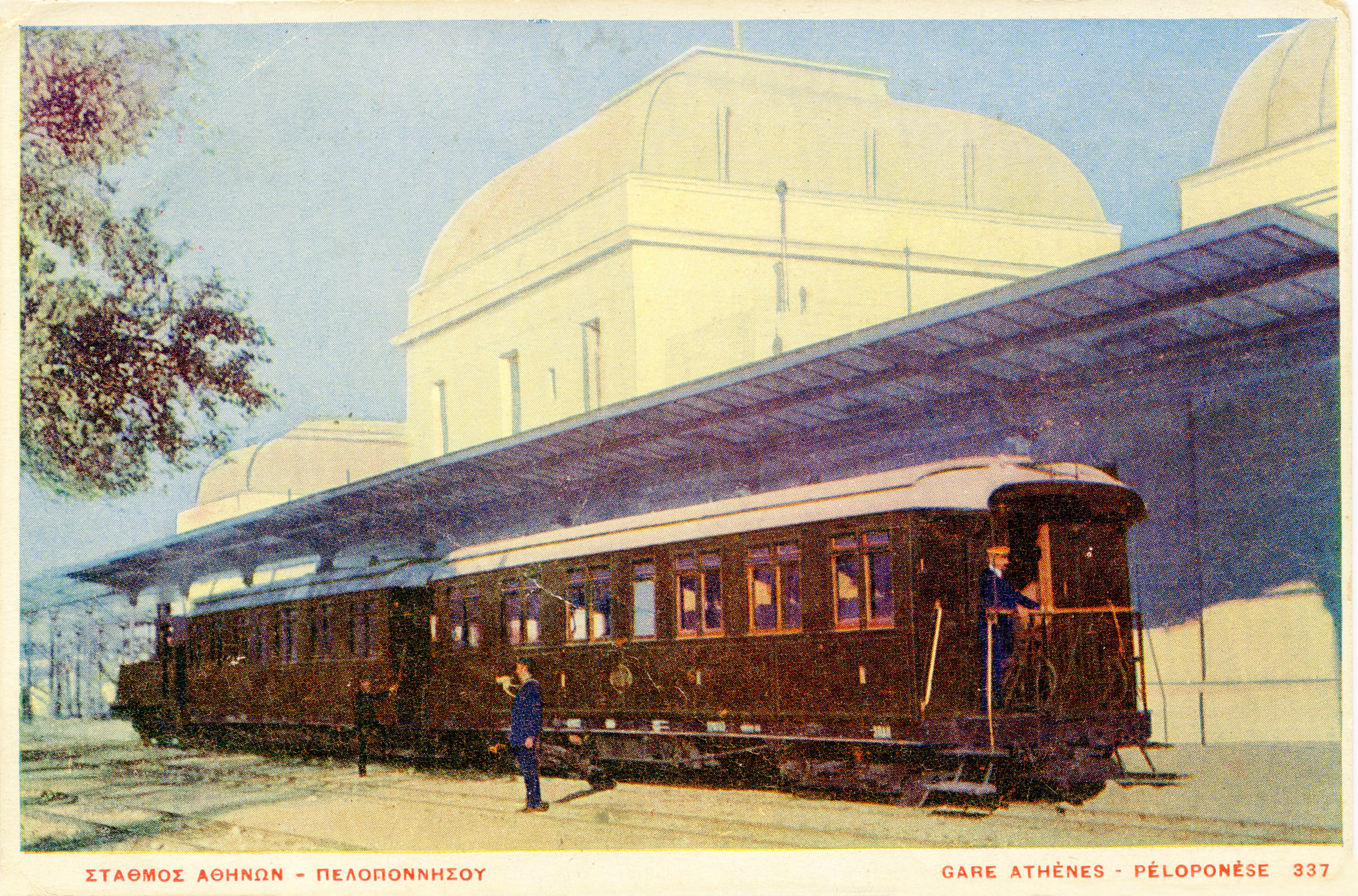
Peloponnese railway station Postcard published by Aspiotis, ca. 1915

== See also ==
- Hellenic Railways Organization
- Hellenic Train
