= Agioi Anargyroi-Kamatero =

Agioi Anargyroi-Kamatero Άγιοι Ανάργυροι-Καματερό
- Municipality
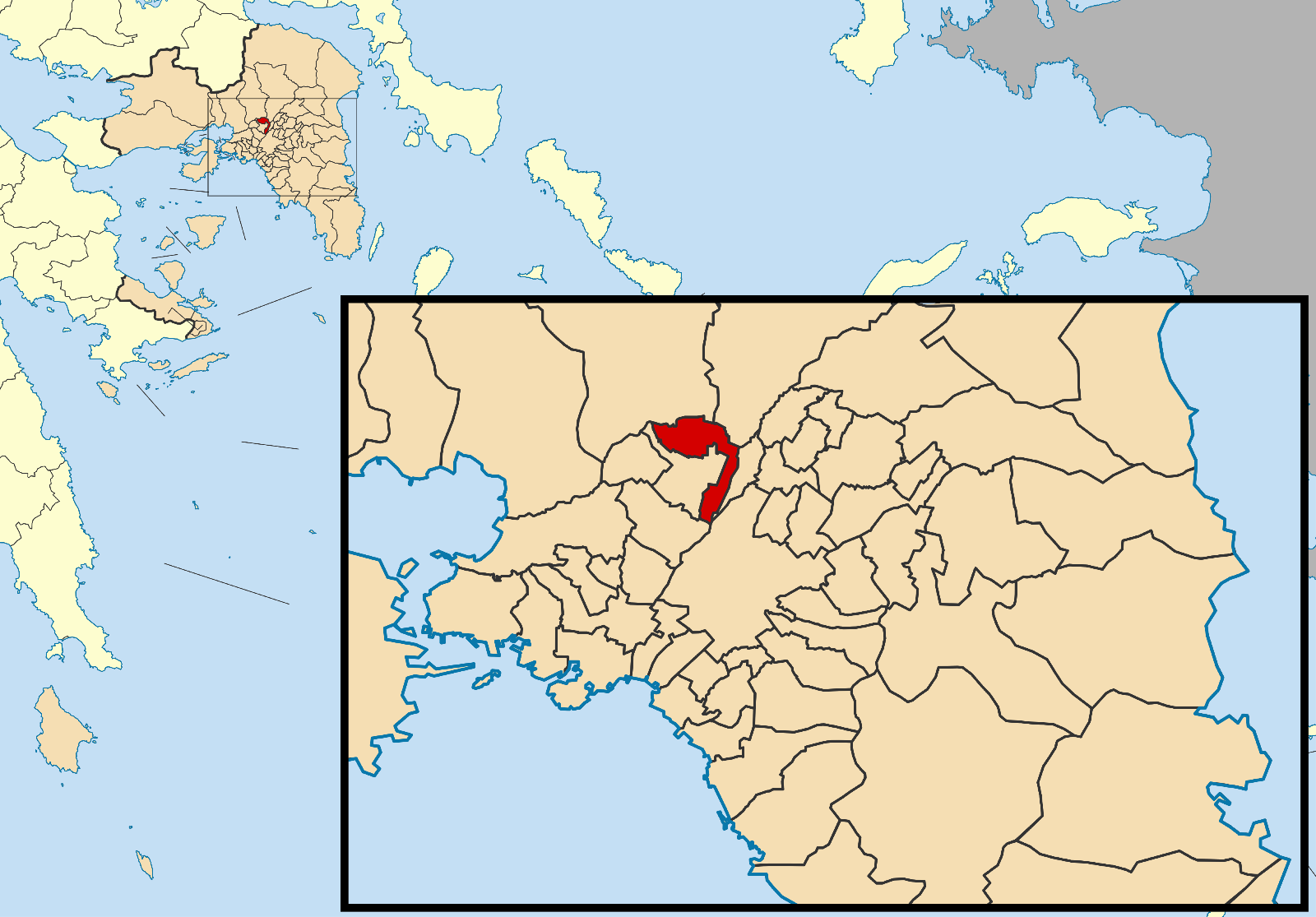

- Location within Greece
- Coordinates: 38°02′N 23°43′E
- Country: Greece
- Administrative region: Attica
- Regional unit: West Athens

Area
  - Municipality: 9.15 km^{2} (3.53 sq mi)

Population (2021)
  - Municipality: 61,462
  - Density: 6,720/km^{2} (17,400/sq mi)
- Time zone: UTC+2 (EET)
  - Summer (DST): UTC+3 (EEST)
- Website: agan.gov.gr

Agioi Anargyroi-Kamatero (Greek: Άγιοι Ανάργυροι-Καματερό) is a municipality in the West Athens regional unit, Attica, Greece. The seat of the municipality is the town Agioi Anargyroi.

== Municipality ==
The municipality Agioi Anargyroi-Kamatero was formed at the 2011 local government reform by the merger of the following 2 former municipalities, that became municipal units:

- Agioi Anargyroi
- Kamatero

The municipality has an area of 9.15 km^{2}.
