= West Athens (regional unit) =

West Athens Περιφερειακή ενότητα Δυτικού Τομέα Αθηνών
- Regional unit
- Municipalities of West Athens

- West Athens within Greece

- Location within Greece
- Coordinates: 38°01′N 23°41′E
- Country: Greece
- Administrative region: Attica
- Seat: Peristeri

Area
  - Total: 66.7 km^{2} (25.8 sq mi)

Population (2021)
  - Total: 478,883
  - Density: 7,180/km^{2} (18,600/sq mi)
- Time zone: UTC+2 (EET)
  - Summer (DST): UTC+3 (EEST)
- Postal code: 12x xx, 13x xx
- Area code: 210

West Athens (Greek: Δυτικός Τομέας Αθηνών) is one of the regional units of Greece. It is part of the region of Attica. The regional unit covers the west-central part of the agglomeration of Athens.

In the last twenty years it has experienced growth, which was contributed to by the establishment of the TEI of Athens and Piraeus, the new workplaces in tertiary production, the theme parks, shopping centres and the general climate of regeneration. Also, the arrival of the Metro and the transport development projects that have been announced have played a catalytic role in demographic development.

The complex is accessible from the northeast via Kifissos Avenue (extension of the Athens-Lamia National Road), from the west via the Athens-Corinthos National Road, and from the northwest via the old Athens-Thebes National Road. Locally, it is mainly served by Thivon Avenue, which runs vertically from Peristeri.

The population of the West Sector unit, according to the census of 2021, is 475,809 inhabitants, and its population density is 7,126.08 inhabitants per square kilometres. Its total area rounds to 66.7 square kilometres.

== Administration ==
As a part of the 2011 Kallikratis government reform, the regional unit West Athens was created out of part of the former Athens Prefecture. It is subdivided into 7 municipalities. These are (number as in the map in the infobox):

- Agia Varvara (2)
- Agioi Anargyroi-Kamatero (3)
- Aigaleo (4)
- Chaidari (5)
- Ilion (6)
- Peristeri (1)
- Petroupoli (7)

== See also ==
- List of settlements in Attica
