= Athens railway station =

Railway and Athens Metro station

Αθήνα Athina Σταθμός Λαρίσης Larissa Station
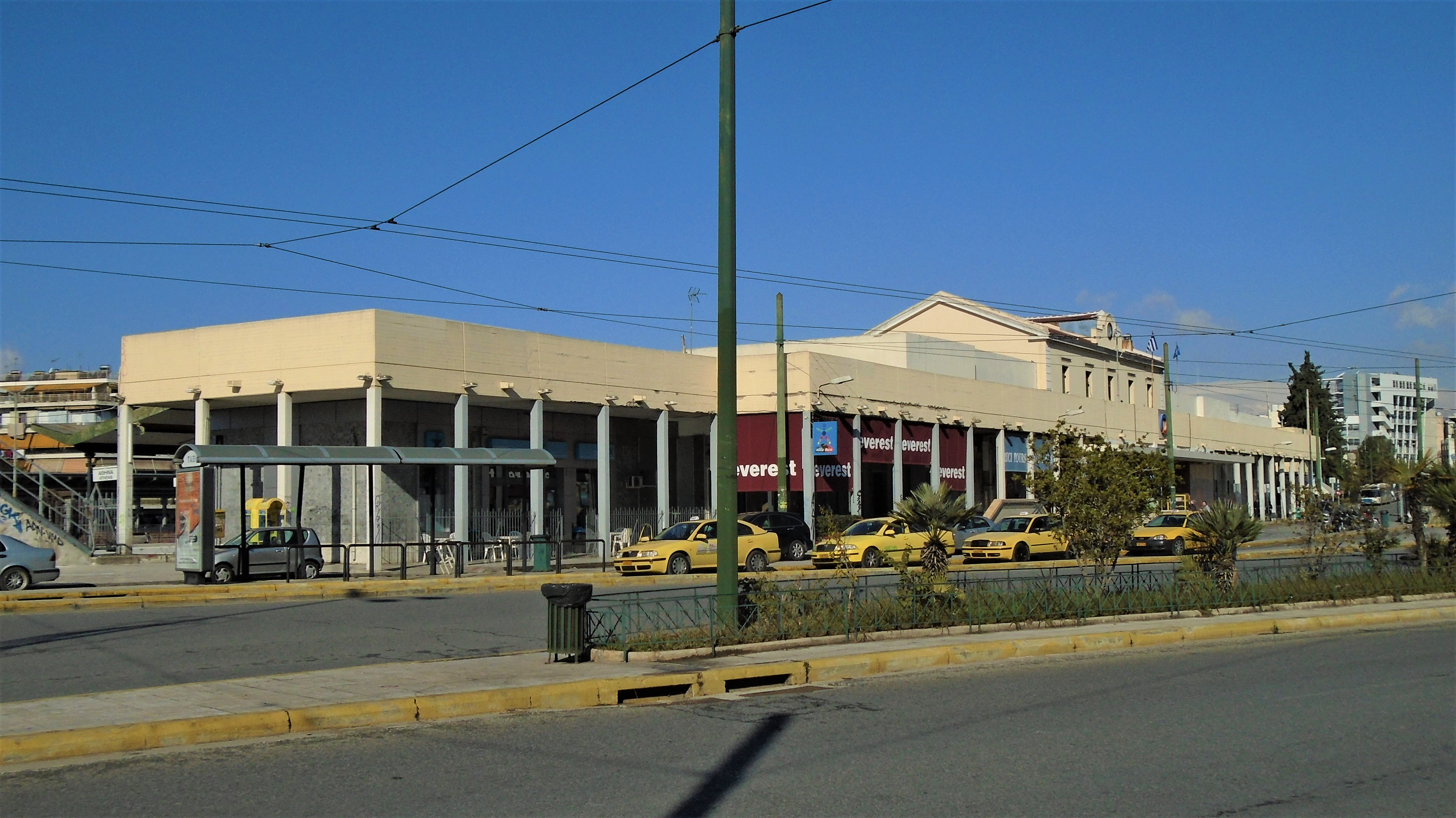
- View of the station building, January 2019

General information
- Location: Domokou Avenue, Kolonos; 104 44 Athens; Greece
- Coordinates: 37°59′32.24″N 23°43′14″E
- Owner: GAIAOSE (Train); STASY (Metro)
- Operator: Hellenic Train (Train); STASY (Metro)
- Lines: Piraeus–Platy railway
- Platforms: 8 (5 operational)
- Tracks: 13 (7 operational)
- Train operators: Hellenic Train (Train); STASY (Metro)
- Connections: Bus; Trolleybus Bus

Construction
- Structure type: At-grade (Suburban Rail & Hellenic Train); Underground (Line 2)
- Platform levels: 2
- Parking: Yes
- Cycle facilities: No
- Accessible: Yes
- Architectural style: Modern

Other information
- Status: Staffed
- Fare zone: 1
- Website: Official website

Key dates
- 8 March 1904: Railway station opened
- 28 January 2000: Metro station opened
- 30 July 2004: Suburban Railway opened
- 30 July 2017: Railway electrified

Services
Preceding station	Hellenic Train	Following station
Terminus	C1 Athens-Thessaloniki	Oinoi towards Thessaloniki
Terminus	C2 Athens-Kalambaka (rail replacement bus)	Acharnes (SKA) towards Kalambaka
Terminus	G1 Athens-Leianokladi	Acharnes (SKA) towards Leianokladi
Preceding station	Suburban Rail	Following station
Rouf towards Piraeus	Line A1	Agioi Anargyroi towards Athens Airport
Rouf towards Piraeus	Line A4	Agioi Anargyroi towards Kiato
Terminus	Line A3	Agioi Anargyroi towards Chalcis
Preceding station	Athens Metro	Following station
Attiki towards Anthoupoli	Line 2	Metaxourgeio towards Elliniko
Location

Athens railway station (Greek: Σιδηροδρομικός Σταθμός Αθηνών, romanized: Sidirodromikos Stathmos Athinon), often referred to as Athens Central on onboard announcements, is the main railway station of Athens and the second-largest station in Greece. Located in the central quarter of Kolonos, the railway station resulted from the merger of two separate railway terminals in 2005—Larissa Station (Σταθμός Λαρίσης, Stathmos Larisis) of the Piraeus–Platy railway towards central and northern Greece, and the Peloponnese Station (Σταθμός Πελοποννήσου, Stathmos Peloponnisou) of the Piraeus–Patras railway that formerly linked Athens with the Peloponnese. The station is still colloquially known as Larissa Station, and is also the name of the adjacent Athens Metro station.

The station is being undergoing a substantial redevelopment, involving track realignment, new signalling and passenger facilities: once complete, the station will have improved access and capacity, new platforms, improved through lines, and better connections with the Metro and Suburban Railway.

== History ==
=== Early History ===
Inaugurated in 1904, the station was named after the city of Larissa (then the northernmost city of the Kingdom of Greece) and the one nearest the northern terminus of the standard-gauge Piraeus–Papapouli railway. The adjacent Peloponnese Station, inaugurated on 30 June 1884, was served by the metre-gauge Piraeus–Patras railway to the Peloponnese.

=== Nationalisation ===
In 1920, Hellenic State Railways or SEK was established; however, many railways, such as the SPAP continued to be run as a separate company, becoming an independent company once more two years later. Due to growing debts, the SPAP came under government control between 1939 and 1940.

During the Axis occupation of Greece (1941–44), Athens was controlled by German military forces, and the line was used for the transport of troops and weapons. During the occupation (and especially during the German withdrawal in 1944), the network was severely damaged by both the German army and Greek resistance groups. The track and rolling stock replacement took time following the civil war, with regular service levels resumed around 1948. In 1954, SPAP was nationalised once more. In 1962, the SPAP was amalgamated into SEK. In 1970, OSE became the legal successor to the SEK, taking over responsibilities for most of Greece's rail infrastructure. On 1 January 1971, the station and most of the Greek rail infrastructure were transferred to the Hellenic Railways Organisation S.A., a state-owned corporation. Freight traffic declined sharply when the deregulation of the transport of agricultural products and fertilisers occurred in the early 1990s.

=== GAIAOSE ===
In 2001 the infrastructure element of OSE was created, known as GAIAOSE; it would henceforth be responsible for the maintenance of stations, bridges and other elements of the network, as well as the leasing and the sale of railway assists. In 2003, OSE launched "Proastiakos SA", as a subsidiary to serve the operation of the suburban network in the urban complex of Athens during the 2004 Olympic Games. In 2005, TrainOSE was created as a brand within OSE to concentrate on rail services and passenger interface.

In 2003, the Hellenic Railways Organisation (OSE) launched the Athens Suburban Railway (Proastiakos) as a subsidiary responsible for the establishment of a suburban rail network in the Athens metropolitan area for the 2004 Summer Olympics. Peloponnese Station was closed on 7 August 2005, along with the metre-gauge line between Piraeus and Agioi Anargyroi. Its services were transferred to Larissis Station upon the opening of the Suburban Railway line to Corinth on 27 September 2005. In 2005, TrainOSE was created as a brand within OSE to concentrate on rail services and passenger interface. In 2008, all Athens Suburban Railway services were transferred from OSE to TrainOSE.

In 2009, with the Greek debt crisis unfolding OSE's Management was forced to reduce services across the network. Timetables were cut back, and routes closed as the government-run entity attempted to reduce overheads. In 2011 it was reported that the Greek government was looking at divestiture of certain high-profile assets of OSE, namely a number of the larger terminal stations, most notably Piraeus, Thessaloniki, Volos, Larissa and Athens. In 2017 OSE's passenger transport sector was privatised as TrainOSE, (Now Hellenic Train) a wholly owned subsidiary of Ferrovie dello Stato Italiane. Infrastructure, including stations, remained under the control of OSE.

The final service departed the unmodernized Larissis Station on 4 June 2017 before it was closed for various upgrades, including the installation of the 25 kV AC, 50 Hz railway electrification system. The upgraded station was reopened on 30 July 2017. The Athens Metro station, inaugurated on 28 January 2000, lies underground and is served by Line 2 between Anthoupoli and Elliniko. In July 2022, the station began being served by Hellenic Train, the rebranded TrainOSE.

The contract for the second phase of the development, worth €42.1 million, was signed on 12 July 2022: the project includes: the reconstruction and electrification of three platforms for tracks 1 to 6; and the replacement of the underground passage and its facilities.

The station building is owned by GAIAOSE, which since 3 October 2001 owns most railway stations in Greece: the company was also in charge of rolling stock from December 2014 until October 2025, when Greek Railways (the owner of the Piraeus–Platy railway) took over that responsibility.

== Facilities ==
The station comprises a large, two-floor building in central Athens. Three platforms and four tracks are currently in use. The second phase of upgrades is underway, including the construction of new tracks and platforms, a central underpass connecting all platforms and the metro station, additional pedestrian underpasses and overpasses, building restoration works and an overhaul of road traffic surrounding the station. In the meantime, trains will continue to use the platforms and tracks built during the previous upgrade, located where the goods yard of the old Peloponnese Station once stood.

== Services ==
Various Hellenic Train services call at the mainline station, including the InterCity and InterCity Express (ETR) service towards Larissa and Thessaloniki, and the Athens Suburban Railway towards the rest of Attica and the northern coast of the Peloponnese.

=== Suburban rail services ===
The station is served by the following lines of the Athens Proastiakos or suburban railway:

- Athens Suburban Railway Line A1 between Piraeus and Athens Airport, with up to one train per hour;
- Athens Suburban Railway Line A3 towards Chalcis, with up to one train every two hours, plus one extra train during the weekday afternoon peak;
- Athens Suburban Railway Line A4 between Piraeus and Kiato, with up to one train per hour.

=== National rail services ===
Before the Tempi train crash and Storm Daniel in 2023, the following weekday following Hellenic Train services called at this station:

- InterCity Express (ETR): two trains per day in each direction, to Thessaloniki;
- InterCity (IC): five trains per day in each direction to Thessaloniki with additional stops, and one train per day in each direction, to Kalambaka;

Regular InterCity services still run, but they are infrequent until long-term repair works are completed.

=== Former international services ===
During the twentieth century, especially in the first half, Athens station was the terminus for some international trains, such as an Express to Berlin (departing from the former Anhalter Bahnhof) or the "Arlberg" route of the Orient Express (London-Athens via Paris-Zürich-Vienna-Budapest-Belgrade-Skopje), in service until 1962 and then of the Direct Orient Express (Paris-Lausanne-Venice-Ljubljana-Zagreb-Belgrade-Skopje) until 1976.

=== Local public transport ===
==== Metro ====
The underground Larissa Station is served by Athens Metro Line 2 trains towards Anthoupoli to the north, and Elliniko to the south.

==== Bus and trolleybus ====
As of August 2026:

- Bus routes 790, A10, A15, B10 and B15, and trolleybus route 1 serve the station from Theodore Diligiannis Street, to the east of the station;
- Bus routes 719 and B5 call from nearby Filadelfeias Street, to the east of the station;
- Bus route 057 calls from Konstantinoupoleos Avenue, to the west of the station.

Hellenic Train's rail replacement bus services operate from the station's eastern forecourt.

== Station layout ==
Level; L1	Platform 11	Not in regular use
Level; L1	Island platform, doors will open on the left, right
Level; L1	Platform 10	to Chalcis (Agioi Anargyroi) →
Level; L1	Platform 9	← to Piraeus (Rouf)
Level; L1	Island platform, doors will open on the left, right
Level; L1	Platform 8A	towards Thessaloniki (Oinoi / Larissa) →
Level; L1	Platform 8Β	towards Leianokladi (SKA) →
Level; L1	Platform 7	to Athens Airport / to Kiato (Agioi Anargyroi) →
Level; L1	Island platform, doors will open on the right
Level; L1	Platform 6	Under reconstruction
Level; L1	Platform 5	Under reconstruction
Level; L1	Island platform, doors will open on the left, right
Level; L1	Platform 4	Under reconstruction
Level; L1	Platform 3	Under reconstruction
Level; L1	Island platform, doors will open on the left, right
Level; L1	Platform 2	Under reconstruction
Level; L1	Platform 1	Under reconstruction
Level; L1	Side platform, doors will open on the right
Ground/Councourse; G/C	Customer service	Shops/Buffet; Tickets/Exits
Theodorou Diligianni Street
Ground/Concourse; G/C	Customer service	Tickets; Exits
Level; L2	Side platform, doors will open on the right or interchange to /
Level; L2	Platform 12	← towards Elliniko (Metaxourgeio)
Level; L2	Platform 13	→ towards Anthoupoli (Attiki) →
Level; L2	Side platform, doors will open on the right or interchange to /

== Upgrades ==
The work comprises the construction of lines 1-6, part of the underground crossing providing a connection to all the platforms and the connection to “Larissa” station, of Attiko Metro S.A. as well as the inclusion of provisional sheds and E/M works at ground level. The works will be implemented without rail traffic interruption, with the electrified right half corridor of the Railway Station (Lines 7-10) in operation and the uninterrupted passenger access from the east (Diligianni street) and the west (Konstantinoupoleos street) secured. Public infrastructure-project reporting for 2025 still lists the upgrade among active railway modernisation efforts, without a specific completion date.

== Gallery ==
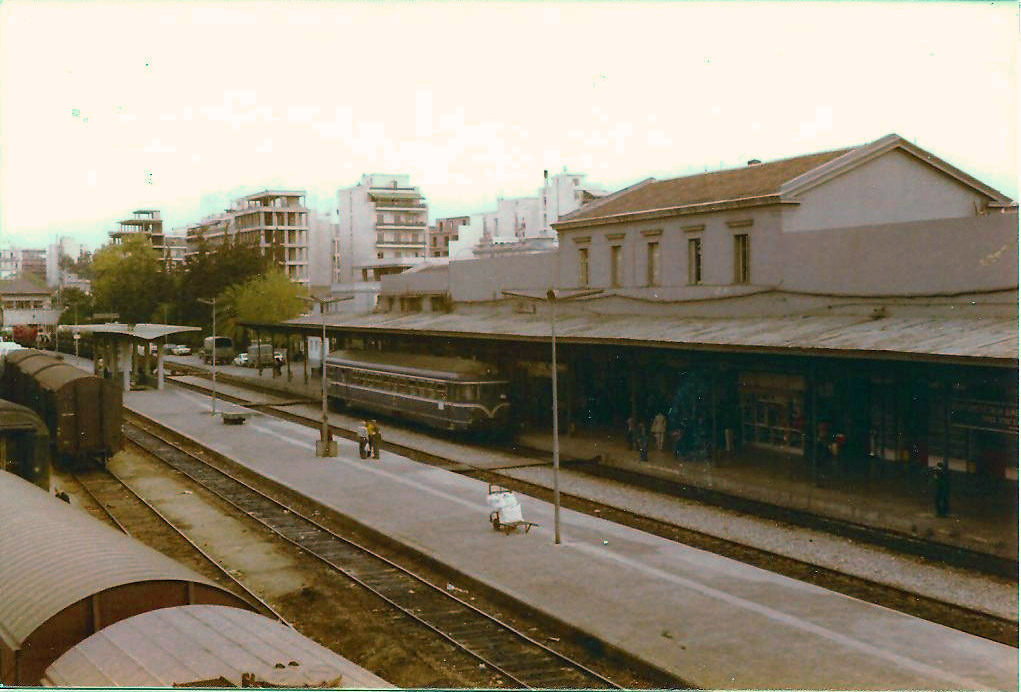
View of the station with metre gauge and normal gauge rails, 1979.

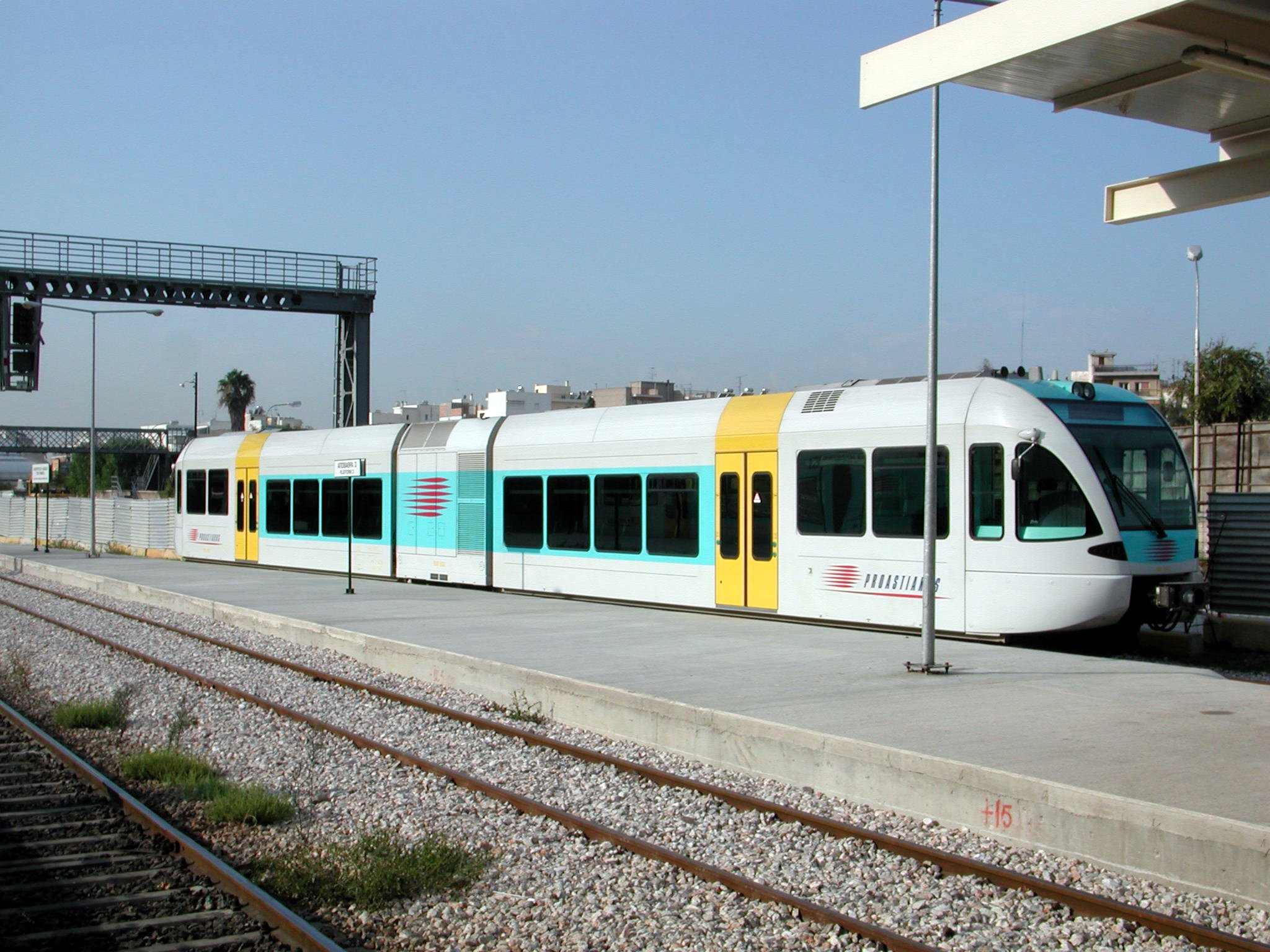
A Athens Suburban Railway DMU at the station in 2005, before electrification in 2017.

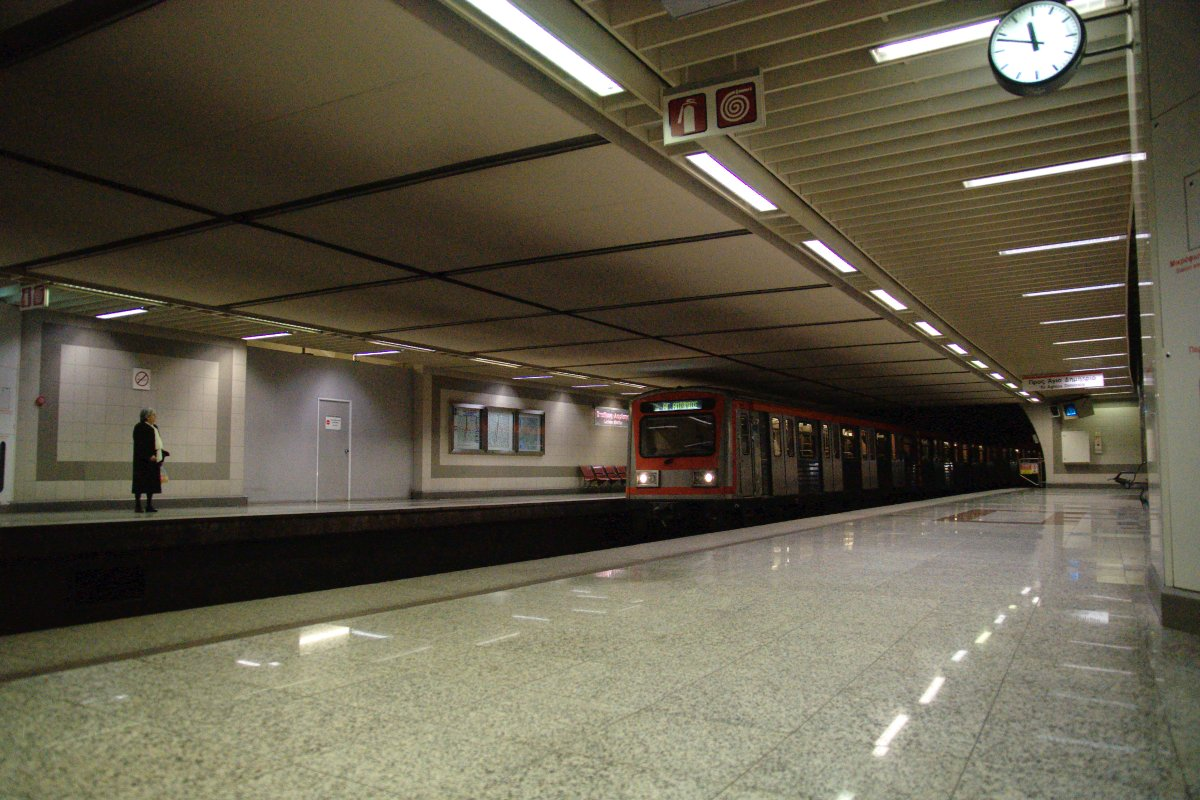
An Alstom first-generation EMU at the metro station, 2010.

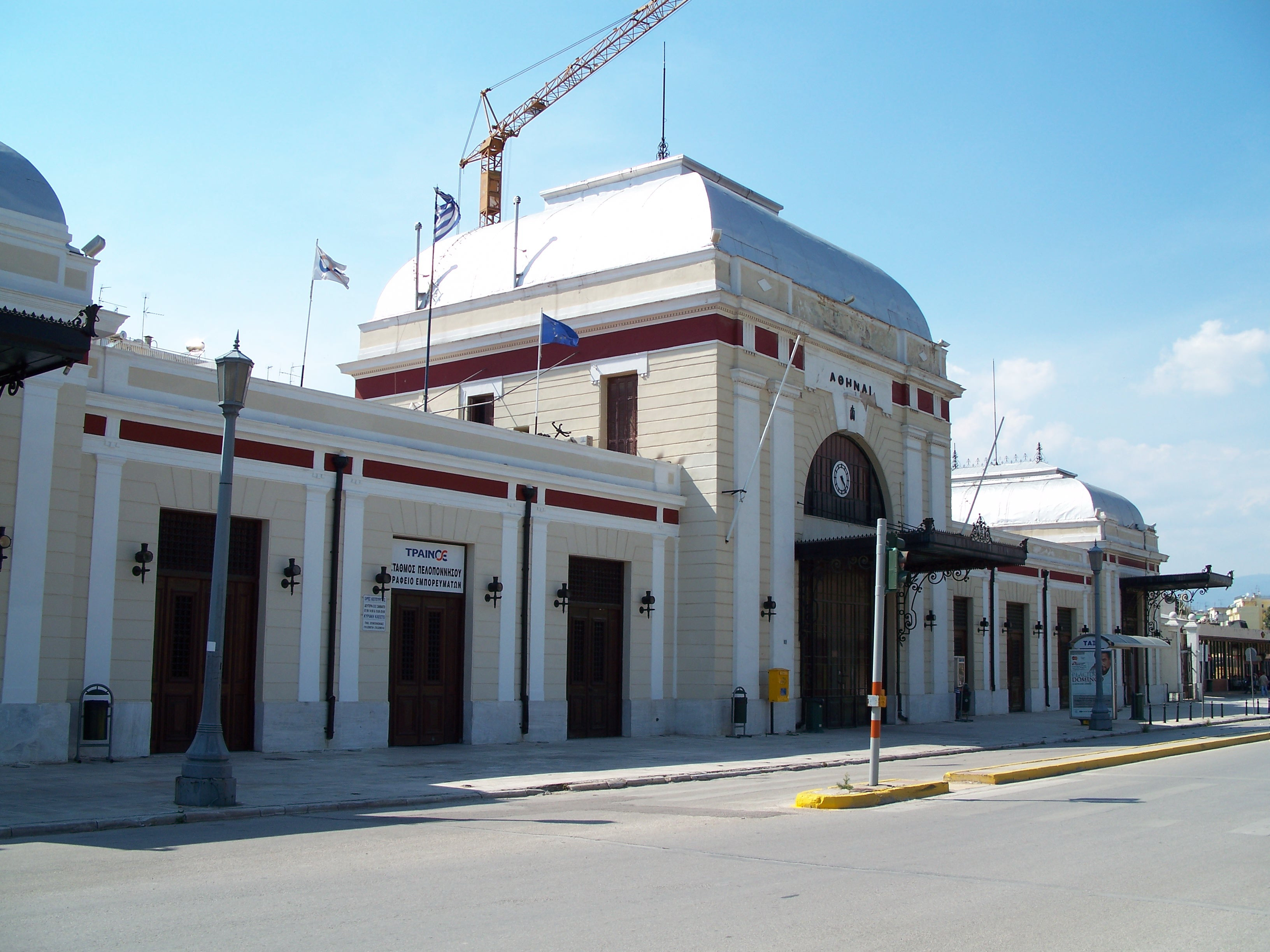
The heritage-listed building of the now closed Peloponnese Station, 2007.

== See also ==
- Railway stations in Greece
- Hellenic Railways Organisation
- Hellenic Train
- Thessaloniki railway station
- P.A.Th.E./P.
- Athens Suburban Railway
- Railways of Greece
