= Transport in Greece =

Economy of Greece

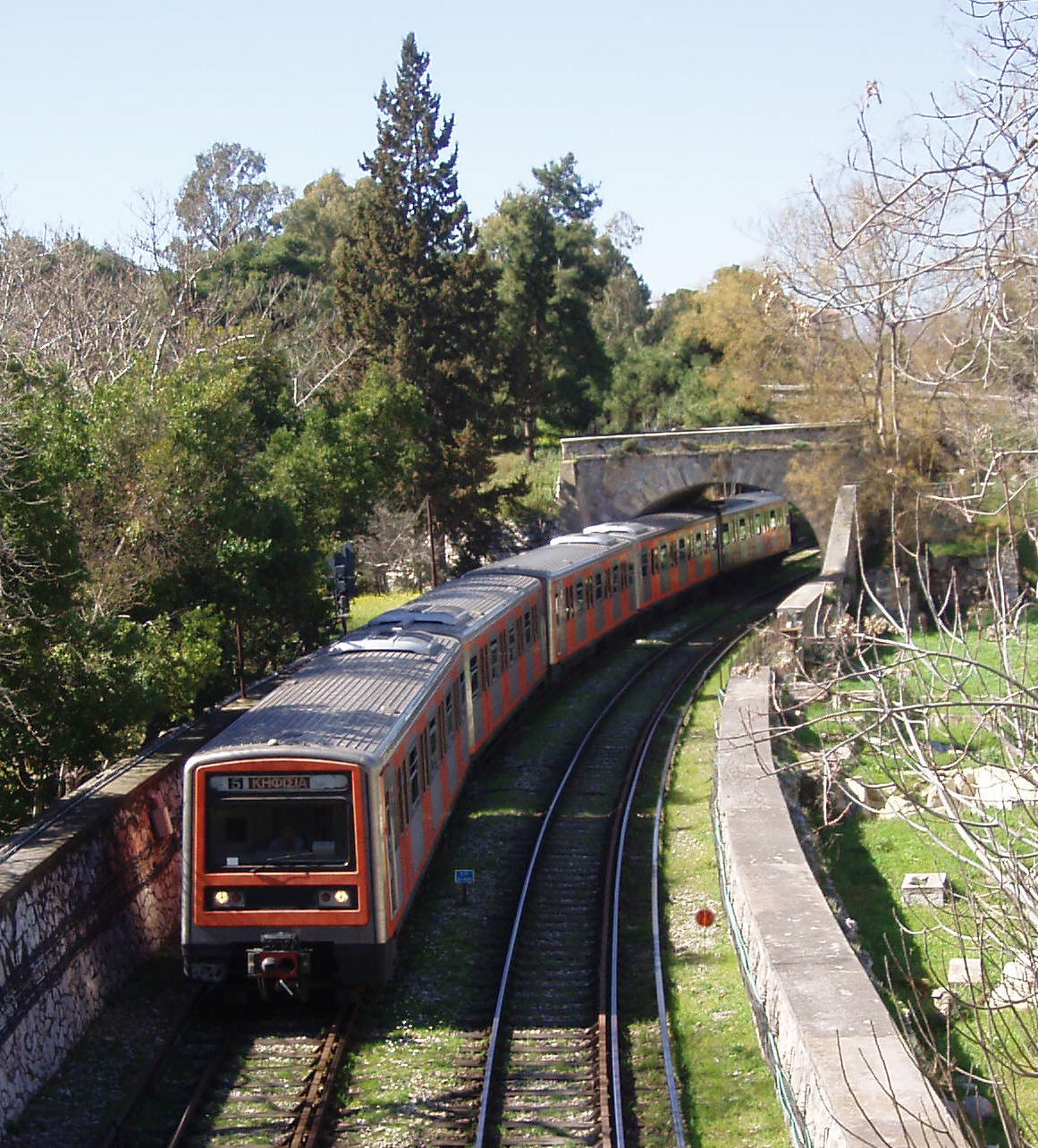
Metro Line 1, the oldest Metro line of Athens Urban area

Transport in Greece has undergone significant changes in the past two decades, vastly modernizing the country's infrastructure and transportation.

Although ferry transport between islands remains the prominent method of transport between the nation's islands, improvements to the road infrastructure, rail, urban transport, and airports have all led to a vast improvement in transportation.

These upgrades have played a key role in supporting Greece's economy, which in the past decade has come to rely heavily on the construction industry.

== Rail transport ==
Railways in Greece hold a history which began in 1869 with the completion of the then Athens & Piraeus Railway.

From the 1880s to the 1920s, the majority of the network was built reaching its heyday in 1940. From the 1950s onward, the railway system entered a period of decline, culminating in service cuts in 2011. Ever since the 1990s, the network has been steadily modernized, but still remains smaller than its peak length.

A total of 2,571 km (1,598 mi) rails exist in Greece. A total of 764 km or 475 mi of track are, or will be, electrified. 1,565 km (972 mi) of track run on the 1,435 mm (4 ft 8 1/2 in) gauge, with 961 km (597 mi) of track still running on 1,000 mm (3 ft 3 3/8 in) gauge. There are also small instances of the 750 mm (2 ft 5 1/2 in) and the dual gauge in Greece.

=== Operation ===
Greece is a member of the International Union of Railways (UIC).

The state-owned company that owns and maintains Greece's railway network is Greek Railways, which also owns and maintains railway stations, while Hellenic Train is the company responsible for operating all passenger trains and the most freight trains. Hellenic Railways was established in August 2025 from the merger by the Government of Greece of infrastructure manager Hellenic Railways Organisation, project delivery subsidiary ERGOSE, and property and rolling stock company GAIAOSE. It was established in response to the Tempi train crash.

=== Commuter rail ===
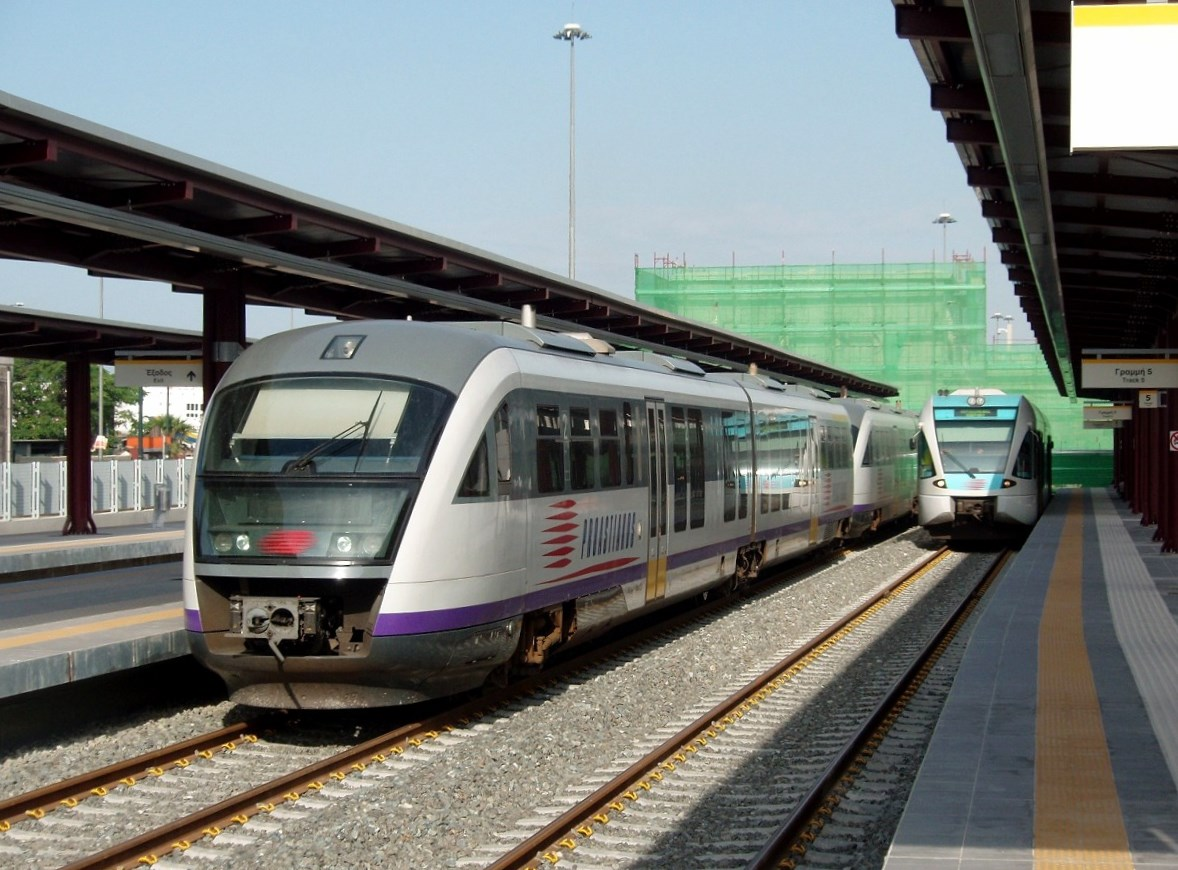
Proastiakos commuter rail

Greece commuter rail service is called Proastiakos and is run by Hellenic Train on rail infrastructure owned by the Greek Railways (buildings and Trains). These services connect a participating city's central railway station to important locations such as a city's port or airport, as well as its suburbs and occasionally nearby towns and cities.

As of September 2020, there are three Proastiakos networks serving the country's three largest cities: Athens, Thessaloniki, and Patras, providing them with commuter rail links towards their suburbs and also with regional services to other cities and towns. In 2016, the three systems carried 10.1 million passengers.

As of 8 January 2017, the lines between the central stations of Athens and Halkida have been electrified, allowing EMU train service. The lines have been changed, making Athens's central station the main layover station. Those lines are Athens – ATH, Athens – Kiato, Athens – Chalcis.

In Thessaloniki, there are two Proastiakos services. The first connects the city's Main Railway Station with the cities of Katerini and Larissa, and the second links the city with Edessa.

In July 2010, a new commuter rail service was launched in Patras on a section of the old Patras–Kyparissia line reconnecting the city with Rio. The service was later extended to Agios Andreas as Line P2. In 2020 services were reconnected to Kato Achaia via Agios Andreas as Line P1.

== Road transport ==
=== Highways ===
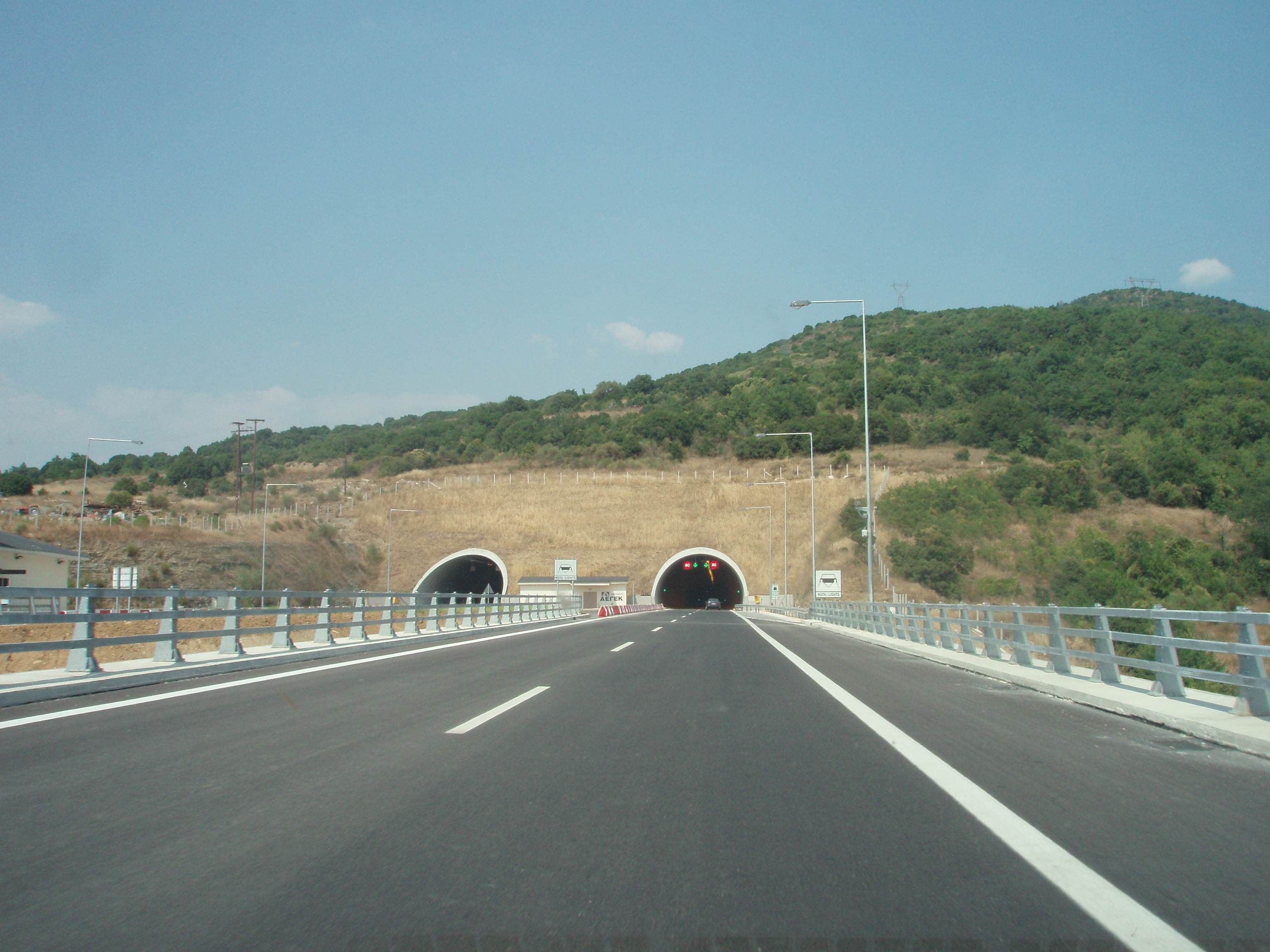
A2 motorway (Egnatia Odos)

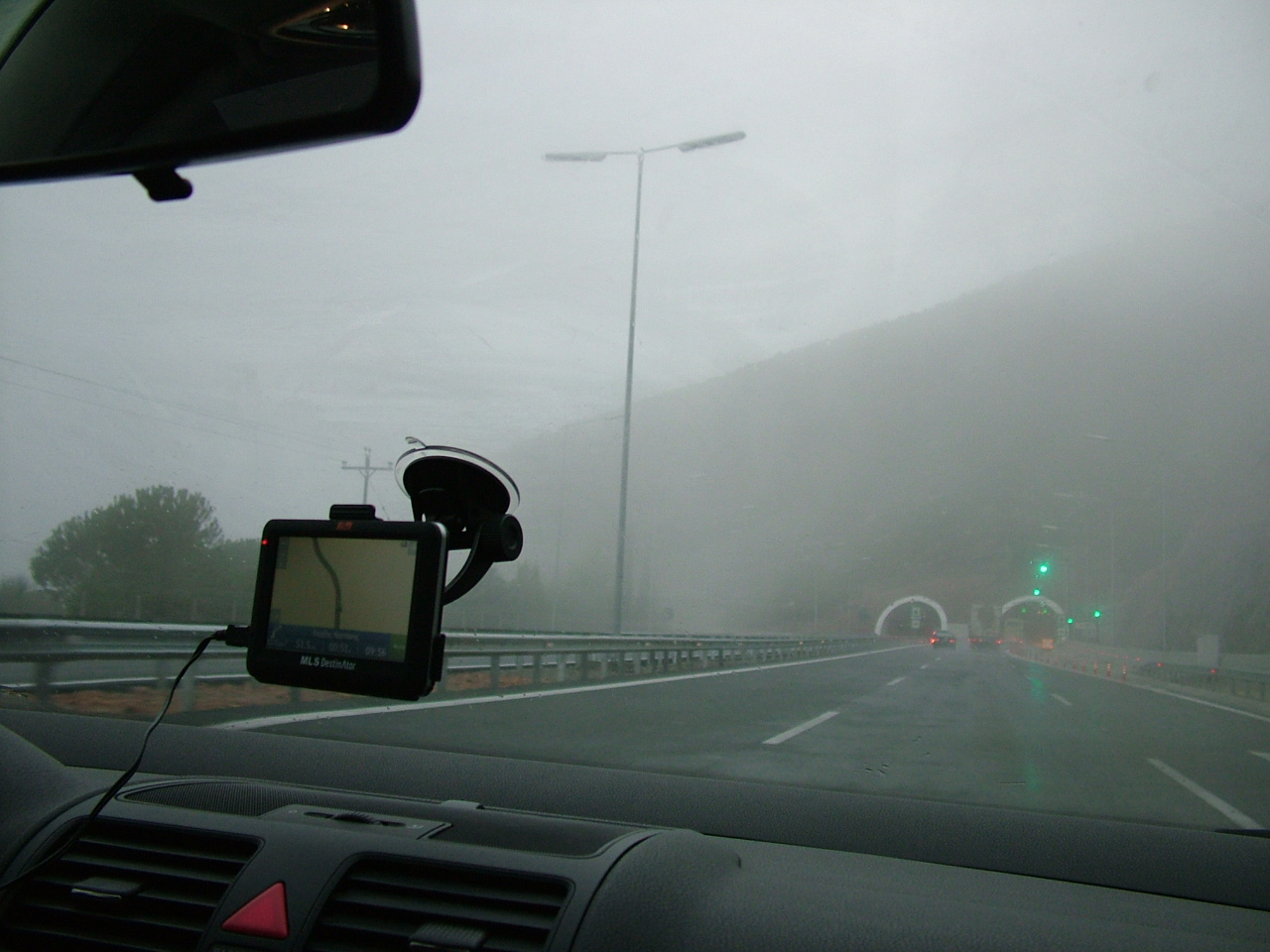
Moreas Motorway.

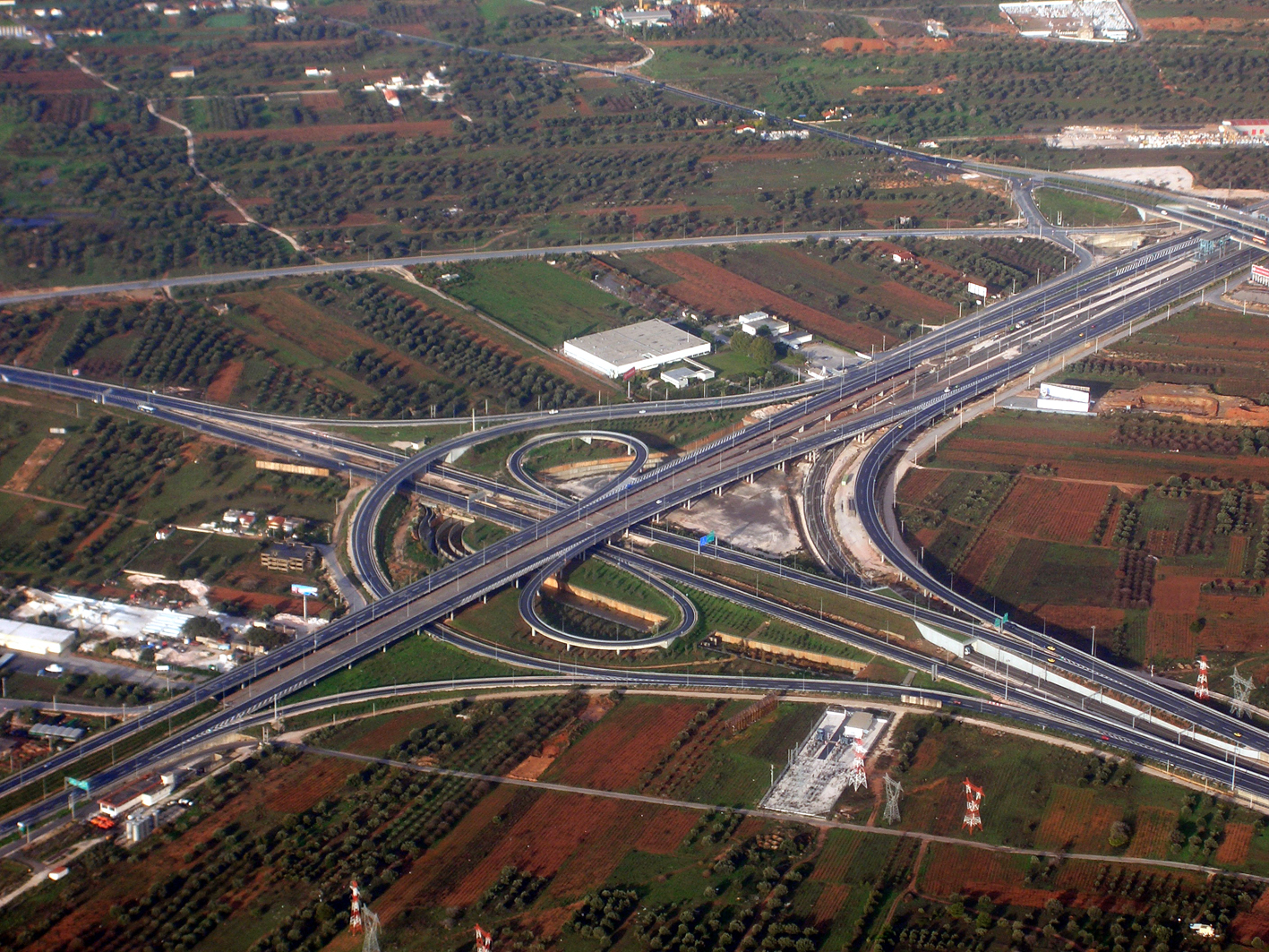
Attiki Odos, near the Athens International Airport

The Motorways in Greece constitute the main road network of the country. A motorway in Greece is distinct in terms of its construction specifications. The main difference is that motorways (Greek: Αυτοκινητόδρομοι) adhere to higher quality construction standards than National Roads (Greek: Εθνικές Οδοί).

The longest motorway in the country is the A2 motorway (also known as the Egnatia Odos (Greek: Εγνατία Οδός)); a tolled controlled-access highway in northern Greece that runs from the western port of Igoumenitsa to the eastern Greek–Turkish border at Kipoi. The entire route is part of the Greek section of the E90 road, which runs from Lisbon, Portugal in the west, and Zakho, Iraq in the east.

=== National roads ===
National roads (Greek: Εθνική Οδός) are all-purpose trunk roads: they are less important than a motorway but more important than a provincial road. The layout of the national road network varies a lot, ranging from fast multi-lane dual carriageways to twisting two-lane single carriageways.

The current system of national roads in Greece was created in July 1963, and have been updated many times since then. Most national roads have route numbers that begin with "EO", non-continuously from EO1 to EO99, but some (such as Thessaloniki Inner Ring Road) have no number.

=== Electric vehicles ===
As of September 2022, there were 8,790 battery electric vehicles registered in Greece. As of September 2022, 11.8% of new cars registered in Greece were electric.

== Public transport ==
=== Rapid transit ===
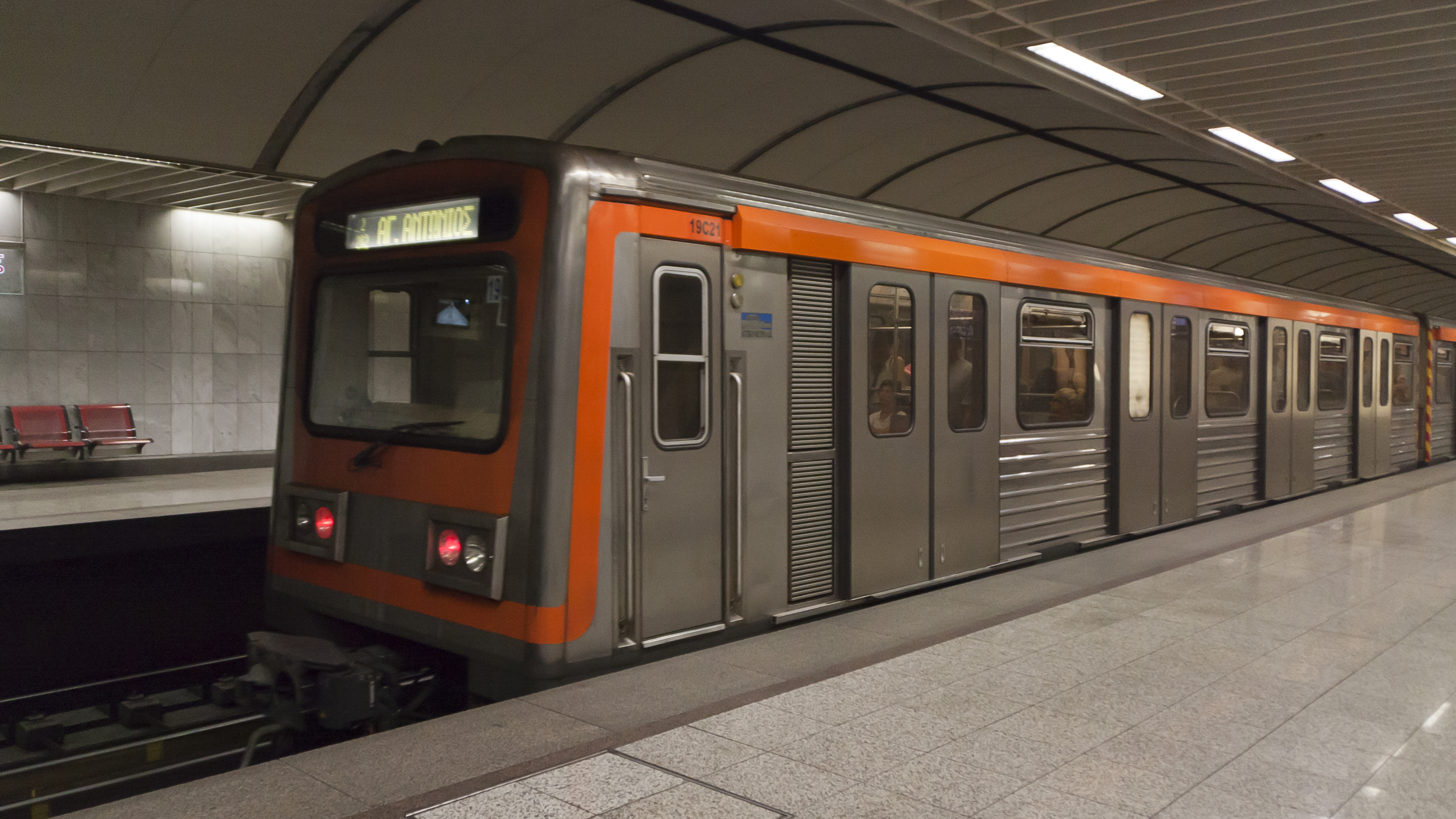
Athens Metro Train (1st Generation)

Greece is served by two rapid transit systems; one in Athens and one in Thessaloniki.

In Athens, Line 1 opened as a single-track conventional steam railway in 1869 and was electrified in 1904. Beginning in 1991, Elliniko Metro S.A. constructed and extended Lines 2 and 3.

It has significantly changed Athens by providing a much-needed solution to the city's traffic and air pollution problem, as well as revitalising many of the areas it serves. Extensions of existing lines are under development or tender, like the Line 2 extension to Ilion where tender started in 2023, as well as a new Line 4, whose central section began construction in October 2021.

The Athens Metro is actively connected with the other means of public transport, such as buses, trolleys, the Athens Tram and the Athens Suburban Railway. The Athens Metro is hailed for its modernity (mainly the newer lines 2, 3), and many of its stations feature works of art, exhibitions and displays of the archaeological remains found during its construction.

Proposed during the 1910s and reconsidered during the 1980s, construction of Thessaloniki Metro began in 2006. It began operations on 30 November 2024, while the 5 new stations of the Kalamaria extension were opened in 27 August 2026. The system in Thessaloniki consists of two lines with 18 stations in total, 13 on Line 1 and 16 on Line 2, with the section between New Railway Station and 25 Martiou being shared by the two lines. It is fully automated and driverless, the first system of its kind in Greece, and is operated by Thessaloniki Metro Automatic (THEMA), a Franco-Italian consortium.

=== Tram ===
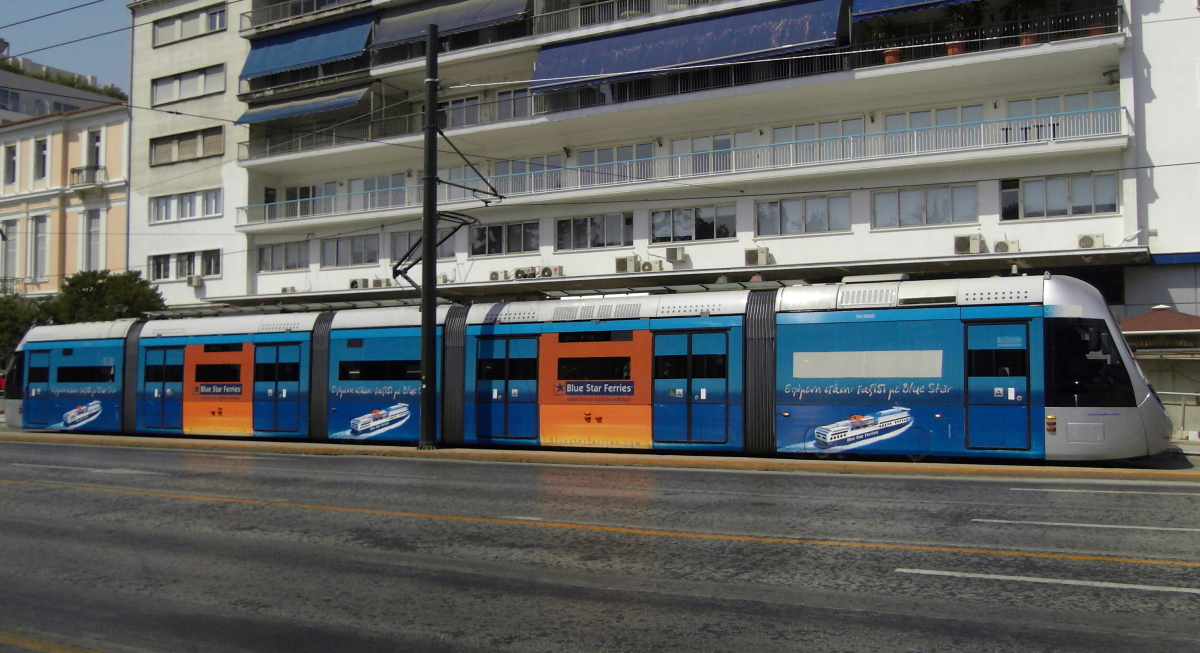
Athens Tram

The Athens Tram, opened in 2004, in time for Summer Olympics 2004 currently consists of two routes, Lines 6 and 7. It is the only operating tramway system in Greece; however, historically, trams existed in Greece; they were horse-drawn or electric.

Athens Tram routes
Line	Colour^{a}	Opening date	Last extended	Length	Route	Stops
Athens Tram Line 6	Green	2004	2004	18.2 km (11.3 mi)	Syntagma – Pikrodafni	19
Athens Tram Line 7	Green	2004	2026	16.1 km (10.0 mi)	Akti Poseidonos – Asklepieio Voulas	43

=== Bus transport ===
==== Urban bus transport ====
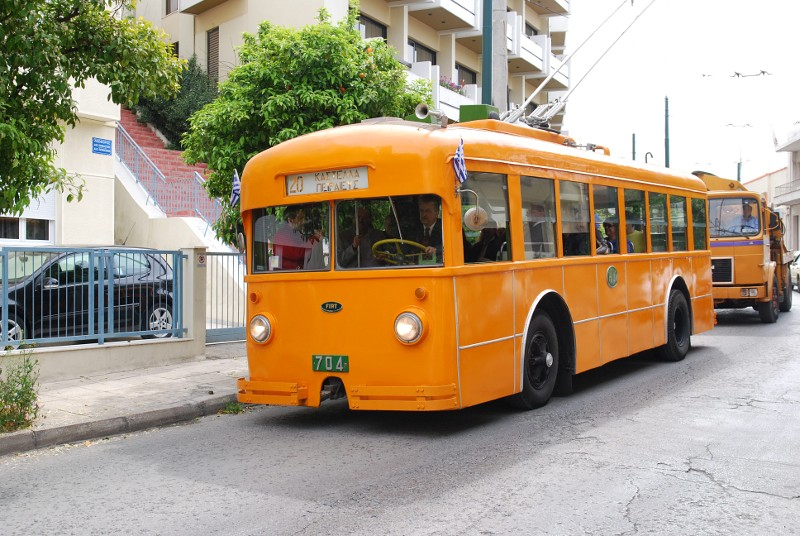
Preserved vintage trolleybus of O.SY., Piraeus-Kastella line

- OSY subsidiary of Transport for Athens (OASA) organizes mass bus (Busses and trolleybuses) transit in Athens.
- OASTH organizes mass bus transit in Thessaloniki.
- Companies named Astiko KTEL provide mass bus transit in many of the other cities of Greece.

==== Intercity and regional bus transport ====
KTEL is the common name for every company which is responsible for intercity and regional bus transit. Most of the regional units, though, have their own regional network of buses, and have their regional unit names labeled on KTEL vehicles that operate there. (e.g. KTEL Argolidas).

There are 4 major bus terminals in Greece, the biggest is in Thessaloniki (Macedonia Inter city bus terminal) which serves all of Greece while Athens has 2 separate bus terminals serving different parts of Greece (Kifissos bus terminal and Liossion bus terminal). A new Athens bus terminal in Elaionas will replace the two separate terminals and serve all of Greece with completion by 2026. A new bus terminal in Patras which will replace the old one is currently under construction in Agios Dionyssios just 200m from the current one and it will open in late 2024 after many delays due to COVID-19 pandemic and the 2022 Russian invasion of Ukraine.

== Water transport ==
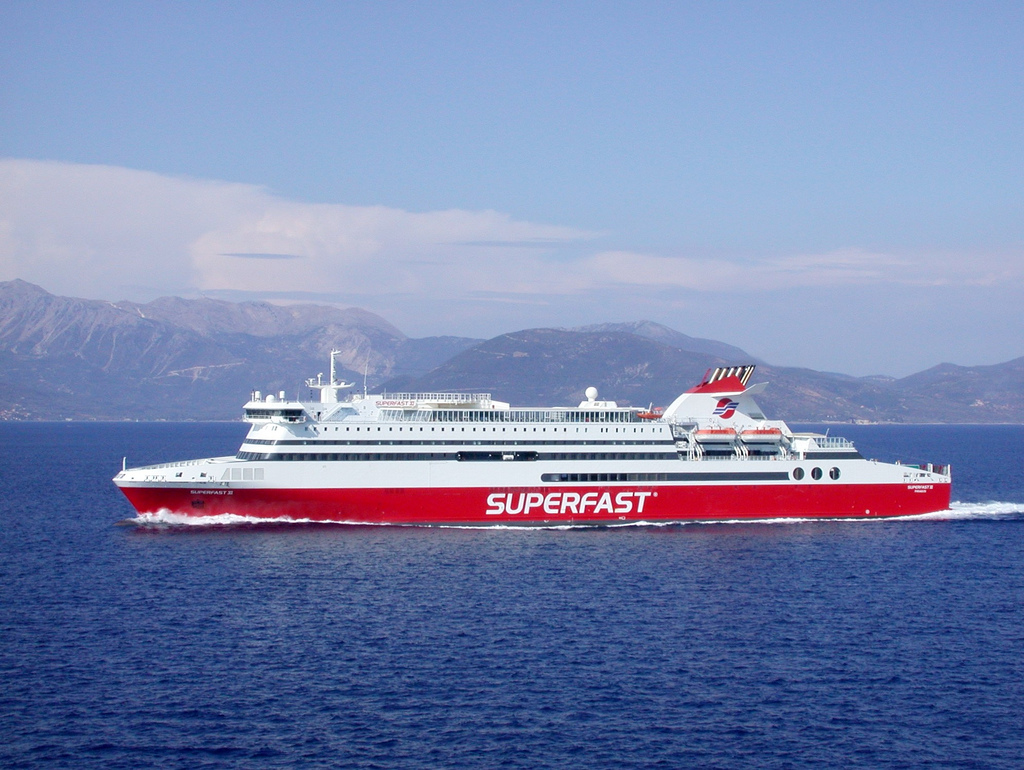
MS Superfast XI bound to Ancona passing Kefalonia island.

Greece is a maritime nation by tradition, as shipping is arguably the oldest form of occupation of the Greeks and has been a key element of Greek economic activity since ancient times.

=== Ferries ===
There are several Greece owned companies that operate passenger ferries.

Superfast Ferries has operated lines in several parts of Europe (in the Adriatic Sea, Aegean Sea, North Sea, and the Baltic Sea). Currently, they are active in the Adriatic Sea, operating between Greece and Italy. Their routes are between the Italian ports of Ancona and Bari and the Greek ports of Igoumenitsa and Patras, as well as between Bari and Corfu.

ANEK Lines operates passenger ferries, mainly on the Piraeus–Crete and Adriatic Sea routes. Blue Star Ferries provides ferry services between the Greek mainland and the Aegean Islands.

=== Waterways ===
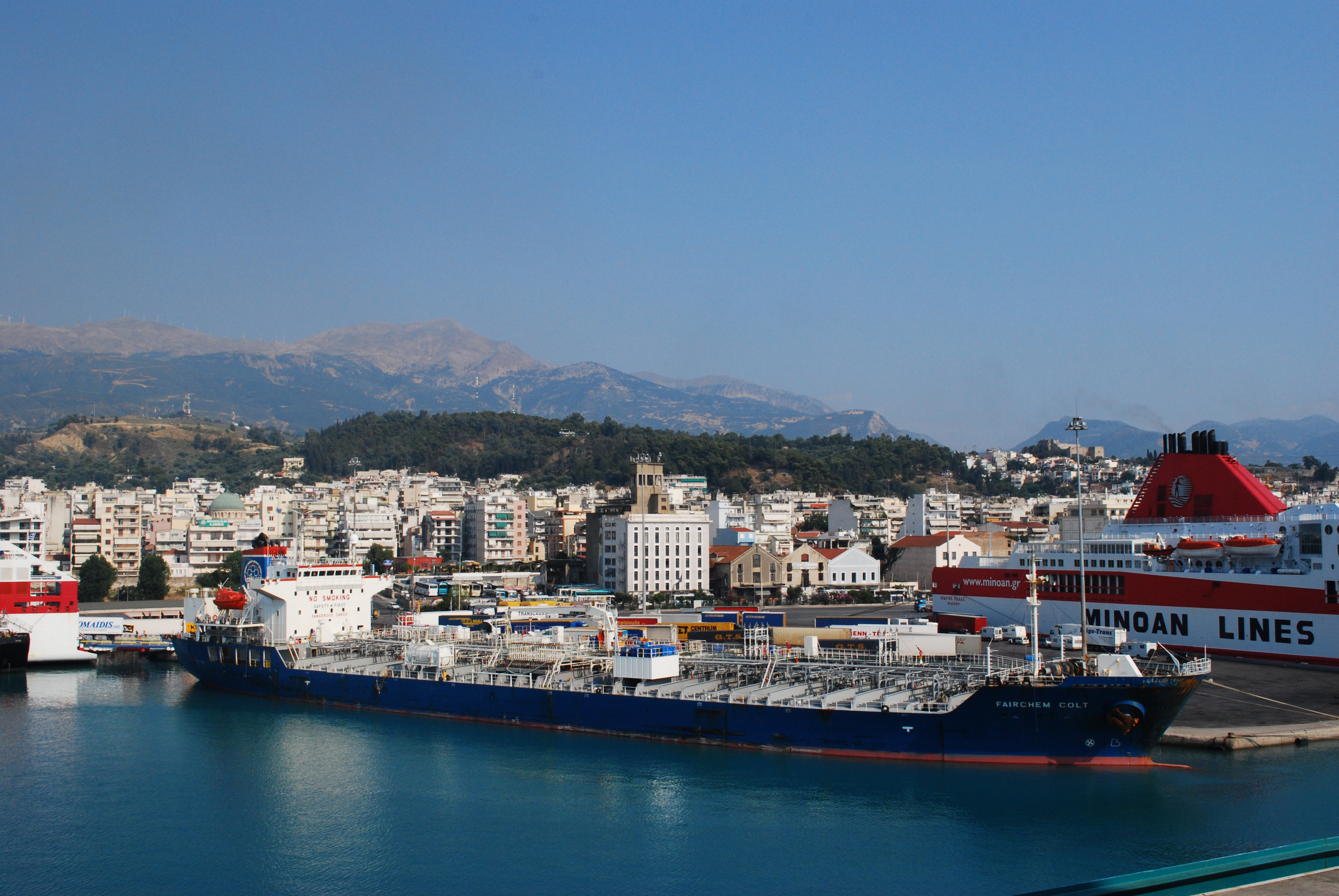
View of the port of Patras

The 80 km system consists of three coastal canals including the Corinth Canal (6 km) and three unconnected rivers.

The Corinth Canal crosses the Isthmus of Corinth, connecting the Gulf of Corinth with the Saronic Gulf; and shortens the sea voyage from the Adriatic to Athens port of Piraeus by 325 km.

=== Merchant marine ===
- total: 3,338 ships (with a volume of 1,000 gross tonnage (GT) or over) totaling 109,377,819 GT/182,540,868 tonnes deadweight (DWT)
- ships by type (1999 est.)

- bulk carrier: 273
- cargo ship: 60
- chemical tanker: 22
- combination bulk: 5
- combination ore/oil: 8
- container ship: 43
- Liquified Gas Carrier: 5
- multi-functional large load carrier: 1
- passenger ship: 12
- passenger/cargo: 2
- petroleum tanker: 245
- refrigerated cargo: 3
- roll-on/roll-off ship: 19
- short-sea passenger: 75
- specialized tanker: 4
- vehicle carrier: 2

== Air transport ==
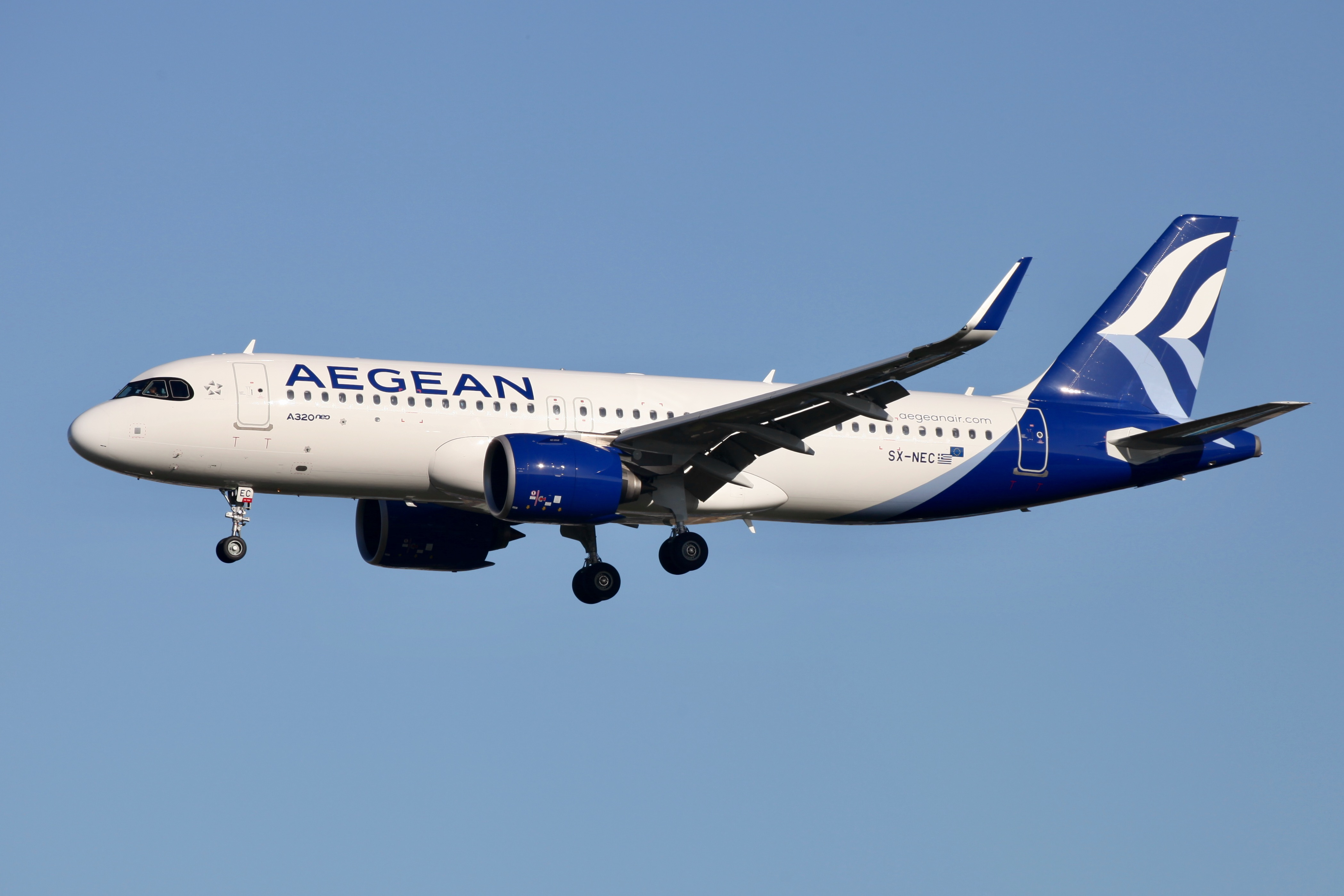
Aegean Airlines Airbus A320neo.

Greece counts 16 international, 11 military and 26 airports of mixed use. There are sixteen civil international airports; two biggest by passenger numbers are located in Athens and in Thessaloniki. As of 2025, Athens Airport is the 15th-busiest airport in Europe and the second busiest and second largest in the Balkans after Istanbul Airport.

Due to the Mediterranean climate, secondary are Heraklion/Crete, Rhodes and Corfu airports, which are key hubs for tourists, particularly during the busy summer season each year. The Greek subsidiary of Fraport manages 14 airports in Greece, including Thessaloniki, Rhodes and Santorini.

Aegean Airlines is the flag carrier of Greece and the largest Greek airline by total number of passengers carried, by number of destinations served, and by fleet size. A Star Alliance member since June 2010, it operates scheduled and charter services from Athens and Thessaloniki to other major Greek, European, Middle Eastern, African and Indian destinations. Other Greek airlines include: Olympic Air (a regional subsidiary of Aegean Airlines) and SKY Express.

== Miscellaneous ==
=== Pipelines ===
- crude oil: 26 km
- petroleum products: 547 km

=== Cable transport ===
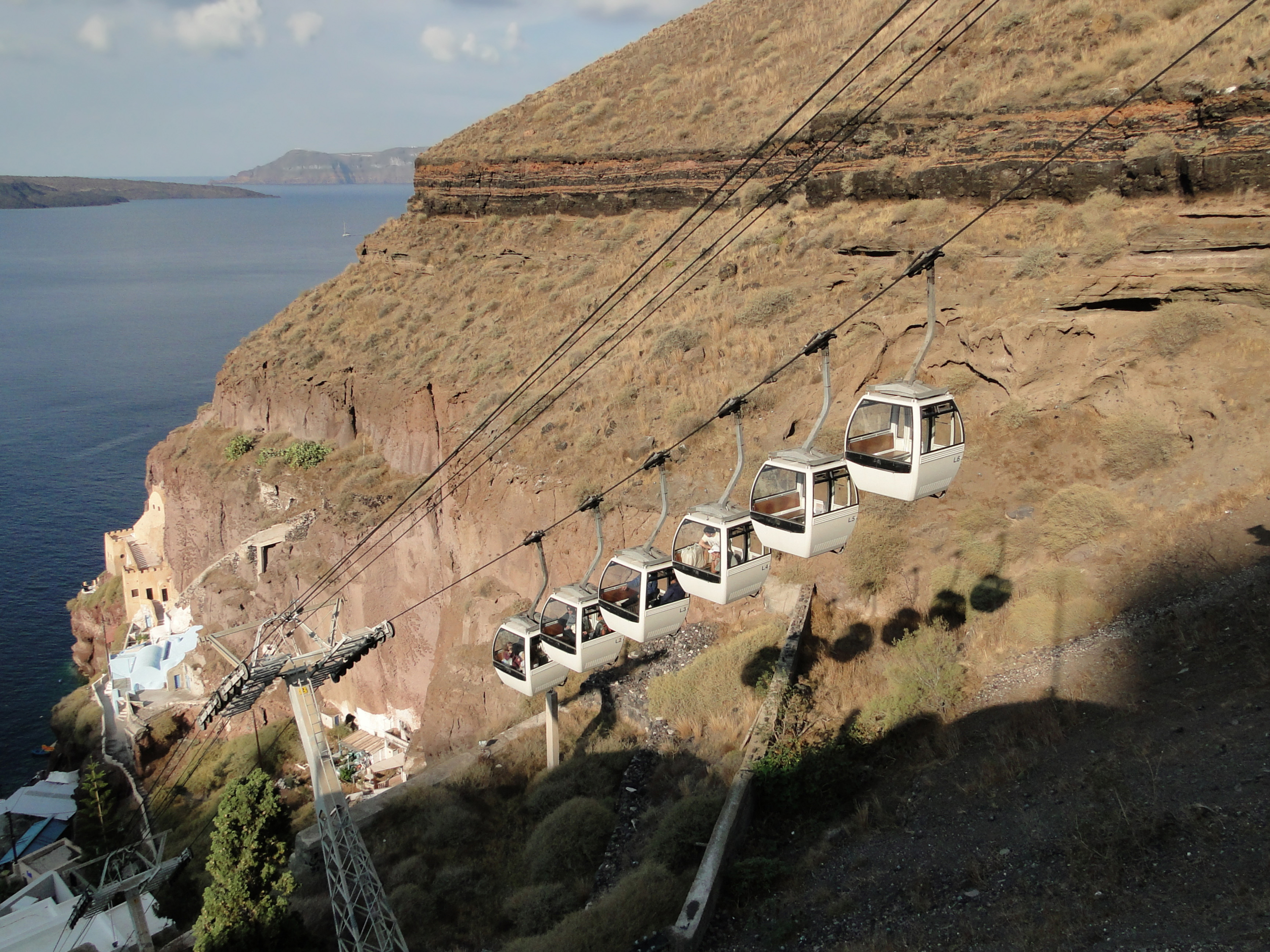
Cable car of Santorini

- Lycabettus Funicular
- Parnitha Funitel
- Santorini cable car

== Major construction projects ==
=== Completed projects ===
==== Motorways ====
- A1 motorway (PAThE): 550 km (340 mi)
- A11 motorway
- A2 motorway (Egnatia Odos): 670 km (420 mi)
- A24 motorway
- A25 motorway
- A27 motorway (partially complete)
- A29 motorway: 77 km (48 mi)
- A3 motorway (Central Greece Motorway, part of the E65, partially complete)
- A5 motorway (Ionia Odos, partially complete): 196 km (122 mi)
  - Rio–Antirrio bridge 2,880 metre long (9,449 ft) (2nd longest cable bridge in Europe
- A52 motorway
- A6 motorway (Attiki Odos): 69.7 km (43.3 mi)
- A62 motorway
- A621 motorway
- A64 motorway
- A7 motorway (Moreas Motorway): 205 km (127 mi)
- A71 motorway
- A8 motorway (Olympia Odos): 210 km (130 mi)
- A90 motorway (partially complete)

==== Railways ====
- Athens Airport–Patras railway (completed until Aigio)
- Thessaloniki–Alexandroupoli railway
- Athens Metro

- Line 1
- Line 2
- Line 3

- Athens Tram

==== Ports and harbours ====
Pireaus Port Rafina Port Lavrion Port

==== Airports ====
- Athens International Airport
- Thessaloniki Airport – "Makedonia"

=== Projects under construction ===
- North Road Axis of Crete
- Branches of Egnatia Odos
  - A27 motorway

==== Railways ====
- Construction and electrification of extension to Patras of Athens Airport–Patras railway
- Line 4 (Athens Metro)
- Thessaloniki Metro

==== Airports ====
- New Heraklion Airport in Kasteli

=== Future projects ===
==== Motorways ====
- Larisa–Kozane Motorway
- Eleusina-Oinofyta
- Attiki odos extension to Lavrio and Rafina

==== Railways ====
- Igoumenitsa–Ioannina–Kalampaka line
- Thessaloniki Metro extensions
- Athens metro line 5
- Kalampaka–Kastoria line
- Florina–Pogradec line
- Kalamaka–Kozani–Thessaloniki–Kavala–Toxotes line
- Ioannina–Rio line
- Thessaloniki–Chalkidiki line
- Thessaloniki–Giannitsa–Skydra line
- Chania–Rethymnon–Herakleion line
- Thessaloniki Tram
- Heraklion Tram
- Patras Tram
- Larisa Tram
- Ioannina Tram
- Volos Tram

== See also ==
- Rapid transit in Greece
