= Transport in Crete =

Transport in Crete has undergone significant changes in the past two decades, vastly modernizing the country's infrastructure. Although ferry transport between islands remains the prominent method of transport between the nations islands, improvements to the road infrastructure, rail, urban transport, and airports have all led to a vast improvement in transportation. These upgrades have played a key role in supporting Greece's economy, which in the past decade has come to rely heavily on the construction industry.

== Road transport ==
=== Bus transport ===
==== Intercity and regional bus transport ====
KTEL is the common name for every company which is responsible for intercity and regional bus transit. Each prefecture, though, has its own regional network of buses, but they are named as "KTEL".

== Water transport ==
=== Ports and harbours ===
- Heraklion, Crete

== Airports ==
- total: 6 (2005)
- With paved runways: 6

- over 3,047 m: 1
- 2,438 to 3,047 m: 3
- 1,524 to 2,437 m: 1
- 914 to 1,523 m: 1

under 914 m: 0 (2005)

- With unpaved runways: 0

- 914 to 1,523 m: 0
- under 914 m: 0 (2005)

- heliports: 0 (2005)

== See also ==
- Transport in Greece
