= Patras Bus Station =

Intercity bus station in Greece

General information
- Location: Patras; City Center; Greece
- System: Intercity bus service
- Owner: KTEL
- Bus routes: 20+

Construction
- Parking: No
- Accessible: Yes

History
- Opened: 1970s

Passengers
- 2017: 10 Million (approximately)
Location

Patras Bus Station also known as KTEL Achaias bus station, is the third largest Bus Station in Greece after Athens Kifissos Bus Station and Thessaloniki Macedonia Bus Station. The bus station opened in 1976 in the city center of Patras in the opposite side of the port. The bus station is close to Patras Railway Station. It is connected with Patras Bus Organisation which serves bus routes in the whole city. KTEL Achaias has a hub in the bus station. Due to its small terminal, other routes such as to Zakynthos, Kefalonia, Corfu, Trikala, Lefkada are served from other stations on Othonos Amalias Avenue. A new bus station is under construction in Agios Dionisios in Patras, 200 m (660 ft) away from the present station. It will open in early 2023.

== Destinations ==
Buses	Cities
KTEL Akhaias	Arta, Athens-Peloponnese, Ioannina, Igoumenitsa, Kalamata, Karditsa, Lamia, Larissa, Pyrgos, Thessaloniki; Winter Seasonal: Argos, Chalkida
KTEL Akhaias (regional Routes}	Araxos, Akrata, Arla, Aigeira, Aigio, Chalandritsa, Kato Achaia, Kato Mazaraki, Lakkomata, Metochi, Psathopyrgos, Riolos, Skiadas, Starochori, Varda
KTEL Artis	Arta
KTEL Aitoloakarnanias	Agrinio, Missolonghi, Nafpaktos
KTEL Ioannina	Ioannina
KTEL Ilias	Amaliada, Gastouni, Katakolo, Pyrgos
KTEL Trikalon	Trikala
KTEL Evias	Winter Seasonal: Chalkida
KTEL Kefalonnias	Argostoli
KTEL Korinthias	Corinth, Xilokastro
KTEL Messinias	Kalamata
KTEL Zakynthou	Zakynthos (via Kyllini)
KTEL Lefkadas	Lefkas
KTEL Kerkyras	Corfu
KTEL Fthiotidos	Lamia
KTEL Fokidos	Amfissa, Galaxidi
