= Thessaloniki Airport =

International airport serving Thessaloniki, Greece

Thessaloniki Airport "Makedonia"

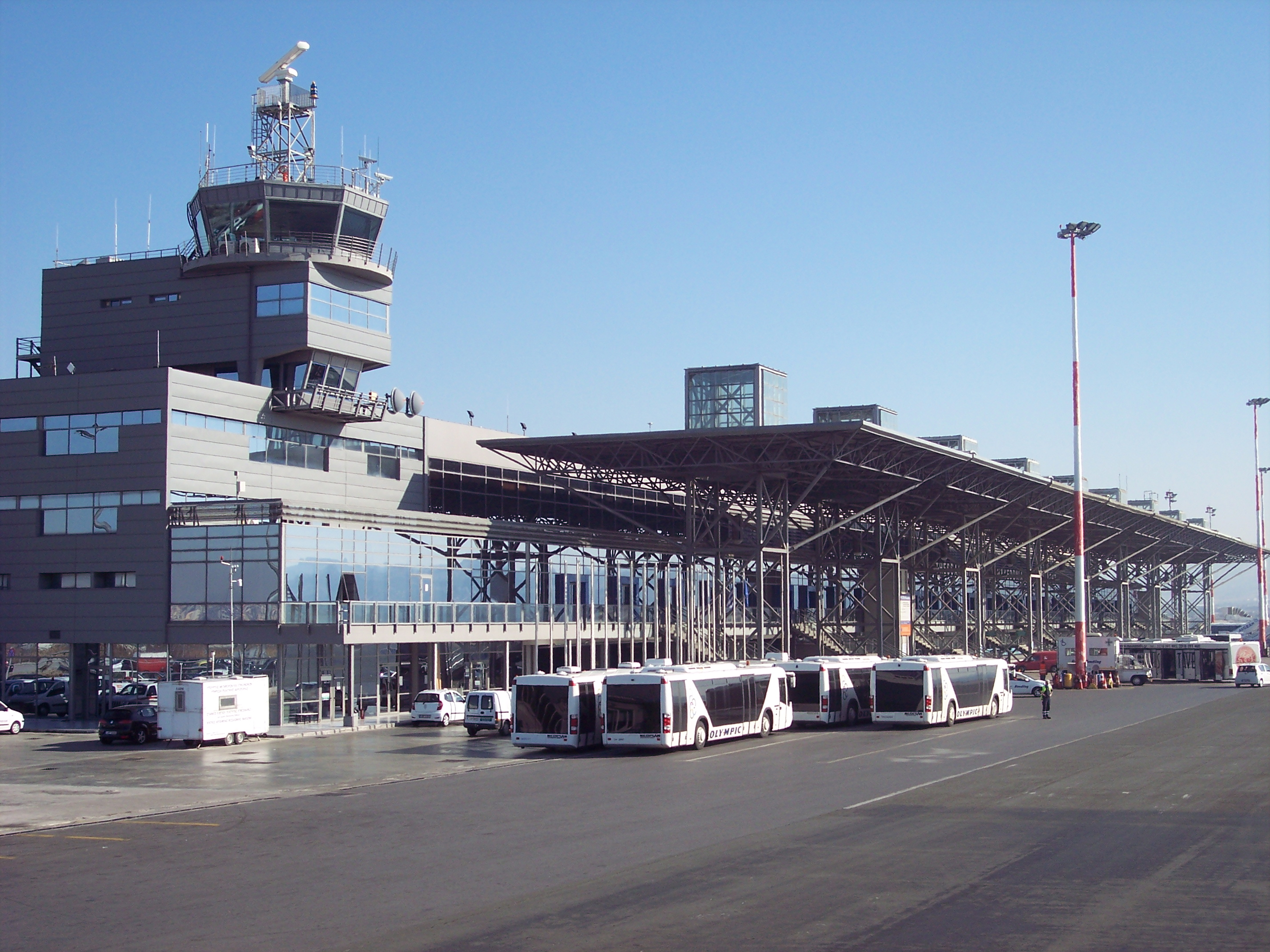
- Terminal 1 (T1)
- IATA: SKG; ICAO: LGTS

Summary
- Airport type: Public / Military
- Owner: Government of Greece
- Operator: Fraport Greece
- Serves: Thessaloniki
- Location: Thermi, Greece
- Opened: 1948 (for public)
- Hub for: Aegean Airlines; Olympic Air; Sky Express
- Operating base for: Ryanair
- Time zone: Eastern European Time (UTC+02:00)
  - Summer (DST): Eastern European Summer Time (UTC+03:00)
- Elevation AMSL: 6.83 m (22.4 ft)
- Coordinates: 40°31′11″N 22°58′15.3″E
- Website: www.skg-airport.gr/en/

Maps
- Map of the airport

- Location of the airport in Greece

Runways
Direction	Length		Surface
Direction	m	ft	Surface
10/28	3,440	11,286	Asphalt
16/34	2,424	7,953	Asphalt

Statistics (2025)
- Passengers: 7,982,798
- Passenger traffic change: ▲8.2%
- Aircraft movements: 61,141
- Aircraft movements change: ▲7.1%
- Sources: Greek AIP; Statistics: Fraport Greece

Thessaloniki Airport (IATA: SKG, ICAO: LGTS), officially Thessaloniki Airport "Makedonia" (Greek: Κρατικός Αερολιμένας Θεσσαλονίκης «Μακεδονία», romanized: Kratikós Aeroliménas Thessaloníkis "Makedonía") and formerly Mikra Airport, is an international airport serving Thessaloniki, the second-largest city in Greece. It is located 13 km (8 mi) southeast of the city, in Thermi.

The airport is the third-largest airport in the country after Athens International Airport and Heraklion International Airport. It opened in 1930 and was the second-busiest airport in Greece in terms of flights served and the third-busiest in terms of passengers served in 2016, with over 6 million passengers. It is the main airport of Northern Greece and apart from the city of Thessaloniki it also serves the popular tourist destination of Chalkidiki and the surrounding cities of Macedonia. The Athens–Thessaloniki route is the tenth busiest in the EU with 1.8 million passengers. To cope with demand, a second terminal was constructed in conjunction with Fraport and formally opened in 2021.

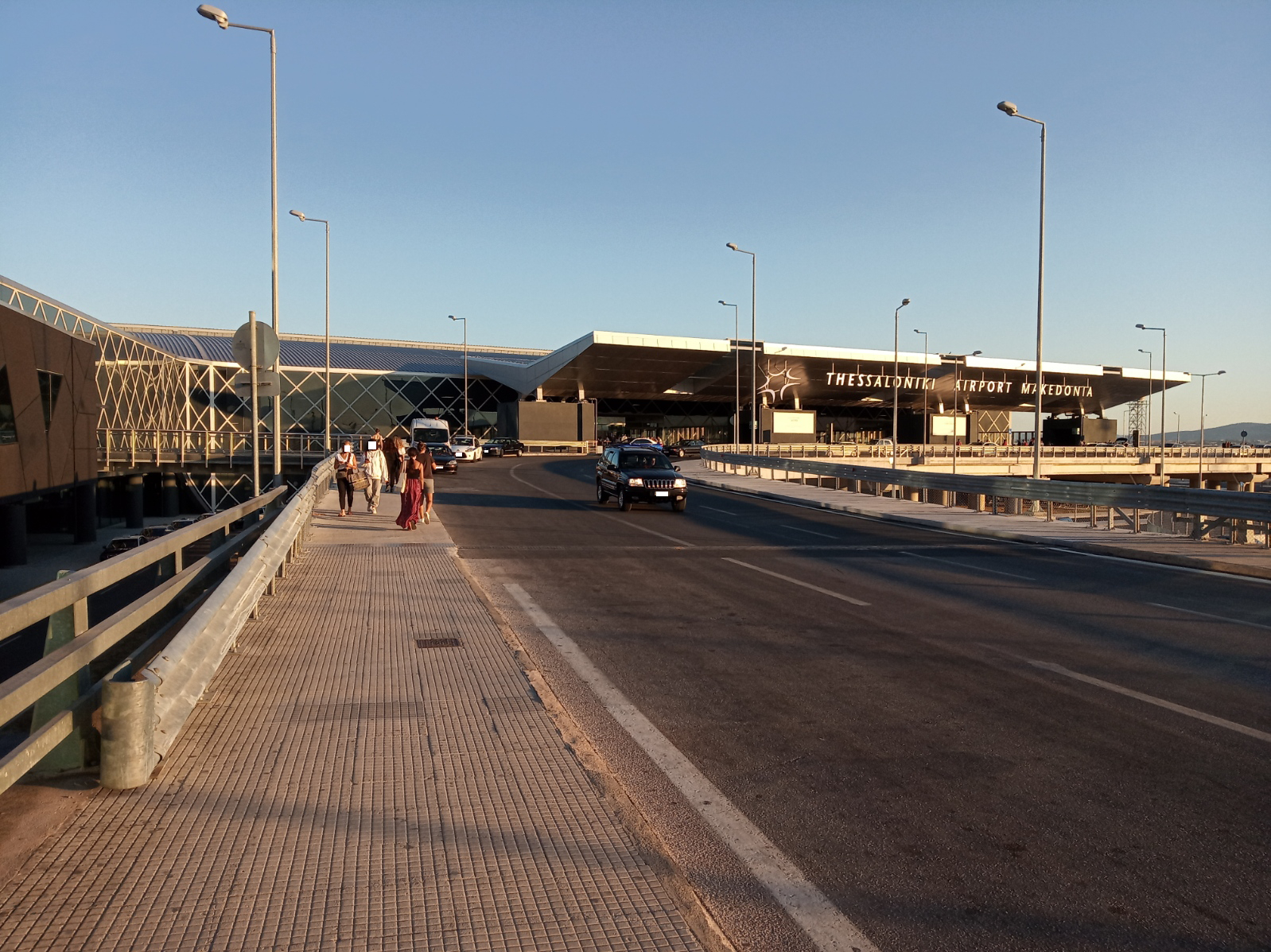
New Terminal (T2)

== History ==
The airport was first established as an airfield during the First World War, as part of the allied war effort on the Macedonian front. There were numerous airfields at the time, including Little Mikra, Big Mikra (which became the current international airport), and the major military airfield of Sedes. The first international flight to Thessaloniki landed at the Little Mikra air field, and government efforts at encouraging the growth of civil aviation saw the start of construction of a purpose-built civilian airport at the present location in 1938. Works were temporarily abandoned due to the Second World War and the airport opened to civilian traffic in 1948.

Major works were undertaken after the war. The accession of Greece to North Atlantic Treaty Organisation saw NATO-funded investments such as the expansion of the 10/28 runway to 2,440 metres (8,010 ft) and the inauguration of a new terminal building in 1965. Damage to the tower caused by the 1978 Thessaloniki earthquake meant it needed to be torn down, and a new tower, still in operation, was built. Modernisation works were undertaken in the late 1990s, as part of the celebrations for Thessaloniki being European Capital of Culture in 1997. In 1993 the airport took the name Makedonia (Greek: Μακεδονία, Macedonia).

The operational aspects of the airport were privatised in 2015. Fraport AG/Copelouzos Group joint venture and the state privatisation fund agreed to the privatisation of the airport operations, and 13 other Greek airports, in December 2015. Fraport Greece will operate the airport for 40 years starting on 11 April 2017. It pledged to invest €400 million ($451.88 million) on the various airports, including a refurbishment of the existing facilities at Thessaloniki as well as the construction of a second terminal. Construction on the new terminal began on 19 September 2018 and finished in February 2021, three months ahead of schedule. Refurbishment works other than the terminal included the installation of an upgraded baggage handling system, the construction of three additional baggage reclaim belts, the connection of the wastewater treatment plant to the municipal service, the construction of a new airport fire station, and the construction of two new access control gatehouses to the previously unguarded apron. Fraport expects passenger traffic to increase by 48% by 2026 as a result of its investment.

== Facilities ==
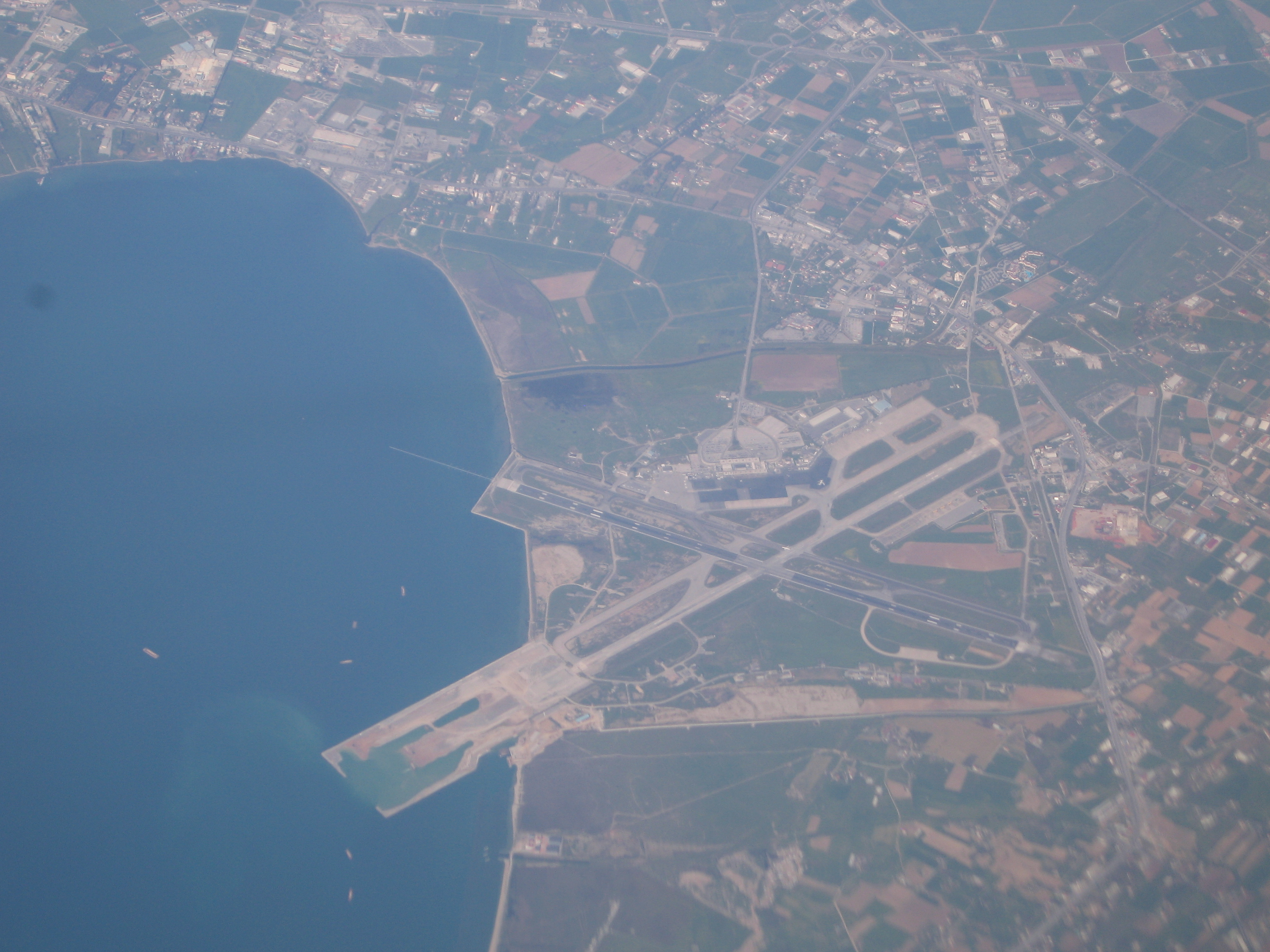
Aerial view of the airport in 2011, showing the progress of construction of the runway expansion

=== General ===
The airport consists of two terminals arranged in a T-shape, with the main access road on one side and the tarmac on the other, while the control tower is located in the junction between the two terminals. Four parking lots are located directly in front of the Terminal 1 building: the P4 lot is reserved for short term (visitor) parking and lots P6, P7, and P8 are used for long term (traveler) parking. P5, located on the left of the T1 building, serves taxi cabs and tourist buses.

=== Terminals ===
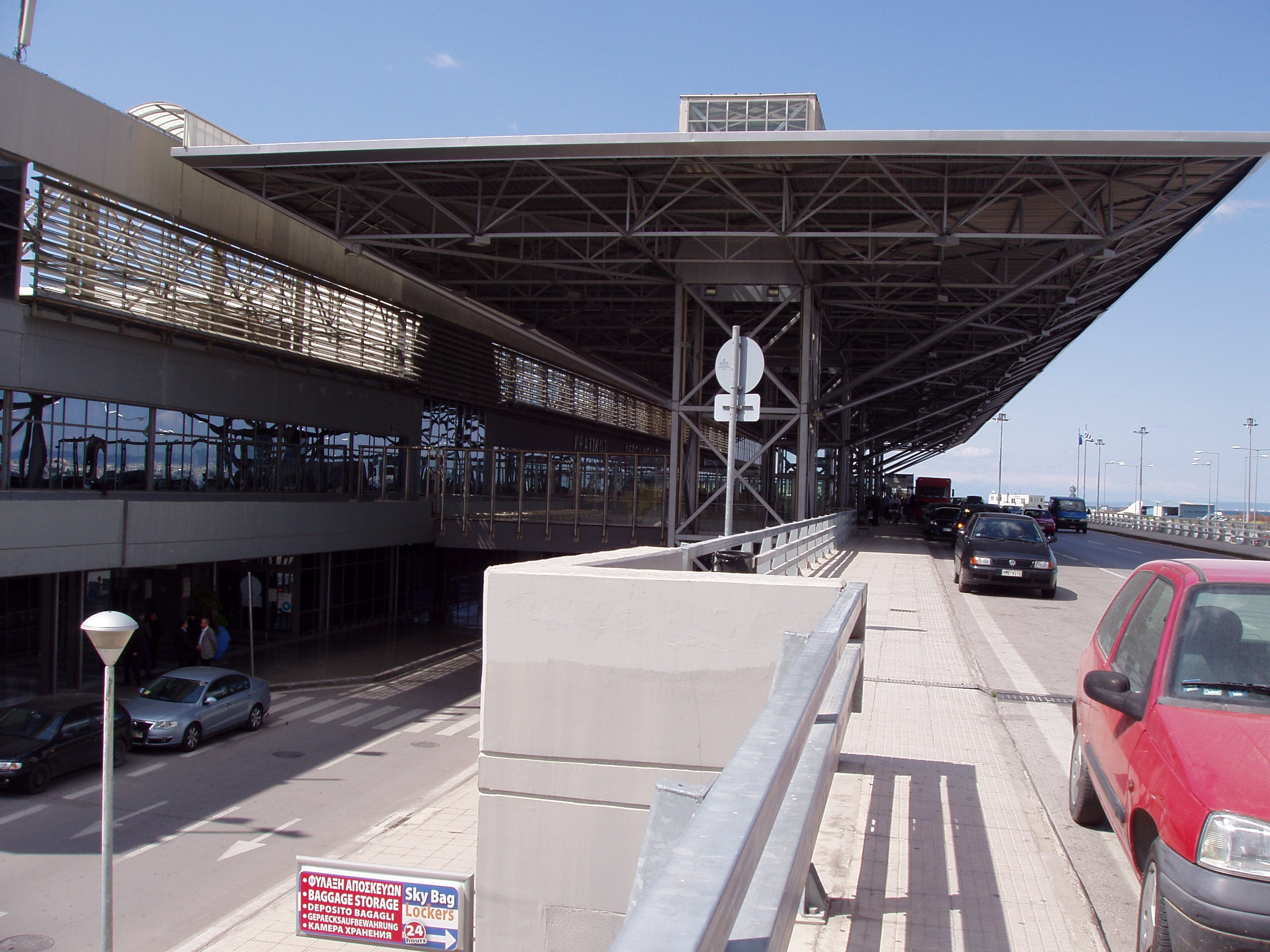
The airport's original terminal (T1)

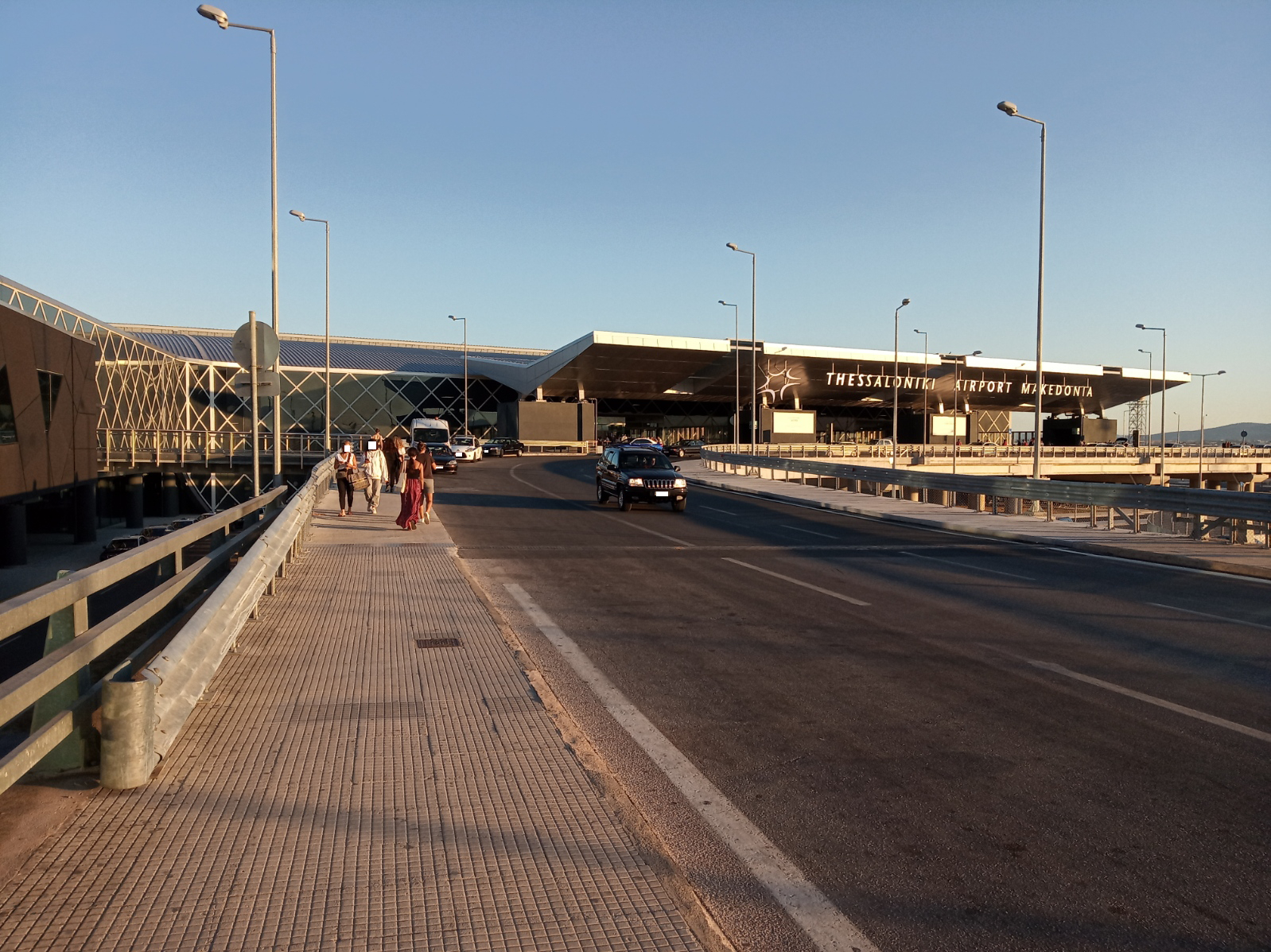
The new additional terminal (T2)

The airport's original terminal (T1) consists of three floors. The ground floor serves arrivals only and is divided into two sections: international/extra-Schengen arrivals and domestic/intra-Schengen arrivals. The second floor serves departures and also includes a shopping center. On this floor there are 16 check-in counters, waiting areas, bars, stores and various airlines' offices. The third floor houses two restaurants and several bars with views to the runways, as well as two passenger lounges. T1 houses twelve departure gates (numbered 13-24) : gates 13 and 14 are for domestic or intra-Schengen flights, gates 15-18 are used interchangeably for either domestic, intra-Schengen or extra-Schengen flights, and gates 19-24 are reserved exclusively for extra-Schengen international flights.

An additional terminal (T2) was opened in the beginning of 2021. It includes an additional 28 check in counters (bringing the airport total to 44), and twelve departure gates (numbered 01-12) for international (intra-Schengen) and domestic flights. This terminal also includes several additional duty-free shops, traditional souvenir and jewelry shops, and auxiliary airline offices.

In both terminals, passengers can use the "Fraport-free" free Wi-Fi and public mobile phone charging ports, as well as luggage carrying trolleys, and receive information from two National Tourism Organization offices. There are also ATMs, postal service and car rental offices in the departure sections of both terminals.

=== Runways and apron ===
The airport has two runways (10/28 and 16/34) and two taxiways. There are 22 stands for narrow-body aircraft and 20 for light aircraft.

A modernisation and expansion project for runway 10/28 began in 2005, with an initial completion date of 2011, but has since been delayed and was finally completed in March 2019. The runway entered service on 11 September 2020. Overall, the project took almost a quarter century to build, from inception in 1997, and it had an estimated cost of €179 million ($202 million). The runway was extended by 1,000 metres (3,280 ft) into the sea, with a total length of 3,440 metres (11,290 ft) and was equipped with ILS. When the runway opened for commercial use it was able to accommodate 89.6% of current commercial aircraft types, as opposed to just 22.6% before the extension, and improved safety while landing in bad weather conditions and low visibility.

=== Fire station ===
The airport is served by Thessaloniki Fire Station No 5, whose facility is located in the junction between runways 10/28 and 16/34.

=== Other facilities ===
The Thessaloniki AeroClub recreational flying club maintains a hangar next to the T2 building which is used by its more experienced pilots (the club's actual hangar facilities are on the Kolchiko airport). The Aeolus Aviation Academy also operates on the airport.

== Airlines and destinations ==
The following airlines operate regular scheduled and charter flights at Thessaloniki Airport:

Airlines	Destinations
Aegean Airlines	Athens, Barcelona, Berlin, Brussels, Cairo, Chania, Düsseldorf, Frankfurt, Heraklion, Istanbul, Kalamata, Kos, Larnaca, Milan–Malpensa, Munich, Mytilene, Prague, Rhodes, Rome–Fiumicino, Stuttgart, Tel Aviv, Zürich; Seasonal: Cologne/Bonn, Dubrovnik, Hamburg, Hanover, İzmir, Milos, Mykonos, Naxos, Nuremberg, Paris–Charles de Gaulle, Paros, Santorini, Syros Tbilisi, Venice, Yerevan, Zakynthos
Air Serbia	Belgrade; Seasonal: Kraljevo
airBaltic	Seasonal: Riga
airHaifa	Haifa
Animawings	Seasonal: Bucharest–Otopeni, Cluj-Napoca, Iași, Timișoara
Arkia	Tel Aviv
Austrian Airlines	Vienna
British Airways	Seasonal: London–City, London–Gatwick, London–Heathrow
easyJet	Berlin, London–Gatwick; Seasonal: Amsterdam, Basel/Mulhouse, Bristol, London–Luton (begins 1 May 2027), Manchester, Milan–Malpensa
Enter Air	Seasonal charter: Gdańsk, Poznań, Warsaw–Chopin
Eurowings	Cologne/Bonn, Düsseldorf, Hamburg, Stuttgart
Finnair	Seasonal: Helsinki
FlyOne	Seasonal: Yerevan
Israir	Tel Aviv
Jet2.com	Seasonal: Birmingham, Bristol, East Midlands, Edinburgh, Leeds/Bradford, London–Gatwick, London–Stansted, Manchester, Newcastle upon Tyne
LOT Polish Airlines	Warsaw–Chopin
Lufthansa	Frankfurt, Munich
Luxair	Seasonal: Luxembourg
Norwegian Air Shuttle	Seasonal: Oslo
Olympic Air	Chios, Ikaria, Lemnos, Samos
Royal Jordanian	Amman–Queen Alia
Ryanair	Beauvais, Bergamo, Bratislava, Bucharest–Otopeni, Budapest, Charleroi, Karlsruhe/Baden-Baden, Kraków, London–Stansted, Malta, Memmingen, Nuremberg, Paphos, Rome–Fiumicino, Vienna; Seasonal: Bologna, Chania, Copenhagen, Corfu, Dublin, Eindhoven, Helsinki, Naples, Warsaw–Modlin
Scandinavian Airlines	Stockholm–Arlanda; Seasonal: Copenhagen
SkyAlps	Seasonal: Bolzano
Sky Express	Athens, Chania, Chios, Düsseldorf, Heraklion, Larnaca, Mytilene, Rhodes, Samos, Skyros; Seasonal: Mykonos, Paros
SkyUp Airlines	Chișinău
Smartwings	Seasonal: Prague; Seasonal charter: Katowice, Poznan Vienna
Sundor	Seasonal: Tel Aviv
Swiss International Air Lines	Zürich; Seasonal: Geneva
TAROM	Seasonal: Bucharest–Otopeni
Transavia	Amsterdam, Paris–Orly; Seasonal: Brussels (resumes 28 June 2027)
TUI Airways	Seasonal: Birmingham, Bristol, London–Gatwick, Manchester
Turkish Airlines	Istanbul
TUS Airways	Seasonal: Tel Aviv
Wizz Air	Budapest, Kutaisi, Larnaca, Tel Aviv

== Statistics ==
=== Overview ===
Between 1994 and 2010, Thessaloniki Airport saw a rise in passenger traffic equal to 76%, from 2.2 million in 1994 to 3.9 million in 2010. Between 2003 and 2008 the airport saw a passenger traffic increase of 19.1% from 3.5 million to almost 4.2 million passengers, an all-time high. The number of passengers dropped in next years. However, over the last two years the airport experienced passenger traffic increase to just above four million by 2013. Significant traffic increase took place during 2014, with the total number of passengers exceeding the five million mark for the first time.

=== Annual statistics ===
Passenger, aircraft movement at "Makedonia" airport: 1994–2025
Year	Passenger traffic	Passenger % change	Aircraft movements	Aircraft % change
1994	2,227,487	n/a	29,990	n/a
1995	2,336,219	4.8 ▲	30,827	2.7 ▲
1996	2,499,892	7 ▲	33,850	9.8 ▲
1997	2,797,166	11.8 ▲	39,766	17.4 ▲
1998	2,667,075	4.6 ▼	39,473	0.7 ▼
1999	3,186,721	19.4 ▲	47,589	20.6 ▲
2000	3,548,027	11.3 ▲	49,007	3.0 ▲
2001	3,430,819	3.3 ▼	42,982	12.3 ▼
2002	3,257,436	5 ▼	39,550	8.0 ▼
2003	3,500,922	7.4 ▲	48,310	22.1 ▲
2004	3,620,909	3.4 ▲	50,608	4.8 ▲
2005	3,670,581	3.6 ▲	47,186	5.7 ▼
2006	3,802,854	5.6 ▲	47,380	0.4 ▲
2007	4,167,969	9.7 ▲	50,244	6.1 ▲
2008	4,169,559	0.4 ▲	47,882	4.7 ▼
2009	4,104,195	1.5 ▼	50,238	4.9 ▲
2010	3,910,751	4.7 ▼	44,938	10.5 ▼
2011	3,958,475	1.2 ▲	43,430	3.3 ▼
2012	4,006,204	1.2 ▲	43,006	0.9 ▼
2013	4,039,576	0.8 ▲	39,500	8.6 ▼
2014	4,950,726	22.5 ▲	45,900	16.2 ▲
2015	5,341,293	7.8 ▲	47,340	3.1 ▲
2016	5,735,581	7.3 ▲	48,710	2.8 ▲
2017	6,247,514	8.9 ▲	54,931	12.7 ▲
2018	6,689,193	7 ▲	55,307	0.6 ▲
2019	6,897,057	3,1 ▲	55,738	0.9 ▲
2020	2,317,336	66.4 ▼	24,966	55.2 ▼
2021	3,449,658	48.9 ▲	37,224	49.1 ▲
2022	5,923,175	71.7 ▲	49,019	31.7 ▲
2023	7,029,957	18.7 ▲	54,658	11.5 ▲
2024	7,381,064	5.0 ▲	57,080	4.4 ▲
2025	7,982,798	8.2 ▲	61,141	7.1 ▲

=== Busiest passenger routes by country ===
The table below shows passenger totals at Thessaloniki International Airport by country destination during 2025.

Passenger traffic by destination country (2025)
Rank	Country destination	Passengers
1	Greece	2,546,096
2	Germany	1,726,357
3	United Kingdom	494,246
4	Cyprus	482,867
5	Italy	362,800
6	Poland	263,047
7	Austria	221,614
8	Netherlands	183,818
9	Turkey	180,575
10	Israel	173,348

== Transport ==
The airport is directly connected with the city's major road arteries in the southeast, the EO16 and the A25 motorway, which connects Thessaloniki with Chalkidiki, via the ΕΟ67. The Thessaloniki Inner Ring Road provides access to the A1 (E75) and the A2 (E90) motorways. A total of 2,285 parking spaces for cars exist at the front of the terminal building. A car rental service is available at the terminal building. In addition, taxi services are available outside the airport terminal building 24 hours a day.

=== Public transport ===
There are plans to connect the airport with the Thessaloniki Metro. Elliniko Metro, the company overseeing the project, has published a map of proposed extensions, and it includes an overground extension of Line 2 towards the airport. This extension is not an immediate concern for the company, however, since the terminus of Line 2, Mikra, will be connected with the airport by a 10-minute shuttle bus. Detailed planning of the metro extension toward the airport was initiated in March 2019. For now, the airport is connected with the Line 1 of the system at Nea Elvetia with a shuttle bus, with the number 02X.

In the meantime, the airport is served on a 24-hour basis by bus 01X/01N of the Thessaloniki Urban Transport Organization (OASTH), which provides bus services between the Thessaloniki Bus Station (KTEL) and Makedonia airport arrivals/departures.

== Accidents and incidents ==
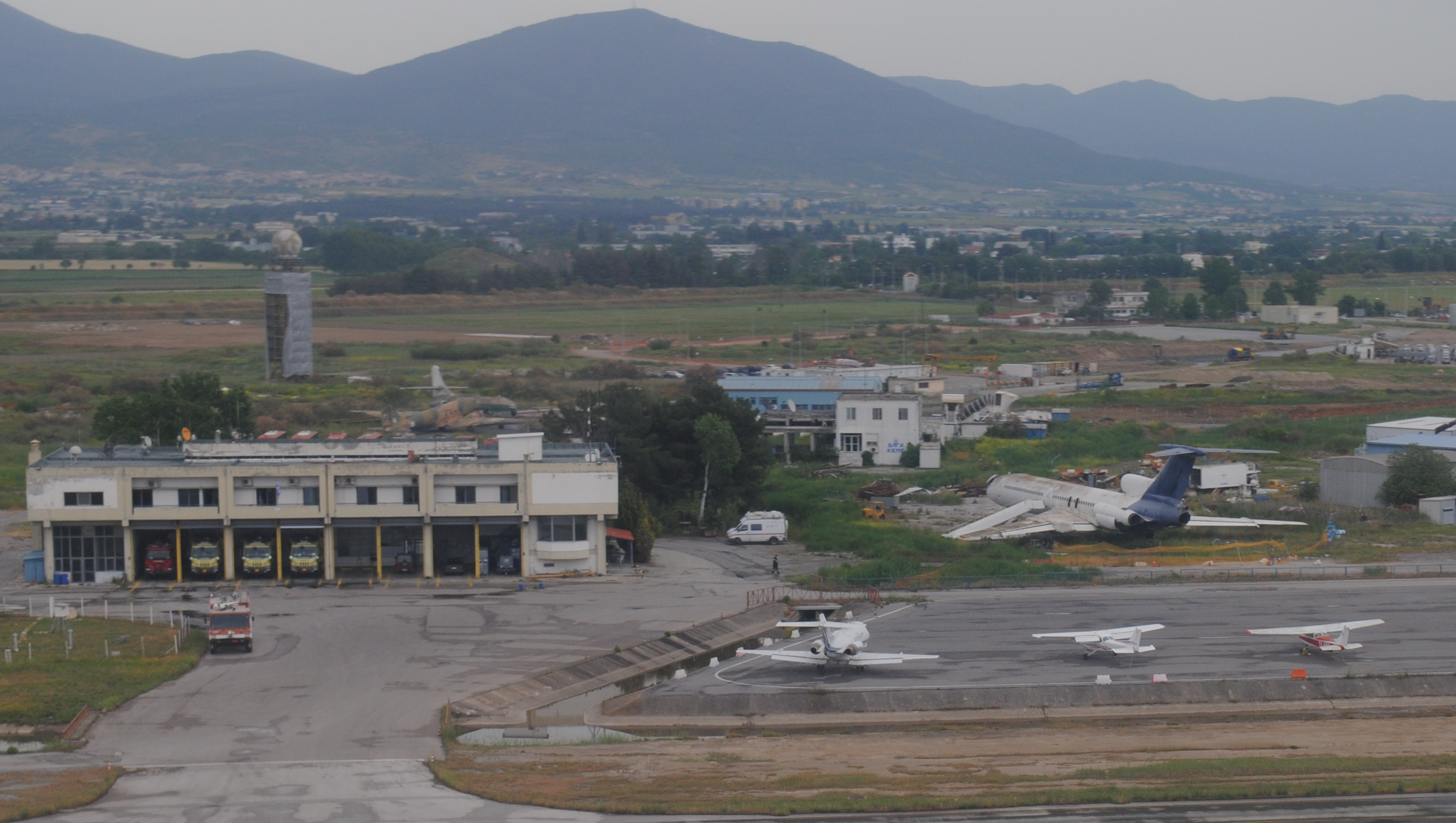
HA-LCR next to the airport fire station, in April 2018

- On 31 August 1995, a Mali Air Force Antonov An-26 after an attempted go-around crashed into a mountain 2.5 miles from SKG during an ILS approach to the airport in poor weather. All 6 occupants were killed.
- On 12 August 1997, Olympic Airways Flight 171, a Boeing 727-230 registered as SX-CBI inbound from Athens Ellinikon Airport, touched down late and was steered off the runway to avoid overrunning into the sea. None of the 35 passengers and crew were killed, but the aircraft was damaged beyond repair.
- On 17 December 1997, Aerosvit Flight 241, a Yakovlev Yak-42, operating the route from Odesa, Ukraine, to Thessaloniki, lost contact with the airport's air traffic control and during the second attempt the aircraft crashed in the Pierian Mountains, near Mount Olympus. A total of 70 people, passengers and crew, 41 of which were Greeks, were killed.
- On 4 July 2000, HA-LCR, a chartered Malév Flight 262 Tupolev Tu-154 landed on its belly. The crew had forgotten to lower the undercarriage and the plane skidded 400 m (1,300 ft) on the runway. Thanks to the plane's robust construction and the engines' high position, the plane was able to become airborne again as the pilots applied full throttle. It circled while the crew lowered the undercarriage and landed safely. There were no injuries. It was considered uneconomical to repair the aircraft. The aircraft remained on site until it was scrapped at the end of 2018; the airline markings were obscured and it was heavily depleted of re-usable spares over the years.

== See also ==
- List of the busiest airports in Greece
- Transport in Greece
- Alexander the Great Airport
