= Samos International Airport =

Samos International Airport "Aristarchos of Samos" Κρατικός Αερολιμένας Σάμου "Αρίσταρχος ο Σάμιος»

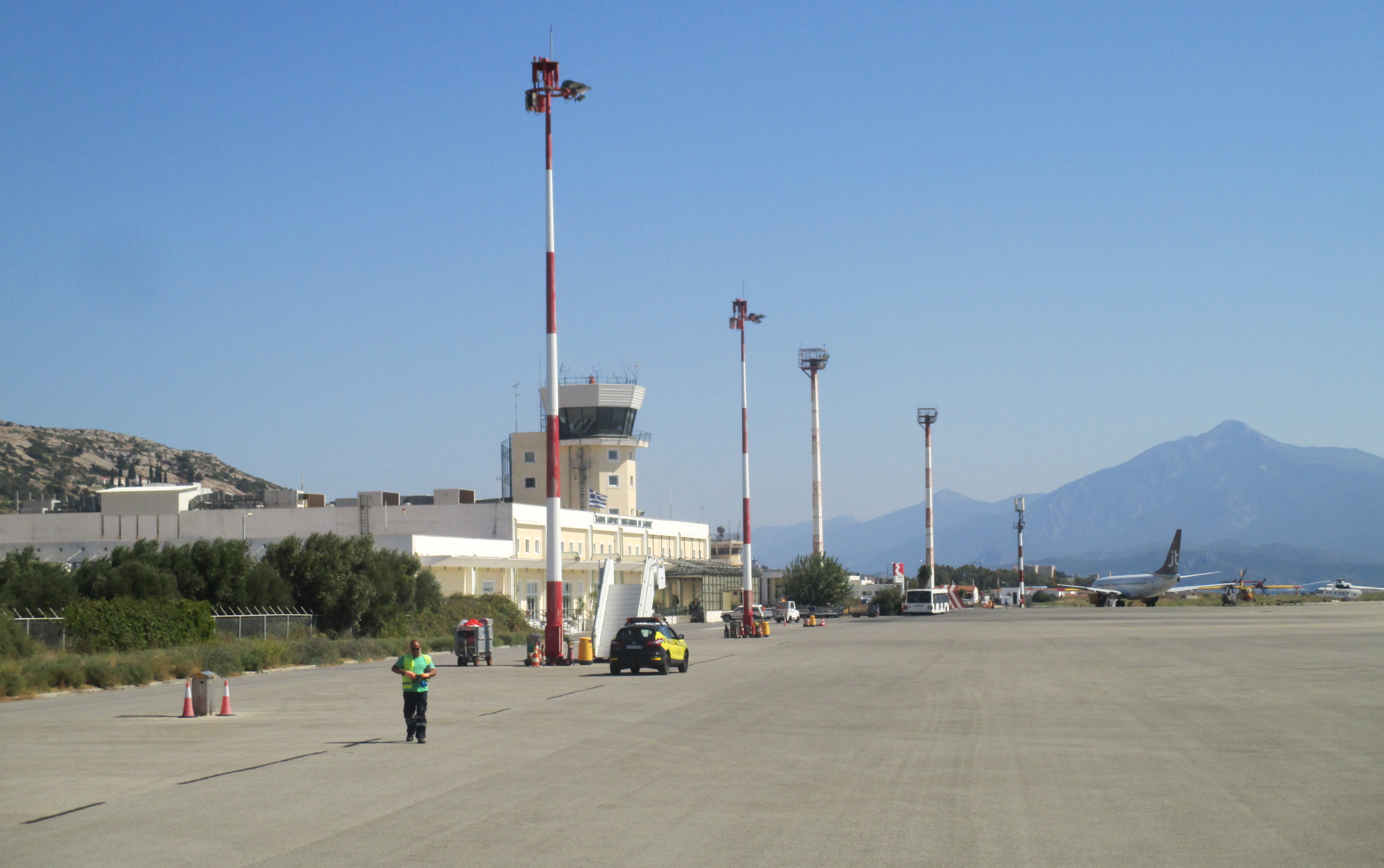
- IATA: SMI; ICAO: LGSM; WMO: 16723

Summary
- Airport type: Public
- Owner/Operator: Fraport AG/Copelouzos Group joint venture
- Serves: Vathy
- Location: Samos Island, Greece
- Elevation AMSL: 19 ft (5.8 m)
- Coordinates: 37°41′24″N 026°54′42″E
- Website: smi-airport.gr

Map
- Location of airport in Greece

Runways
Direction	Length		Surface
Direction	ft	m	Surface
09/27	6,890	2,100	Asphalt

Statistics (2022)
- Passengers: 453,264
- Passenger traffic change: ▲67.7%
- Aircraft movements: 5,700
- Aircraft movements change: ▲23.2%
- Sources:HCAA, Fraport Greece

Samos International Airport "Aristarchos of Samos" (IATA: SMI, ICAO: LGSM) is an airport on Samos Island, Greece.

The airport is named after Aristarchos of Samos, an ancient astronomer and mathematician, and lies within 5 km (3.1 mi) from the nearby town of Pythagorio. The airport has a single short runway. The airport's surroundings leave little room for error or mistake on the behalf of the pilots – with nearby mountains and sea at the end of the short runway. In summer there are often strong Meltemi winds from the north, which further contribute to the difficulty of the landing.

There is one terminal building. There are six boarding gates, none of which have jet-bridges. Passenger facilities are split across two floors and include a duty-free shop and a small café.

== History ==
The airport first operated in May 1976. In the late 1990s/early 2000s, the terminal was renovated: the capacity of the airport was increased to deal with increasing passenger numbers.

In December 2015, the privatisation of Samos International Airport and 13 other regional airports of Greece was finalised with the signing of the agreement between the Fraport AG/Copelouzos Group joint venture and the state privatisation fund. "We signed the deal today," the head of Greece's privatisation agency HRADF, Stergios Pitsiorlas, told Reuters. According to the agreement, the joint venture will operate the 14 airports (including Samos International Airport) for 40 years as of 11 April 2017.

== Future investment ==
On 22 March 2017, Fraport Greece presented its master plan for the 14 regional airports including the International Airport of Samos.

The following summarizes the enhancement changes that will be started in October 2017 and will be implemented for Samos International Airport under Fraport Greece's investment plan until 2021:

- General clean-up
- Improving lighting, marking of airside areas.
- Upgrading sanitary facilities
- Enhancing services and offering a new free Internet connection (WiFi)
- Implementing works to improve fire safety in all the areas of the airport
- Expanding and remodeling the current terminal
- New fire station
- Reorganizing the airport apron area
- 19 percent increase in the total size of the terminal at 9,605 m^{2}
- 40 percent increase in the number of check-in counters (from 10 to 14)
- 25 percent increase in the number of departure gates (from 4 to 5)
- 50 percent increase in the number of security lanes (from 2 to 3)

In January 2021, Fraport Greece concluded the last of the construction works for the 14 airports – well ahead of the April 2021 contractual deadline.

On 9 October 2024, Fraport Greece announced it would proceed with the third phase of runway construction at nine regional airports in Greece, including the International Airport of Samos. For the construction Samos Airport was to be closed from 5 November 2024 to 25 November 2024.

On 21 July 2025, Fraport Greece announced it would proceed with the forth phase of runway construction at eight regional airports in Greece, including the International Airport of Samos. For the construction Samos Airport is scheduled to be closed for 24hrs every Wednesday, 00:01 - 23:59 (local time), from 18 November 2025 to 24 March 2026, with 23, 24 and 31 December 2025, as well as 6 and 7 January 2026, being exempted.

== Airlines and destinations ==
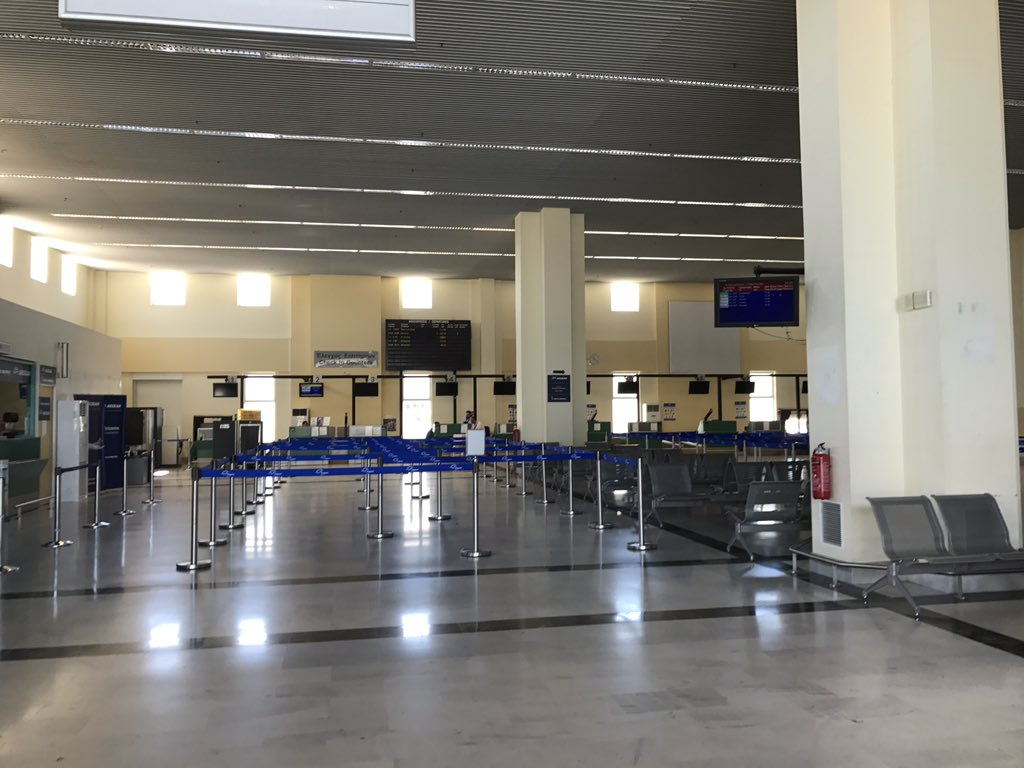
Check-in hall

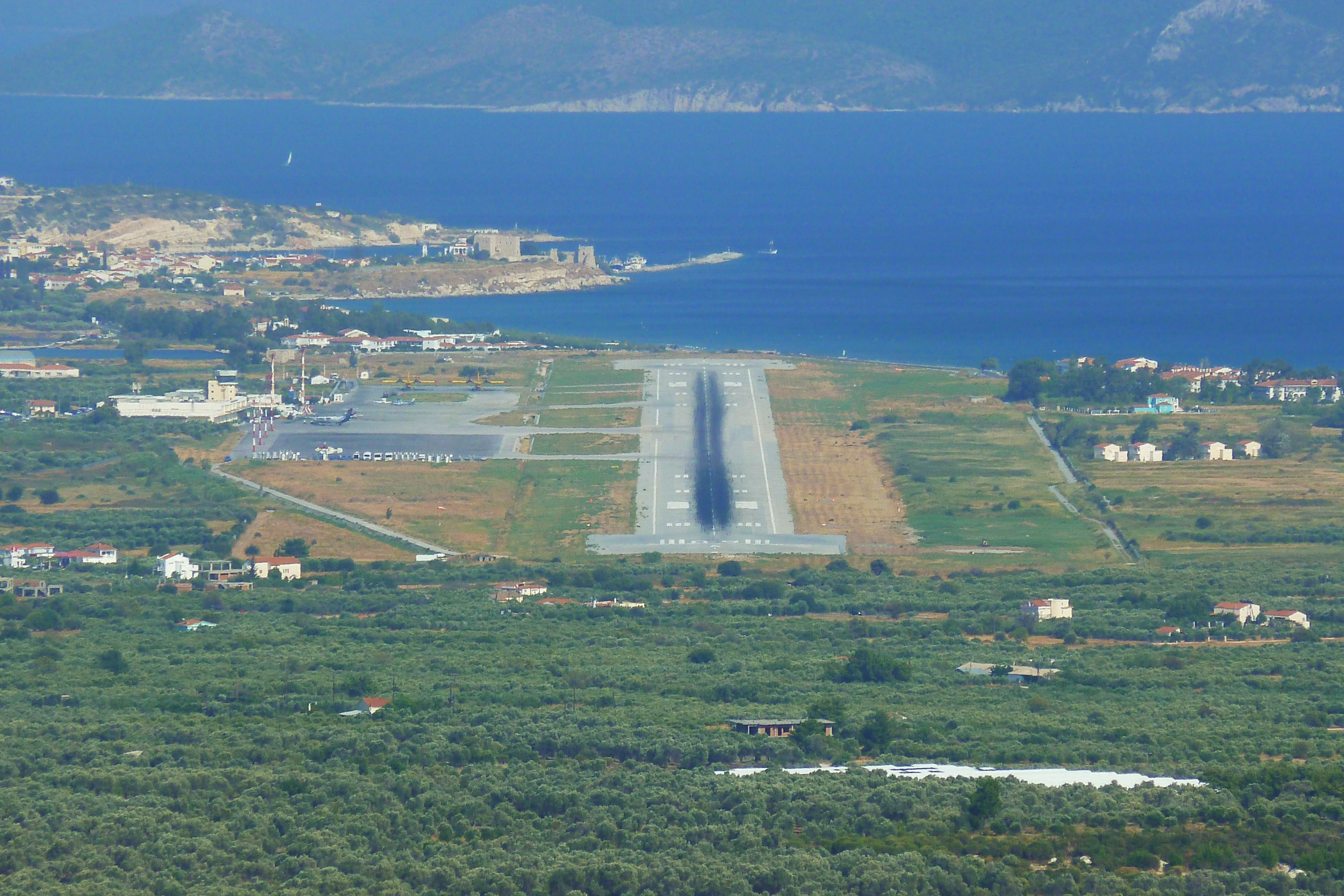
View of the airport from the west

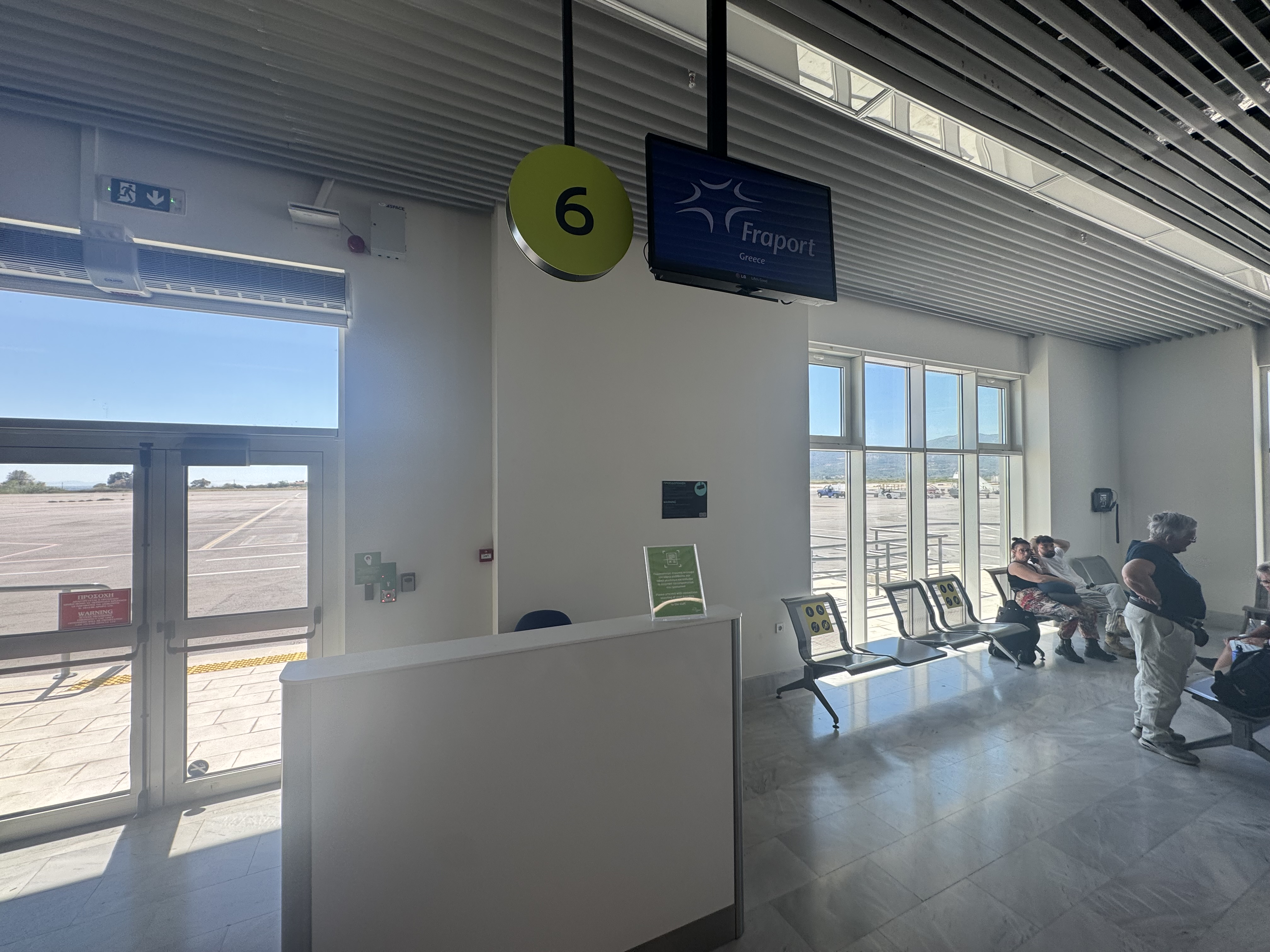
Boarding gate

This airside screen provides boarding information for upcoming departures

The following airlines operate regular scheduled and charter flights at Samos Airport:

Airlines	Destinations
Aegean Airlines	Athens
Austrian Airlines	Seasonal: Vienna
Brussels Airlines	Seasonal: Brussels
Condor	Seasonal: Frankfurt
Corendon Dutch Airlines	Seasonal: Amsterdam
Discover Airlines	Seasonal: Munich
Edelweiss Air	Seasonal: Zürich
Eurowings	Seasonal: Düsseldorf
Jet2.com	Seasonal: Birmingham, London–Stansted, Manchester
Neos	Seasonal: Milan–Malpensa
Olympic Air	Thessaloniki
Scandinavian Airlines	Seasonal charter: Stockholm–Arlanda Trondheim
Sky Express	Chios, Lemnos, Mytilene, Rhodes, Thessaloniki
Smartwings	Seasonal: Prague
Transavia	Seasonal: Amsterdam
TUI Airways	Seasonal: London–Gatwick Mytilene
TUI fly Belgium	Seasonal: Brussels
TUI fly Netherlands	Seasonal: Amsterdam
TUI fly Nordic	Seasonal charter: Stockholm–Arlanda

== Statistics ==
The data are from Hellenic Civil Aviation Authority (CAA) until 2016, and data from 2017 and later are from the official website of the airport.

Year	Passengers		
Year	Domestic	International	Total
1994	121,370	296,640	418,010
1995	▲132,269	▲282,192	▲414,461
1996	▲141,864	▼264,430	▼406,294
1997	▲149,564	▼263,334	▲412,898
1998	▼146,056	▲277,498	▲423,554
1999	▲189,132	▲314,704	▲503,836
2000	▼180,446	▼287,948	▼468,394
2001	▼154,004	▲304,686	▼458,690
2002	▼141,362	▼283,488	▼424,850
2003	▲142,212	▼266,835	▼409,047
2004	▲153,067	▼240,562	▼393,629
2005	▲155,534	▼236,593	▼392,127
2006	▲190,879	▲260,039	▲450,918
2007	▲216,605	▲265,382	▲481,987
2008	▼204,873	▲266,993	▼471,866
2009	▲216,174	▼230,968	▲447,142
2010	▼193,530	▼217,035	▼410,565
2011	▼172,672	▲236,048	▼408,720
2012	▼149,664	▼214,984	▼364,648
2013	▼136,641	▼207,076	▼343,717
2014	▲151,107	▲245,201	▲396,308
2015	▼149,302	▲253,848	▲403,150
2016	▲153,240	▼193,540	▼346,780
2017	▲161,313	▲248,972	▲410,331
2018	▲159,763	▲290,128	▲449,891
2019	▲168,892	▲298,503	▲467,395
2020	▼100,669	▼43,630	▼144,299
2021	▲131,580	▲138,718	▲270,298
2022	▲174,647	▲278,617	▲453,264
2023	▲193,356	▲283,950	▲477,306
2024	▼192,817	▲295,377	▲488,194
2025	▲210,689	▼285,728	▲496,417

=== Traffic statistics by country (2022) ===
Traffic by country at Samos International Airport – 2022
Place	Country	Total passengers
1	Greece	174,647
2	Netherlands	65,079
3	Germany	59,112
4	Sweden	27,007
5	Denmark	23,656
6	Poland	17,803
7	Belgium	14,944
8	Italy	13,488
9	Norway	13,011
10	Czech Republic	11,849
11	Finland	7,715
12	Slovenia	7,625
13	United Kingdom	6,827
14	Switzerland	4,282
15	Austria	3,599

== Accidents and incidents ==
- On 3 August 1989, Olympic Aviation Flight 545 crashed into Mount Kerkis while on approach to Samos Airport. All 31 passengers and all three crew members died in the accident.

== See also ==
- Transport in Greece
