= Athens Liosion Bus Station =

Bus station in Athens, Greece

Athens "Liosion" Bus Station

General information
- Location: Athens; Kato Patisia; Greece
- Coordinates: 38.0101454°N 23.7225005°E
- System: Intercity bus service
- Owner: KTEL
- Operator: KTEL
- Bus routes: 20+

Construction
- Parking: No
- Cycle facilities: No
- Accessible: No

Passengers
- 2016: 5 Million (approximately)
Location

Athens "Liosion" Bus Station also known as KTEL Liosion Bus Station is the second busiest bus station in Athens. It is located in Patisia in Athens Municipality. There are routes to Central Greece, Thessaly, Pieria. There are a lot of passengers that use the Bus Station and it is the second largest bus station in Athens after Athens Kifissos Bus Station. 5 million passengers travel to Central Greece and Thessaly via this bus station. The busiest route is to Chalkida. There are routes per 30 minutes. There are new plans to build a bus station in Elaionas, Athens that will serve all routes of the entire nation. The new Bus Station will open in 2026.

== Destinations ==
Buses	Cities
KTEL Boetias	Arachova, Livadeia, Schimatari, Thiva
KTEL Evias	Aliveri, Chalkida, Elymnion, Istiaia, Karystos, Kymi, Mantoudi, Neos Pyrgos, Skyros; Summer Routes: Aidipsos, Alonnisos, Skiathos, Skopelos
KTEL Evritanias	Karpenisi
KTEL Magnisias	Volos
KTEL Fthiotidos	Lamia, Stylida
KTEL Pieria	Platamon
KTEL Fokidos	Amfissa, Delphi
KTEL Karditsis	Karditsa
KTEL Trikalon	Trikala
KTEL Larissis	Larissa

== Ground Transport ==
There is an Athens Metro station close to the bus station, known as Kato Patisia in Line 1. There are a lot of taxis outside the terminal. Also there are a lot of bus routes that connect Athens city centre to the bus station, as well as a line that connects the airport with the Kifisos bus terminal which is the bus terminal for Peloponnese, Macedonia, Epirus, Thrace and the Ionian islands. X93 connects the Bus Terminal with Athens International Airport.
