= Athens Kifissos Bus Terminal =

Busiest bus station in Athens Greece

Coordinates: 37.997769°N 23.69931°E

Athens "Kifissos" Bus Station
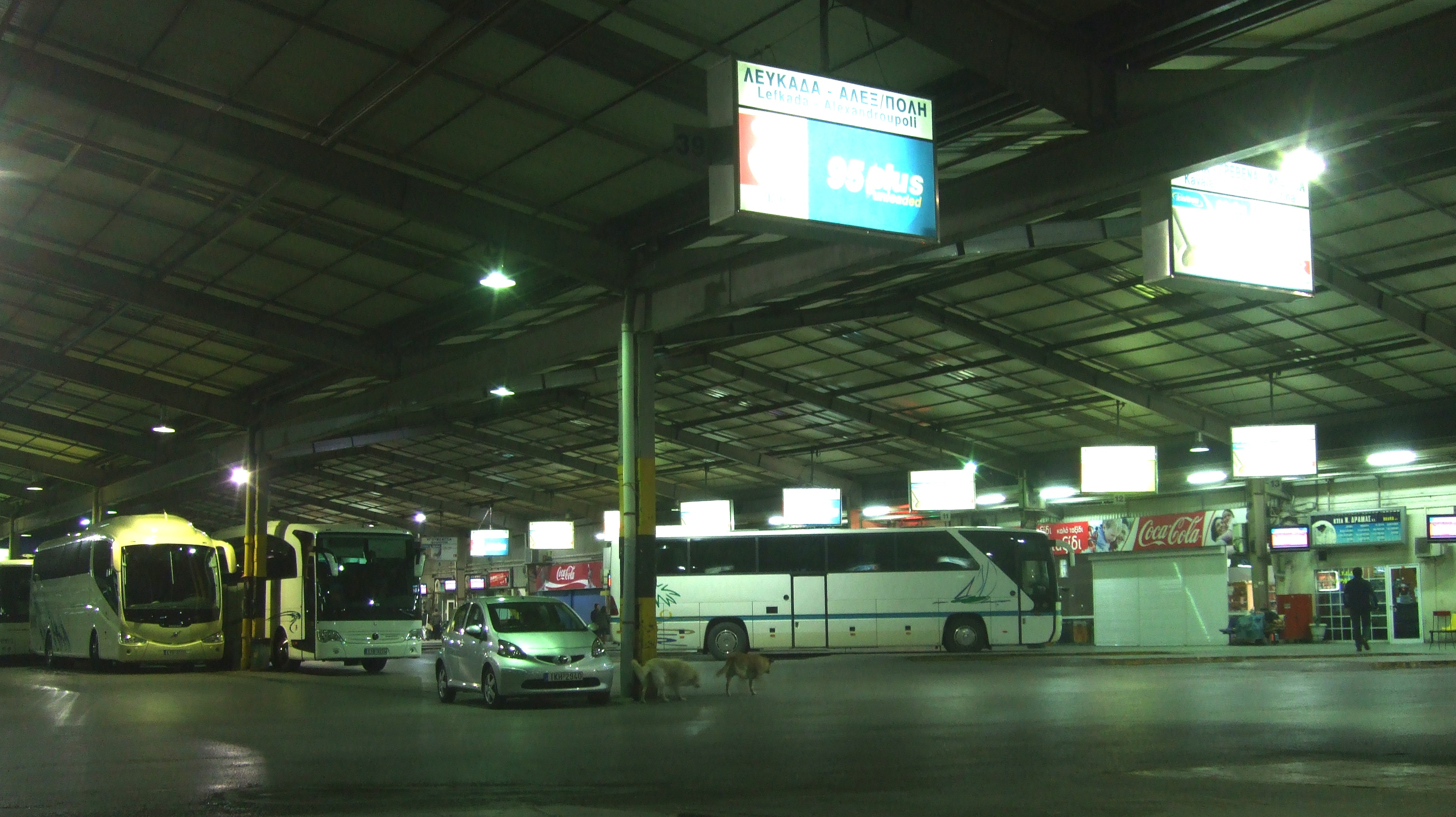
- Kifissos Bus Terminal (2017)

General information
- Location: Leof. Kifisou 100, Peristeri, Athina 104 42, Greece; Greece
- Owner: KTEL
- Connections: OASA bus connections: X93 (Airport Express), 051 (Metaxourghio metro station and Omonoia square), 052 (Elaionas Metro station), 420 (Piraeus port)

Construction
- Platform levels: 1
- Parking: No
- Cycle facilities: No

History
- Opened: 1967

Passengers
- 12 million annually
Location
- Location within Greece

Athens "Kifissos" Bus Station, also known as KTEL Kifissos Bus station, is the busiest intercity bus station in Athens. It is the largest bus terminal in Athens and the second-largest in Greece, the largest being the Thessaloniki "Macedonia" Intercity Bus Station. It is located in Peristeri towards Kifissou Avenue or European route E75. There are a lot of routes to Peloponnese, Epirus, Macedonia and Ionian Islands. For Thessaly and Central Greece there are routes from the second intercity Bus Station of Athens in Patisia known as "Athens Liosion Bus Station". Both of these stations will be replaced with the new Central bus station being built in Eleonas.

The bus station is used exclusively by KTEL buses. According to the latest available data, the station serves daily 24–44 thousands of passengers and around 12 million passengers annually. Due to the construction of new highways such as the A5 Ionia Odos and the A8 Olympia Odos, the routes have increased by 30% since 2009. The main buildings of the station are old and inadequate for a central bus station of a city like Athens. Inside the station, there are 63 ticket offices, some cafeterias and kiosks, and public toilets.

Athens International Airport is connected directly to bus station by OASA bus route X93 (operated by OSY). The buses set down passengers at the departures level and depart from the arrivals level of the airport, between exits 4 and 5. Bus route 051 connects the bus station with the Metaxourgeio metro station of Line 2 and Omonoia square and Omonoia metro station interchange station of Lines 1 and 2. Bus route 052 connects directly the bus station and the Elaionas metro station of Line 3. Bus route 420 connects the station and the port of Piraeus.

== New Athens intercity bus station ==
Plans have been approved for building a new central bus station in Eleonas, Athens which will be serving all routes in Greece. The new spacious bus station is going to have a surface of 66,400 m^{2} (715,000 sq ft) and will serve 15 million passengers annually. The new station will be next to Eleonas Metro stop on Line 3 providing connecting access to central Athens, Piraeus port and Athens International Airport.

Construction works are scheduled to begin in 2024 and the whole station will be operational in 2026. The total cost of the project is estimated at 180 million euros.

== Destinations ==
Buses	Cities
KTEL Achaias	Aigio, Akrata, Kalavryta, Patras
KTEL Argolidos	Argos, Epidaurus, Nafplion
KTEL Artis	Arta
KTEL Arkadias	Andritsaina, Astros, Leonidio, Megalopoli, Tripoli, Tropaia
KTEL Aitoloakarnanias	Aitoliko, Agrinio, Amfilochia, Astakos, Katouna, Makryneia, Missolonghi, Nafpaktos, Palairos, Plagia, Thermo, Vonitsa
KTEL Thesprotias	Igoumenitsa, Paramythia
KTEL Thessalonikis	Thessaloniki
KTEL Ioannina	Ioannina
KTEL Imathias	Veria
KTEL Kavalas	Kavala
KTEL Kozanis	Kozani
KTEL Grevena	Grevena
KTEL Florina	Florina
KTEL Pellis	Edessa
KTEL Xanthis	Xanthi
KTEL Rodopis	Komotini
KTEL Serron	Serres
KTEL Kastoria	Kastoria
KTEL Korinthias	Agioi Theodoroi, Corinth, Kiato, Loutraki, Nemea, Xilokastro
KTEL Messinias	Gargalianoi, Kalamata, Kyparissia, Messini
KTEL Zakynthou	Zakynthos (via Kyllini) (by boat)
KTEL Lefkadas	Lefkas
KTEL Kerkyras	Corfu
KTEL Dramas	Drama
KTEL Lakonias	Areopoli, Gerolimenas, Gythion, Monemvasia, Neapoli, Skala, Sparti
KTEL Ilias	Ancient Olympia, Amaliada, Gastouni, Kyllini, Pyrgos, Zacharo

== See also ==
- Athens Liosion Bus Station (Bus Terminal B)
