= Elaionas =

Elaionas Ελαιώνας
- Neighborhood
- Location in municipality of Athens
- Coordinates: 37°59′24″N 23°41′51″E
- Country: Greece
- Region: Attica
- City: Athens
- Postal code: 104 47, 122 42
- Area code: 210

Elaionas (Greek: Ελαιώνας, pronounced [e.leˈo.nas], sometimes Anglicized as Eleonas) is a neighborhood in Central Athens, Greece. It is an industrial area and one of the most deprived areas of the municipality of Athens.

== History ==
The area was named for the fact that in antiquity it was covered in an abundance of olive trees, a feature that it retains even today but to a smaller extent.

The olive tree was a basic symbol of Athenian democracy as a prize for the winners of the Ancient Olympic Games. By extension, its oil was a valuable commodity and the only Athenian product that was allowed to be exported and this gave impetus to the development of Elaionas.

During the Byzantine years, a large number of churches were built in the area, while the occupation of most of the inhabitants remained agricultural.

== Modern era ==
Today, Elaionas is an area of 9,500 acres consisting of generally unregulated buildings, with many abandoned craft industry buildings, some actively polluting companies, vacant or unused land and few inhabitants. Elaionas's factories employ up to 30,000 workers.

The upgrading and regeneration of the area has been a matter of concern to the Greek government many times, with the main proposals concerning opening new roads that will facilitate the establishment of enterprises and general de-industrialization.

Elaionas was the site of a large refugee camp for those fleeing Africa and the Middle East. It has also been for many years the location of a well known recyclers' bazaar, where second hand items are sold every weekend. Although the bazaar is mostly run by the Roma population, its diverse community of vendors also includes people from Greece, Pakistan, Turkey, Bulgaria, Syria and many other places.

An important plan is also the provision for the creation of a Panathinaikos new stadium in Votanikos and the creation of a metropolitan park.

At the same time, the creation of a new intercity bus agency in the area and its connection to the Athens metro is being examined, which would replace the existing Kifissos Bus Terminal and Liosion Bus Terminal.

The area is served by the metro station of the same name on Line 3 of the Athens metro.
