= Thessaloniki Bus Station =

Main bus station of Thessaloniki, Greece

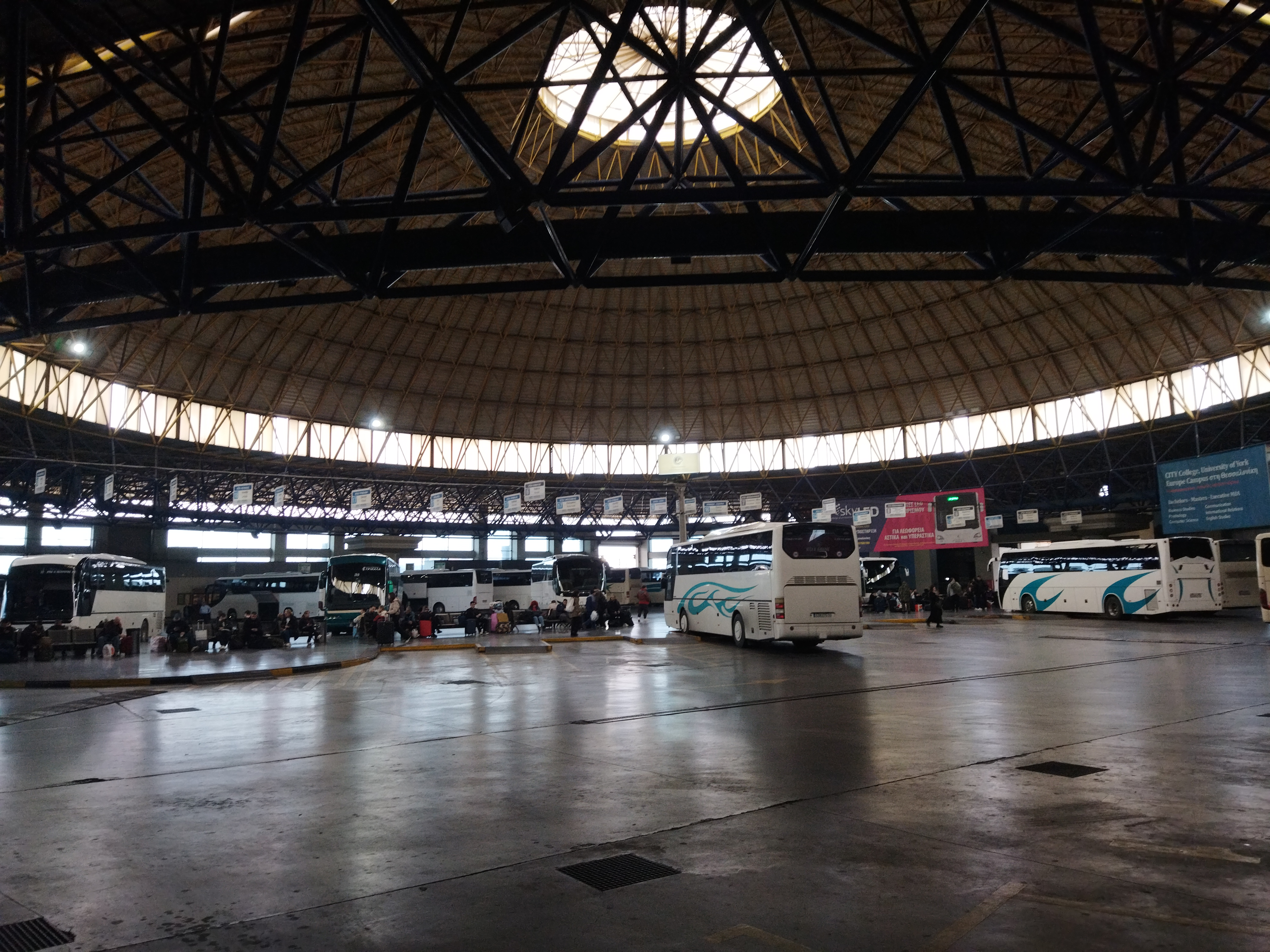

General information
- Location: Thessaloniki; Greece
- Coordinates: 40.6545°N 22.9024°E
- System: Intercity bus service
- Owner: KTEL
- Bus routes: 40+

Construction
- Parking: yes

History
- Opened: September 2002

Passengers
- 25,000 daily (approximately)
Location

Intercity Bus Station of Thessaloniki "Macedonia", also known as the KTEL Macedonia Intercity Bus station, is the main bus station of Thessaloniki, Greece and the largest bus terminal in Greece. It is located 5km from the city center in Menemeni. Construction began in October 1996 and it was opened to the public in September 2002. It serves about 20 to 25 thousand passengers and 800 coach departures per day to various cities all over Greece, as well as some routes to Albania, Bulgaria, North Macedonia, Germany and Turkey. It is connected with the rest of the city via OASTH, which operates about 120 buses per hour. The company, which operates the buses and owns the station is named KTEL. This terminal serves 40 KTEL (the bus companies in Greece for each province) routes, as well as some other bus lines internationally.

== Destinations ==
Lane	KTEL	Destination
Red Corridor
1	KTEL Kozanis	Kozani
2	KTEL Larissas	Larissa
2	KTEL Ileias	Pyrgos
2	KTEL Lesbou	Mytilene
3	KTEL Kerkyras	Kerkyra
3	KTEL Kilkis	Polykastro-Goumenissa
3	KTEL Kilkis	Kilkis
4	KTEL Pierias	Katerini
5	KTEL Serron	Serres
Grey Corridor
6	KTEL Kavalas	Kavala
7	KTEL Thessalonikis	Thessaloniki-Athens
7	KTEL Thessalonikis	Athens-Piraeus
8	KTEL Thessalonikis	Asprovalta-Stavro-Zagliveri
8	KTEL Rhodopis	Komotini
9	KTEL Florinas	Florina
10	KTEL Grevenon	Grevena
Blue Corridor
11	Collaborating KTEL Argolidos-Arcadias-Corinthias-Laconias	Nafplio-Tripoli-Corinth-Sparta
12	KTEL Achaias	Patra
13	KTEL Chalkidikis	Chalkidiki
14	KTEL Xanthis	Xanthi
15	—N/a	—N/a
16	Albania	Tirana
16	Bulgaria	Sofia
16	Turkey	Istanbul
17	KTEL Evias	Chalkida
17	KTEL Messenias	Kalamata
17	KTEL Prevezas	Preveza
17	KTEL Artas	Arta
17	KTEL Trikalon	Trikala
18	KTEL Zakynthou	Zakynthos
18	KTEL Lefkadas	Lefkada
18	KTEL Thesprotias	Igoumenitsa
18	KTEL Phthiotidas	Lamia
18	KTEL Magnesias	Volos
18	KTEL Evrou	Alexandroupoli
Green Corridor
19	KTEL Pellas	Edessa-Giannitsa
20	KTEL Imathias	Veria-Naousa
21	KTEL Karditsas	Karditsa
21	KTEL Kastorias	Kastoria
22	KTEL Chanion-Rethymnis	Chania
22	KTEL Aitoloakarnanias	Agrinio
23	KTEL Dramas	Drama
24	KTEL Herakliou-Lasithiou	Heraklio
24	KTEL Ioanninon	Ioannina
