= KTEL (Greece) =

Intercity public transport bus service in Greece

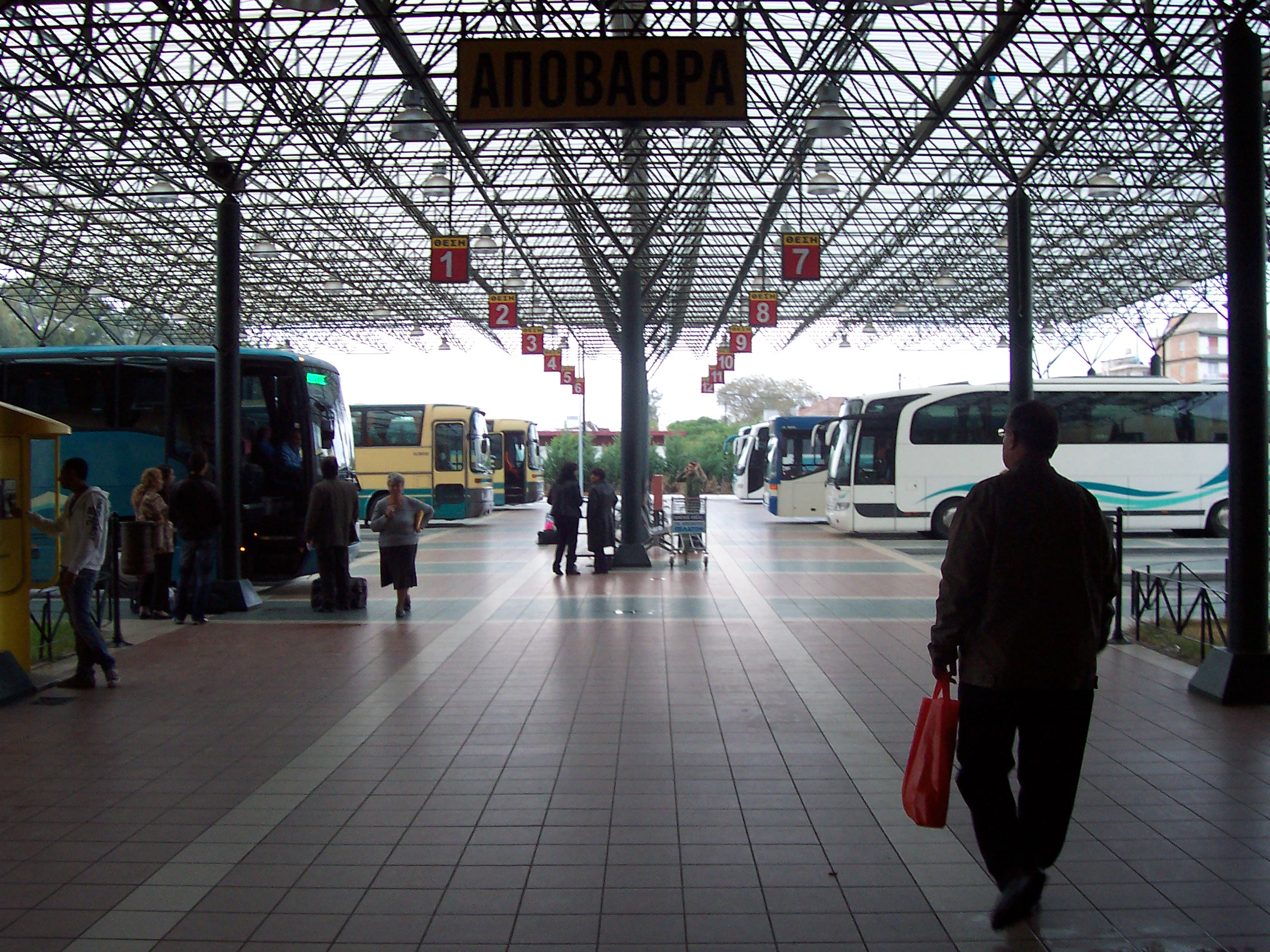
- KTEL bus station in Pyrgos
- Founded: 1952
- Headquarters: Athens, Greece
- Service area: Greece
- Service type: Intercity coach service
- Website: ktelbus.com

KTEL (Greek: Κοινό Ταμείο Εισπράξεων Λεωφορείων, Joint Bus Proceeds Fund) is the main intercity public transport bus service in Greece. It is a cooperation of 62 regional bus companies on the mainland of Greece and its islands. KTEL was founded in 1952, and the combined KTEL fleet numbers 4,199 buses as of 2023.

The KTEL companies provide 80% of all passenger transportation in Greece. Interregional transport, e.g. to Athens, is provided by most of the KTEL companies.

== KTEL services ==
Each unit is typically named after the regional unit it serves, e.g. KTEL Imathias for Imathia. The 62 entities consist of the following:

- KTEL Aiginas
- KTEL Aitoloakarnanias
- KTEL Androu
- KTEL Argolidas
- KTEL Arkadias
- KTEL Artas
- KTEL Attikis
- KTEL Achaias
- KTEL Grevenon
- KTEL Dramas
- KTEL Evrou
- KTEL Evias
- KTEL Evritanias
- KTEL Zakynthou
- KTEL Ileias
- KTEL Imathias
- KTEL Heraklion - Lassithi
- KTEL Thesprotias
- KTEL Thessalonikis
- KTEL Thivas
- KTEL Thiras
- KTEL Iou
- KTEL Ioanninon
- KTEL Kavalas
- KTEL Karditsas
- KTEL Karpathou
- KTEL Kastorias
- KTEL Kerkyras
- KTEL Kefallonias
- KTEL Kilkis
- KTEL Kozanis
- KTEL Korinthias
- KTEL Kos
- KTEL Lakonias
- KTEL Larissas
- KTEL Lesvou
- KTEL Lefkadas
- KTEL Lemnou
- KTEL Livadeias
- KTEL Magnisias
- KTEL Messinias
- KTEL Mykonou
- KTEL Naxou
- KTEL Xanthis
- KTEL Parou
- KTEL Pellas
- KTEL Pierias
- KTEL Prevezas
- KTEL Rodopis
- KTEL Rodou
- KTEL Salaminas
- KTEL Samou
- KTEL Serron
- KTEL Syrou
- KTEL Tinou
- KTEL Trikalon
- KTEL Fthiotidos
- KTEL Florinas
- KTEL Fokidas
- KTEL Chalkidikis
- KTEL Chanion - Rethimnou
- KTEL Chiou
