= Russo-Turkish War (1877–1878) =

Eleventh and penultimate conflict of the Russo-Turkish wars

- Part of the Great Eastern Crisis and the Russo-Turkish wars
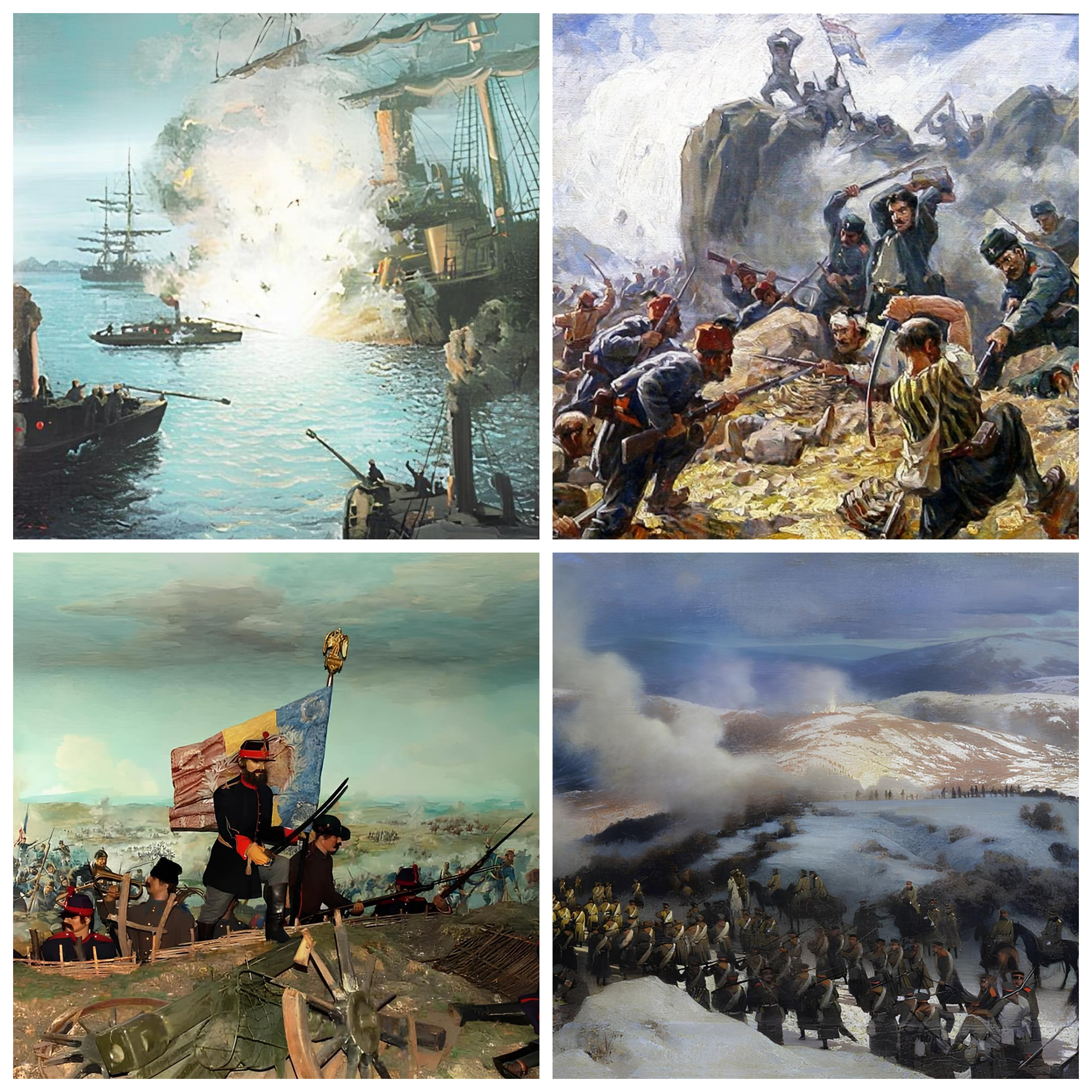
- Clockwise, from top left: the Action off Măcin, the Battle of Shipka Pass, the Battle of Tashkessen, the Siege of Plevna
Date	24 April 1877 – 3 March 1878 (10 months and 1 week)
Location	Balkans, Caucasus
Result	Russian coalition victory, see § Aftermath
Territorial changes	Establishment of the Principality of Bulgaria; Independence of Romania, Serbia and Montenegro from the Ottoman Empire; Kars and Batum oblasts become part of the Russian Empire, Britain occupies Cyprus, Austria-Hungary occupies Bosnia; Russian annexation of Southern Bessarabia from Romania, Romanian annexation of Northern Dobruja; Greek annexation of Thessaly and Arta

Belligerents
Russian Empire; Guard of Finland; Bulgarian Legion; Romania; Serbia; Montenegro; Greece Greek rebels Serbian rebels Kurdish rebels	Ottoman Empire; Albanian volunteers; Circassian volunteers; Polish Legion; Kurdish volunteers

Commanders and leaders
(Russian Empire) Alexander II; (Russian Empire) GD. Mikhail; (Russian Empire) Dmitry Milyutin; (Russian Empire) Iosif Gurko; (Russian Empire) Mikhail Loris-Melikov; (Russian Empire) Arshak Ter-Gukasov; (Russian Empire) Prince Alexander; (Russian Empire) Mikhail Dragomirov (WIA); (Russian Empire) Ivan Lazarev; (Kingdom of Romania) Carol I; (Serbia) Milan I; (Serbia) Kosta Protić	(Ottoman Empire) Abdul Hamid II; (Ottoman Empire) Muhtar Pasha; (Ottoman Empire) Osman Pasha (surrendered); (Ottoman Empire) Süleyman Pasha; (Ottoman Empire) Abdülkerim Pasha; (Ottoman Empire) Eyüb Pasha

Strength
(Russian Empire) Russia: Initial: 185,000 in the Army of the Danube, 75,000 in the Caucasian Army Total: 260,000 in four corps Romania: Around 114,000 Greece: Around 25,000	Ottoman Empire: Initial: 70,000 in the Caucasus; Total: 281,000; Spring of 1877; Olender: 490,000–530,000; Barry: 378,000

Casualties and losses
Total: 96,733–111,166 dead: (Russian Empire) Russia; 15,567–30,000 killed; 81,166 died of disease; 56,652 wounded; 1,713 died from wounds; Romania; 4,302 killed and missing; 3,316 wounded; 19,904 sick; Bulgarian Legion; 2,456 killed and wounded; Several thousand total military deaths (mostly disease); Serbia and Montenegro; 2,400 dead and wounded; Greece; Unknown dead and wounded	Total: 90,000–120,000 dead: Ottoman Empire; 30,000 killed; 60,000–90,000 died from wounds and diseases; 110,000 captured
- See § Civilian casualties

The Russo-Turkish War (Note: Turkish: 93 Harbi, lit. 'War of '93', named for the year 1293 in the Islamic calendar; Russian: Русско-турецкая война, romanized: Russko-turetskaya voyna) (1877–1878) was a conflict between the Ottoman Empire and a coalition led by the Russian Empire which included Romania, Serbia, and Montenegro. Precipitating factors included the Russian goals of recovering territorial losses endured during the Crimean War of 1853–1856, re-establishing itself in the Black Sea and supporting the political movement attempting to free Balkan nations from the Ottoman Empire.

The Russian-led coalition won the war, pushing the Ottomans back all the way to the gates of Constantinople, leading to the intervention of the Western European great powers. As a result, Russia succeeded in claiming provinces in the Caucasus, namely Kars and Batum, and also annexed the Budjak region. The principalities of Romania, Serbia, and Montenegro, each of which had had de facto sovereignty for some years, formally proclaimed independence from the Ottoman Empire. After almost five centuries of Ottoman domination (1396–1878), Bulgaria emerged as an autonomous state with support and military intervention from Russia. Moreover, Greece annexed parts of Thessaly and Arta.

== Background ==
=== Treatment of Christians in the Ottoman Empire ===
Article 9 of the 1856 Paris Peace Treaty, concluded at the end of the Crimean War, obliged the Ottoman Empire to grant Christians equal rights with Muslims. Before the treaty was signed, the Ottoman government issued an edict, the Reform Edict of 1856, which proclaimed the principle of the equality of Muslims and non-Muslims, and produced some specific reforms to this end. For example, the jizya tax was abolished and non-Muslims were allowed to join the army.

==== Crisis in Lebanon, 1860 ====
In 1858, stirred by their clergy, the Maronite peasants of northern Lebanon revolted against their predominantly Druze feudal overlords and established a peasant republic. In southern Beirut vilayet, where both Maronite and Druze peasants worked under Druze overlords, Druze peasants sided with their co-religionists and against the Maronites, transforming the conflict into a civil war. Although both sides suffered casualties, about 10,000 Maronites were massacred at the hands of the Druze.

Fearing European intervention, the Ottoman foreign minister Mehmed Fuad Pasha was dispatched to Syria and immediately set about trying to resolve the conflict as swiftly as possible. Mehmed sought out and executed the agitators on all sides, including the governor and other officials. Order was soon restored, and preparations made to give Lebanon new autonomy. These efforts were ultimately not enough to prevent European intervention, however, with France deploying a fleet in September 1860. Fearing that a unilateral intervention would increase French influence in the region at their expense, the British joined the French expedition. Faced with further European pressure, the Sultan agreed to appoint a Christian governor in Lebanon, whose candidacy was to be submitted by the Sultan and approved by the European powers.

=== Changing balance of power in Europe ===
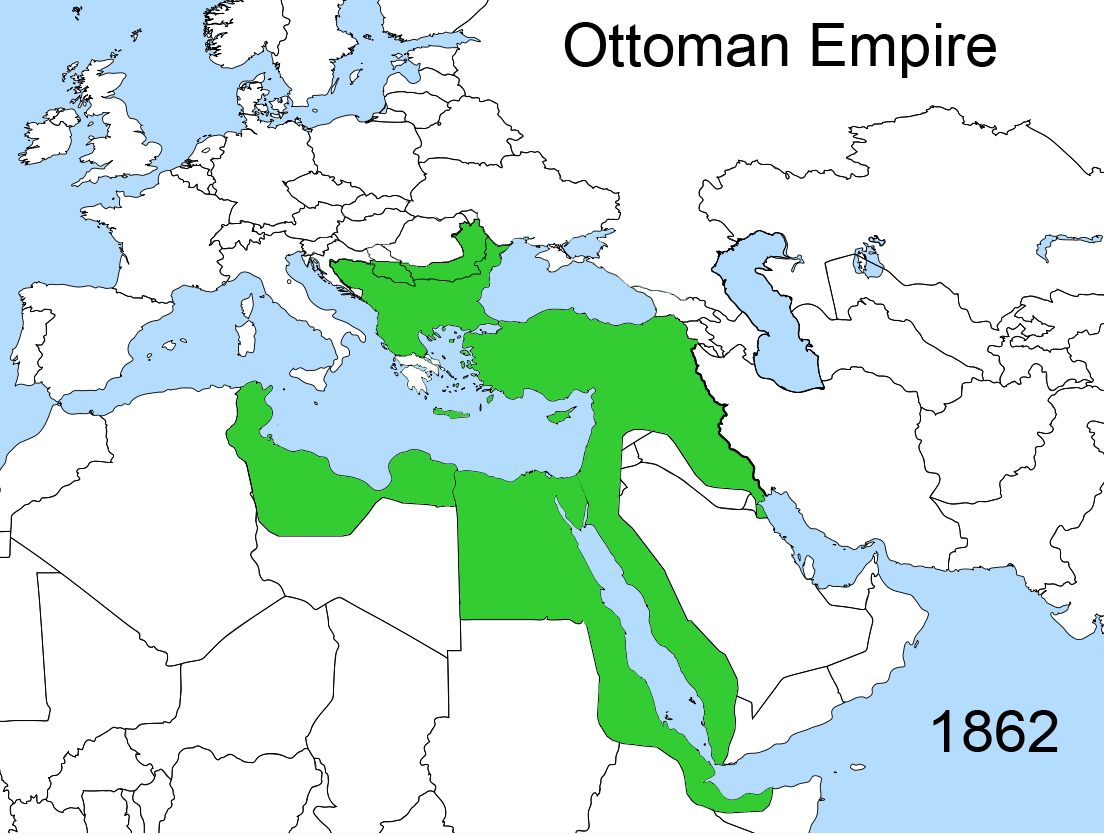
Ottoman Empire in 1862

Although on the winning side in the Crimean War, the Ottoman Empire continued to decline in power and prestige. The financial strain on the treasury forced the Ottoman government to take a series of foreign loans at such steep interest rates that, despite all the fiscal reforms that followed, pushed it into unpayable debts and economic difficulties. This was further aggravated by the need to accommodate more than 600,000 Muslim Circassians, expelled by the Russians from the Caucasus, to the Black Sea ports of north Anatolia and the Balkan ports of Constanța and Varna, which cost a great deal in money and in civil disorder to the Ottoman authorities.

==== The New European Concert ====
The Concert of Europe established in 1814 was shaken in 1859 when France and Austria fought over Italy. It came apart completely as a result of the wars of German Unification, when the Kingdom of Prussia, led by Chancellor Otto von Bismarck, defeated Austria in 1866 and France in 1870, replacing Austria as the dominant power in Central Europe. Britain, diverted by the Irish question and averse to warfare, chose not to intervene again to restore the European balance. Bismarck did not wish the breakup of the Ottoman Empire to create rivalries that might lead to war, so he took up Tsar Alexander II of Russia's earlier suggestion that arrangements be made in case the Ottoman Empire fell apart, creating the Three Emperors' League with Austria-Hungary and Russia to keep France isolated on the continent.

France responded by supporting self-determination movements, particularly if they concerned the three emperors and the Sultan. Thus revolts in Poland against Russia and national aspirations in the Balkans were encouraged by France. Russia worked to regain its right to maintain a fleet on the Black Sea and vied with the French in gaining influence in the Balkans by using the new Pan-Slavic idea that all Slavs should be united under Russian leadership. This could be done only by destroying the two empires where most non-Russian Slavs lived, the Habsburg and the Ottoman Empires. The ambitions and the rivalries of the Russians and French in the Balkans surfaced in Serbia, which was experiencing its own national revival and had ambitions that partly conflicted with those of the great powers.

==== Russia after the Crimean War ====
Russia ended the Crimean War with minimal territorial losses, but was forced to destroy its Black Sea Fleet and Sevastopol fortifications. Russian international prestige was damaged, and for many years revenge for the Crimean War became the main goal of Russian foreign policy. This was not easy though: the Paris peace treaty included guarantees of Ottoman territorial integrity by Great Britain, France and Austria, and only Prussia remained friendly to Russia.

The newly appointed Russian chancellor, Alexander Gorchakov, depended upon alliance with Prussia and its chancellor Bismarck. Russia consistently supported Prussia in her wars with Denmark (1864), Austria (1866) and France (1870). In March 1871, using the crushing French defeat and the support of a grateful Germany, Russia achieved international recognition of its earlier denouncement of Article 11 of the Paris Peace Treaty, thus enabling it to revive the Black Sea Fleet.

Other clauses of the Paris Peace Treaty, however, remained in force, specifically Article 8 with guarantees of Ottoman territorial integrity by Great Britain, France and Austria. Therefore, Russia was extremely cautious in its relations with the Ottoman Empire, coordinating all its actions with other European powers. A Russian war with Turkey would require at least the tacit support of all other Great Powers, and Russian diplomacy was waiting for a convenient moment.

== Balkan crisis of 1875–1876 ==
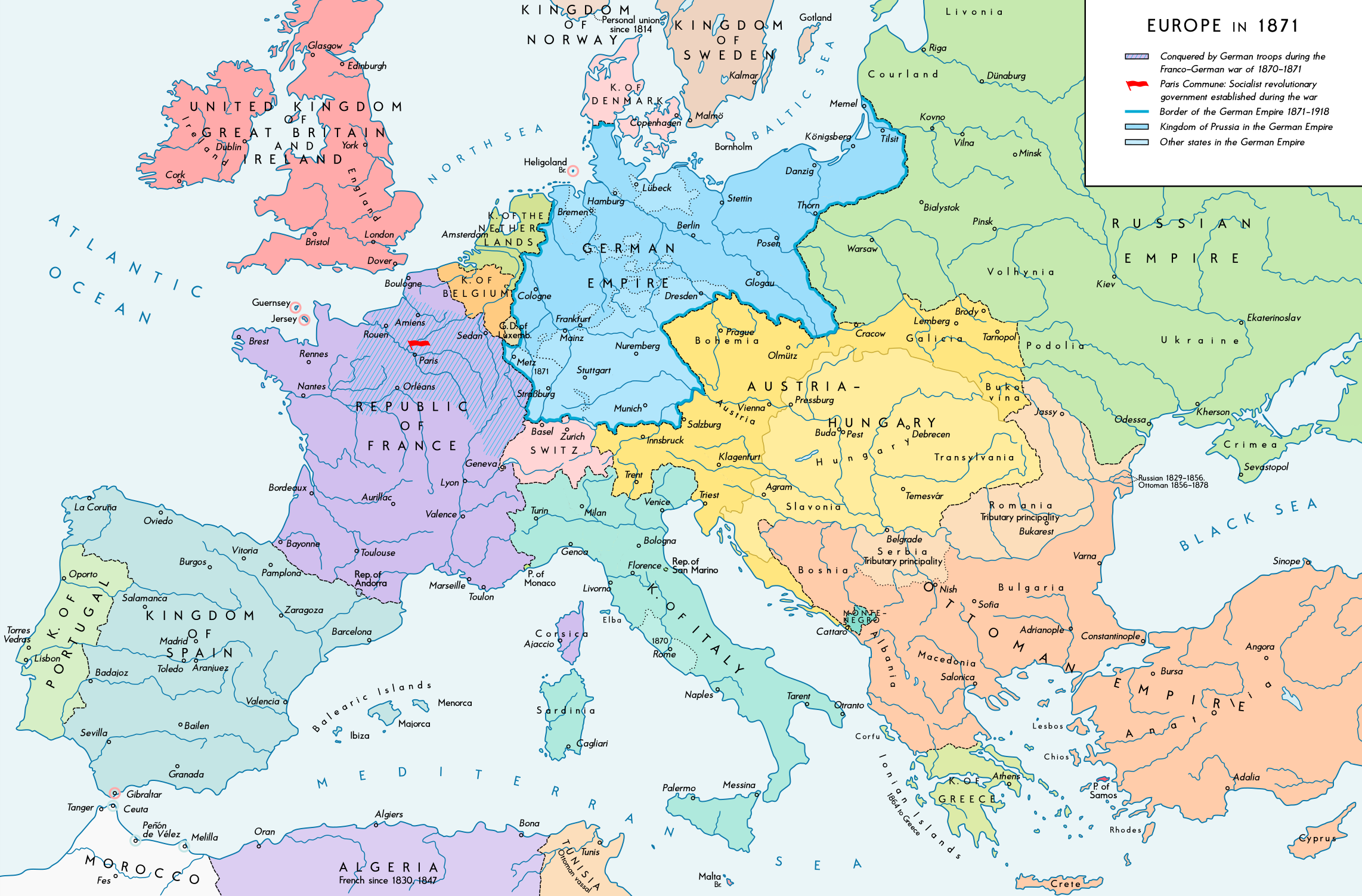
Europe before the Balkan crisis

In 1875, a series of Balkan events brought Europe to the brink of war. The state of Ottoman administration in the Balkans continued to deteriorate throughout the 19th century, with the central government occasionally losing control over whole provinces. Reforms imposed by European powers did little to improve the conditions of the Christian population, while managing to dissatisfy a sizable portion of the Muslim population. Bosnia and Herzegovina suffered at least two waves of rebellion by the local Muslim population, the most recent ending in 1862.

Austria-Hungary consolidated after the turmoil of the first half of the century and sought to reinvigorate its centuries long policy of expansion at the expense of the Ottoman Empire. Meanwhile, the nominally autonomous, de facto independent principalities of Serbia and Montenegro also sought to expand into regions inhabited by their compatriots. Nationalist and irredentist sentiments were strong and were encouraged by Russia and her agents. At the same time, a severe drought in Anatolia in 1873 and flooding in 1874 caused famine and widespread discontent in the heart of the Empire. The agricultural shortages precluded the collection of necessary taxes, which forced the Ottoman government to declare bankruptcy in October 1875 and increase taxes on outlying provinces including the Balkans.

=== Balkan uprisings ===
==== The revolt in Crete, 1866–1869 ====
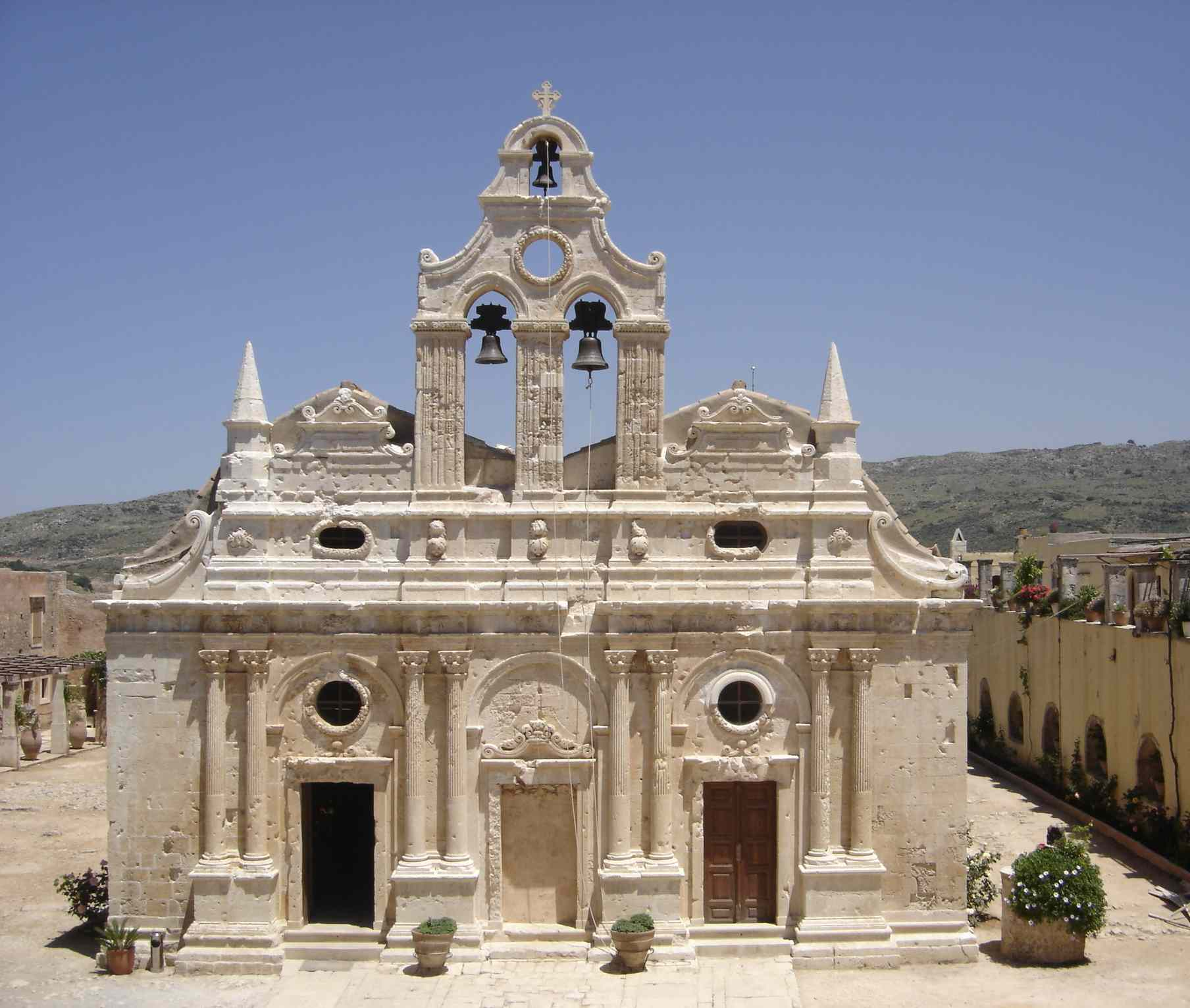
The Moni Arkadiou monastery

The Cretan Revolt, which began in 1866, resulted from the failure of the Ottoman Empire to apply reforms for improving the life of the population and the Cretans' desire for enosis – union with Greece. The insurgents gained control over the whole island, except for five fortified cities where the Muslims took refuge. The Greek press claimed that Muslims had massacred Greeks and the word was spread throughout Europe. Thousands of Greek volunteers were mobilized and sent to the island.

The siege of Arkadi Monastery became particularly well known. In November 1866, about 250 Cretan Greek combatants and around 600 women and children were besieged by about 23,000 mainly Cretan Muslims aided by Ottoman troops, and this became widely known in Europe. After a bloody battle with a large number of casualties on both sides, the Cretan Greeks finally surrendered when their ammunition ran out but were killed upon surrender.

By early 1869, the insurrection was suppressed, but the Porte offered some concessions, introducing island self-rule and increasing Christian rights on the island. Although the Cretan crisis ended better for the Ottomans than almost any other diplomatic confrontation of the century, the insurrection, and especially the brutality with which it was suppressed, led to greater public attention in Europe to the oppression of Christians in the Ottoman Empire.

Small as the amount of attention is which can be given by the people of England to the affairs of Turkey ... enough was transpiring from time to time to produce a vague but a settled and general impression that the Sultans were not fulfilling the "solemn promises" they had made to Europe; that the vices of the Turkish government were ineradicable; and that whenever another crisis might arise affecting the "independence" of the Ottoman Empire, it would be wholly impossible to afford to it again the support we had afforded in the Crimean war.

==== Herzegovina Uprising ====
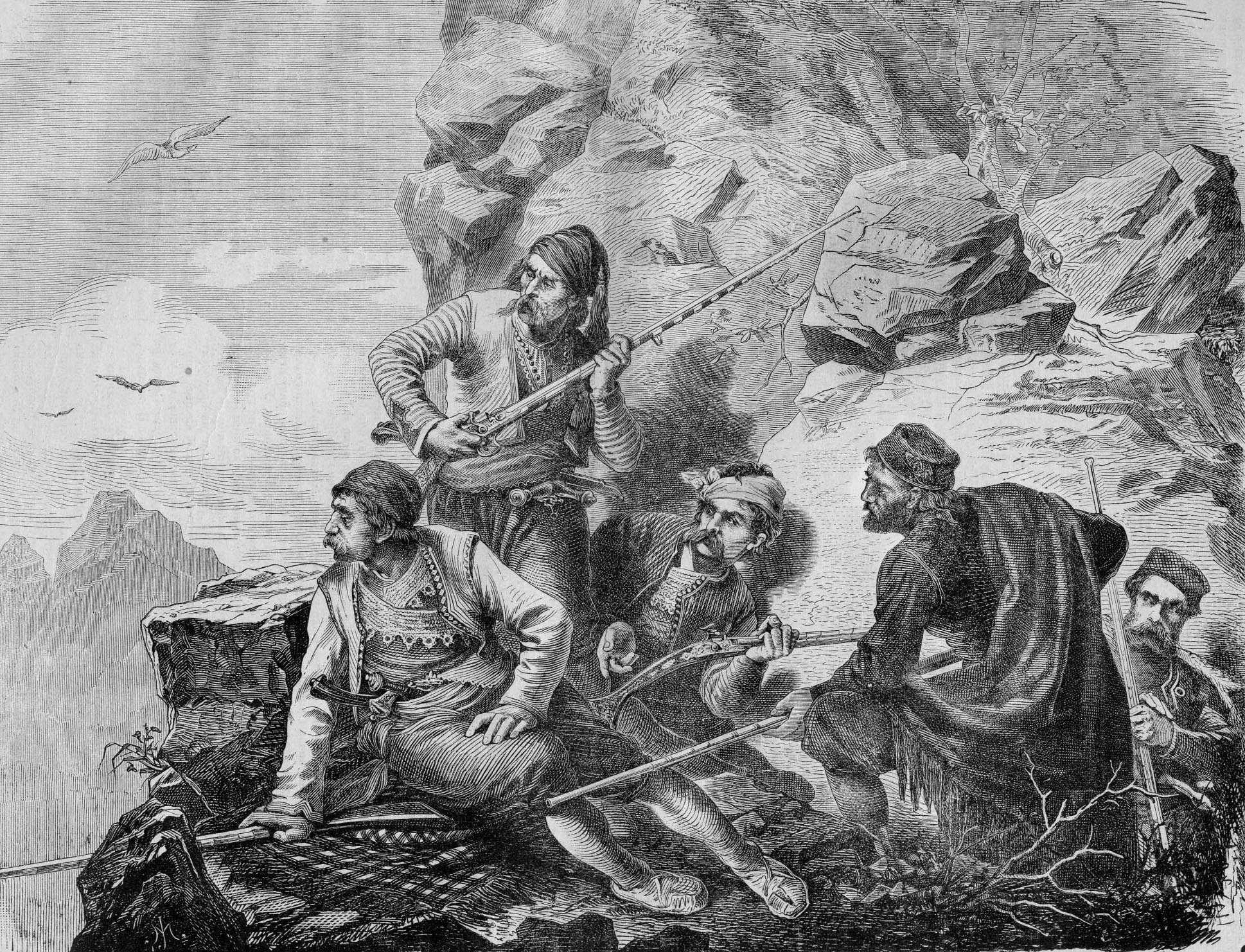
Herzegovinian Serb insurgents in 1875

An uprising against Ottoman rule began by Serbs in Herzegovina in July 1875. By August almost all of Herzegovina had been seized and the revolt had spread into Bosnia. Supported by nationalist volunteers from Serbia and Montenegro, the uprising continued as the Ottomans committed more and more troops to suppress it.

==== Bulgarian Uprising ====
The Serb revolt of Bosnia and Herzegovina spurred Bucharest-based Bulgarian revolutionaries into action. In 1875, a Bulgarian uprising was hastily prepared to take advantage of Ottoman preoccupation, but it fizzled before it started. In the spring of 1876, another uprising erupted in the south-central Bulgarian lands despite the fact that there were numerous regular Turkish troops in those areas.

A special Turkish military committee was established to quell the uprising. Regular troops (Nizam) and irregulars (Redif or Bashi-bazouk) were directed to fight the Bulgarians (11 May – 9 June 1876). The irregulars were mostly drawn from the Muslim inhabitants of the Bulgarian region. Many were Circassians from the Caucasus or Crimean Tatars who were expelled during the Crimean War; some were Islamized Bulgarians. The Ottoman army suppressed the revolt, massacring up to 30,000 people in the process. Five thousand out of the seven thousand villagers of Batak were put to death. Both Batak and Perushtitsa, where the majority of the population was also massacred, participated in the rebellion. Many of the perpetrators of those massacres were later decorated by the Ottoman high command.

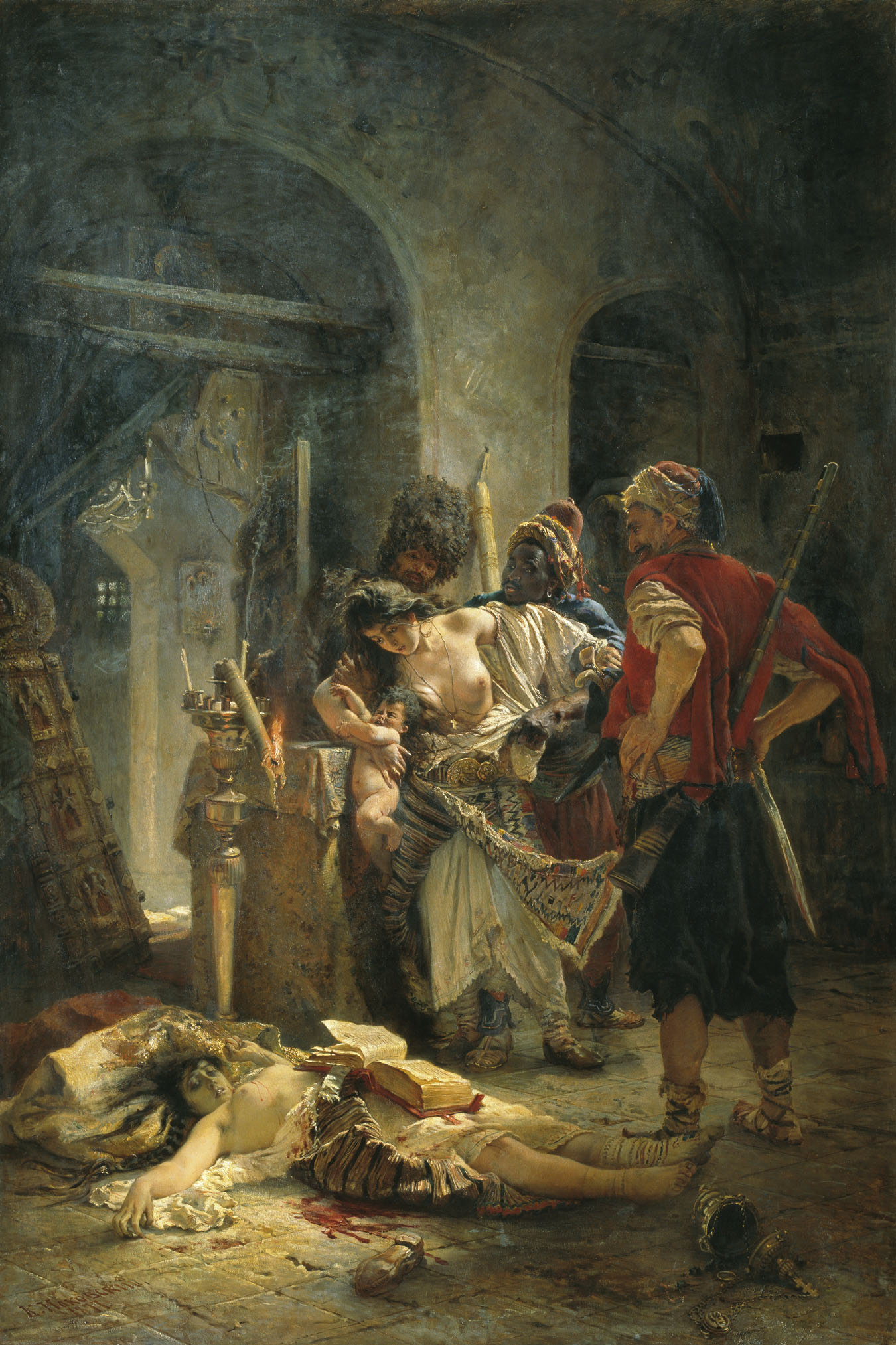
Konstantin Makovsky, The Bulgarian Martyresses, a painting depicting the atrocities of bashibazouks in Bulgaria.

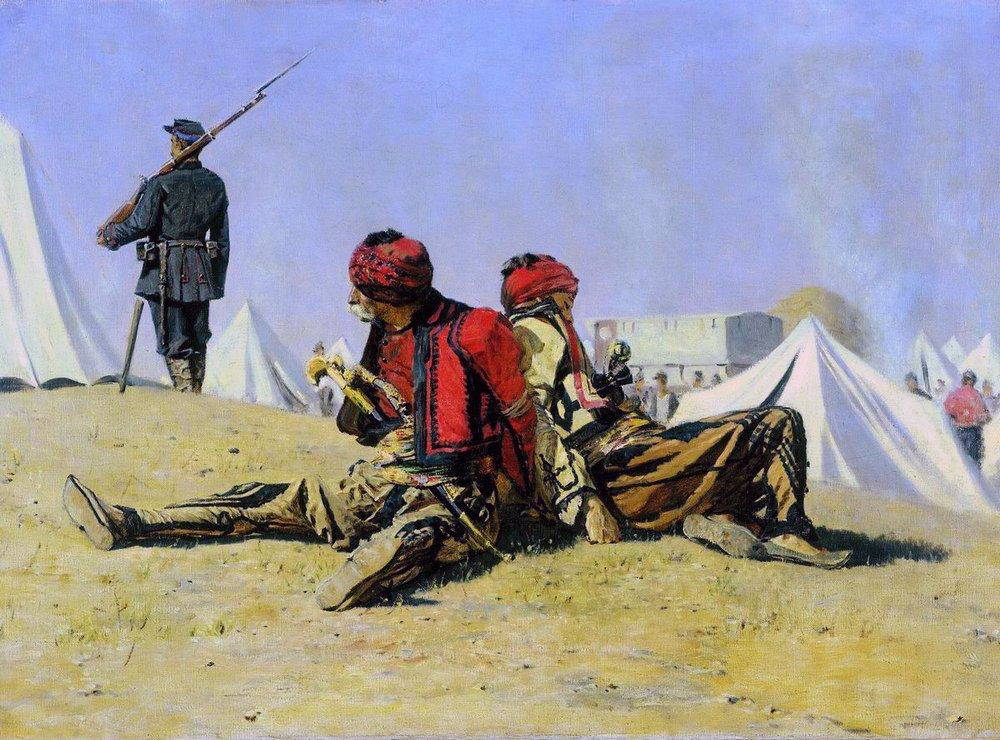
Two Hawks by Vasily Vereshchagin, showing two Bashibazouks held captive by the Romanian and Russian armies.

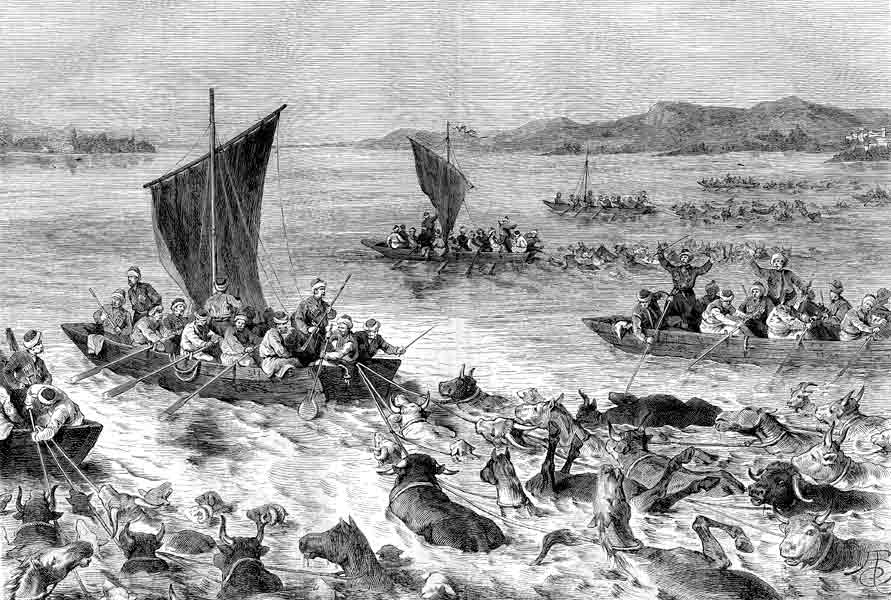
Bashi-bazouks, returning with the spoils from the Romanian shore of the Danube. 1877 engraving.

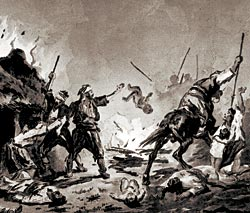
Bashi-bazouks' atrocities in Bulgaria.

=== International reaction to atrocities in Bulgaria ===
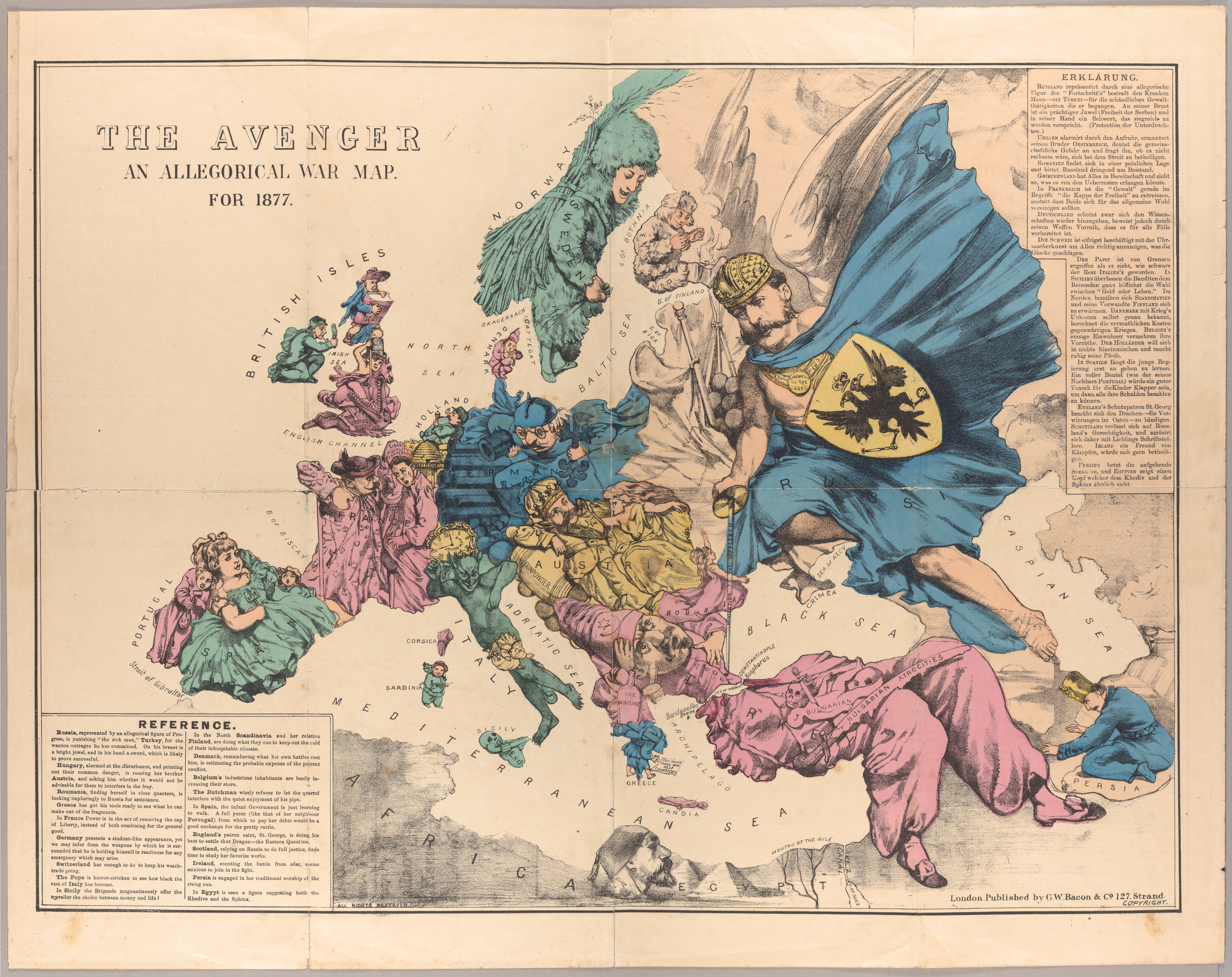
The Avenger: An Allegorical War Map for 1877 by Fred. W. Rose, 1877: This map reflects the "Great Eastern Crisis" and the subsequent Russo-Turkish War of 1877–78.

Word of the bashi-bazouks' atrocities filtered to the outside world by way of the American-run Robert College located in Constantinople. The majority of the students were Bulgarian, and many received news of the events from their families back home. Soon the Western diplomatic community in Constantinople was abuzz with rumours, which eventually found their way into newspapers in the West. While in Constantinople in 1879, Protestant missionary George Warren Wood reported Turkish authorities in Amasia brutally persecuting Christian Armenian refugees from Soukoum Kaleh. He was able to coordinate with British diplomat Edward Malet to bring the matter to the attention of the Sublime Porte, and then to the British Foreign Secretary Robert Gascoyne-Cecil (the Marquess of Salisbury). In Britain, where Disraeli's government was committed to supporting the Ottomans in the ongoing Balkan crisis, the Liberal opposition newspaper The Daily News hired American journalist Januarius A. MacGahan to report on the massacre stories first-hand.

MacGahan toured the stricken regions of the Bulgarian uprising, and his report, splashed across The Daily News's front pages, galvanized British public opinion against Disraeli's pro-Ottoman policy. In September, opposition leader William Ewart Gladstone published his Bulgarian Horrors and the Question of the East calling upon Britain to withdraw its support for Turkey and proposing that Europe demand independence for Bulgaria and Bosnia and Herzegovina. As the details became known across Europe, many dignitaries, including Charles Darwin, Oscar Wilde, Victor Hugo and Giuseppe Garibaldi, publicly condemned the Ottoman abuses in Bulgaria.

The strongest reaction came from Russia. Widespread sympathy for the Bulgarian cause led to a nationwide surge in patriotism on a scale comparable with the one during the Patriotic War of 1812. From autumn 1875, the movement to support the Bulgarian uprising involved all classes of Russian society. This was accompanied by sharp public discussions about Russian goals in this conflict: Slavophiles, including Fyodor Dostoevsky, saw in the impending war the chance to unite all Orthodox nations under Russia's helm, thus fulfilling what they believed was the historic mission of Russia, while their opponents, westernizers, inspired by Ivan Turgenev, denied the importance of religion and believed that Russian goals should not be defense of Orthodoxy but liberation of Bulgaria.

=== Serbo-Turkish War and diplomatic maneuvering ===
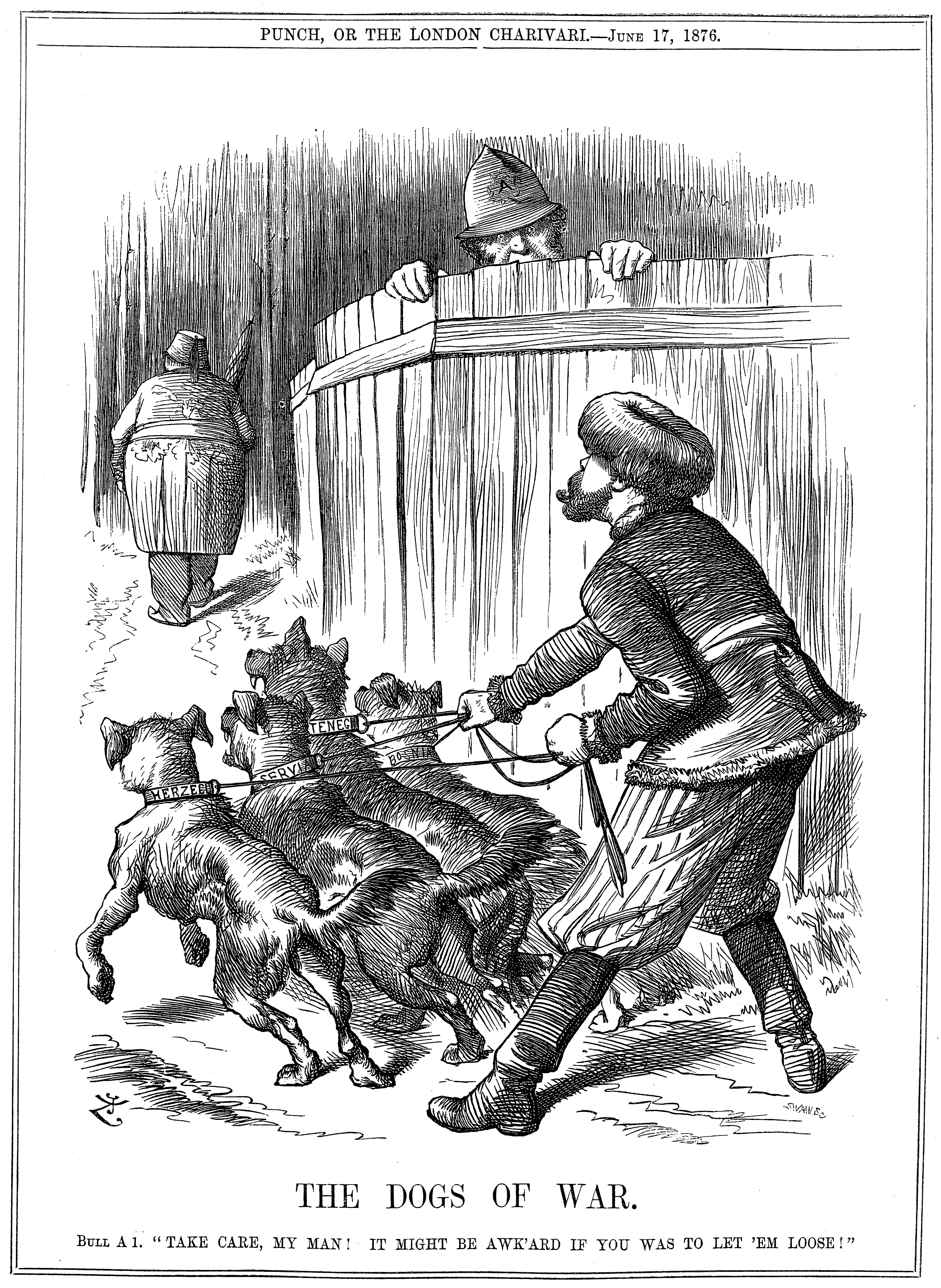
Russia preparing to release the Balkan dogs of war, while Britain warns him to take care. Punch cartoon from 17 June 1876

On 30 June 1876, Serbia, followed by Montenegro, declared war on the Ottoman Empire. In July and August, the ill-prepared and poorly equipped Serbian army helped by Russian volunteers failed to achieve offensive objectives but did manage to repulse the Ottoman offensive into Serbia. Meanwhile, Alexander II of Russia and Prince Gorchakov met Austria-Hungary's Franz Joseph I and Count Andrássy in the Reichstadt castle in Bohemia. No written agreement was made, but during the discussions, Russia agreed to support Austrian occupation of Bosnia and Herzegovina, and Austria-Hungary, in exchange, agreed to support the return of Southern Bessarabia – lost by Russia during the Crimean War – and Russian annexation of the port of Batum on the east coast of the Black Sea. Bulgaria was to become autonomous (independent, according to the Russian records).

As the fighting in Bosnia and Herzegovina continued, Serbia suffered a string of setbacks and asked the European powers to mediate an end to the war. A joint ultimatum by the European powers forced the Porte to give Serbia a one-month truce and start peace negotiations. Turkish peace conditions however were refused by European powers as too harsh. In early October, after the truce expired, the Turkish army resumed its offensive and the Serbian position quickly became desperate. On 31 October, Russia issued an ultimatum requiring the Ottoman Empire to stop the hostilities and sign a new truce with Serbia within 48 hours. This was supported by the partial mobilization of the Imperial Russian Army (up to 20 divisions). Sultan Abdul Hamid II accepted the conditions of the ultimatum.

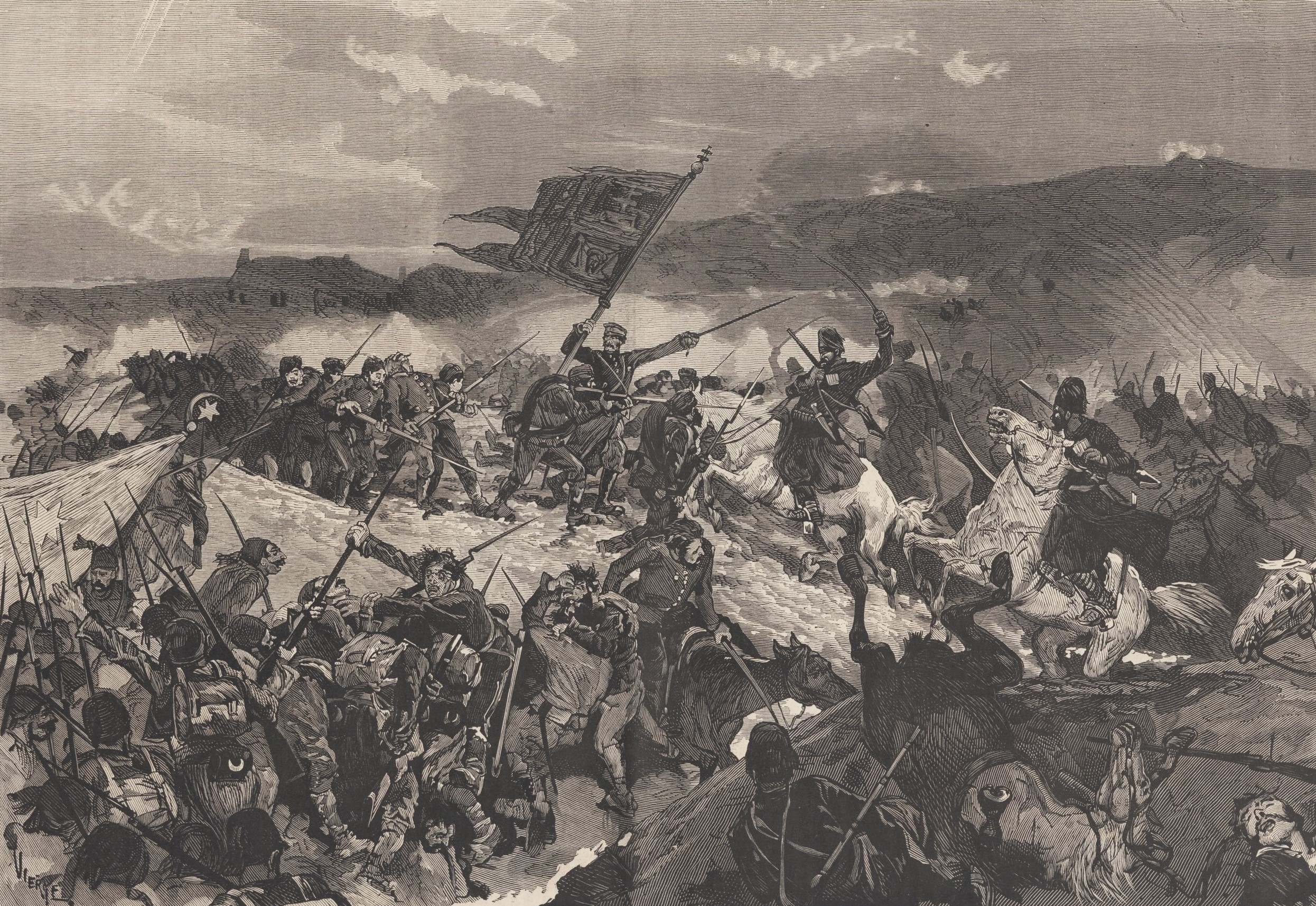
Battle of Đunis on 17 October 1876

To resolve the crisis, on 11 December 1876, the Constantinople Conference of the Great Powers was opened in Constantinople (to which Ottoman representatives were not invited). A compromise solution was negotiated, granting autonomy to Bulgaria, Bosnia and Herzegovina under the joint control of European powers. The Ottomans, however, refused to sacrifice their independence by allowing international representatives to oversee the institution of reforms and sought to discredit the conference by announcing on 23 December, the day the conference was closed, that a constitution was adopted that declared equal rights for religious minorities within the Empire. The Ottomans attempted to use this maneuver to get their objections and amendments to the agreement heard. When they were rejected by the Great Powers, the Ottoman Empire announced its decision to disregard the results of the conference.

On 15 January 1877, Russia and Austria-Hungary signed a written agreement confirming the results of the earlier Reichstadt Agreement of July 1876. This assured Russia of the benevolent neutrality of Austria-Hungary in the impending war. These terms meant that in case of war Russia would do the fighting and Austria-Hungary would derive most of the advantage. Russia therefore made a final effort for a peaceful settlement. After reaching an agreement with its main Balkan rival and with anti-Ottoman sympathies running high throughout Europe due to the Bulgarian atrocities and the rejection of the Constantinople agreements, Russia finally felt free to declare war. It has been suggested that Serbia's failures during the Serbo-Turkish War and the secured benevolent neutrality of Austria-Hungary prompted the hesitating Russia to drop Serbia as its proxy in the Balkans in favor of Bulgaria to secure close proximity to the straits of Bosporus and the Dardanelles.

== Status of combatants ==
=== The Ottoman Army ===
The Ottoman army at this time solely conscripted Muslims with non-Muslims paying a poll tax in lieu of service. The army itself was divided into four categories: the Nizam (standing army), who served for four years (five for cavalry and engineers); the Ithiat, or first reserve, where a further two years were served (one year for the cavalry and artillery); the Redif, which took veterans of the Nizam and Ithiat categories and men who did not serve; and the Moustafiz, where all men who had completed their service in the Redif (approximately 300,000 troops) served for a further six years.

The Redif itself was divided into four categories: the first category consisted of veterans of the Nizam category, who served in the first Redif subcategory for four years before entering the second Redif sub-category; men who were not conscripted served in the third sub-category of the Redif for four years before entering the fourth subcategory. The Redif itself was grouped into battalions and classes, with whole battalions taken out to serve as new units. The annual draft conscripted 37,500 men; following mobilisation of the Nizam and Ithiat, these two portions of the army totaled approximately 210,000 men. An additional 20,000 men of the Gendarme were included in the Nizam. The Redif was theoretically capable of providing 190,000–200,000 troops.

Sultan Abdulaziz had reorganised the military school during his reign to educate officers. However, the turnout of this academy was poor and only 1,600 of the 20,000 regular officers of the army were academy trained, though the artillery saw the highest concentration of academy trained officers at 20% of the total. For the entire Ottoman army, only 132 academy-trained generals were available.

The Ottoman army was organised at the battalion level with a battalion nominally holding 800 men subdivided into companies of 100 men, for formations above the battalion level these were to be assembled ad-hoc this results in difficulty at estimating Ottoman troop strength throughout the war as many units were below strength before entering the war due to the many rebellions affecting the empire. However, the Ottoman army was well prepared for war, as it had increasingly called up its reserves up to the third subcategory of the Redif when Russian forces began gathering in Bessarabia. Olender gives the Ottoman battalion (tabor) of infantry at 774 men on paper and 650 in practice, the cavalry squadron containing 143 men on paper and 100 in practice, with the artillery being organised into six gun batteries.

The Ottoman army was also well equipped; 75% of its troops were equipped with Peabody-Martini rifles (accurate to 1,800 yards), with 300,000 of these guns having been purchased prior to the war. The remainder of the regular troops used Snider rifles; the irregulars used Winchester repeating rifles, and the Egyptians used Remington rifles. The Ottoman support services were, however, less impressive, with the army often forced to resort to foraging. On the other hand, Ottoman forces were equipped with entrenching tools (which they used extensively at Plevna) and had sufficient ammunition for their repeating rifles. The Ottoman artillery were armed with Krupp guns of the 8cm and 9cm types for field usage, with 12 cm and 15cm guns also being used (but less commonly) and various older guns found primarily in fortresses.

At the outbreak of war, the Ottoman army was divided into several groups. The largest was the 168,000-man contingent under the command of Abdülkerim Nadir Pasha, based out of Shumla. 140,000 were assigned to the general task of fighting threats in the European provinces of the Empire, with 45,000 in various garrisons in Anatolia, Europe, and Crete. With the Caucasus army containing 70,000 men, the total of number of troops amounted to 378,000.

Olender gives a breakdown of Ottoman troops in the spring of 1877 as containing 571 infantry battalions (181 of which were Nizam), 147 cavalry squadrons and 143 artillery batteries not including the fortress and garrison companies or irregulars. On paper this would amount to 441,954 infantry (140,094 being nizam troops), 21,021 cavalry and 858 guns. However, due to other conflicts and the ongoing process of mobilisation of the Redif units at this process the Regular Ottoman army amounted to 400,000 troops with an additional 90,000 irregular troops and Egyptian troops.

Disposition of Ottoman forces at the outbreak of war
Location	Commander	Formations	Personnel (Paper Olender)
Vidin	Osman Pasha	50 battalions 10 squadrons 15 batteries	30,000 (40,130 men, 90 guns)
Rushchuk Sistova	Kaisserli Ahmed Pasha	15 battalions 4 squadrons 5 batteries	15,000 (12,182, 30 guns)
Silistra	Sulami Pasha	12 battalions 3 squadrons 3 batteries	9,000 (9,717, 18 guns)
Shumla, Targovishte	Ahmed Eyüb Pasha	65 battalions 30 squadrons (mostly irregular) 15 batteries	55,000 (54,600, 90 guns)
Varna	Reshid Pasha	12 battalions 2 squadrons 2 batteries	8,000 (9,288, 12 guns)
Sofia, Tirnovo, Adrianople, Constantinople		45 battalions 12 squadrons 8 batteries	25,000 (36,546, 48 guns)
Bosnia	Süleyman Pasha		15,000
Albania			20,000
Novi Pazar			10,000
Crete and European Ottoman lands			45,000

=== The Russian Army ===
The Russian army in the decade prior to the war underwent major modernisation spearheaded by the Minister of War Dmitry Milyutin; this programme of reform gave Russia a large army that was capable of fighting a war against the Ottomans. All Russian men were to serve 6 years in the active army and 9 years in the reserves though through exemption the effective intake of conscription was considerably less (in 1874 of 724,648 eligible men only 150,000 were enlisted, this having risen to 218,000 by 1877) in peacetime, though this was still sufficient to meet the Russian need for manpower. The active portion of the army was subdivided into 2 portions. The first portion was the local troops, who were garrison soldiers in Europe, regular soldiers in Asia, stationary forces and gendarmes. The other portion was the Field Army. In addition to these forces there was the militia (opolcheniye), which contained all men exempted from conscription and men under 40 who had completed their terms of service.

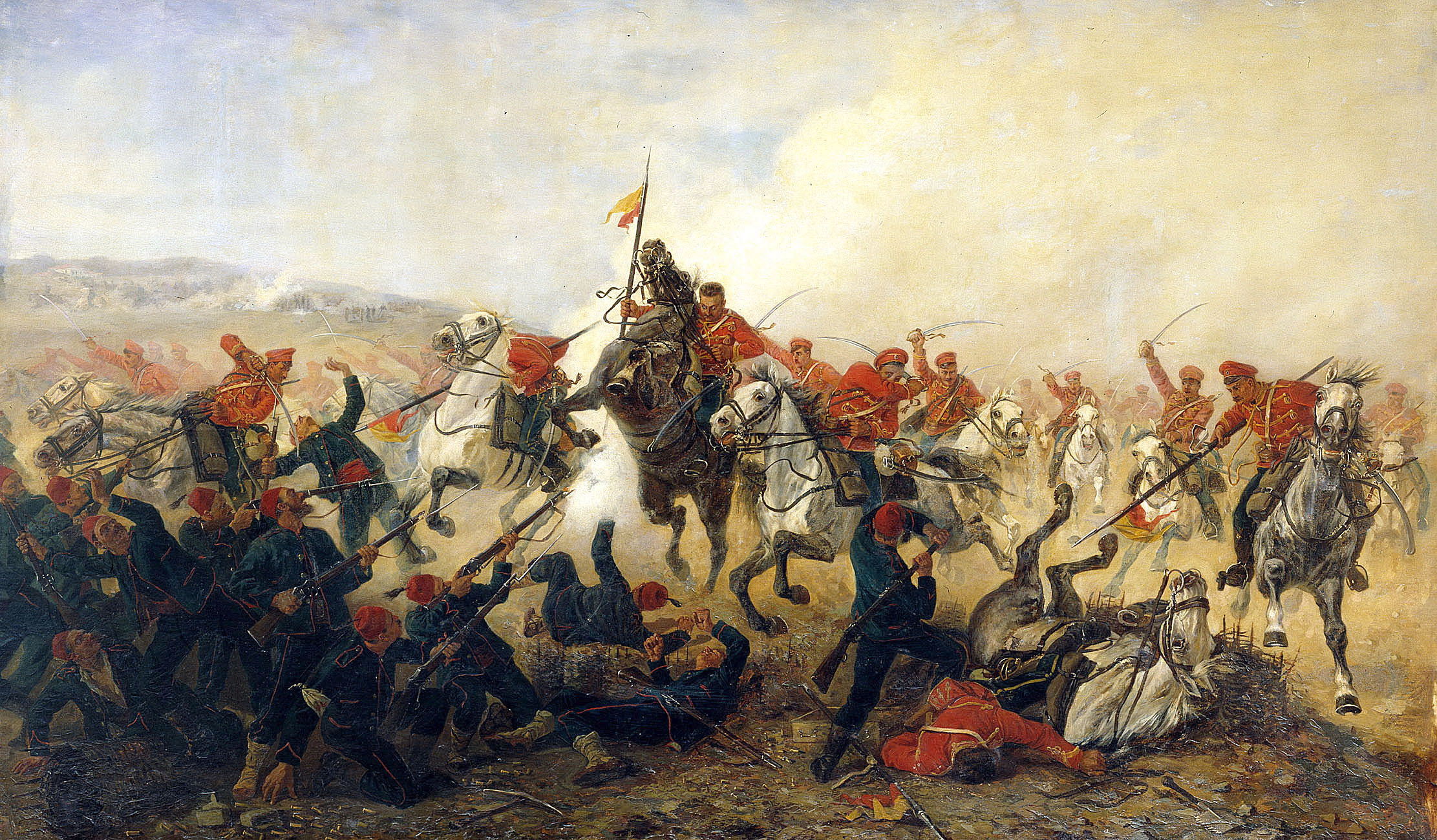
Attack of the Life Guards of the Hussar Regiment near the village of Telish

The Field Army was organised into 48 infantry divisions (3 of which were guard and 4 Grenadier). There were also 8 rifle brigades, 19 cavalry divisions, 35 horse gun batteries, 19 engineer battalions and 49 field gun brigades. The Russian divisions were organised into corps of 2 to 3 divisions, a corps excluding support and command staff would consist of 20,160 infantry, 2,048 cavalry, 96 field guns and 12 horse drawn guns (this is for a 2 division corps).

The Russian army in 1874 contained 754,265 men. By 1 January 1878, this had risen to over 1.5 million men. The Russian army used 2 rifles: the Krnka rifle, which they possessed 800,000 of at the minimum and was accurate to only 600 yards (to the Turkish Peabody's 1,800), and the Berdan rifle, which equipped the Line, Grenadier, Rifle and Guard formations and was accurate to 1,500 yards. However, the Russian army, despite possessing breechloading rifles, was still holding to the maxims of Suvorov, which called for the usage of the bayonet as the principal weapon. Russian soldiers also lacked adequate quantities entrenching equipment. Russian artillery, though breechloaded, was nearing obsolescence

== Course of the war ==
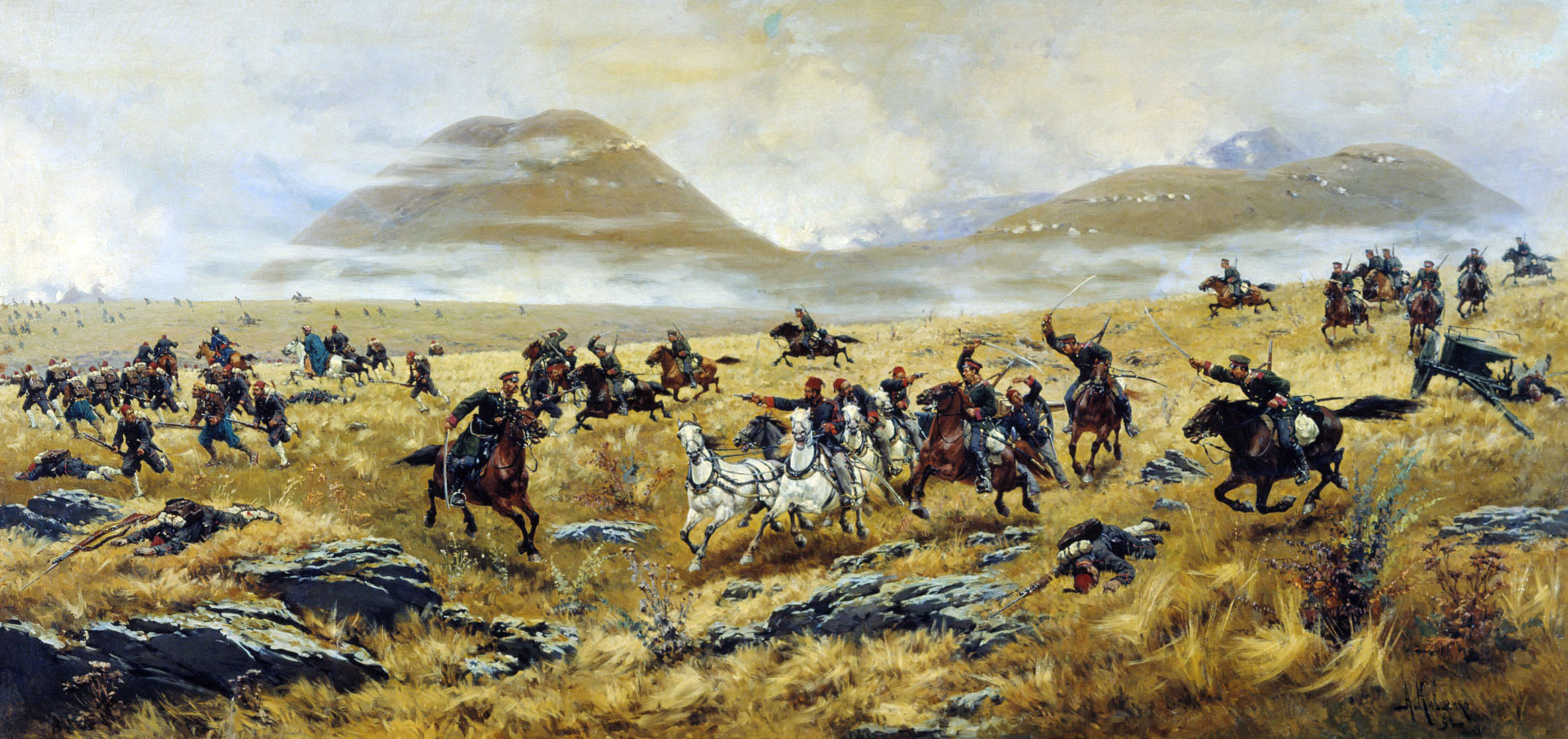
Nizhegorodsky Dragoons pursuing the Turks near Kars, 1877, painting by Aleksey Kivshenko

=== Balkan theatre/Romanian War of Independence ===
In Romania the war is called the Russo-Romanian-Turkish War (1877–1878) or the Romanian War of Independence (1877–1878).

On 12 April 1877, Romania gave permission to the Russian troops to pass through its territory to attack the Turks.

On 24 April 1877 Russia declared war on the Ottomans, and its troops entered Romania through the newly built Eiffel Bridge near Ungheni, on the Prut river, resulting in Turkish bombardments of Romanian towns on the Danube.

On 10 May 1877, the Principality of Romania, which was under nominal Turkish suzerainty, declared its independence.

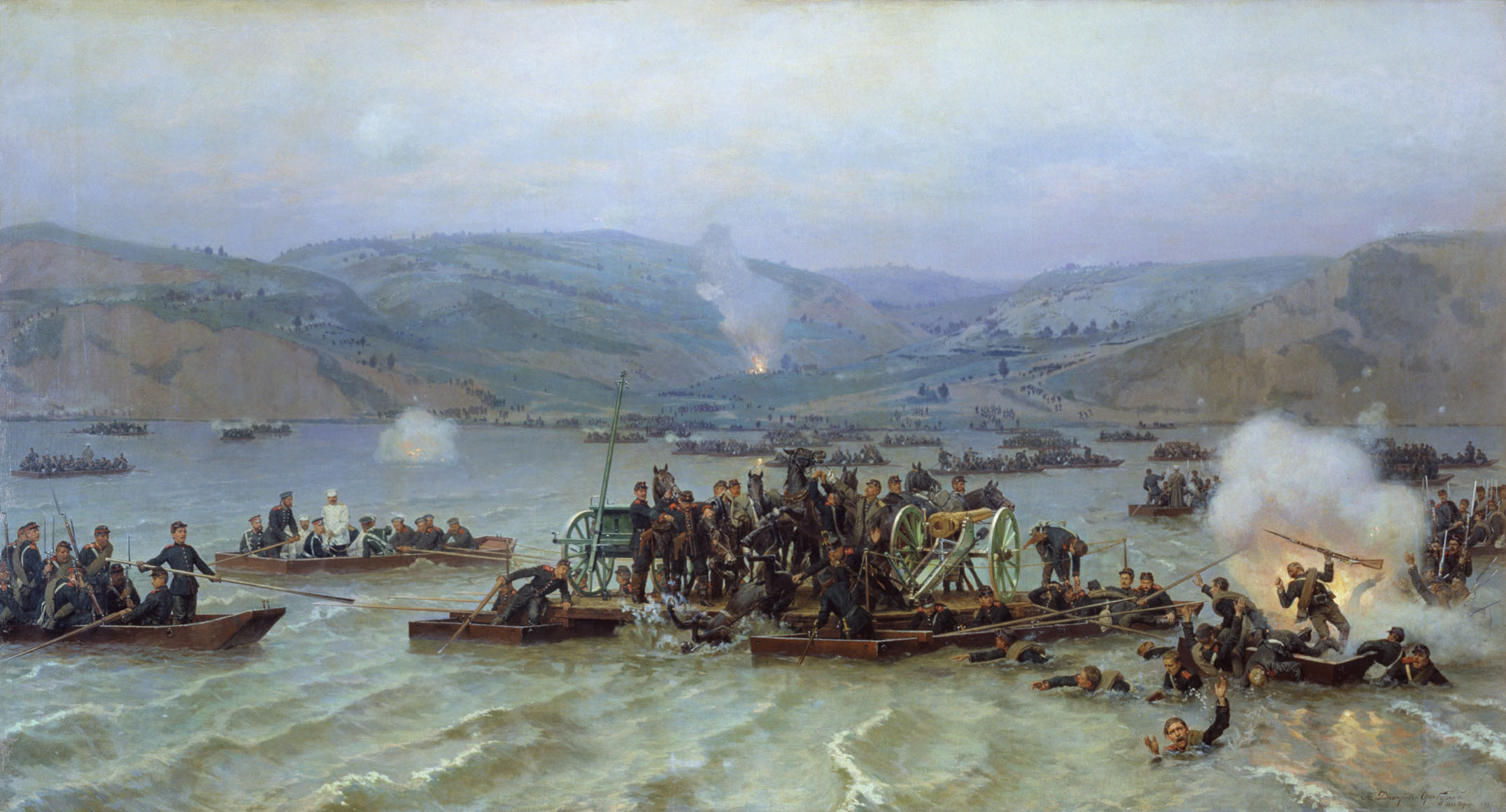
Russian crossing of the Danube, June 1877, painting by Nikolai Dmitriev-Orenburgsky, 1883

At the beginning of the war, the outcome was far from obvious. The Russians could send a larger army into the Balkans: about 300,000 troops were within reach. The Ottomans had about 200,000 troops on the Balkan peninsula, of which about 100,000 were assigned to fortified garrisons, leaving about 100,000 for the army of operation. The Ottomans had the advantage of being fortified, complete command of the Black Sea, and patrol boats along the Danube river. They also possessed superior arms, including new British and American-made rifles and German-made artillery.

In the event, however, the Ottomans usually resorted to passive defense, leaving the strategic initiative to the Russians, who, after making some mistakes, found a winning strategy for the war. The Ottoman military command in Constantinople made poor assumptions about Russian intentions. They decided that Russians would be too lazy to march along the Danube and cross it away from the delta, and would prefer the short way along the Black Sea coast. This would be ignoring the fact that the coast had the strongest, best supplied and garrisoned Turkish fortresses. There was only one well manned fortress along the inner part of the River Danube, Vidin. It was garrisoned only because the troops, led by Osman Nuri Pasha, had just taken part in defeating the Serbs in their recent war against the Ottoman Empire.

The Russian campaign was better planned, but it relied heavily on Turkish passivity. A crucial Russian mistake was sending too few troops initially; an expeditionary force of about 185,000 crossed the Danube in June, slightly fewer than the combined Turkish forces in the Balkans (about 200,000). After setbacks in July (at Pleven and Stara Zagora), the Russian military command realized it did not have the reserves to keep the offensive going and switched to a defensive posture. The Russians did not even have enough forces to blockade Pleven properly until late August, which effectively delayed the whole campaign for about two months.

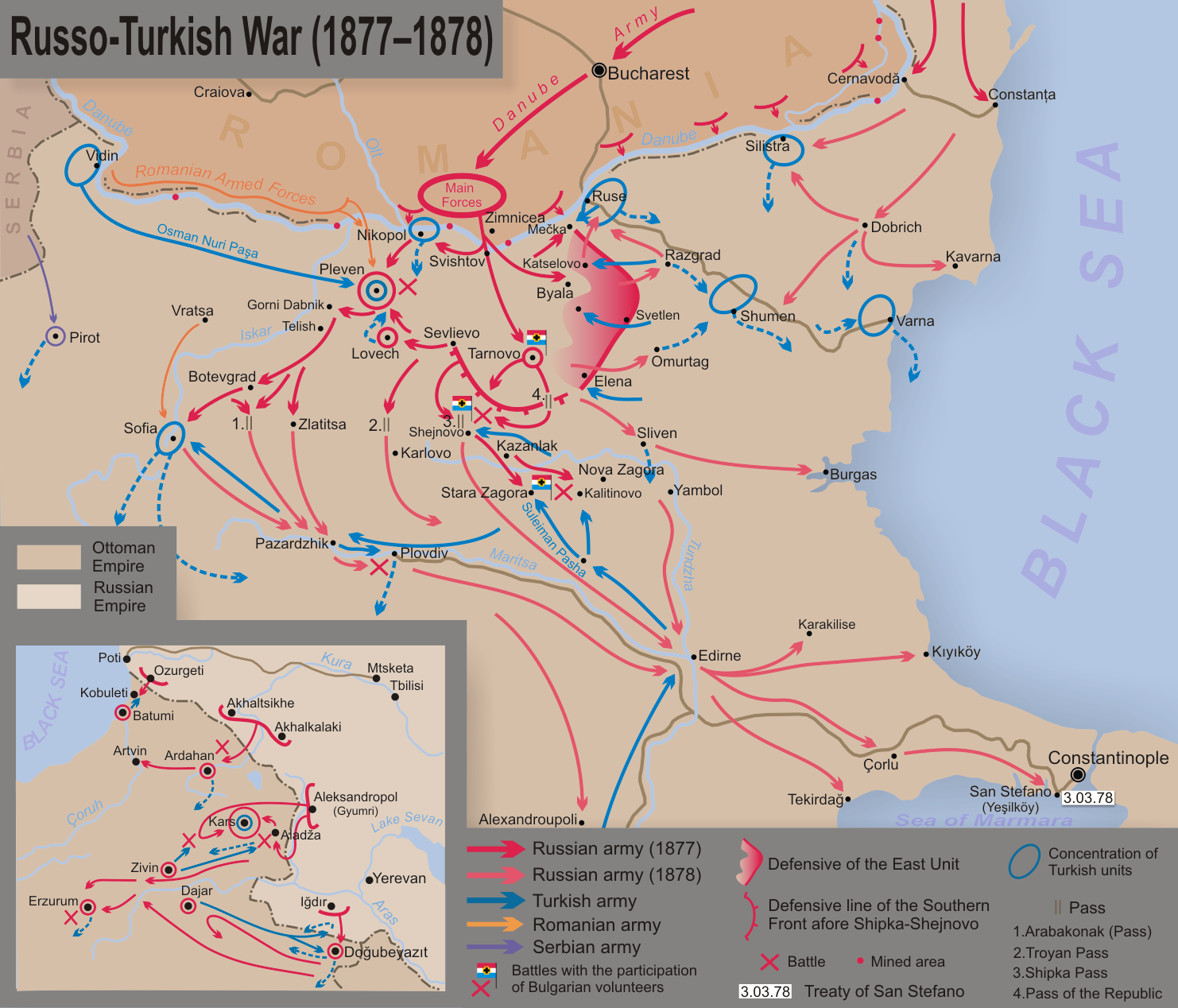
Map of the Balkan Theater

At the start of the war, Russia and Romania destroyed all vessels along the Danube and mined the river, thus ensuring that Russian forces could cross the Danube at any point without resistance from the Ottoman Navy. The Ottoman command did not appreciate the significance of the Russians' actions. In June, a small Russian unit crossed the Danube close to the delta, at Galați, and marched towards Ruschuk (today Ruse). This made the Ottomans even more confident that the big Russian force would come right through the middle of the Ottoman stronghold.

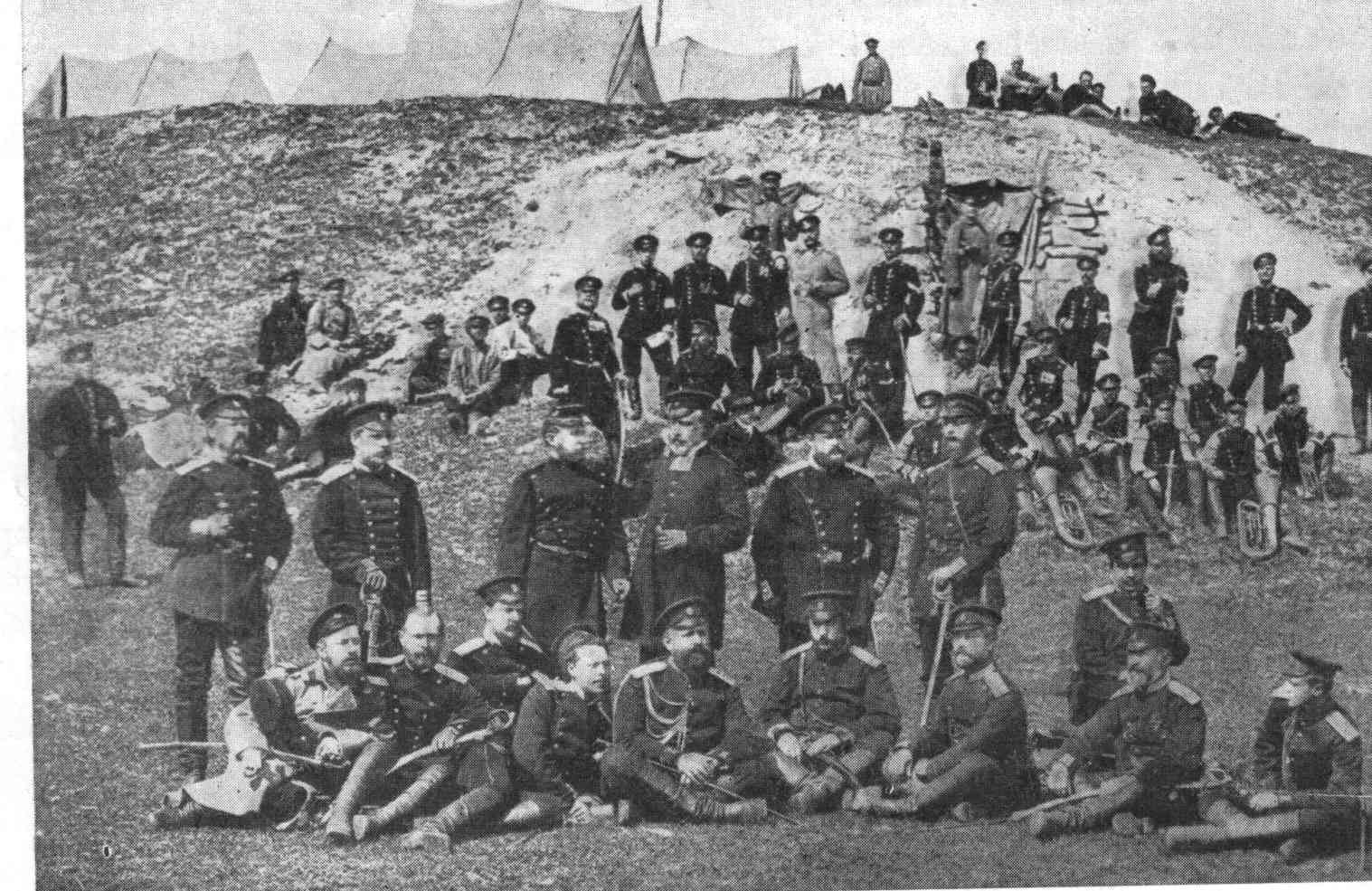
Soldiers of Finnish Guard sharpshooter battalion during Battle of Gorni Dubnik

In the first month of the war, the Ottomans suffered a pair of significant naval losses on the Danube. The turret ship Lütf-ü Celil was destroyed by a Russian artillery battery on 11 May. And on the night of 25–26 May, a Romanian torpedo boat with a mixed Romanian-Russian crew attacked and sank the Ottoman monitor Seyfî on the Danube. Under the direct command of Major-General Mikhail Ivanovich Dragomirov, on the night of 27/28 June 1877 (NS) the Russians constructed a pontoon bridge across the Danube at Svishtov. After a short battle in which the Russians suffered 812 killed and wounded, the Russians secured the opposing bank and drove off the Ottoman infantry brigade defending Svishtov. At this point the Russian force was divided into three parts: the Eastern Detachment under the command of Tsarevich Alexander Alexandrovich, the future Tsar Alexander III of Russia, assigned to capture the fortress of Ruschuk and cover the army's eastern flank; the Western Detachment, to capture the fortress of Nikopol, Bulgaria and cover the army's western flank; and the Advance Detachment under Count Joseph Vladimirovich Gourko, which was assigned to quickly move via Veliko Tarnovo and penetrate the Balkan Mountains, the most significant barrier between the Danube and Constantinople.

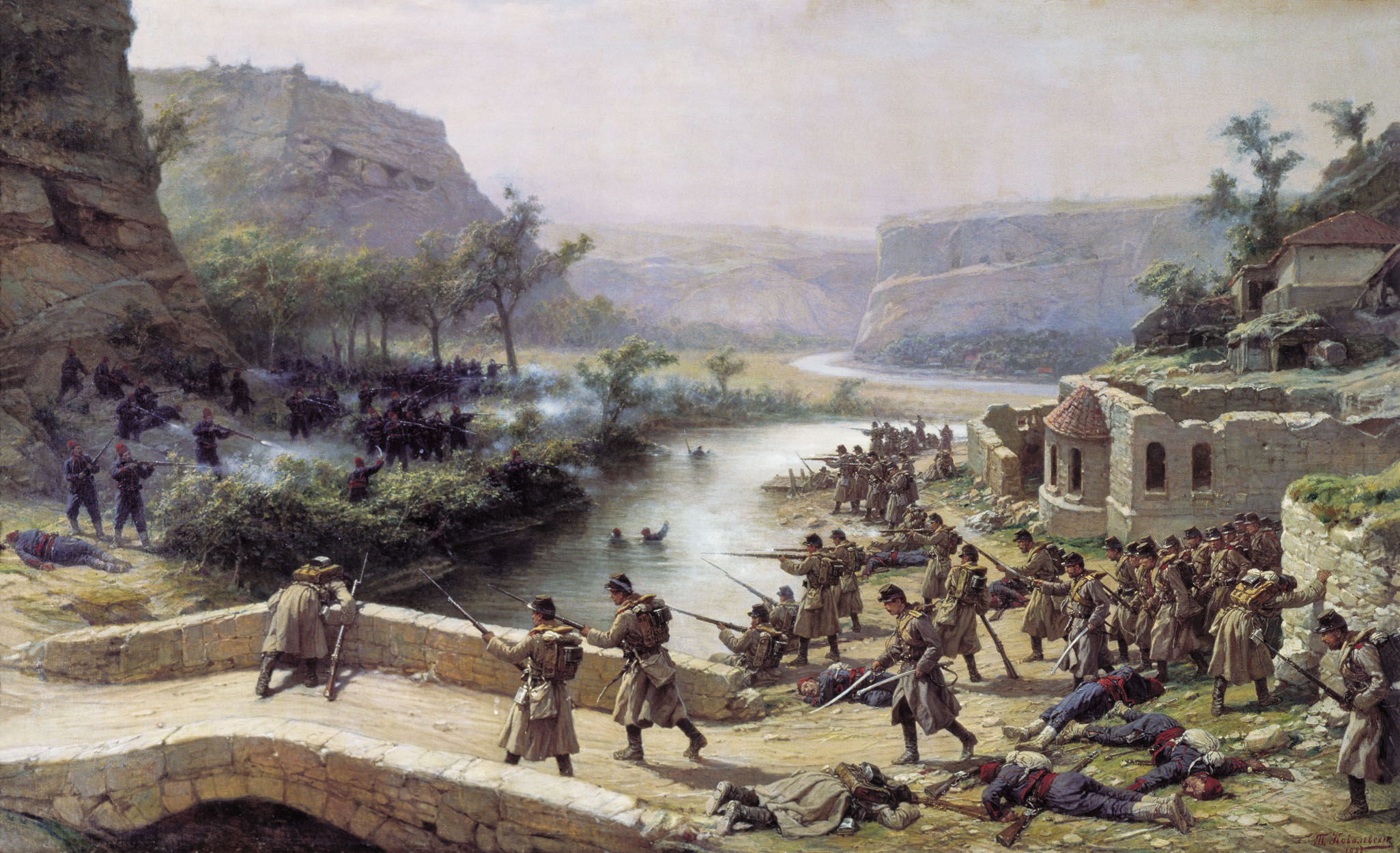
Fighting near Ivanovo-Chiflik

Responding to the Russian crossing of the Danube, the Ottoman high command in Constantinople ordered Osman Nuri Pasha to advance east from Vidin and occupy the fortress of Nikopol, just west of the Russian crossing. On his way to Nikopol, Osman Pasha learned that the Russians had already captured the fortress and so moved to the crossroads town of Plevna (now known as Pleven), which he occupied with a force of approximately 15,000 on 19 July (NS). The Russians, approximately 9,000 under the command of General Schilder-Schuldner, reached Plevna early in the morning. Thus began the Siege of Plevna, lasting for 145 days until 10 December.

Osman Pasha organized a defense and repelled two Russian attacks with colossal casualties on the Russian side. At that point, the sides were almost equal in numbers and the Russian army was very discouraged. A counter-attack might have allowed the Ottomans to control and destroy the Russians' bridge, but Osman Pasha did not leave the fortress because he had orders to stay fortified in Plevna.

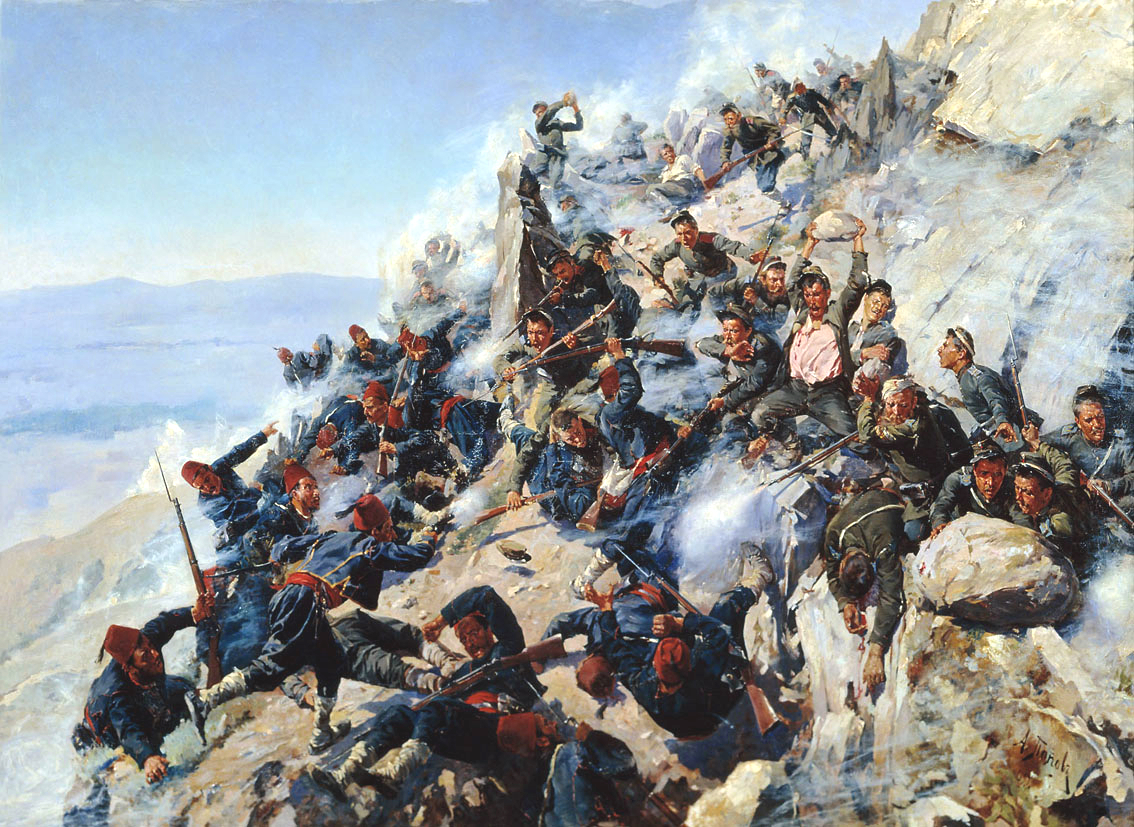
Russian troops and Bulgarian volunteers fighting off the Ottoman Army during the Battle of Shipka Pass in August 1877

Russia had no more troops to throw against Plevna, so the Russians besieged it, and subsequently asked the Romanians to cross the Danube and help them. On 9 August, Suleiman Pasha made an attempt to help Osman Pasha with 30,000 troops, but he was stopped by Bulgarians at the Battle of Shipka Pass. After three days of fighting, the volunteers were relieved by a Russian force led by General Fyodor Radetsky, and the Turkish forces withdrew. Soon afterwards, Romanian forces crossed the Danube and joined the siege. On 16 August, at Gorni-Studen, the armies around Plevna were placed under the command of the Romanian Prince Carol I, aided by the Russian general Pavel Dmitrievich Zotov and the Romanian general Alexandru Cernat.

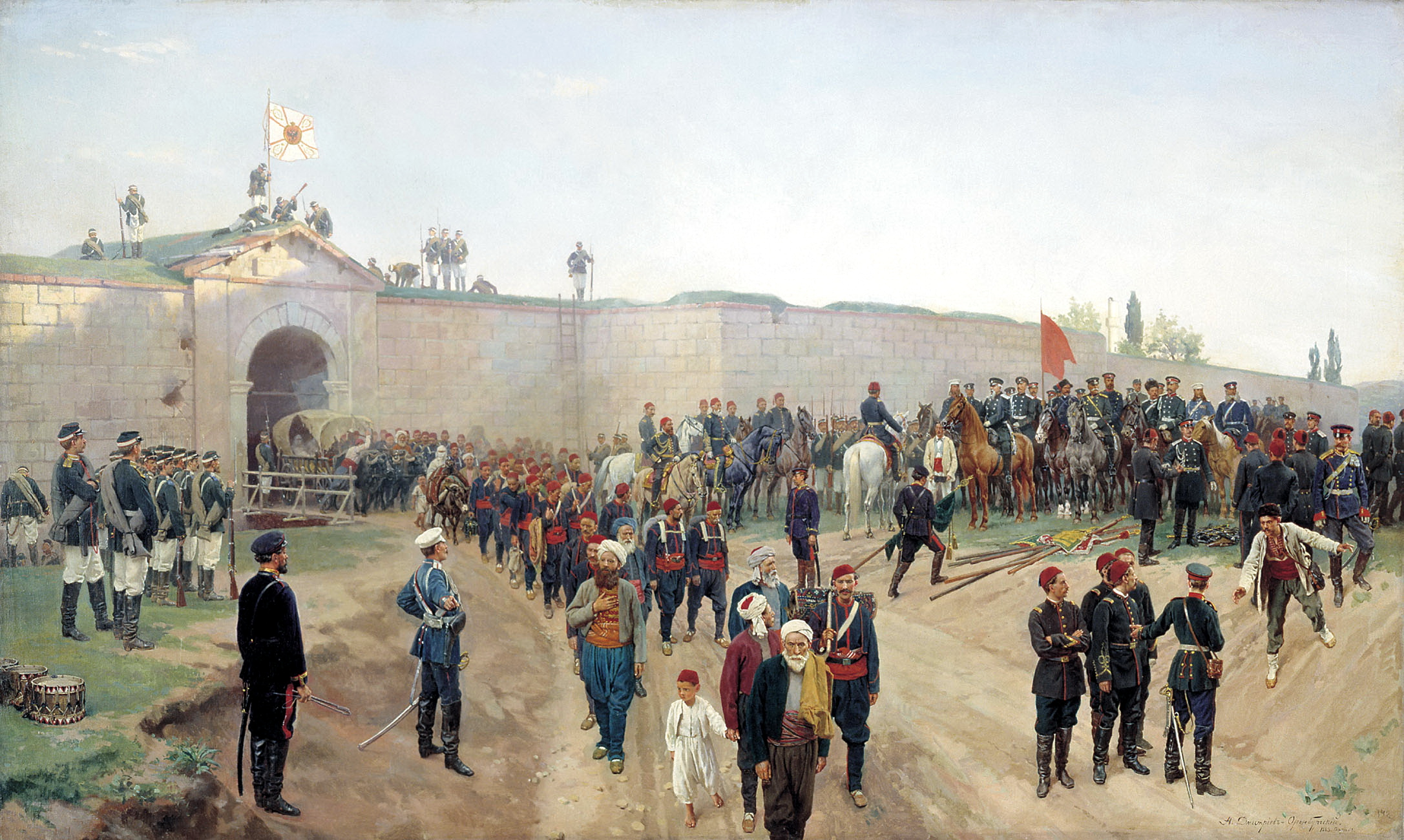
The Ottoman capitulation at Niğbolu (Nicopolis, modern Nikopol) in 1877 was significant, as it was the site of an important Ottoman victory in 1396 which marked the expansion of the Ottoman Empire into the Balkans.

The Turks maintained several fortresses around Pleven which the Russian and Romanian forces gradually reduced. The Romanian 4th Division led by General Gheorghe Manu took the Grivitsa redoubt after four bloody assaults and managed to keep it until the very end of the siege. Rahova (Oryahovo) was captured by a coalition of Russian and Romanian forces led by Colonel Gheorghe Slăniceanu and Major General Feofil Egorovich Meyendorf in November. The Siege of Plevna (July–December 1877) turned to victory only after Russian and Romanian forces cut off all supply routes to the fortified Ottomans. With supplies running low, Osman Pasha made an attempt to break the Russian siege in the direction of Opanets. On 9 December, in the middle of the night the Ottomans threw bridges over the Vit river and crossed it, attacked on a 2-mile (3.2 km) front and broke through the first line of Russian trenches. Here they fought hand to hand and bayonet to bayonet, with little advantage to either side. Outnumbering the Ottomans almost 5 to 1, the Russians drove the Ottomans back across the Vit. Osman Pasha was wounded in the leg by a stray bullet, which killed his horse beneath him. Making a brief stand, the Ottomans eventually found themselves driven back into the city, losing 5,000 men to the Russians' 2,000. The next day, Osman surrendered the city, the garrison, and his sword to the Romanian colonel, Mihail Cerchez. He was treated honorably, but his troops perished in the snow by the thousands as they straggled off into captivity.

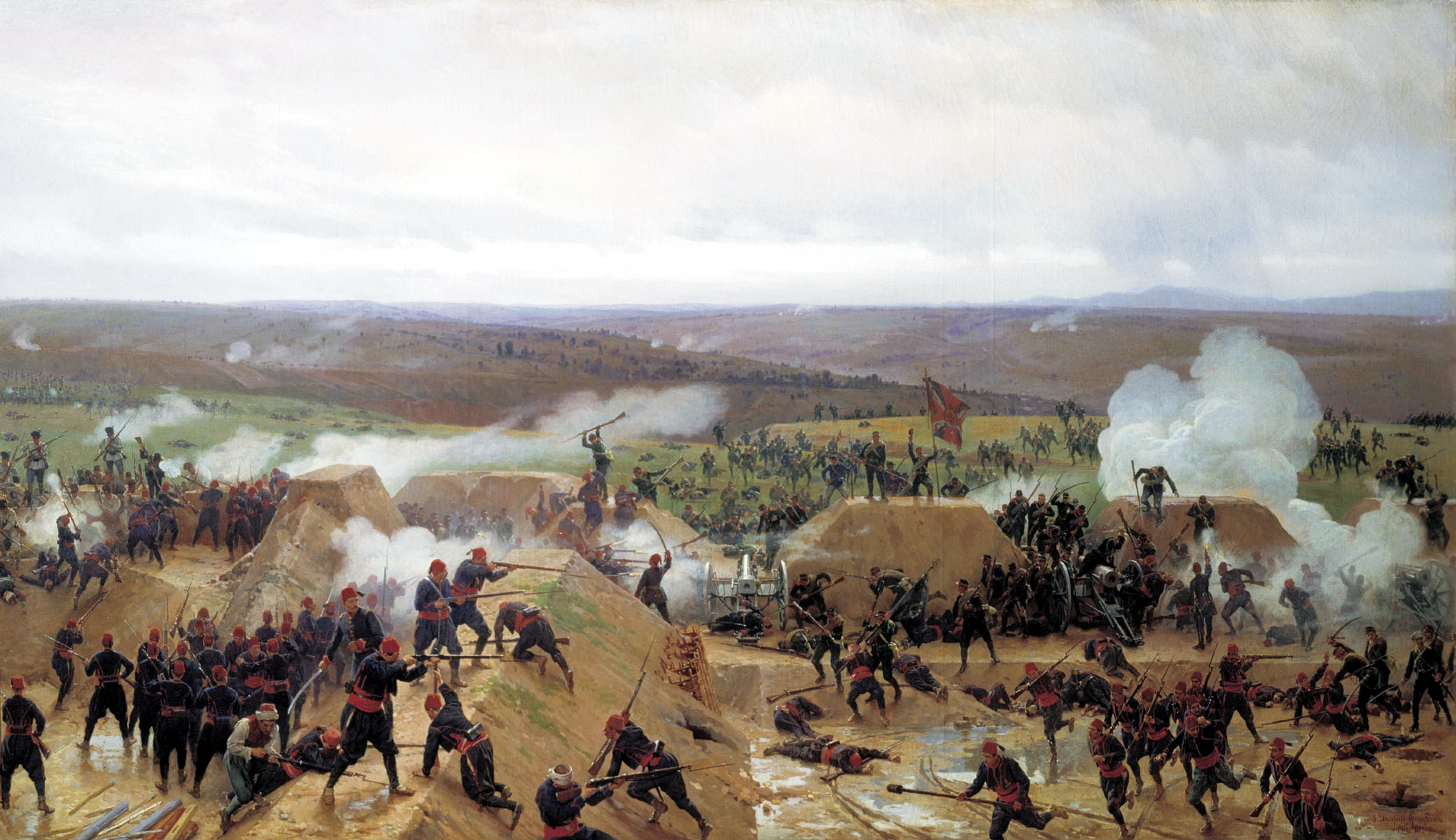
Taking of the Grivitsa redoubt by the Russians – a few hours later the redoubt was recaptured by the Ottomans and fell to the Romanians on 30 August 1877, in what became known as the "Third Battle of Grivitsa".

At this point, Serbia, having finally secured monetary aid from Russia, declared war on the Ottoman Empire again. This time there were far fewer Russian officers in the Serbian army but this was more than offset by the experience gained from the 1876–77 war. Under nominal command of Prince Milan Obrenović (effective command was in hands of general Kosta Protić, the army chief of staff), the Serbian Army went on offensive in what is now eastern south Serbia. A planned offensive into the Ottoman Sanjak of Novi Pazar was called off due to strong diplomatic pressure from Austria-Hungary, which wanted to prevent Serbia and Montenegro from coming into contact, and which had designs to spread Austria-Hungary's influence through the area. The Ottomans, outnumbered unlike two years before, mostly confined themselves to passive defence of fortified positions. By the end of hostilities the Serbs had captured Ak-Palanka (today Bela Palanka), Pirot, Niš and Vranje.

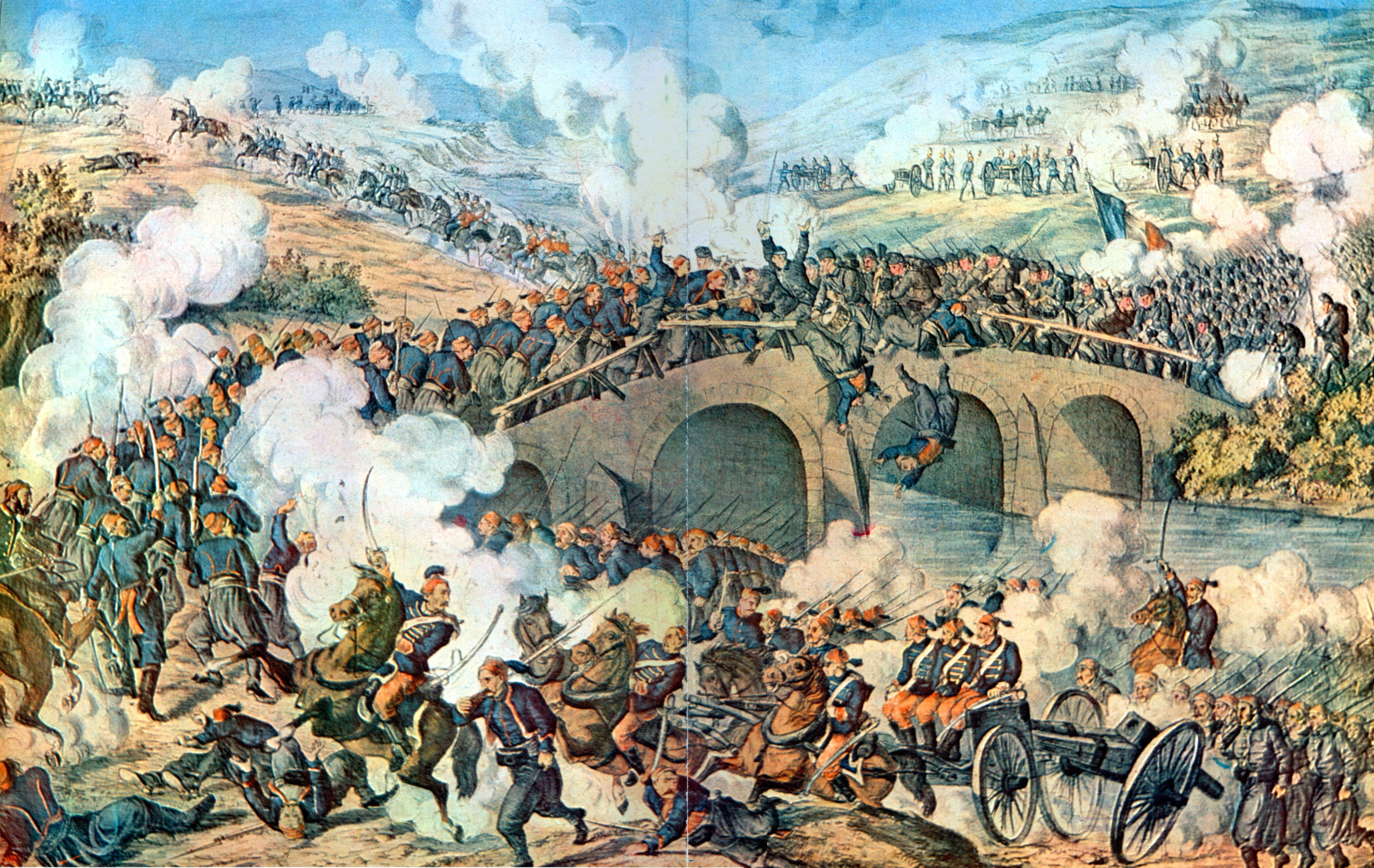
Clash between Romanians and Turks in the Battle at bridge Skit, November 1877

Russians under Field Marshal Gourko succeeded in capturing the passes at the Stara Planina mountain, which were crucial for maneuvering. Next, both sides fought a series of battles for Shipka Pass. Gourko made several attacks on the Pass and eventually secured it. Ottoman troops spent much effort to recapture this important route, to use it to reinforce Osman Pasha in Pleven, but failed. Eventually Gourko led a final offensive that crushed the Ottomans around Shipka Pass. The Ottoman offensive against Shipka Pass is considered one of the major mistakes of the war, as other passes were virtually unguarded. At this time a huge number of Ottoman troops stayed fortified along the Black Sea coast and engaged in very few operations.

A Russian army crossed the Stara Planina by a high snowy pass in winter, guided and helped by local Bulgarians, not expected by the Ottoman army, and defeated the Turks at the Battle of Tashkessen and took Sofia. The way was now open for a quick advance through Plovdiv and Adrianople to Constantinople.

Besides the Romanian Army (which mobilized around 114,000 soldiers), more than 12,000 volunteer Bulgarian troops (Opalchenie) from the local Bulgarian population as well as many hajduk detachments fought in the war on the side of the Russians.

=== Caucasian theatre ===
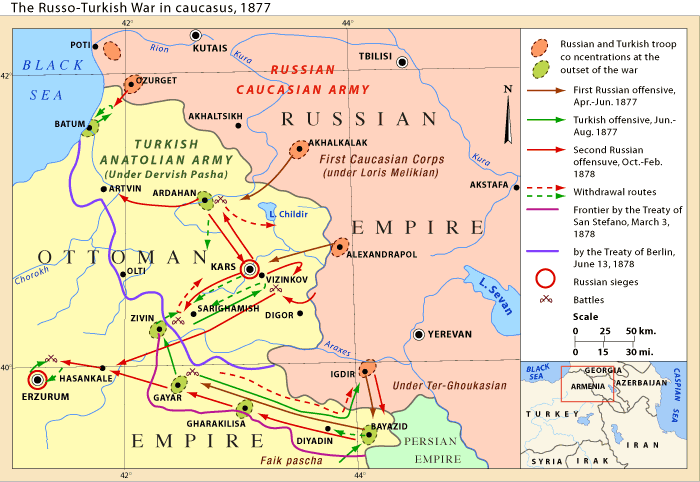
The Russo-Turkish War in Caucasia, 1877

The Russian 1st Caucasus Army Corps was stationed in Georgia and Armenia, composed of approximately 50,000 men and 202 guns under the overall command of Grand Duke Michael Nikolaevich, Governor General of the Caucasus. The Russian force stood opposed by an Ottoman Army of 100,000 men led by General Ahmed Muhtar Pasha. While the Russian army was better prepared for the fighting in the region, it lagged behind technologically in certain areas such as heavy artillery and was outgunned, for example, by the superior long-range Krupp artillery that Germany had supplied to the Ottomans.

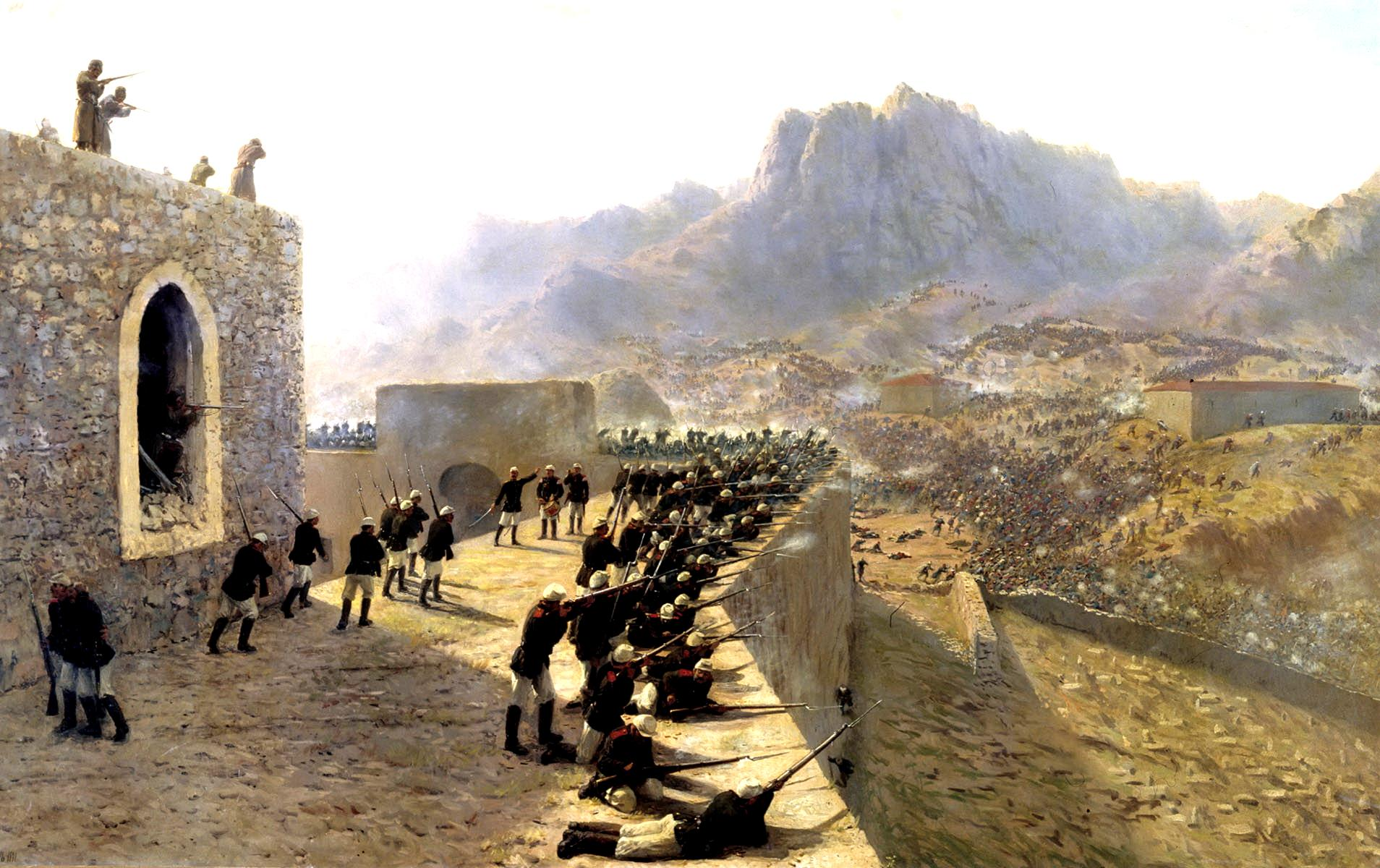
Russian troops repulsing the Turkish assault at Beyazid on June 8, 1877. A few days later, General Arshak Ter-Gukasov relieved Russian defenses.

The Caucasus Corps was led by a quartet of Armenian commanders: Generals Mikhail Loris-Melikov, Arshak Ter-Gukasov (Ter-Ghukasov/Ter-Ghukasyan), Ivan Lazarev and Beybut Shelkovnikov. Forces under Lieutenant-General Ter-Gukasov, stationed near Yerevan, commenced the first assault into Ottoman territory by capturing the town of Bayazid on 27 April 1877. Capitalizing on Ter-Gukasov's victory there, Russian forces advanced, taking the region of Ardahan on 17 May; Russian units also besieged the city of Kars in the final week of May, although Ottoman reinforcements lifted the siege and drove them back. Bolstered by reinforcements, in November 1877 General Lazarev launched a new attack on Kars, suppressing the southern forts leading to the city and capturing Kars itself on 18 November. On 19 February 1878, the strategic fortress town of Erzurum was taken by the Russians after a lengthy siege. Although they relinquished control of Erzurum to the Ottomans at the end the war, the Russians acquired the regions of Batum, Ardahan, Kars, Olti, and Sarikamish and reconstituted them into the Kars Oblast.

=== Greek involvement ===
During the course of the war, the majority of Greeks wanted to enter the war on Russia's side, however the Greek government decided reluctantly to not intervene, due to British neutrality. The British guaranteed that after the end of the war they would intervene themselves and assure equal rights for the Greek subjects of the Ottoman Empire, as long as Greece didn't join the war. Nevertheless, several Greek revolts broke out in Crete, Epirus, Macedonia and Thessaly demanding union with Greece. The Greeks of Armenia also joined the struggle in the Caucasus. The Greek Army, led by Skarlatos Soutsos, invaded Thessaly in January 1878 with 25,000 troops, but didn't officially declare war on the Ottomans; along with Greek irregular revolutionaries, the Greek Army won the Battle of Mouzaki.

However, the Great Powers asked for Greece to recall its army, in return, they ensured that issues regarding the Greek communities would be raised in the post-war Peace Conference. The Greek government accepted and, as a result, the rebellions were left unsupported and were crushed by the Ottomans. Three years later, with the Convention of Constantinople, most of Thessaly (excluding Elassona) as well as Arta were ceded to Greece.

=== Kurdish uprising ===
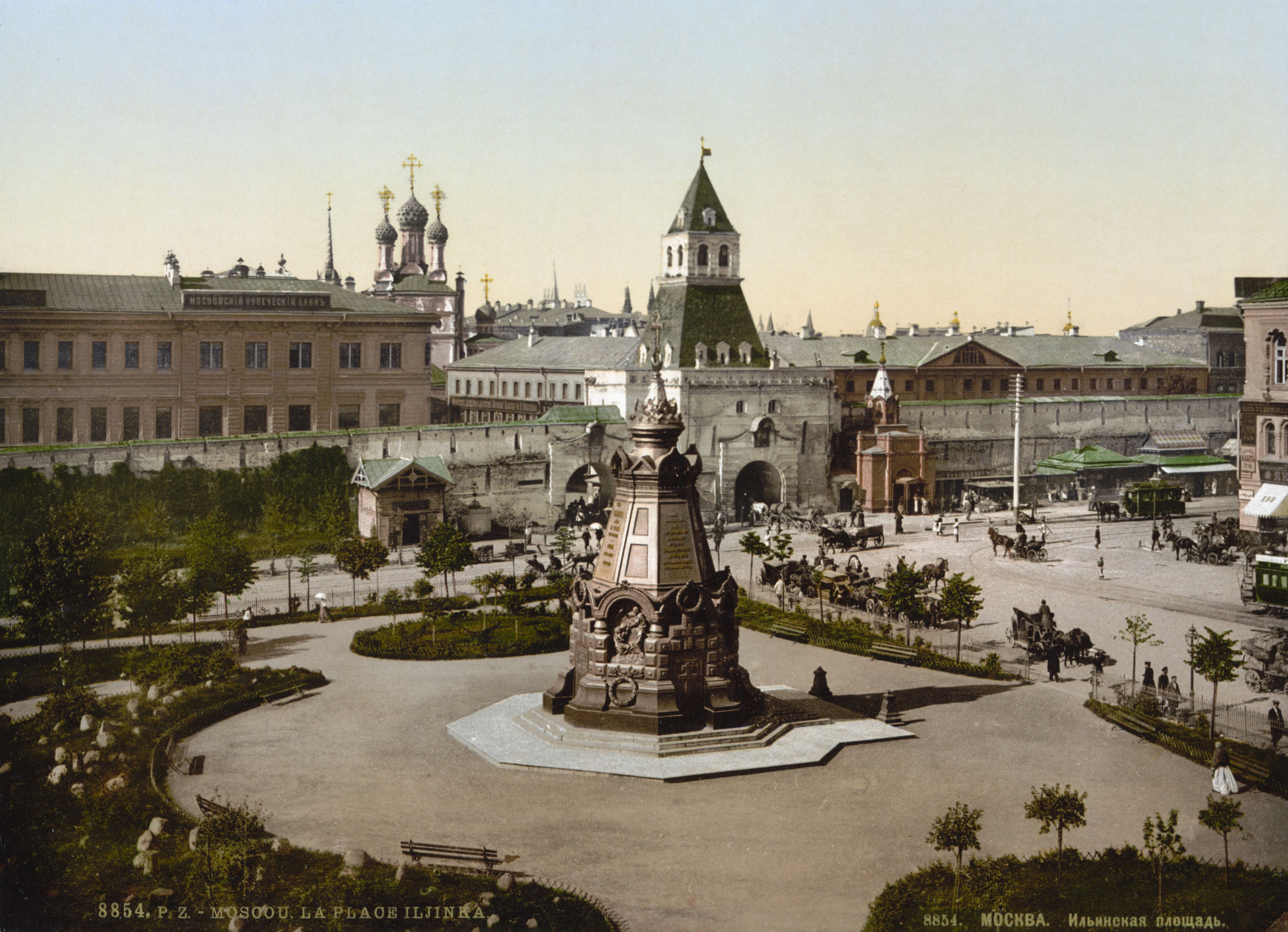
Plevna Chapel near the walls of Kitay-gorod

As the Russo-Turkish War came to a close, a Kurdish uprising broke out in the Bohtan region, led by the brothers Osman Pasha Bedirkhan and Hüseyin Kenan Pasha. Taking advantage of Ottoman weakness, the rebels gained control over parts of the region for several months. After initial military efforts failed to fully suppress the revolt, the Ottoman authorities combined military pressure with negotiation, eventually securing the surrender of the leaders and ending the rebellion. In Kars, Kurdish notables like Abdürrezzak Bedir Khan and a son of Sheikh Ubeydullah were supporters of the Russians.

=== Civilian government in Bulgaria during the war ===
After Bulgarian territories were liberated by the Russian Army during the war, they were governed initially by a provisional Russian administration, which was established in April 1877. The Treaty of Berlin (1878) provided for the termination of this provisional Russian administration in May 1879, when the Principality of Bulgaria and Eastern Rumelia were established. The main objectives of the temporary Russian administration were to secure peace and order and to prepare for a revival of the Bulgarian state.

== Aftermath ==
=== Intervention by the Great Powers ===
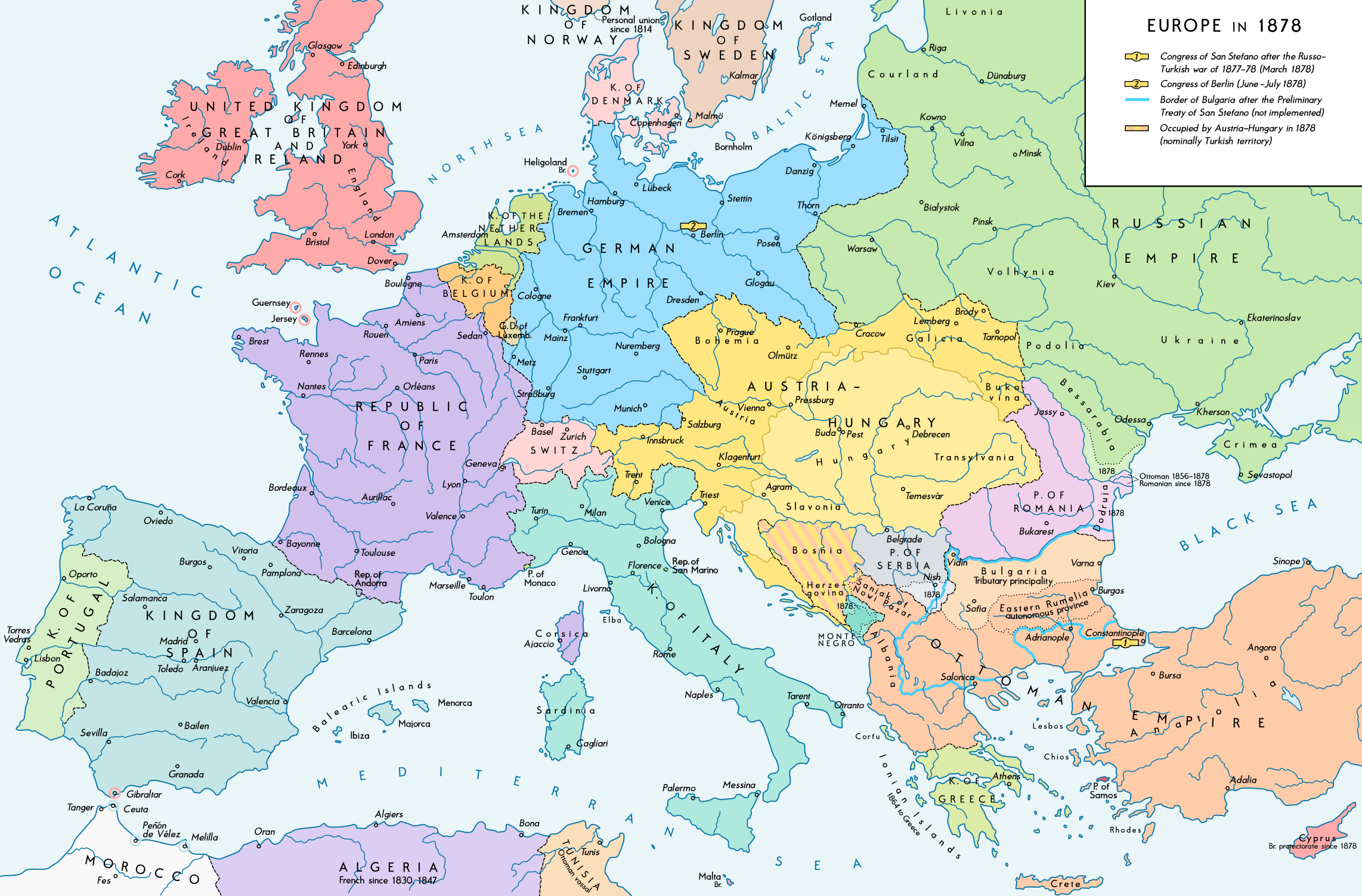
Europe after the Congress of Berlin in 1878 and the territorial and political rearrangement of the Balkan Peninsula.

Under pressure from the British, Russia accepted the truce offered by the Ottoman Empire on 31 January 1878, but continued to move towards Constantinople.

The British sent a fleet of battleships to intimidate Russia from entering the city, and Russian forces stopped at San Stefano. Eventually Russia entered into a settlement under the Treaty of San Stefano on 3 March, by which the Ottoman Empire would recognize the independence of Romania, Serbia, and Montenegro, and the autonomy of Bulgaria.

Alarmed by the extension of Russian power into the Balkans through its new proxy Bulgaria, and its close proximity to the straits of Bosporus and the Dardanelles after the preliminary Treaty of San Stefano, the Great Powers later forced modifications of the treaty in the Congress of Berlin. The main change here was that Bulgaria would be split according to earlier agreements among the Great Powers that precluded the creation of a large new Slavic state: the northern part to become a principality (Bulgaria) and the southern - an autonomous province (Eastern Rumelia), though with different governing bodies; and the Macedonian region, originally part of Bulgaria under San Stefano, would return to direct Ottoman administration.

The 1879 Treaty of Constantinople was a further continuation of negotiations between Russia and the Ottoman Empire. While reaffirming provisions of the Treaty of San Stefano which had not been modified by the Treaty of Berlin, it set compensation terms owed by Ottoman Empire to Russia for losses sustained during the war. It contained terms to release prisoners of war and to grant amnesty to Ottoman subjects, as well as providing terms for the inhabitants nationality after the annexations. Article VII allowed subjects to opt within six months of the signing of the treaty to retain Ottoman subjecthood or become Russian subjects.

A surprising consequence came in Hungary (part of the Austro-Hungarian Empire). Despite memories of the terrible defeat at Mohács in 1526, elite Hungarian attitudes were becoming strongly anti-Russian. This led to active support for the Turks in the media, but only in a peaceful way, since the foreign policy of the Austro-Hungarian monarchy remained neutral.

=== Effects on Bulgaria's Jewish population ===
The Bulletins de l'Alliance Israélite Universelle reported that thousands of Bulgarian Jews found refuge at Constantinople and reported that many Jewish communities had fled in their entirety with the retreating Turks as their protectors.

However, this is directly contradicted by census figures, which, instead of a decrease, indicate a substantial increase in Bulgaria's Jewish population before and after the war. While there were only 4,595 males or 9,190 male and female Jews in the five vilayets to form the future Principality of Bulgaria – Rusçuk, Vidin, Sofia, Tirnova, and Varna – according to the pre-war Ottoman salname of 1875 (0.4% of the population), the 1880 Bulgarian census indicated a total of 14,342 Jews, who accounted for 0.7% of the post-war Bulgarian population. Moreover, an increase by 5,152 people, or 56%, in less than five years, cannot be explained by natural increase alone and would rather indicate substantial net immigration rather than emigration of Jews from the principality. Obviously, any such immigration or return of refugees would happen only after the postwar situation stabilized, offering necessary personal and economic security.

=== Turkey blocks Jews from moving to Palestine area ===
As a result of Bulgarian independence, Turkey was worried that Russian Jews moving to Palestine would work with Russia for independence. Hence they blocked Jews who wanted to emigrate. This caught Jews seeking to leave Russia and Ukraine by surprise - as the numbers applying for visas to enter Palestine was increasing. The following notice was posted outside the Consul-General's office in Odessa on 28 April 1882:

The Ottoman Government informs all Jews wishing to immigrate into Turkey that they are not permitted to settle in Palestine. They may immigrate into the other provinces of the Empire and settle as they wish, provided only that they become Ottoman subjects and accept the obligation to fulfil the laws of the Empire.

=== Internationalization of the Armenian Question ===
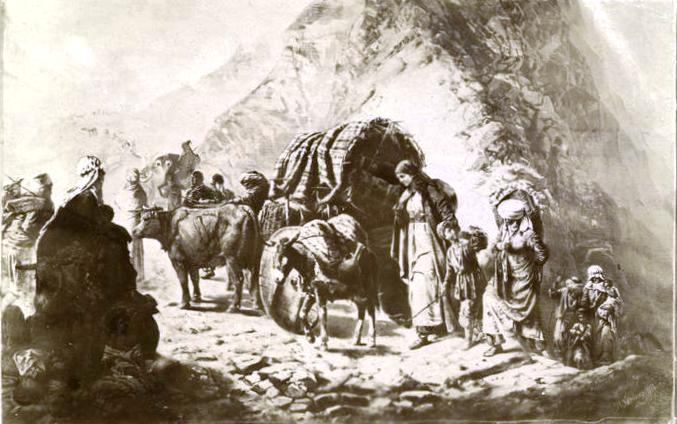
Emigration of Armenians into Georgia during the Russo-Turkish war

The conclusion of the Russo-Turkish war also led to the internationalization of the Armenian question. Many Armenians in the eastern provinces (Turkish Armenia) of the Ottoman Empire greeted the advancing Russians as liberators. Violence and instability directed at Armenians during the war by Kurd and Circassian bands had left many Armenians looking toward the invading Russians as the ultimate guarantors of their security. Influential pro-Russian Armenian thinker Grigor Artsruni encouraged Armenians to migrate to Russia in order to form a more concentrated block. In January 1878, Armenian Patriarch of Constantinople Nerses II Varzhapetian approached the Russian leadership with the view of receiving assurances that the Russians would introduce provisions in the prospective peace treaty for self-administration in the Armenian provinces. Though not as explicit, Article 16 of the Treaty of San Stefano read:

As the evacuation of the Russian troops of the territory they occupy in Armenia, and which is to be restored to Turkey, might give rise to conflicts and complications detrimental to the maintenance of good relations between the two countries, the Sublime Porte engaged to carry into effect, without further delay, the improvements and reforms demanded by local requirements in the provinces inhabited by Armenians and to guarantee their security from Kurds and Circassians.

The Armenian Patriarch discouraged Armenian migration to Russia and encouraged Armenians to "remain faithful to the Sultan". The Patriarch held the belief that Armenian-inhabited areas could remain under Ottoman rule, but under Christian control, and that Muslims who were dissatisfied with how the Ottomans had been governing the provinces would tolerate life under Christian leadership. In attempting to persuade the British to drive a hard bargain with the Ottoman Empire, he asserted to British Ambassador Austen Henry Layard that the "only thing … that could induce the Armenians to refrain from listening to the advice of Russia to emigrate, and to be content to remain under the rule of the Sultan, would be the appointment of an Armenian as Vali of Armenia". Great Britain, however, took objection to Russia holding on to so much Ottoman territory and forced it to enter into new negotiations by convening the Congress of Berlin in June 1878. An Armenian delegation led by prelate Mkrtich Khrimian traveled to Berlin to present the case of the Armenians but, much to its chagrin, was left out of the negotiations. Article 16 was modified and watered down, and all mention of the Russian forces remaining in the provinces was removed. In the final text of the Treaty of Berlin, it was transformed into Article 61, which read:

The Sublime Porte undertakes to carry out, without further delay, the improvements and reforms demanded by local requirements in the provinces inhabited by Armenians, and to guarantee their security against the Circassians and Kurds. It will periodically make known the steps taken to this effect to the powers, who will superintend their application.

As it turned out, the reforms were not forthcoming. Khrimian returned to Constantinople and delivered a famous speech in which he likened the peace conference to a "'big cauldron of Liberty Stew' into which the big nations dipped their 'iron ladles' for real results, while the Armenian delegation had only a 'Paper Ladle'. 'Ah dear Armenian people,' Khrimian said, 'could I have dipped my Paper Ladle in the cauldron it would sog and remain there! Where guns talk and sabers shine, what significance do appeals and petitions have?'" Given the absence of tangible improvements in the plight of the Armenian community, a number of Armenian intellectuals living in Europe and Russia in the 1880s and 1890s formed political parties and revolutionary societies to secure better conditions for their compatriots in Ottoman Armenia and other parts of the Ottoman Empire.

== Civilian casualties ==
=== Atrocities and ethnic cleansing ===
Russia, Bulgaria, Serbia, the Ottoman Empire and Albanians all carried out massacres and pursued an ethnic cleansing policy during the war. On the other hand, Greece and Montenegro committed no atrocities.

==== Russia and Bulgaria against Muslims ====
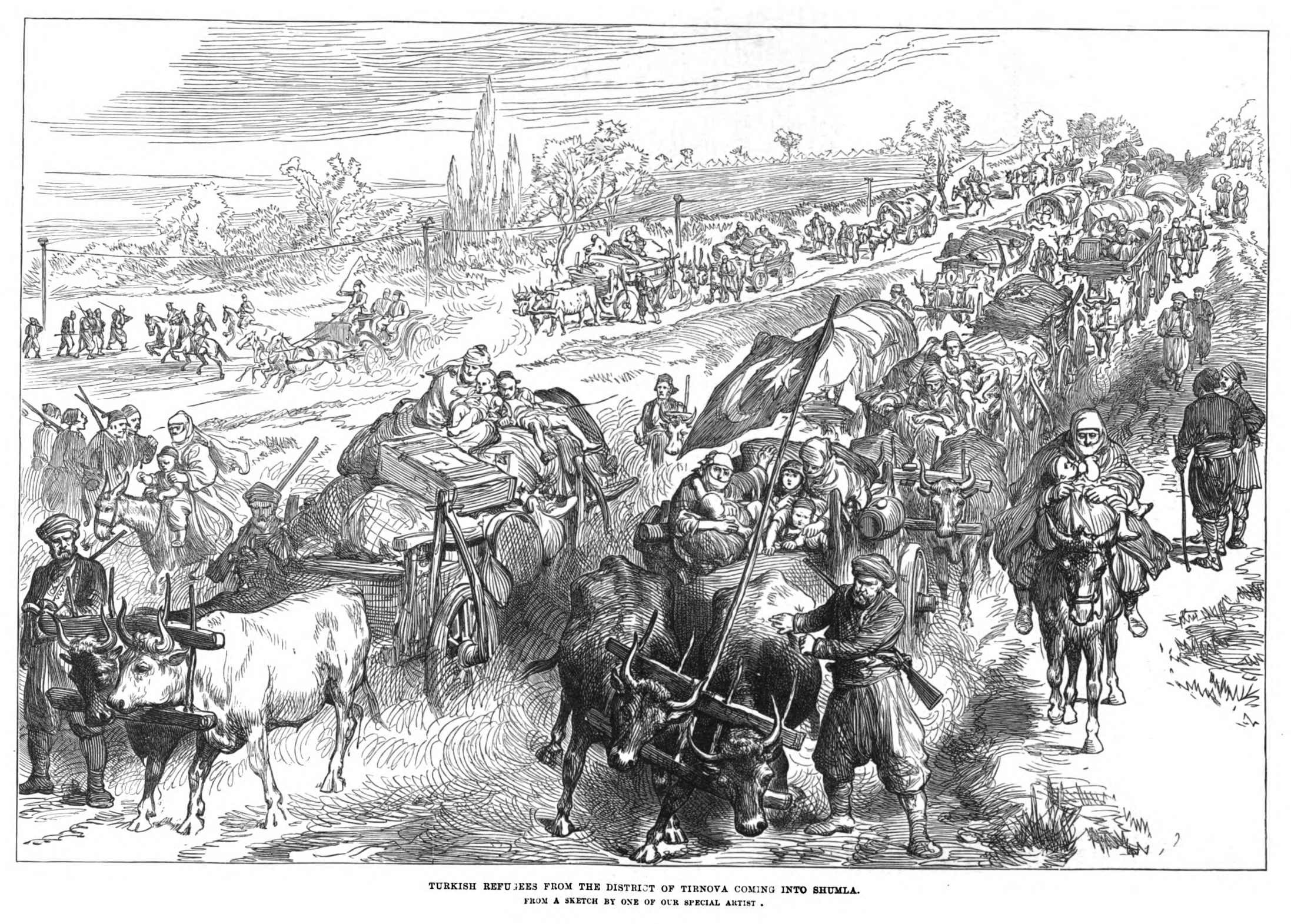
Turkish refugees fleeing from Tarnovo towards Shumen

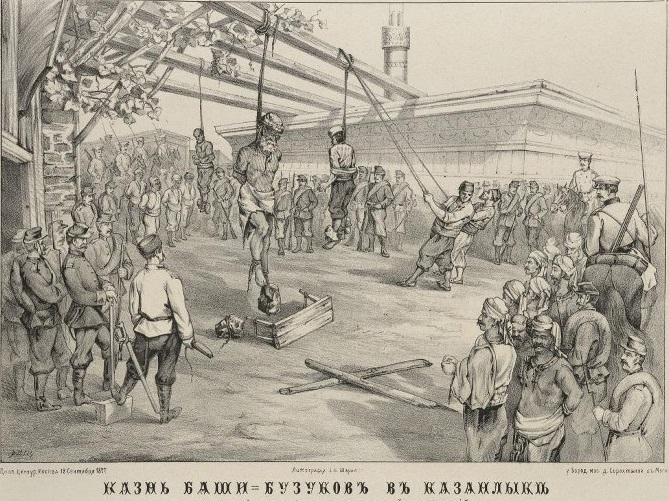
The execution of the Bashi-bazouks in Bulgaria, 1878.

In January 1878, advancing coalition forces started committing atrocities against Muslim populations in the region. British reports from that time have detailed information about atrocities and massacres. According to those reports, in the village of İssova Bâlâ, the school and 96 of the 170 houses were burned to the ground. The inhabitants of Yukarı Sofular were slaughtered and 12 of the 130 houses in the village, a mosque, and a school were burned. In Kozluca, 18 Turks were killed. Massacres of Muslim inhabitants occurred in Kazanlak too. In the village of Muflis, 127 Muslim inhabitants were kidnapped by a group of Russian and Bulgarian troops. 20 managed to escape. The rest were killed. 400 people from Muflis were killed according to Ottoman sources. 11 inhabitants were killed in Keçidere. According to John Joseph the Russian troops frequently killed Muslim peasants to prevent them from disrupting their supply and troop movements. During the Battle of Harmanli accompanying this retaliation on Muslim non-combatants, it was reported that a large number of Muslim townspeople were attacked by the Russian army. Thousands died and their goods were confiscated. The correspondent of The Daily News describes as an eyewitness the burning of four or five Turkish villages by the Russian troops in response to the Turks firing at the Russians from the villages, instead of behind rocks or trees, which must have appeared to the Russian soldiers as guerrilla attempts by the local Muslim populace upon the Russian contingencies operating against the Ottoman forces embedded in the area. During the conflict a number of Muslim buildings and cultural centres were also destroyed. A large library of old Turkish books was destroyed when a mosque in Turnovo was burned in 1877. Most mosques in Sofia were destroyed, seven of them in one night in December 1878 when "a thunderstorm masked the noise of the explosions arranged by Russian military engineers."

Many villages in the Kars region were pillaged by Russian Army during the war. The war in Caucasus caused many Muslims to migrate to remaining Ottoman lands, mostly in poverty and with poor conditions. Between 1878-1881, 82,000 Muslims migrated to the Ottoman Empire from lands ceded to Russia in Caucasus.

===== Muslim war refugees according to census data and Ottoman official documents =====
According to Ottoman official records, the total number of refugees from the lands ceded in 1878 to the Principality of Bulgaria, Eastern Rumelia, Serbia, Romania and Austria-Hungary (from Bosnia) from 1876 to 1879 stands at 571,152 people: 276,389 in 1876, 198,000 in 1877, 76,000 in 1878 and 20,763 in 1879. However, it is unclear if the numbers include refugees who emigrated after the suspension of hostilities.

According to the pre-war Ottoman Salname of 1875, the total male Muslim population of the five vilayets to form the future Principality of Bulgaria – Rusçuk, Vidin, Sofia, Tirnova, and Varna – stood at 405,450 (total population of 810,900), however, inclusive of Circassian Muhacir and Muslim Romani. The Danube vilayet census of 1874, which covered all sanjaks in the vilayet except Niš counted a total of 963,596 Muslims. The total Muslim population of the Danube Vilayet for the same year, Niš included, stood at 1,055,650. This number included not only Ottoman Turks, but also Crimean Tatars, Circassians, Pomaks, Romani as well as a substantial number of Albanians.

At the same time, the 1876 Ottoman population records for the Sanjaks of Filibe and İslimye, which were detached from the Adrianople Vilayet to form Eastern Rumelia in 1878, indicated 171,777 male Turks and 16,353 male Muslim Roma, or total Muslim population of 376,260. This figure however included the Rhodopian kazas of Ahi Çelebi and Sultanyeri (male Muslim population of 8,197 and 13,336, respectively, or total Muslim population for both of 43,066), which remained part of in the Ottoman Empire. Without Ahi Çelebi and Sultanyeri, the Muslim population of Eastern Rumelia was 333,194.

Thus, according to the Ottoman Empire's own population records, the total number of Muslims in the territories ceded by the Empire to the Principality of Bulgaria, Eastern Rumelia, Serbia and Romania, did not exceed 1,388,844 people (1,055,650 for the Danube Vilayet and 333,194 for the Filibe and İslimye Sanjaks), a figure that is lower than the approx. 1.5 million Turks who had reportedly perished or been forced to migrate according to both Karpat and İpek – whose estimates would also necessarily mean that no Muslims whatsoever remained in either the Principality of Bulgaria, Eastern Rumelia, Serbia or Romanian Dobruja.

At the same time, the 1880 population census of the Principality of Bulgaria gave 578,060 Muslims; the 1880 population census of Eastern Rumelia indicated 174,749 Turks and 19,254 Romani (total Muslim population of 194,003); the 1880 population census of Romanian North Dobruja showed 18,624 Turks and 29,476 Crimean Tatars (total of 48,100 Muslims), while the 1880 population census of Serbia stated only 6,567 Muslims in the Niš area.

Thus, as of 1880, the total number of Muslims who lived in the territories ceded by the Ottoman Empire stood at 827,000 people, down from 1,388,844 counted by the pre-war Ottoman census data, representing a net loss of 561,844 Muslims (40.4%). While shockingly high, this figure falls short by more than 200,000 people from Dennis P. Hupchick and Justin McCarthy's estimates of some 260,000 Muslims missing/dead and 500,000 forced to emigrate and is way more off compared to the figure of more than 750,000 Muslim casualties and victims of ethnic cleansing from the Bulgarian lands alone quoted by Douglas Arthur Howard.

The Principality of Bulgaria, Eastern Rumelia and Romania accounted for a negative net balance of 472,792 Muslims (or a net loss of 36.5%).

By comparison, Serbia, the only country in the region, which did indeed engage in ethnic cleansing and forced expulsion of its Muslim population, effectively reduced its Muslim population between 1877 and 1880 from 95,619 to 6,567 people (cf. Expulsion of the Albanians, 1877–1878), i.e., a net loss of 89,052 Muslims, or 93%.

===== Historians' estimates about Muslim population losses =====
20th century historians have made different guesses about the total Muslim losses during the Russo-Turkish war. Leslie Rogne Schumacher notes that anywhere between the tens of thousands to over 200,000 Balkan Muslims were killed. Mark Levene estimated the deaths at the "tens of thousands". Roumen Daskalov wrote that 100,000 Muslims were either killed or forced to emigrate. Dennis P. Hupchick, citing Justin McCarthy, says that 260,000 people went missing and 500,000 became refugees. Turkish historian Kemal Karpat claims that 250–300,000 people, about 17% of the former Muslim population of Bulgaria, died as a consequence of famine, disease, and massacres, and 1 to 1.5 million people were forced to migrate. Turkish author Nedim İpek gives the same numbers as Karpat. Turkish author Salahi Ramadan Sonyel claims 400,000 Turks were massacred and 1,000,000 Turks had to migrate during the war. The perpetrators of those massacres are also disputed, with Justin McCarthy claiming that they were carried out by Russian soldiers, Cossacks as well as Bulgarian volunteers and villagers, though there were few civilian casualties in battle. while historian James J. Reid claims that Circassians were significantly responsible for the refugee flow, that there were civilian casualties from battle and that the Ottoman army was responsible for casualties among the Muslim population, writing that many of those casualties were "caused by Ottoman generals who either denied the basics of life to their own soldiers, or fired upon them as they retreated from battle", accusing Ottoman generals as having "significant annihilative tendencies" towards their Muslim soldiers or subjects.

The number of Muslim refugees is estimated by R.J. Crampton to be 130,000. According to him, half of them returned after the war. Richard C. Frucht estimates that only half (700,000) of the prewar Muslim population remained after the war, 216,000 had died and the rest emigrated. Douglas Arthur Howard estimates that half the 1.5 million Muslims, for the most part Turks, in prewar Bulgaria had disappeared by 1879. 200,000 had died, the rest became permanently refugees in Ottoman territories.

Justin McCarthy, who is the author of the larger estimates above and has been cited by both Hupchik and Howard, is an Armenian genocide denialist who has been criticised severely by many of his colleagues for whitewashing Ottoman history. Moreover, McCarthy is a member of, and has received grants from, the Institute of Turkish Studies. Throughout his career, he has been accused, among other things, of being "an apologist for the Turkish state", of having "an indefensible bias toward the Turkish official position", of selectively using sources and of always ascribing intent to non-Ottoman troops while making excuses for Ottoman ones for similar events.

==== Ottoman and Albanian atrocities against Greeks and the murder of Charles Chaloner Ogle ====
Albanian irregulars were known for robbing and plundering Greeks in Thessaly and Elassona. A certain Turco-Albanian by the name of Amoush Aga, a notorious brigand who had nevertheless been appointed Chief of Police of Thessaly, commanded Ottoman and Albanian irregular forces and was implicated in atrocities against Greeks. British MP Henry Samuelson attributed murder, rape, torture, burning, and other abuses to him.

In the village of Elafos, Amoush Aga summoned ten Greek notables to pay homage so, in return, he wouldn't enter and destroy the village. The notables paid, but were killed anyway. The Ottoman and Albanian forces proceeded to enter the village and sexually abuse women and children. British Vice-Consul at Volos, Henry Longworth, personally saw and confirmed the dead bodies of the ten men.

Charles Chaloner Ogle visited the scene of the crimes a week later. He confronted Amoush Aga who originally denied the crimes, but later admitted them and begged Ogle not to make them public. However, Ogle refused to do so and reported them. He was later assassinated under unknown circumstances, with Amoush Aga being widely considered the perpetrator. Ogle was shot through the breast, bayoneted, and decapitated, with his head carried away as proof for the reward.

Ogle also reported that men, women and children had been massacred at Makrinitsa and Portaria. Samuelson added that the captain and officers of an Italian ironclad had personally visited Makrinitsa and had confirmed Ogle's reports. Meanwhile, Turkish soldiers were looting, pillaging and killing throughout the region. Samuelson notes that a certain Reschid Pasha "treated the conquered peasants with the greatest inhumanity and cruelty".

==== Ottoman atrocities against Bulgarians ====
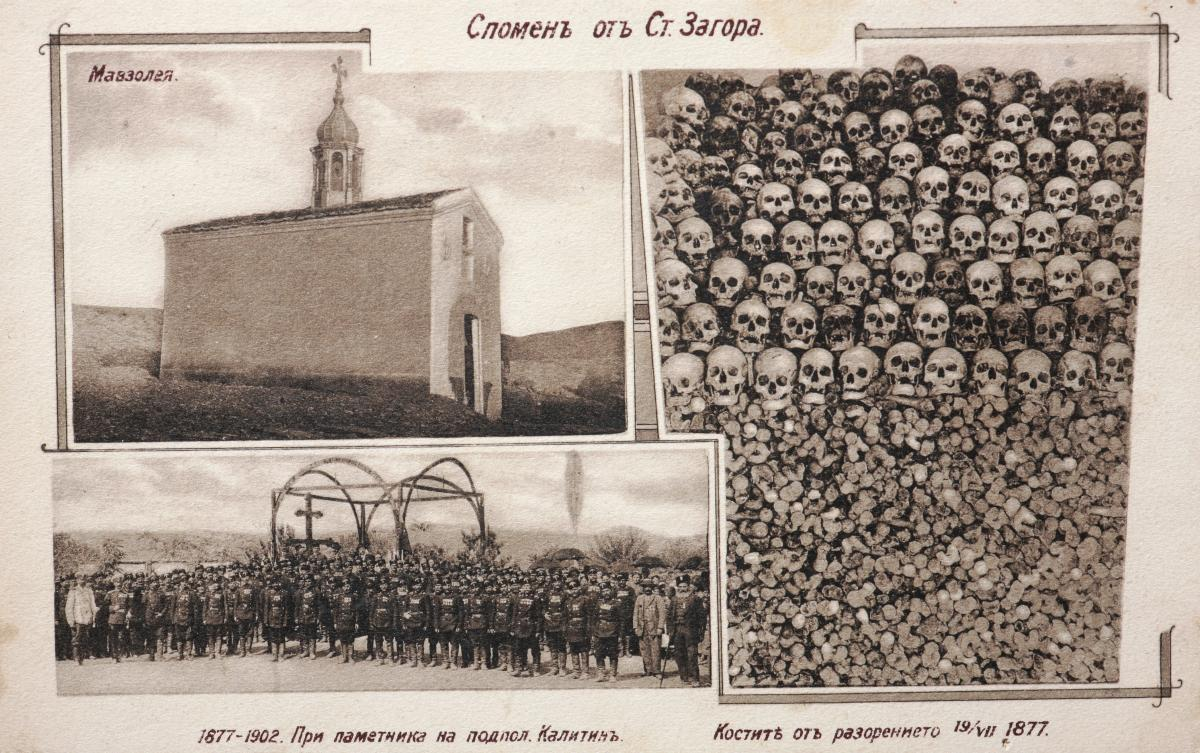
Bones of massacred Bulgarians at Stara Zagora (ethnic cleansing by the Ottoman Empire)

The most notable massacre of Bulgarian civilians during the Russo-Turkish War took place during the Battle of Stara Zagora in July 1877, when Gurko's forces had to retreat back to the Shipka Pass. In the aftermath of the battle, Suleiman Pasha's forces burned down and plundered the city of Stara Zagora and subjected its population to indiscriminate slaughter.

At the time, Stara Zagora was not only one of the biggest Bulgarian cities, but it also accommodated some 20,000 refugees from nearby villages, seeking shelter from Ottoman reprisals. The number of massacred Christian civilians in the course of the battle is estimated at between 14,000–14,500, which would make it the biggest war crime in modern-era Bulgaria. In addition to the massacre carried out by the Suleiman's regular forces, Circassian bashi-bazouks engaged in numerous acts of looting, plunder and killing, among other things, The Terror in Karlovo, the Kalofer massacre, the Kavarna massacre etc. etc.

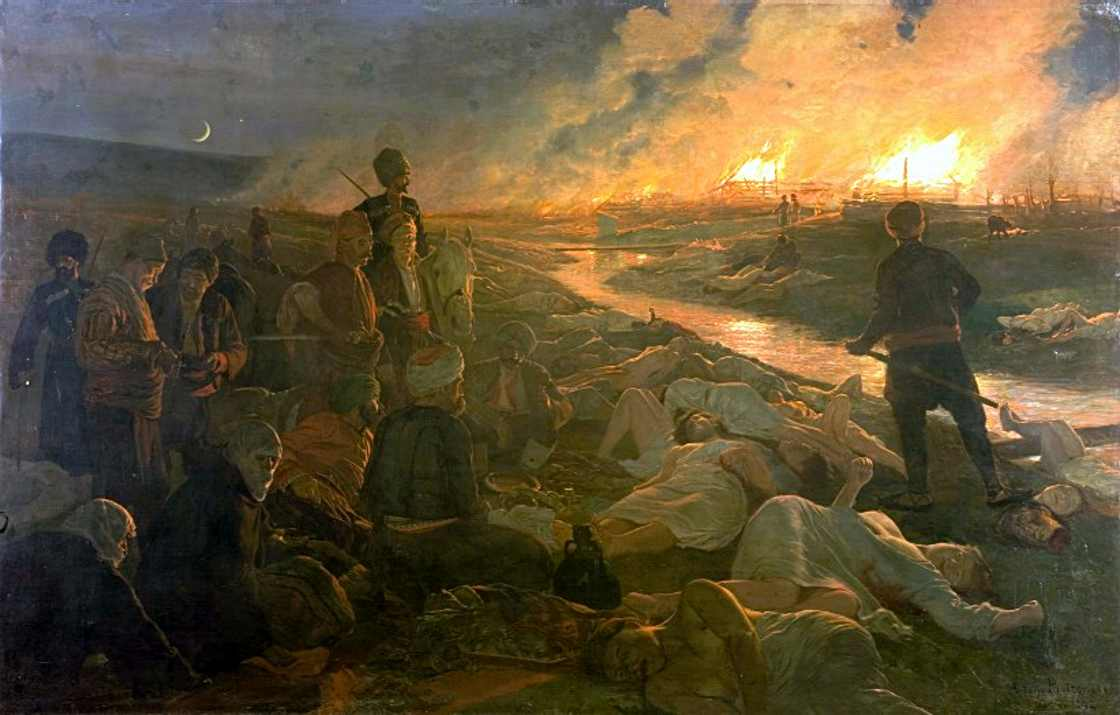
The Batak massacre carried out by Ottoman Irregular Troops in Bulgaria in 1876

Moreover, Suleiman Pasha's forces also established an entire system of police and judicial terror across the entire valley of the Maritsa, where any Bulgarian who had ever in any way assisted the Russians was hanged. However, even villages that had not assisted the Russians were destroyed and their inhabitants massacred. As a result, as many as 100,000 civilian Bulgarians fled north to the Russian occupied territories. Later on in the campaign, the Ottoman forces planned to burn the town of Sofia after Gurko had managed to overcome their resistance in the passes of Western part of the Balkan Mountains.

Only the refusal of the Italian Consul Vito Positano, the French Vice Consul Leandre le Gay and the Austro–Hungarian Vice Consul to leave Sofia prevented that from happening. After the Ottoman retreat, Positano even organized armed detachments to protect the population from marauders (deserters from the regular Ottoman Army and Bashi-bazouks). Circassians in the Ottoman forces also raped and murdered Bulgarians during the 1877 Russo-Turkish War.

According to Bulgarian historians, 30,000 Bulgarian civilians were killed during the war, with two-thirds of the killings being committed in the Stara Zagora area.

==== Russian atrocities against Circassians ====
Russians raped Circassian girls during the 1877 Russo-Turkish War from the Circassian refugees who were settled in the Ottoman Balkans. After the signing of the Treaty of San Stefano, the 10,000-strong Circassian minority in Dobruja was expelled.

== Lasting effects ==
=== International Red Cross and Red Crescent Movement ===
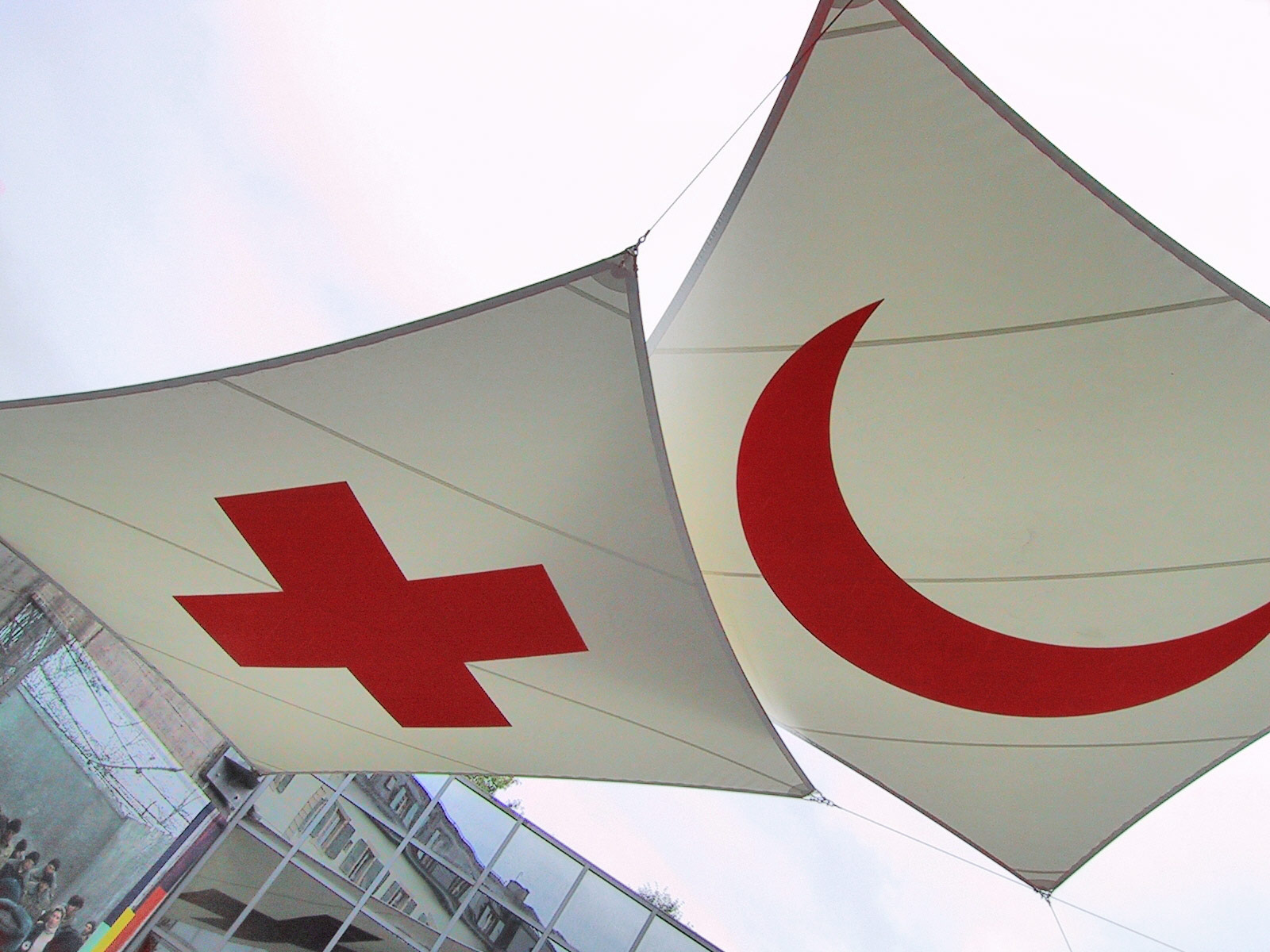
The Red Cross and the Red Crescent emblems

This war caused a division in the emblems of the International Red Cross and Red Crescent Movement which continues to this day. Both Russia and the Ottoman Empire had signed the First Geneva Convention (1864), which made the Red Cross, a colour reversal of the flag of neutral Switzerland, the sole emblem of protection for military medical personnel and facilities. However, during this war the cross instead reminded the Ottomans of the Crusades; so they elected to replace the cross with the Red Crescent instead. This ultimately became the symbol of the Movement's national societies in most Muslim countries, and was ratified as an emblem of protection by later Geneva Conventions in 1929 and again in 1949 (the current version).

Iran, which neighbored both the Russian Empire and Ottoman Empire, considered them to be rivals, and probably considered the Red Crescent in particular to be an Ottoman symbol; except for the Red Crescent being centred and without a star, it is a colour reversal of the Ottoman flag (and the modern Turkish flag). This appears to have led to their national society in the Movement being initially known as the Red Lion and Sun Society, using a red version of the Lion and Sun, a traditional Iranian symbol. After the Iranian Revolution of 1979, Iran switched to the Red Crescent, but the Geneva Conventions continue to recognize the Red Lion and Sun as an emblem of protection.

== In popular culture ==
The Armenian novella Jalaleddin, published in 1878 by the novelist Raffi, describes the Kurdish massacres of Armenians in the eastern Ottoman Empire at the time of the Russo-Turkish war. The novella follows the journey of a young man through the mountains of Anatolia. The historical descriptions in the novella correspond with information from British sources at the time.

The novel The Doll (Polish title: Lalka), written in 1887–1889 by Bolesław Prus, describes consequences of the Russo-Turkish war for merchants living in Russia and partitioned Poland. The main protagonist helped his Russian friend, a multi-millionaire, and made a fortune supplying the Russian Army in 1877–1878. The novel describes trading during political instability, and its ambiguous results for Russian and Polish societies.

The 1912 silent film Independența României depicted the war in Romania.

Russian writer Boris Akunin uses the war as the setting for the novel The Turkish Gambit (1998).

== See also ==
- Osman Pasha Bedirkhan Revolt
- Batak massacre
- Battles of the Russo-Turkish War (1877–78)
- Harmanli massacre
- History of the Balkans
- Monument to the Tsar Liberator
- Provisional Russian Administration in Bulgaria
- Romanian War of Independence
- Russo-Turkish War (1877–1878) order of battle: Ottoman Navy
- Serbo-Russian March
- The Russian Monument at San Stefano
- The Turkish Gambit
- To war

== Bibliography ==
- Allen, William E. D.; Muratoff, Paul (1953). Caucasian Battlefields. Cambridge: Cambridge University Press.
- Argyll, George Douglas Campbell (1879). The Eastern question from the Treaty of Paris 1856 to the Treaty of Berlin 1878 and to the Second Afghan War. Vol. 2. London: Strahan.
- Crampton, R. J. (2006) [1997]. A Concise History of Bulgaria. Cambridge: Cambridge University Press. ISBN 0-521-85085-1.
- Dupuy, Robert E.; Dupuy, Trevor N. (1993). The Harper Encyclopedia of Military History: From 3500 BC to the Present. New York: HarperCollins Publishers. ISBN 0-06-270056-1.
- Clodfelter, Micheal (2017). Warfare and Armed Conflicts: A Statistical Encyclopedia of Casualty and Other Figures, 1492–2015 (4 ed.). Jefferson, North Carolina: McFarland & Company. ISBN 9781476625850.
- Gladstone, William Ewart (1876). Bulgarian Horrors and the Question of the East. London: William Clowes & Sons. OL 7083313M.
- Greene, F. V. (1879). The Russian Army and its Campaigns in Turkey. New York: D.Appleton and Company – via Internet Archive.
- von Herbert, Frederick William (1895). The Defence of Plevna 1877. London: Longmans, Green & Co – via Internet Archive.
- Hupchick, D. P. (2002). The Balkans: From Constantinople to Communism. Palgrave. ISBN 1-4039-6417-3.
- Jonassohn, Kurt (1999). Genocide and gross human rights violations: in comparative perspective. Transaction Publishers. ISBN 978-1-4128-2445-3.
- Kofos, Evangelos (1977). "Από το τέλος της Κρητικής Επαναστάσεως ως την προσάρτηση της Θεσσαλίας" [From the End of the Cretan Revolution to the Annexation of Thessaly]. In Christopoulos, Georgios A. & Bastias, Ioannis K. (eds.). Ιστορία του Ελληνικού Έθνους [History of the Greek Nation] (in Greek). Vol. ΙΓ: Νεώτερος Ελληνισμός από το 1833 έως το 1881 [Modern Hellenism from 1833 to 1881]. Athens: Ekdotiki Athinon. pp. 289–365. ISBN 978-960-213-109-1.
- Langensiepen, Bernd & Güleryüz, Ahmet (1995). The Ottoman Steam Navy 1828–1923. London: Conway Maritime Press. ISBN 978-0-85177-610-1.
- Maurice, Major F. (1905). The Russo-Turkish War 1877; A Strategical Sketch. London: Swan Sonneschein – via Internet Archive.
- McCarthy, Justin (1995). Death and Exile: The Ethnic Cleansing of Ottoman Muslims, 1821–1922. Darwin Press. ISBN 978-0-87850-094-9.
- Phillips, Charles; Axelrod, Alan, eds. (2005). Encyclopedia of Wars. Vol. 1. New York City: Facts on File. ISBN 9780816028511.
- Reid, James J. (2000). Crisis of the Ottoman Empire: Prelude to Collapse 1839–1878. Quellen und Studien zur Geschichte des östlichen Europa. Vol. 57 (illustrated ed.). Stuttgart: Franz Steiner Verlag. ISBN 978-3-515-07687-6. ISSN 0170-3595.
- Shaw, Stanford J.; Shaw, Ezel Kural (1977). History of the Ottoman Empire and Modern Turkey. Vol. 2, Reform, Revolution, and Republic: The Rise of Modern Turkey 1808–1975. Cambridge: Cambridge University Press. ISBN 978-0-521-29163-7.
- Stavrianos, L. S. (1958). The Balkans Since 1453. NYU Press. pp. 393–412. ISBN 978-0-8147-9766-2.
- The War Correspondence of the "Daily News" 1877 with a Connecting Narrative Forming a Continuous History of the War Between Russia and Turkey to the Fall of Kars Including the Letters of Mr. Archibald Forbes, Mr. J. A. MacGahan and Many Other Special Correspondents in Europe and Asia. London: Macmillan and Co. 1878 – via Internet Archive.
- The War Correspondence of the "Daily News" 1877–1878 continued from the Fall of Kars to the Signature of the Preliminaries of Peace. London: Macmillan and Co. 1878 – via Internet Archive.
