= List of massacres of Bulgarians =

This is a list of massacre against ethnic Bulgarians living in Bulgaria and outside of Bulgaria.

Name of the massacre	Date	Number of victims	Preparators	Notes
Batak massacre	May 1876	1,346-5,000	Ottoman irregular troops	According to the Ottoman sources, the number of killed Bulgarians is 1,346. Other sources claim 5,000; however the village's total population was under 5,000 during the massacre. Part of the April Uprising.
Boyadzhik massacre	May 1876	145-170	Ottoman Circassians	Also known as the "Bloody Horo", today the names of 145 of the victims are recovered. Part of the April Uprising.
Stara Zagora massacre	1877-1878	14,500	Albanian troops of the Ottoman army	A similar massacre in Stara Zagora, Nova Zagora, and Kazanlak happened against the Turkish population of the town as well. Part of the Russo-Turkish War of 1877-1878.
Karlovo massacre	July 1877	288	Ottoman Circassians	Also known as "Strashnoto" [The Terror]. Civilians casualties are 288; 500 notables of Karlovo were exiled to Anatolia or executed. Part of the Russo-Turkish War of 1877-1878.
Kalofer massacre	July 1877	618	Ottoman Circassians	The entire town was burned along with 1308 houses, 250 stores, 200 ginning undertakings and watermills and 1400 stables. Part of the Russo-Turkish War of 1877-1878.
Kavarna massacre	July-August 1877	1,000	Ottoman Circassians	5,000 Bulgarian refugees. Part of the Russo-Turkish War of 1877-1878.
Gyuneli mahalle massacre	14 July 1877	1,013	Ottoman army, Ottoman bashibozuk, Circassians	Other sources claim 2,400 massacred. Part of the Russo-Turkish War of 1877-1878.
Eski Dzhumaya massacre	28 January 1878	400	Оttoman bashibozuk and Circassians	The town was burned down. Part of the Russo-Turkish War of 1877-1878.
Zeleniche bloody wedding massacre	13 November 1904	13	Greeks gangs Georgios Kattechakis	Among the victims are the groom, his friends, two children. Part of the Macedonian Questioin.
Zagorichani massacre	25 March 1904	62	Greek gangs	6 were injured Part of the Macedonian Question.
Skumsko massacre	May 1905	43	Greek gangs	Not including 8 victims from Zhupanishta. Part of the Macedonian Question.
Nevolyani massacre	28 September 1905	unknown	Greek gangs	The massacred people were preparing for a wedding. Part of the Macedonian Question.
Shtip massacre	December 1911	17	Turks of Shtip	As a revenge for the earlier Bulgarian explosions in the town, that killed 2 people, and injured 25. Part of the "Donkey Attacks"
Kochani massacre	19 July 1912	42	Turks of Kochani	As a revenge for the earlier Bulgarian explosions in the town, that killed 24 people. Part of the "Donkey Attacks."
Destrcution of the Thracian Bulgarians	July-August 1913	15,960	Ottoman army, bashibozuks	According to Lyubomir Miletich 200,000 people were killed or forced to leave.
Bloody Christmas	January 1945	1,200	Yugoslav communist authorities in the Socialist Republic of Macedonia	The massacred people were called "traitors" and "collaborationists" by SRM. Part of WWII in Yugoslavia.
