= Massacres of Christians in the Later Ottoman Empire =

Mass violence against Christian communities in the Ottoman Empire

Massacres of Christians in the Later Ottoman Empire were episodes of mass killing directed against Christian populations living in Ottoman territories. From the beginning of the nineteenth century through the dissolution of the Ottoman Empire, victims included Greeks, Armenians, Assyrians, Syriacs, Chaldean Catholics, Bulgarians, Serbs, Maronites, and members of other Christian communities.

Violence was carried out at different times by Ottoman officials. These officials included Janissaries, Kurdish tribes, local Muslim mobs and other armed groups. In some episodes the central government ordered or organized violence while in others provincial authorities tolerated, facilitated or failed to prevent the violence. Some incidents classified with anti-Christian violence in the Ottoman setting, such as the Kokošinje murders, were perpetrated by non-state revolutionary organizations rather than by Ottoman authorities.

Historians consequently do not describe all violence against Ottoman Christians from the early nineteenth century to 1923 as one policy. The causes were due to a variety of events, which included suppression of revolts, sectarian conflict, social tensions, imperial warfare, demographic engineering, forced migration and, in the case of the Armenian genocide, a centrally directed campaign of deportation and mass killing recognized as genocide by the overwhelming majority of historians and genocide scholars who study the subject.

During the empire's last decades, the destruction of Armenian, Assyrian/Syriac and Ottoman Greek communities impacted the empire greatly. Some scholars analyze the Armenian genocide, Assyrian genocide (Sayfo) and violence against Ottoman Greeks within a common framework of demographic transformation while other scholars emphasize individual acts by politicians in each province or locale. No generally accepted aggregate death toll exists for Christians in the later empire. During the rule of the Young Turks, 3.5 million Christians died in the Armenian genocide.

== Background ==
=== Christians in the Ottoman Empire ===
For much of Ottoman history, religious affiliation was an important element of legal and social status. Various religious communities possessed varying degrees of autonomy while remaining subjects of the Islamic imperial polity of the Ottomans. The position of non-Muslims differed greatly by region and time period.

During the nineteenth century, the Ottoman state attempted to replace older hierarchies with a more centralized concept of imperial citizenship. The Tanzimat reforms, particularly the imperial edicts of 1839 and 1856, promised greater legal equality to non-Muslims.

National movements in the Balkans and growing European intervention further transformed relations between the state and Christian populations. Russia and other European powers frequently invoked the protection of Ottoman Christians in diplomacy. At the same time, warfare and the contraction of Ottoman territory displaced large numbers of Muslims from the Balkans and Caucasus into remaining Ottoman lands. Historians have emphasized these refugee movements and increasingly exclusionary concepts of sovereignty affected all religious communities in the empire.

== Early nineteenth century ==
=== Serbian and Greek revolutions ===
The violence accompanying the disintegration of Ottoman authority in parts of the Balkans predated the later massacres of Armenians and other eastern Christians. The First Serbian Uprising of 1804 followed the seizure of power in the Belgrade Pashalik by renegade Janissaries and their killing of Serbian leaders. The revolt developed into a wider war involving massacres, reprisals and population displacement on both sides.

The Greek War of Independence beginning in 1821 was marked by violence against civilians. Ottoman authorities interpreted the uprising as a potentially wider threat from Orthodox populations elsewhere in the empire. In Constantinople, prominent Greeks were executed. See Constantinople massacre of 1821 for more information.

The best-known episode was the Chios massacre of 1822. After revolutionaries from neighboring Samos landed on the island, Ottoman troops suppressed the revolt and oppressed much of the population. The destruction of Chios became one of the principal causes célèbres of European philhellenism and inspired humanitarian efforts.

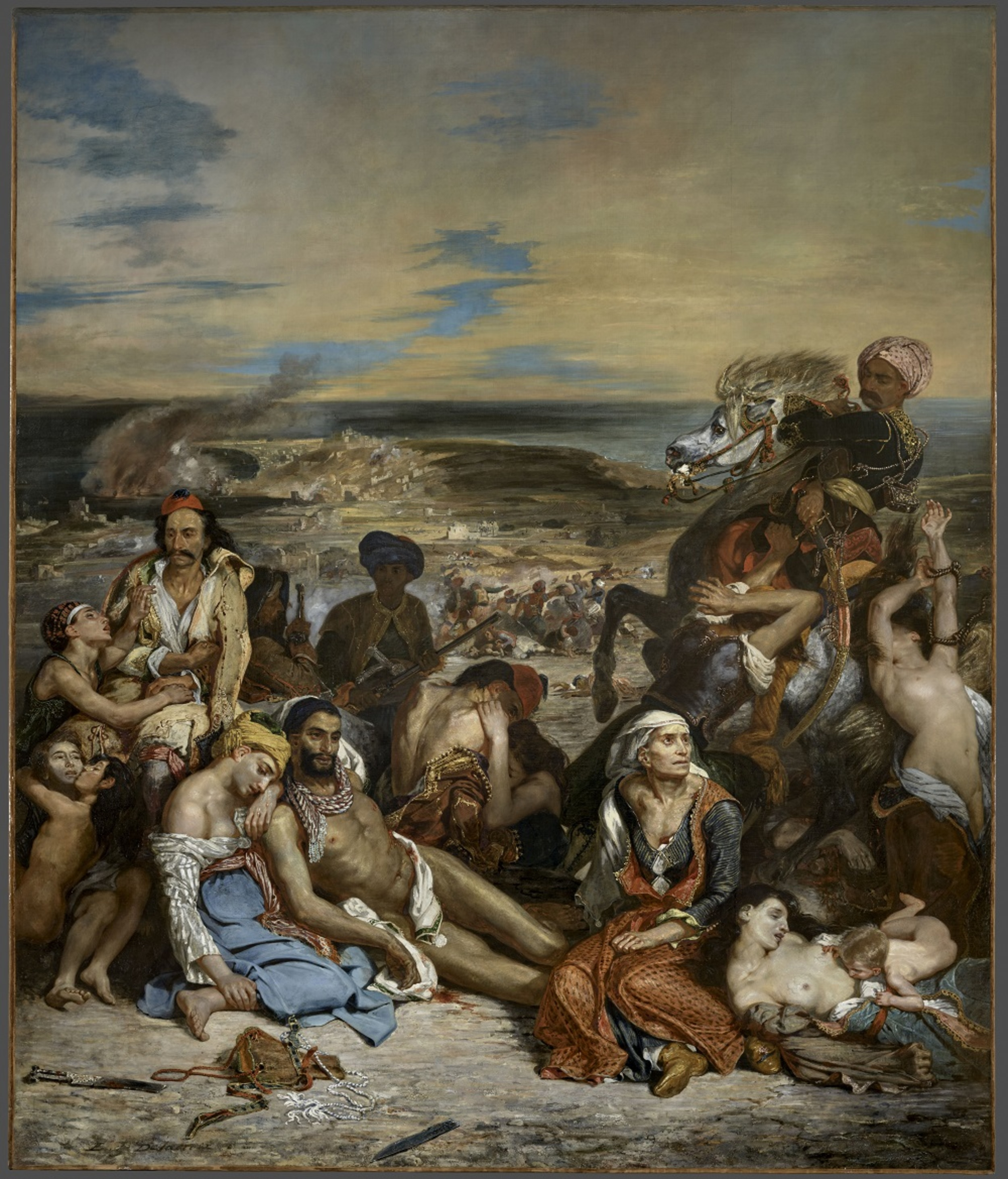
Eugène Delacroix's The Massacre at Chios (1824) helped make the destruction of Chios an emblematic episode of European philhellenism.

In 1824 Egyptian-Ottoman forces attacked the maritime stronghold of Kasos, producing the killings known as the Kasos Massacre. Weeks later Ottoman forces captured Psara. The subsequent Destruction of Psara involved extensive killing.

=== Northern Mesopotamia ===
Christian communities in the empire's eastern borderlands were affected by conflicts involving semi-autonomous Kurdish rulers, tribal confederations, missionaries and Ottoman attempts at centralization. In 1832 forces of the Soran emir Mir Muhammad attacked Alqosh. Local Christians were killed and property plundered during the Massacre of Rabban Hormizd Monastery. The attack was carried out by forces of the Kurdish Soran principality rather than as a centrally planned Ottoman massacre.

In the 1840s the Assyrian tribes of Hakkari were attacked by Ottoman forces. The 1843 and 1846 massacres in Hakkari caused severe loss of life, enslavement and destruction among Assyrian communities. Ottoman authorities ultimately moved against Bedir Khan as part of their campaign to impose greater central control over the region.

== Mid-century violence in the Arab provinces ==
=== Aleppo ===
The Massacre of Aleppo (1850) occurred amid resistance to Ottoman conscription and centralizing reforms, economic change and tensions surrounding the changing status of Christians. Rioters attacked Christian quarters, churches and property. Bruce Masters connects the disturbances to the changing political economy of nineteenth-century Aleppo and resentment of state reforms rather than reducing them solely to religious hostility.

=== Jeddah ===
In June 1858 violence in the Red Sea port of Jeddah resulted in the killing of Christians. The Jeddah massacre of 1858 became an international diplomatic crisis. Scholars have examined how European reporting represented the event as evidence of generalized Muslim “fanaticism."

=== Mount Lebanon ===
The 1860 civil conflict in Mount Lebanon and Damascus was among the century's most consequential episodes of communal violence. Fighting in Mount Lebanon between Druze and Maronite forces developed out of political, social and economic conflicts which intensified during decades of Ottoman and European intervention. Thousands of Christians were killed and Christian villages destroyed.

Violence subsequently spread to Damascus, where Muslim mobs attacked the Christian quarter in July 1860, killing large numbers of inhabitants and burning homes, businesses and churches. The conduct of Ottoman officials ranged from complicity and failure to protect civilians to rescue efforts. The Algerian exile Abd al-Qadir and his followers famously sheltered large numbers of Christians. Ottoman authorities later executed alleged participants and an international intervention brought French troops to Syria.

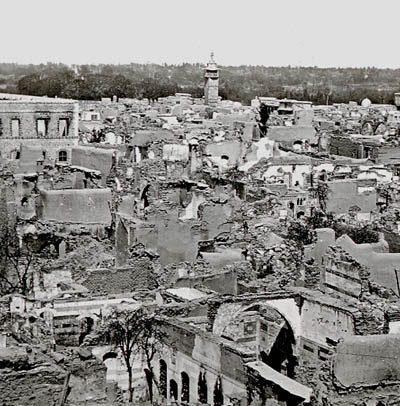
The ruined Christian quarter of Damascus after the violence of 1860.

== Balkan & Cretan crises of the 1870s ==
=== Bulgaria ===
The Ottoman suppression of the Bulgarian April Uprising of 1876 were atrocities committed primarily by irregular forces. The most notorious was the Batak massacre, in which a large part of the Christian population of Batak was killed. Reports of Batak and related atrocities became a major issue in European journalism and British politics. Other settlements suffered similar attacks, including Boyadzhik in the Boyadzhik massacre.

The subsequent Russo-Turkish War of 1877–1878 generated further displacement. Episodes in Bulgarian history include the Stara Zagora massacre, the Kalofer massacre, and The Terror (Karlovo massacre). The war produced large refugee flows and accelerated the demographic transformation of the Balkans.

=== Crete ===
Crete experienced repeated violent incidents during the nineteenth century. In September 1898, during the final crisis of Ottoman rule on the island, armed Muslim Cretans attacked British troops and Christian civilians in Candia (Heraklion). The Candia massacre helped precipitate the removal of Ottoman forces and the establishment of an autonomous Cretan state under international supervision.

== Hamidian massacres ==
Between 1894 and 1896 large-scale massacres struck Armenian communities across Anatolia. Collectively known as the Hamidian massacres, they involved Ottoman soldiers and gendarmes, Hamidiye cavalry, Kurdish tribal forces and local Muslim participants in varying combinations. Looting, destruction of churches and homes, forced conversion and sexual violence accompanied mass killing. Estimates of the death toll vary substantially in the scholarship.

The massacres occurred during the reign of Sultan Abdülhamid II amid conflict over Armenian demands for reform. Scholars places responsibility on Hamidian state institutions for enabling massacures. The violence was not confined to Armenians. During the Massacres of Diyarbekir (1895), Syriac, Assyrian and Chaldean Christians were also attacked and massacred. Media coverage of the Hamidian massacres stimulated humanitarian activism in Europe and the United States.

== Macedonia and the Young Turk Revolution ==
At the turn of the twentieth century, Ottoman Macedonia became a field of competition among armed Bulgarian, Greek and Serbian organizations as well as Ottoman security forces. Religious jurisdiction—whether a village adhered to the Ecumenical Patriarchate or Bulgarian Exarchate—became entangled with national identification. Assassination, intimidation and attacks on civilians were employed by rival movements.

The Kokošinje murders of 1904 belong to this setting. A band associated with the Internal Macedonian Revolutionary Organization killed Serbian Orthodox villagers and local notables identified with the Patriarchate. Unlike most episodes described in this article, the perpetrators were Christian revolutionaries operating within Ottoman territory, illustrating why inclusion in a geographic category of massacres in the Ottoman Empire does not by itself establish Ottoman-state responsibility.

The Young Turk Revolution of 1908 temporarily generated hopes for constitutional citizenship and improved Muslim-Christian relations. Those expectations were shaken by the Adana massacre of April 1909. Amid the political crisis surrounding the Ottoman countercoup, violence in Adana and neighboring districts killed thousands of Armenians and some other Christians. The role of local officials, political agitation, rumors and competing forces has been extensively examined in modern scholarship.

Historians generally caution against treating the Adana massacre simply as the opening phase of the 1915 Armenian genocide. Although both events form part of the longer history of anti-Armenian violence, the political regime, immediate causes, actors and mechanisms differed.

== Balkan Wars, First World War and dissolution of the empire ==
=== Demographic engineering and the Aegean Greeks ===
The Balkan Wars transformed the demographic and political environment of the Ottoman state. Muslim refugees arrived from territories lost in Europe while Christian communities in Anatolia increasingly came to be regarded by Unionist nationalists as potential security threats or obstacles to demographic consolidation.

In 1914, before Ottoman entry into the First World War, Greek Orthodox communities along the Aegean coast were subjected to intimidation, boycotts, expulsion and forced migration. Matthias Bjørnlund has described these policies as “violent Turkification”, while other scholars place them within the Committee of Union and Progress's developing program of demographic engineering.

During the war, Greek Orthodox populations were deported from strategically sensitive coastal districts to the interior. The motivations and implementation varied by place and period: security rationales, demographic policy, forced labor, local hostility and confiscation all played roles. Scholarship has emphasized the uneven and sometimes locally negotiated character of wartime internal exile while documenting its severe human consequences.

The deportation of the Greek population of Ayvalık is treated in Evacuation of Ayvalik. Its inclusion among massacres should not obscure the fact the principal measure was forced removal, although deaths and violence occurred in the course of deportation.

=== Armenian genocide ===
In 1915 the Committee of Union and Progress government began the deportation of Armenians from much of the Ottoman Empire. The deportations were accompanied by systematic massacres of Armenians. The resulting destruction is known as the Armenian genocide. The genocide was implemented through decisions of the central government together with local collaborators and irregular forces. Implementation varied regionally, and some Ottoman officials protected Armenians.

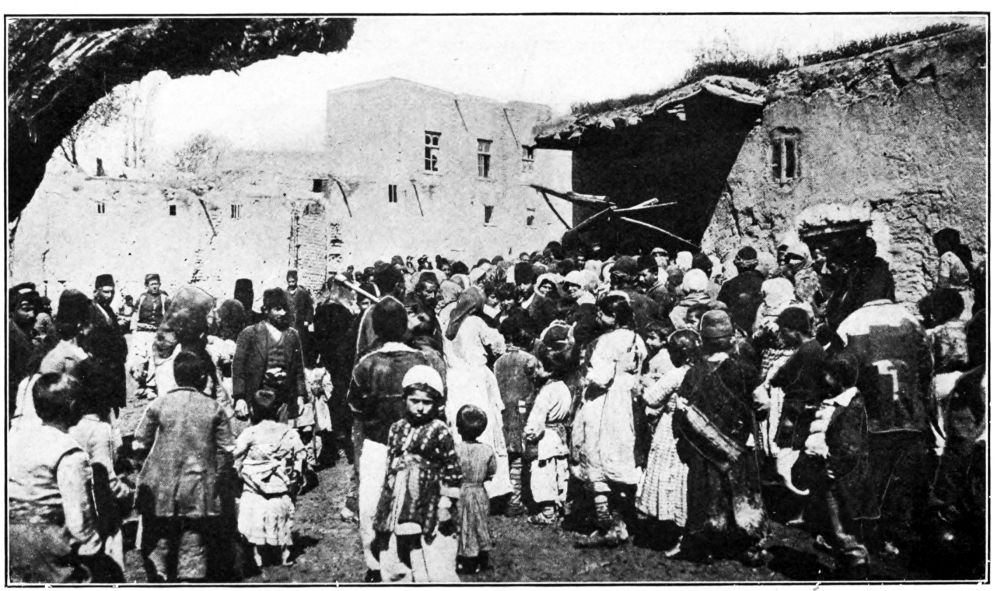
Armenian refugees at Van in 1915.

The destruction also entailed the seizure of Armenian assets. For a structured guide to the extensive subject-specific literature, see Outline of the Armenian genocide.

The Armenian genocide generated an international humanitarian response involving missionaries, diplomats and organizations which eventually became Near East Relief. Relief work for refugees, survivors and orphaned children became important to the development of modern international humanitarian practice.

=== Assyrians and Sayfo ===
Assyrian, Syriac and Chaldean Christian communities in southeastern Anatolia and adjacent districts were subjected to massacres during the First World War. These events are commonly known in Syriac as Sayfo (“the sword”) and are widely discussed in specialist scholarship as the Assyrian genocide.

=== Ottoman Greeks and Pontus ===
Mass violence, deportation and forced migration against Ottoman Greeks occurred in several phases between the Balkan Wars and the end of the Greco-Turkish War.

The Black Sea region experienced severe deportations and killings during the First World War. The events are studied as the Pontic Greek genocide. Estimates of deaths differ among historians.

== See also ==
- Late Ottoman genocides
- Persecution of Christians
- Decline of the Ottoman Empire
- Dissolution of the Ottoman Empire
- Persecution of Muslims during the Ottoman contraction
- Christianity in the Ottoman Empire
