= Kavarna massacre =

Ottoman massacre of Bulgarian civilians

Coordinates: 43°26′00″N 28°20′20″E

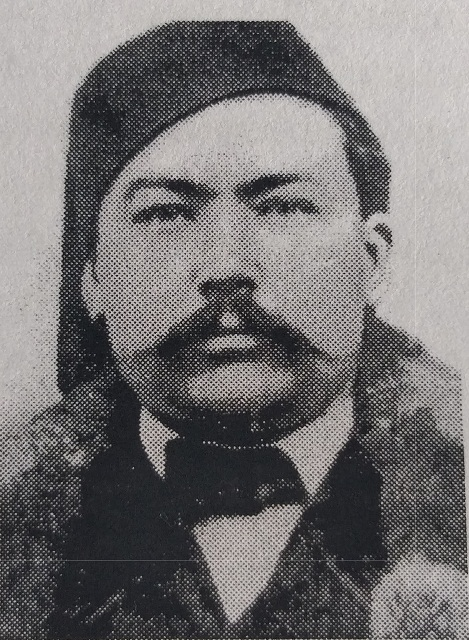
The leader of the Kavarna Insurrection: Andrey Dimitrov, known as "Amira"

The Kavarna massacre (Bulgarian: Каварненското клане), also known as the Kavarna rebellion (Bulgarian: Каварненското въстание), refers to the near one-month (7 July [O.S. 25 June] 1877–8 August [O.S. 27 July] 1877) defence of the Black Sea town of Kavarna by its citizens and some 10,000 refugees from nearby villages against a band of 3,000 Circassian paramilitaries.

Even though Kavarna's defence was ultimately unsuccessful, with some 1,000 civilian casualties and half the town burned to the ground, the uprising is famous for both its fierce, implacable resistance and the sheer number of different ethnicities that took part in it: Bulgarians, Gagauzes, Greeks, Armenians and even the local Muslim Turkish population.

== Course of events ==
=== Background ===
The Russian army's crossing of the Danube at Măcin caused an exodus of Dobrudja's Muslim population of Turks, Tatars and Circassians. As they were moving south, bands of Circassian paramilitaries (bashi-bazouk) started looting Christian Bulgarian, Gagauz etc. villages in South Dobruja, and their inhabitants ran down to Kavarna to seek shelter. Citizens repeatedly telegraphed the Ottoman administration in Balchik, requesting help, but were advised to defend themselves until help arrives.

=== Defence ===
Thus, the local population of Bulgarians, Gagauz and Greeks took to fortifying the town themselves under the leadership of a local dignitary, Andrey Dimitrov, commonly known as Amira. As somewhat of an exception, the local Turkish population also participated in the fortification works and helped distribute firearms to the Christians. However, most Turks eventually managed to lease a boat to take them to Istanbul.

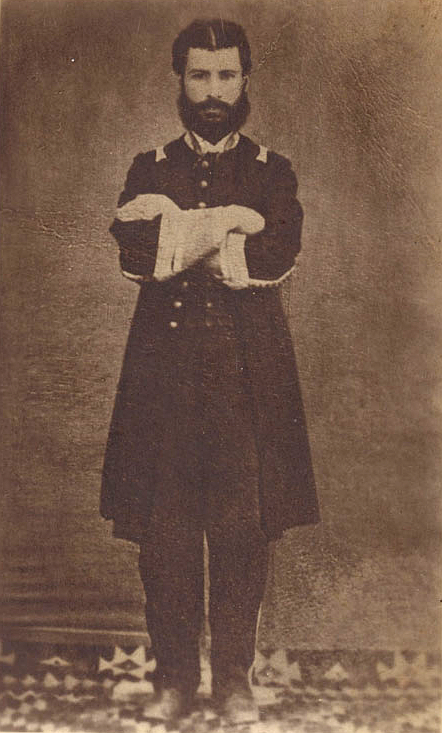
Eranos Eranosyan, Ottoman military telegraphist in Balchik, who helped rescue the remaining insurgents in Kavarna

By the time an Ottoman military unit arrived from Balchik, the town had been under siege by 2,000 or 3,000 Circassians (depending on source) for three days. The Kurdish commander of the Ottoman detachment, Mahmad-Ali, proposed that the residents pay the Circassians a danegeld of 60,000 piastres in exchange for the withdrawal of the Circassians. However, while the negotiations were still ongoing, the Circassians attacked the town's representatives, killing two of them, and then all havoc broke loose.

The Circassians managed to penetrate into the low-lying parts of the town. A large number of the refugees ran off to hide into the nearby vineyards and caves, while the battle for the upper part of Kavarna went on for days. The town was saved from full annihilation by the Ottoman Armenian telegraphist in Balchik, Eranos Eranosyan, who, in violation of his marching orders, contacted the foreign consulates and alerted them of what was going on.

=== Relief ===
Thanks to the foreign consulates, relief finally came at the end of July in the form of two Ottoman battleships with a detachment of Arab dragoons, which took many of the survivors to Balchik. However, Eranosyan did not live to see the fruit of his insubordination—a "stray" bullet hit him on the ship's entry to Kavarna's port.

A large part of the refugees, approx. 3,000 people, for whom there was no room on the battleships, hid in the fortress of Kaliakra. When the battleships returned on 8 August [O.S. 27 July] 1877, they were gone. Only 20 Circassians ended up in jail despite the nearly total devastation of the town.

The number of victims is estimated to be in the range of 1,000.

== See also ==
- Ottoman Bulgaria
- Ottoman Empire
- List of massacres in Ottoman Bulgaria
- The Terror (Karlovo massacre)
- Batak massacre
- Boyadzhik massacre
- Stara Zagora massacre
