= Christianity in the Ottoman Empire =

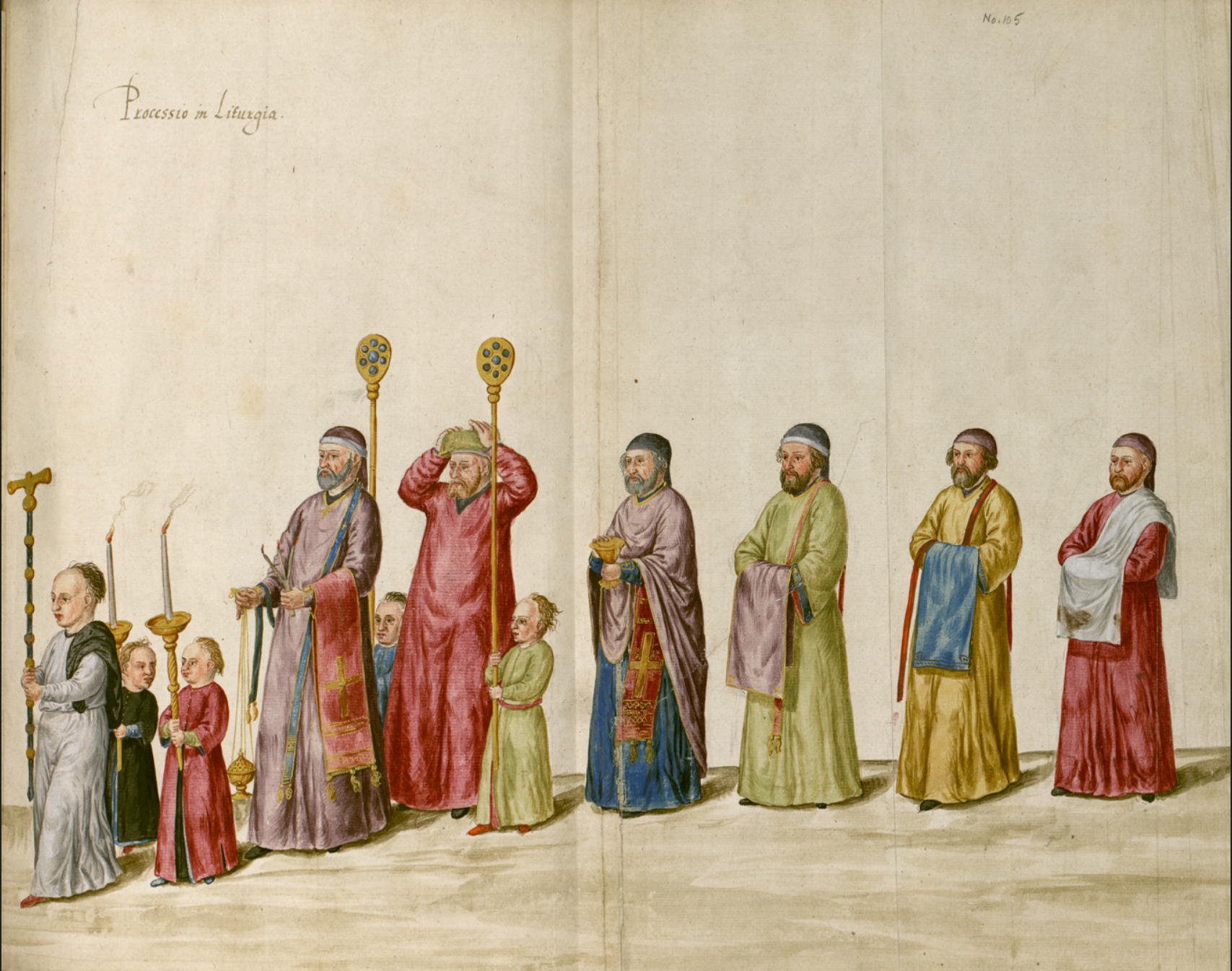
Christian liturgical procession from the Ottoman Empire, depicted by Lambert de Vos in 1574

Under the Ottoman Empire's millet system, Christians were considered dhimmi (meaning "protected") under Ottoman law in exchange for loyalty to the state and payment of the jizya tax.

Orthodox Christians were the largest non-Muslim group. With the rise of Imperial Russia, the Russians became a kind of protector of the Orthodox Christians in the Ottoman Empire.

Conversion to Islam in the Ottoman Empire involved a combination of individual, family, communal and institutional initiatives and motives. The process was also influenced by the balance of power between the Ottomans and the neighboring Christian states. However, most Ottoman subjects in Eastern Europe remained Orthodox Christian, such as Greeks, Serbs, Romanians, Bulgarians, while present-day Albania, Bosnia, and Kosovo had larger Muslim populations as a result of Ottoman influence.

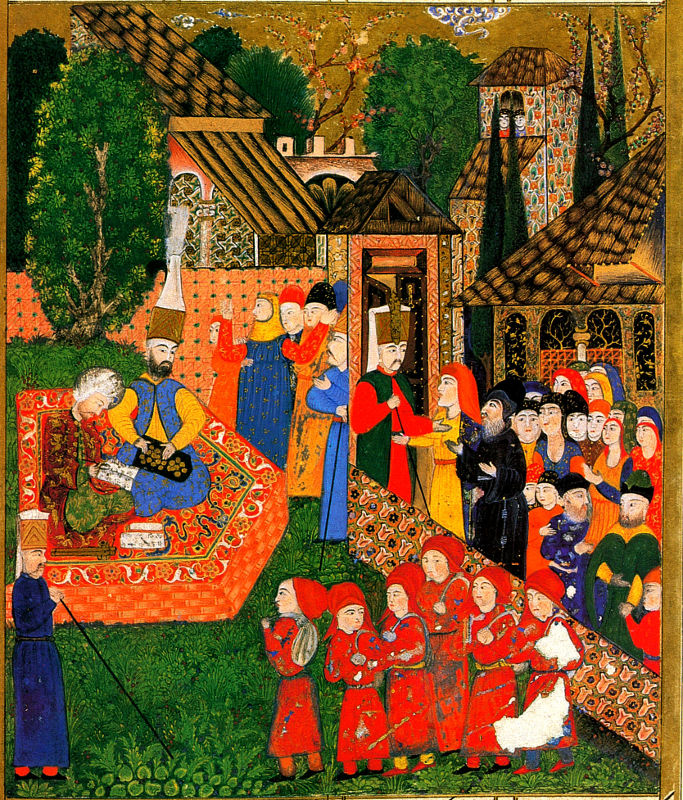
Ottoman official registering Christian boys for the devşirme. Ottoman miniature painting from the Süleymanname, 1558

== Civil status ==
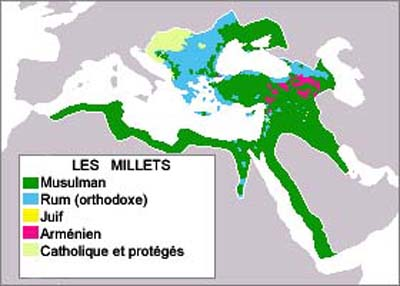
Map of prevailing religions in the territories of the Ottoman Empire in the late 16th century.

Under Ottoman rule, dhimmis (non-Muslim subjects) were allowed to "practice their religion, subject to certain conditions, and to enjoy a measure of communal autonomy" (see: Millet) and guaranteed their personal safety and security of property. In exchange for the guarantee of said security, citizens who fell under the category dhimmis paid a jizya, which was a tax exclusive to dhimmis. In addition, Dhimmis had certain rules to follow that other Muslim citizens did not. For example, Dhimmis were forbidden from even attempting to convert Muslim citizens to their religious practice, and during some periods, the state decreed that people of different millets should wear specific colors of, for instance, turbans and shoes — a policy that was not, however, always followed by Ottoman citizens. The Ottoman Empire was therefore not a state with legal equality of religions, non-Muslims were inferior, legally, to Muslims. While recognizing this inferior status of dhimmis under Ottoman rule, Bernard Lewis, professor emeritus of Near Eastern Studies at Princeton University, argues that, in most respects, their position was "very much easier than that of non-Christians or even of heretical Christians in medieval (Catholic) Europe." For example, dhimmis rarely faced martyrdom or exile, or forced compulsion to change their religion, and with certain exceptions, they were free in their choice of residence and profession.

== Religion as an Ottoman institution ==
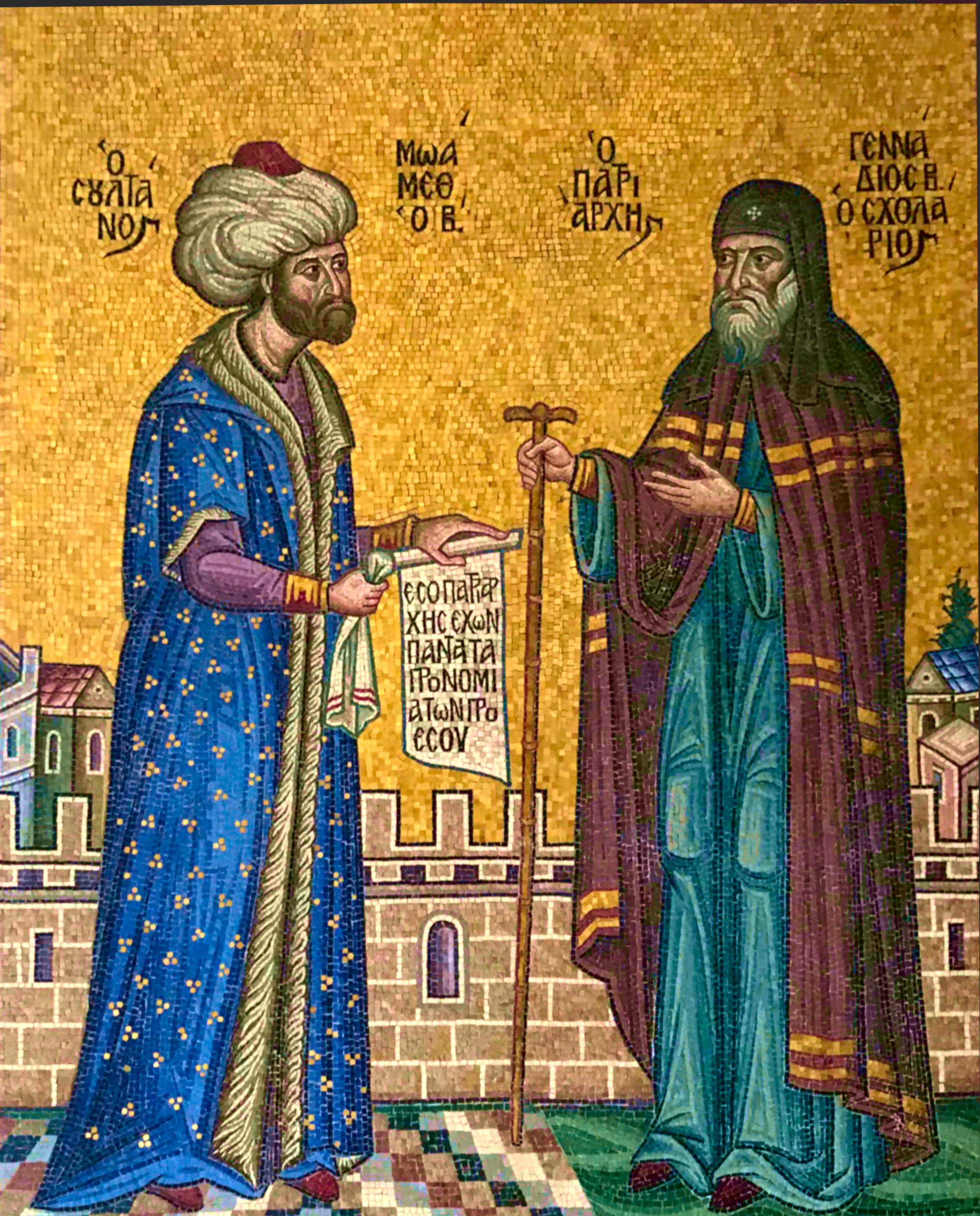
Mehmed the Conqueror receives Gennadius II Scholarius (Ecumenical Patriarch of Constantinople from 1454 to 1464)

The Ottoman Empire constantly formulated policies balancing its religious problems. The Ottomans recognized the concept of clergy and its associated extension of religion as an institution. They brought established policies (regulations) over religious institutions through the idea of "legally valid" organizations.

The state's relationship with the Greek Orthodox Church was mixed, since the Orthodox were not killed, they were, in the beginning, the vast majority and taxpayers, they were encouraged through bribes and exemptions to convert to Islam. In turn, they could not proselytize Muslims. The church's structure was kept intact and largely left alone (but under close control and scrutiny) until the Greek War of Independence of 1821–1831 and, later in the 19th and early 20th centuries, during the rise of the Ottoman constitutional monarchy, which was driven to some extent by nationalistic currents. Other churches, like the Serbian Patriarchate of Peć (1766) and Archbishopric of Ohrid (1767), were dissolved and their dioceses placed under the jurisdiction of the Ecumenical Patriarchate of Constantinople.

Eventually, Capitulations of the Ottoman Empire (contracts with European powers) were negotiated, protecting the religious rights of Christians within the Empire. The Russians became formal protectors of the Eastern Orthodox groups in 1774, the French of the Catholics, and the British of the Jews and other groups.

=== Conversion ===
Historians Apostolos Vakalopoulos and Dimitar Angelov give assessment on the first Ottoman invasions of Europe and their imposition of Islam to the Native Balkan Christians:

There is insufficient documentation of the process of conversion to Islam in Anatolia before the mid-15th century. By that time it was about 85% complete according to an Ottoman census, although it lagged in some regions such as Trabzon. In the Balkans, the general trend of conversion started slowly in the 14th century, reached its peak in the 17th century, and gradually petered out by the end of the 18th century, with significant regional variations. Conversion of Christians (and Jews) continued till the very end of the Emprire in early 20th century.

The earliest converts to Islam came from the ranks of the Balkan nobility and military elites, who helped the Ottomans administer their native provinces. Although conversion was not required to obtain these posts, over time these local ruling elites tended to adopt Islam. Some scholars view proselyting Sufi mystics and the Ottoman state itself as important agents of conversion among broader populations. Other scholars argue that intermarriage and professional patronage networks were the most important factors of the religious transformation of the broader society. According to Halil İnalcık, the wish to avoid paying the jizya was an important incentive for conversion to Islam in the Balkans, while Anton Minkov has argued that it was only one among several motivating factors.

From the late 14th to the mid-17th century, the Ottomans pursued a policy of imposing a levy of male children (devşirme) on their Christian subjects in the Balkans with the goal of supplying the Ottoman state with capable soldiers and administrators. The compulsory conversion to Islam which these boys underwent as part of their education is the only documented form of systematic forced conversion organized by the Ottoman state.

For strategic reasons, the Ottomans forcibly converted Christians living in the frontier regions of Macedonia and northern Bulgaria, particularly in the 16th and 17th centuries. Those who refused were either executed or burned alive.

According to Islamic law, the religion of the children was automatically changed after their parents converted. Many families collectively converted and their petitions as per Islamic customs for monetary help to the Ottoman Imperial Council are known. As marriages between non-Muslim men and Muslim women were forbidden under Sharia law, the refusal of husband to convert to Islam resulted in a divorce and the wife gaining custody of the children. Seventeenth-century sources indicate that non-Muslim women throughout the empire used this method to obtain a divorce.

The Ottomans tolerated Protestant missionaries within their realm, so long as they limited their proselytizing to the Orthodox Christians. With the increasing influence of Western powers and Russia in the 18th century, the process of conversion slowed down, and the Ottomans were pressured to turn a blind eye to re-conversion of many of their subjects to Christianity, although apostasy was de jure prohibited under penalty of death.

== Religion and the legal system ==
The main idea behind the Ottoman legal system was the "confessional community". The Ottomans tried to leave the choice of religion to the individual rather than imposing forced classifications. However, there were grey areas.

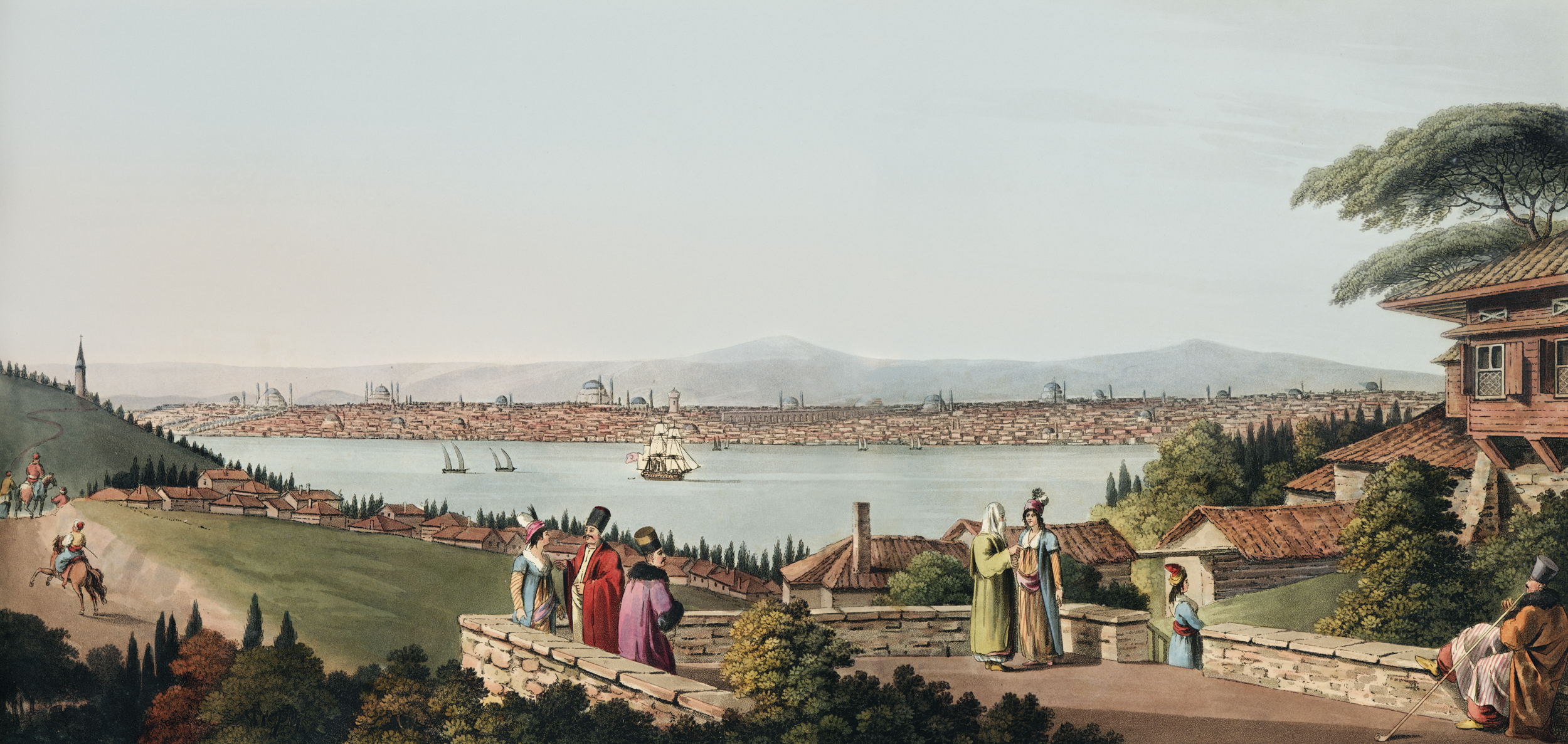
Ottoman Greeks in Constantinople, painted by Luigi Mayer

Ottoman practice assumed that law would be applied based on the religious beliefs of its citizens. However, the Ottoman Empire was organized around a system of local jurisprudence. Legal administration fit into a larger schema balancing central and local authority. The jurisdictional complexity of the Ottoman Empire aimed to facilitate the integration of culturally and religiously different groups.

There were three court systems: one for Muslims, another for non-Muslims (dhimmis), involving appointed Jews and Christians ruling over their respective religious communities, and the "trade court". Dhimmis were allowed to operate their own courts following their own legal systems in cases that did not involve other religious groups, capital offences, or threats to public order. Christians were liable in a non-Christian court in specific, clearly defined instances, for example the assassination of a Muslim or to resolve a trade dispute.

The Ottoman judicial system institutionalized a number of biases against non-Muslims, such as barring non-Muslims from testifying as witnesses against Muslims. At the same time, non-Muslims "did relatively well in adjudicated interfaith disputes", because anticipation of judicial biases prompted them to settle most conflicts out of court.

In the Ottoman Empire of the 18th and 19th centuries, dhimmis frequently used the Muslim courts not only when their attendance was compulsory (for example in cases brought against them by Muslims), but also in order to record property and business transactions within their own communities. Cases were brought against Muslims, against other dhimmis and even against members of the dhimmi's own family. Dhimmis often took cases relating to marriage, divorce and inheritance to Muslim courts so that they would be decided under shari'a law. Oaths sworn by dhimmis in the Muslim courts were sometimes the same as the oaths taken by Muslims, sometimes tailored to the dhimmis’ beliefs. Some Christian sources points that although Christians were not Muslims, there were instances which they were subjected to shari'a law. According to some western sources, "the testimony of a Christian was not considered as valid in the Muslim court as much as the testimony of a Muslim".

== Persecution ==
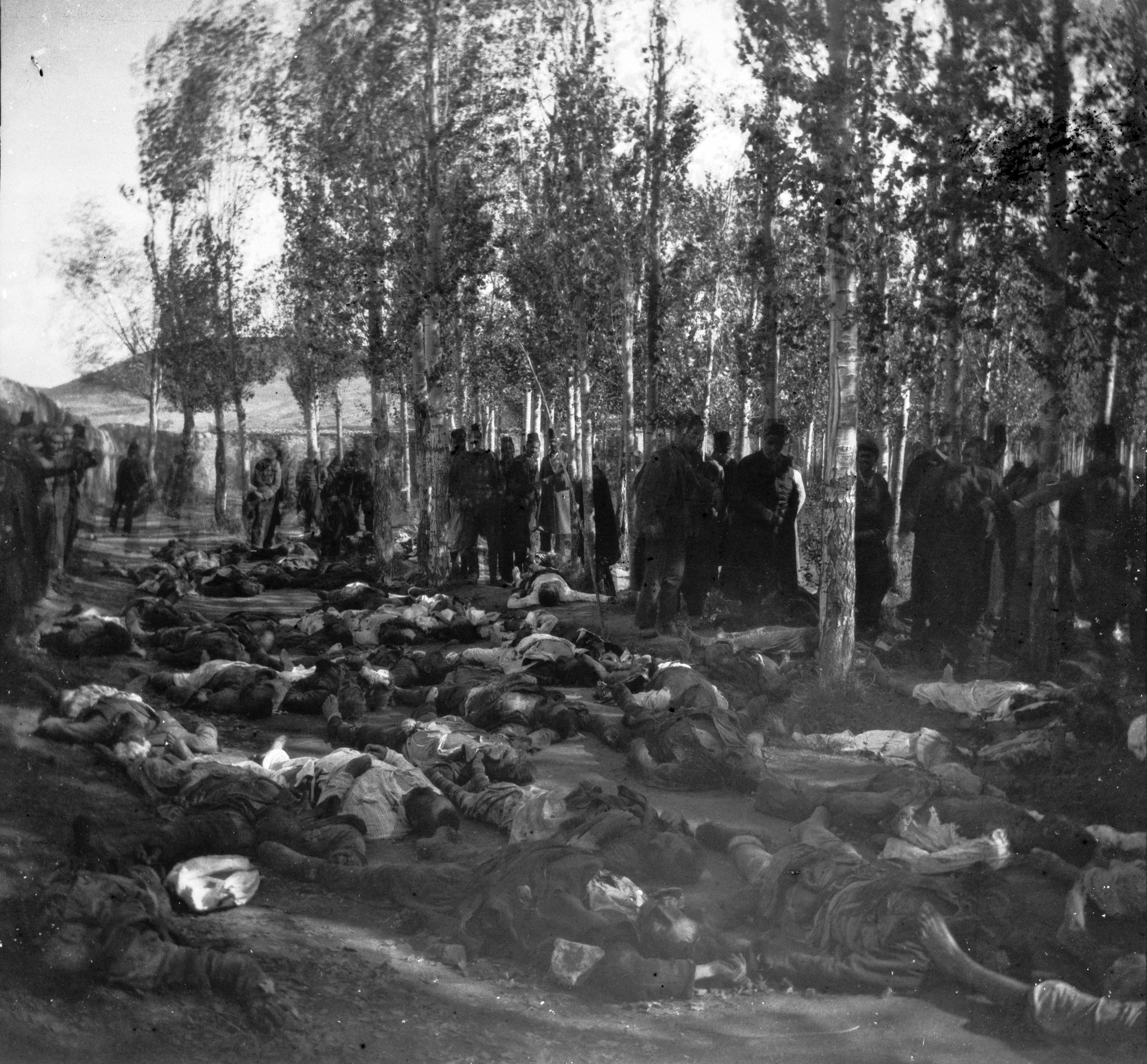
A photograph taken of the Hamidian massacres, 1895. It is estimated that between 200,000 and 300,000 Christians lost their lives.

The Ottoman Empire's treatment of its Christian subjects varied during its history. During the golden age of the empire, the millet system promised its Christian subjects better treatment than non-Christian populations experienced in Christian Europe, while during the decline and fall of the empire, the Christian minorities suffered a number of atrocities. Notable cases of persecution include the Constantinople massacre of 1821, the Chios massacre, the Destruction of Psara, the Batak massacre, the Hamidian massacres, the Adana massacre, the ethnic cleansing of Thracian Bulgarians in 1913, the Great Famine of Mount Lebanon and the Armenian genocide, Greek genocide and Assyrian genocide, all of which occurred during the Greek War of Independence or during the last few decades of the empire under the influence of Pan-Turkism. The share of non-Muslims in areas within Turkey's current borders declined from 20 to 22% in 1914, or approximately 3.3.–3.6 million people, to around 3% in 1927. Some Christians in the Empire also suffered the injustice of being forced in a status of concubinage.

In the time of the Austro-Turkish war (1683–1699), relations between Muslims and Christians who lived in the European provinces of the Ottoman Empire gradually deteriorated and this deterioration in interfaith relations occasionally resulted in calls for the expulsion or extermination of local Christian communities by some Muslim religious leaders. As a result of Ottoman discrimination, Serbian Christians and their church leaders, headed by Serbian Patriarch Arsenije III, sided with the Austrians in 1689 and again in 1737 under Serbian Patriarch Arsenije IV. In the following punitive campaigns, Ottoman forces conducted atrocities against the Christian population in the Serbian regions, resulted in the Great Migrations of the Serbs.

== Devşirme ==
Beginning with Murad I in the 14th century and extending through the 17th century, the Ottoman Empire employed devşirme system. This was the Ottoman practice of forcibly recruiting soldiers and bureaucrats from among the children of their Balkan Christian subjects and raising them in the religion of Islam.

== Taxation ==
Taxation from the perspective of dhimmis was "a concrete continuation of the taxes paid to earlier regimes" and from the point of view of the Muslim conqueror was a material proof of the dhimmis' subjection. Christians were forced to pay disproportionately higher taxes than Muslims within the empire, including the humiliating poll-tax. Even pregnant mothers had to pay jizya on behalf of their unborn children. In Aleppo in 1683, French Consul Chevalier Laurent d'Arvieux noted that ten-year-old Christian children were forced to pay the jizya. Jizya collected from Christian and Jewish communities was among the main sources of tax income of the Ottoman treasury.

== Religious architecture ==
The Ottoman Empire regulated how its cities would be built (quality assurances) and how the architecture (structural integrity, social needs, etc.) would be shaped.

Prior to the Tanzimat (a period of reformation beginning in 1839), special restrictions were imposed concerning the construction, renovation, size and the bells in Orthodox churches. For example, an Orthodox church's bell tower had to be slightly shorter than the minaret of the largest mosque in the same city. Hagia Photini in İzmir was a notable exception, as its bell tower was the tallest landmark of the city by far. They also needed not exceed mosques in grandeur or elegance. Only some churches were allowed to be built, but this was considered suspect, and some churches even fell into disrepair.

== See also ==
- History of the Eastern Orthodox Church under the Ottoman Empire
- Christianity in Turkey

== Sources ==
- Cohen, Mark R. (1995). Under Crescent and Cross: The Jews in the Middle Ages. Princeton University Press. ISBN 978-0-691-01082-3.
- Frazee, Charles A. (2006) [1983]. Catholics and Sultans: The Church and the Ottoman Empire 1453-1923. Cambridge: Cambridge University Press. ISBN 9780521027007.
- Lewis, Bernard (1984). The Jews of Islam. Princeton University Press. ISBN 978-0-691-00807-3.
- Lewis, Bernard (1999). Semites and Anti-Semites: An Inquiry Into Conflict and Prejudice. W. W. Norton & Company press. ISBN 978-0-393-31839-5.
- Lewis, Bernard (2002). The Arabs in History. Oxford: Oxford University Press. ISBN 978-0-19-280310-8.
- Pavlowitch, Stevan K. (2002). Serbia: The History behind the Name. London: Hurst & Company. ISBN 9781850654773.
