= Harmanli massacre =

Massacre of Ottoman Muslim civilians perpetrated by Russian and Bulgarian forces

- Part of the Russo-Turkish War (1877–1878)
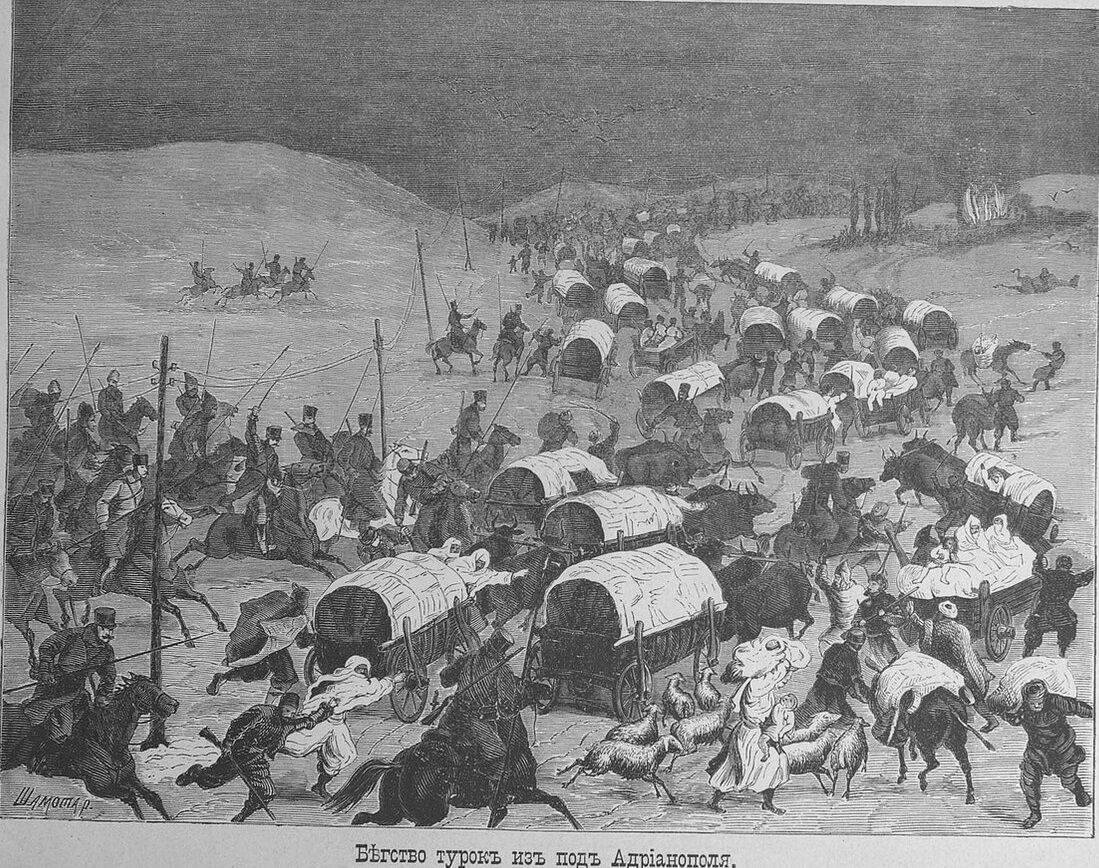
- Russian cavalry attacking a column of Turkish refugees near Adrianople
- Location: Near Harmanli, Adrianople Vilayet, Ottoman Empire
- Date: 16–17 January 1878
- Target: Turks, muslim civilians
- Deaths: 2,000 to 5,000
- Perpetrators: (Russia) Russian Imperial Army; Bulgarian collaborators

The Harmanli massacre (Turkish: Harmanlı Katliamı; Bulgarian: Харманлийско клане; Russian: Резня в Харманли) refers to the mass killing of Muslim civilians near Harmanli in early 1878, during the Russo-Turkish War (1877–1878). Approximately 2,000 to 5,000 Muslim civilians (mostly Turks) were murdered by the Russian army and Bulgarian collaborators.

After Suleiman Pasha's defeat at Plovdiv, his scattered troops retreated through the Rhodope Mountains and down the Maritsa valley, accompanied by large and chaotic groups of Turkish refugees. The column of refugees numbered approximately 150,000 or 200,000, people, consisting of an immense caravan with over 20,000 wagons, were retreating from Plovdiv. After the Russian success at the Battle of Sheynovo, the South Russian Detachment proceeded to Adrianople and encountered this column in the vicinity of Harmanli.

On 16–17 January 1878, a reconnaissance Russian squadron east of Harmanli encountered a large column of 30,000 muslim refugees accompanied by scattered Ottoman army detachments. The front of the column consisted of regular Ottoman army detachments.

On 17 January a Russian squadron entered Harmanli and let through the town's railroad station a train in which Ottoman generals travelled to peace talks with the Russian chief commander Nikolay Nikolayevich. Shortly after the train left Harmanli, Turks from the column set the railway bridge on the Maritsa river on fire and used carts from the column to block the road bridge. Russian forces cleared the road bridge and proceeded further on the road to Cisr-i Mustafapaşa (now Svilengrad). After the incident, the Russian field commander expressed his astonishment of the Turks' actions in a telegram to the commanding officer - General Mikhail Skobelev, given the central Ottoman authorities' efforts to conclude a truce (which was ultimately done on 19 January). On 19 January a Russian regiment received orders to clear the surroundings of Harmanli of the refugees and the remaining Ottoman forces in order to free up the road to Adrianople. Based on the Russian version of the events, upon approaching the column, the Russian forces were shot at by Turks hiding behind carts. During the Turks' flight, some of them encountered and burnt down the Christian village Devraliy. Based on the Turkish version of the events, the column was attacked by Russian troops. The column broke up and dispersed, the able-bodied portion of the caravan fled toward the mountains, the old, the sick and the very young who were left behind perished in the freezing weather. The old men who remaining in the carts were massacred by the Russians. A group of Muslims were overtaken at Sarambey (present day Septemvri) by Russian troops who seized all of their possessions and carried off the young women. The greater part of the caravan was also plundered by the Bulgarians of neighbouring villages, massacring the remaining refugees who were not strong enough to flee into the mountains.

After the column's dispersing, the Russian commander General Mikhail Skobelev arrived at the scene, accompanied by Western military correspondents. The French journalist Dick de Lonlay described the aftermath of the battle. General Skobelev ordered a small Russian detachment to collect the remaining supplies and surviving refugees (including children) and bring them back to Harmanli. Children were handed to Harmanli's mayor who took care of their feeding. The ameliorative measures taken by the Russians were recorded in Skobelev's telegram to the commander of the Russian 30th Infantry Division.

== See also ==
- List of massacres in Bulgaria
- Accounts and papers of the House of Commons, 1878, page 62
- The Library magazine, 1880, page 141
