= Kalofer =

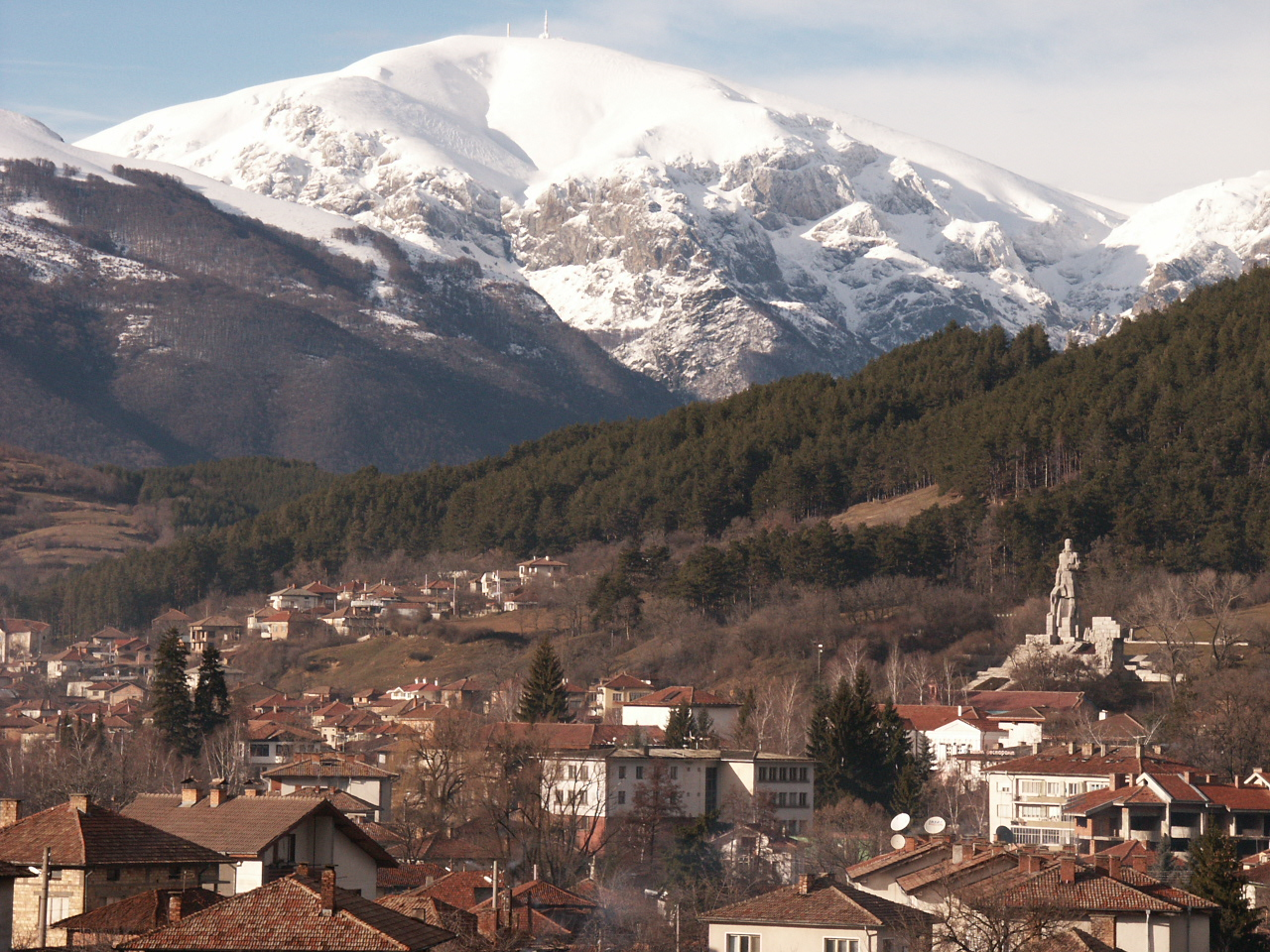
- Kalofer in winter

- Location of Kalofer
- Coordinates: 42°36′44″N 24°58′23″E
- Country: Bulgaria
- Provinces (Oblast): Plovdiv

Government
  - Mayor: Rumen Stoyanov
- Elevation: 666 m (2,185 ft)

Population (31.12.2022)
  - Total: 2 583
- Time zone: UTC+2 (EET)
  - Summer (DST): UTC+3 (EEST)
- Postal Code: 4370
- Area code: 03133

Kalofer (Bulgarian: Калофер pronounced:[kɐˈɫɔfɛr]) is a town in central Bulgaria, located on the banks of the Tundzha between the Balkan Mountains to the north and the Sredna Gora to the south. Kalofer is part of Plovdiv Province and the Karlovo municipality. It is best known as the birthplace of Bulgarian poet and revolutionary Hristo Botev.

The modern settlement of Kalofer emerged in the 16th century, managing to preserve its Bulgarian character in the Ottoman Empire and to develop as a centre of craftsmanship, primarily cord production. The Kalofer monastery has been in operation since 1640 and the convent since 1700. During the Bulgarian National Revival the town became a centre of revolutionary activity, being the birthplace of figures such as Hristo Botev, Exarch Joseph, Dimitar Panichkov, and Nikola Ivanov. Today, it is best known for the imposing Hristo Botev Monument (one of many in the country).

== Geography ==
Kalofer is located in the southern outskirts of Stara Planina. It is only 17 kilometers away from Karlovo, еlevation 603 m (1,978 ft), 22 km away from Sopot, 56 km away from Plovdiv, 222 km away from Burgas, 300 km away from Varna and 164 km from the capital of Bulgaria Sofia.

== History ==
Kalofer was founded in the 16th century (1533). From the very beginning, it enjoyed town privileges, which allowed it to preserve its typical Bulgarian character. At the height of its economic boom, some 1,200 devices for producing traditional colored Bulgarian wollen threads (gaitan) operated at the town. The town has been burnt down at least three times. Forestation has mostly covered traces from the damage, but they can still be found here and there.

With the passage of time, the residents of Kalofer devised their own methods of survival and cultivated a strength of character, which has remained their typical personality trait until today. Every single time the town was burnt, the people of Kalofer built it all over again, carrying stones from their own farming land, working through the night. Reconstruction activities usually started by re-building the church or the monastery.

In July 1877, an attack by Circassian bashi-bazouk led to the massacre of 618 Bulgarians from the town and the nearby villages, while the entire town was (yet again) burned to the ground, along with 1308 houses, 250 stores, 200 ginning undertakings and watermills and 1400 stables. Some 1,000 additional people lost their lives from exposure and the elements while climbing the Balkan Mountains in an attempt to reach Troyan.

== Religion ==
Kalofer has a number of churches and monasteries, many with church bells. On a small street is a convent for girls, inheriting four metochions, in which Anastasia Dimitrova, the first Bulgarian female teacher, was educated. The monastery for men has been open since 1640, and the convent for nuns since 1700. Today, both of them, despite the numerous burnings, are open for visitors.

== Economy ==
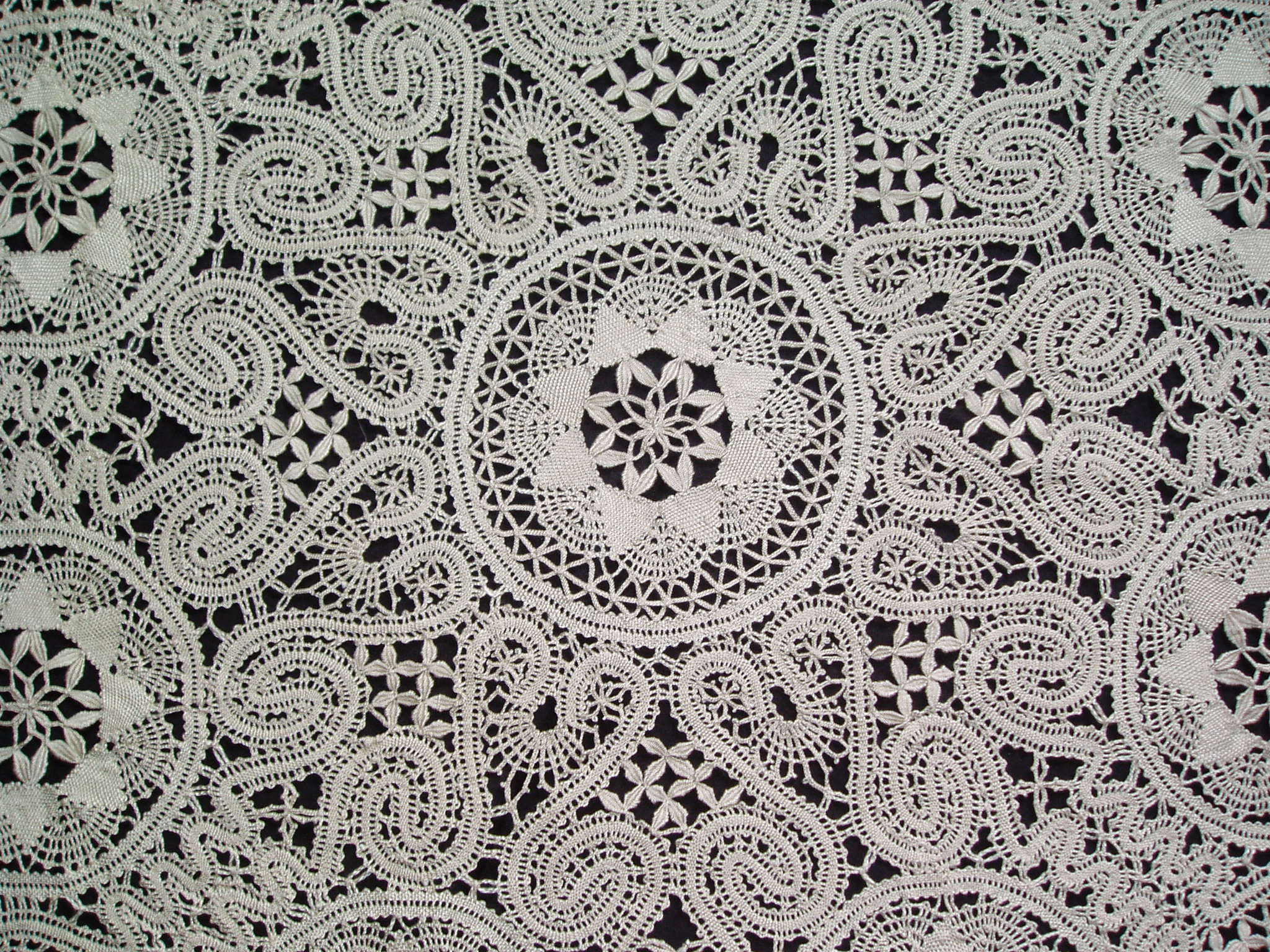
Kalofer Lace

In Kalofer typical Bulgarian customs and traditions have been well preserved over the centuries. A part of the attractions in the region is visiting ateliers producing the Kalofer lace or the traditional rugs or woolen covers (kitenitsi). The making of souvenirs, works of copper, barrels for wine, incrustrated knives, as well as the typical Bulgarian dishes are point of attraction.

== Amenities ==
There is no bank in Kalofer, but two bank branches are available. In the city center there are two automated teller machines.

The post office in Kalofer is open Monday to Friday, and there are shops and convenience stores in the area. Several shops are located in the center of the town, and there is a market on Thursdays.

== Annual events ==
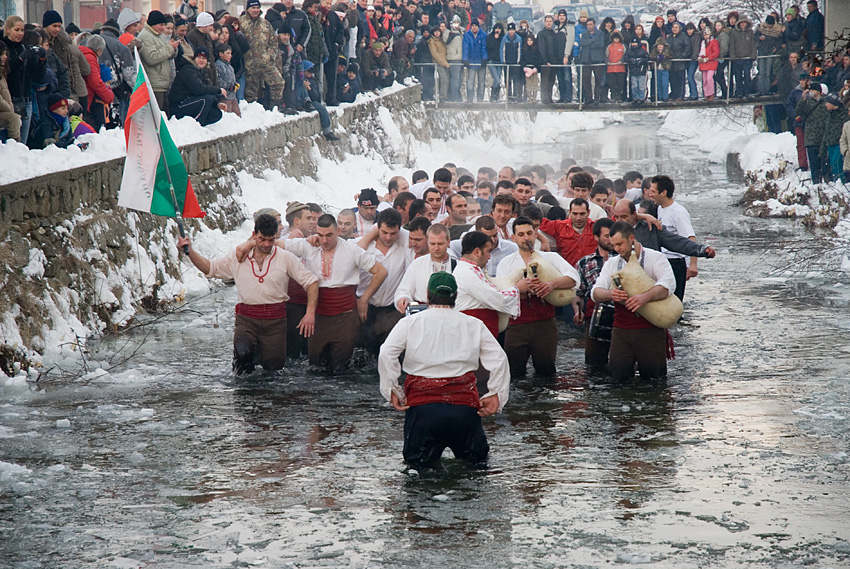
Kalofer is known in Bulgaria for the traditional Bulgarian all-male horo danced in the ice-cold river on Epiphany

- January 6: Birth of Hristo Botev and Epiphany (Yordanov Den).
- June 2: Day of Botev.
- August 15: Holiday of Kalofer Lace.

== Honour ==
Kalofer Peak on Livingston Island in the South Shetland Islands, Antarctica is named after Kalofer.

== Famous people ==
=== Revolutionaries ===
- Vidul Stranski
- Georgi Hristov, Bulgarian revolutionary from VMORO, Chetnik of Ivan Naumov Alyabaka
- Galab Voivoda (ca. 1838 - 1921)
- Dimitar Pashov (1882 -?), Participant in the Ilinden-Preobrazhensko uprising in the Edirne region with the detachment of Krastyo Bulgaria
- Ivan Degov Karlovets (1876 -?), Participant in the Ilinden-Preobrazhensko uprising in the Edirne region with the detachment of Krastyo Bulgaria
- Panko St. Parvanov (1875 -?), Participant in the Ilinden-Preobrazhensko uprising in the Edirne region with the detachment of Krastyo Bulgaria
- Stoyan Buynov (around 1839 - 1908)
- Stefan Kostov, revolutionary from VMORO, Chetnik of Nikola Ivanov
- Hristo Botev, poet and revolutionary (1848 - 1876)
- Hristo Stefanov (1866 -?), Activist of the IMRO, participant in the Ilinden-Preobrazhensko uprising in 1903 with the detachment of Ivan Varnaliev

=== Personalities of education, culture and arts ===
- Atanas Tinterov, professor of mathematics (1856 - 1927)
- Botyo Petkov from Karlovo, teacher (1815 - 1869)
- Dimitar Mutev, Odessa (1818 - 1864)
- Dimitar Panichkov, publisher and printer (c.1810 - 1909)
- Dimitar Fingov, teacher (1840 - 1912)
- Ivan Kozarev, teacher (1849 - 1933)
- Kostadin Bradinski, teacher (1847 -?)
- Nenko Koritarov, cultural figure, conductor, composer (ed. "The Blacksmith's Song"), member of the Union of Bulgarian Composers (UBC) (1925 - 2008)
- Nikola Kasapski, teacher, writer and translator (unknown - 1879)
- Nikola Batsarov, teacher (1881 - 1892)
- Nikola Nachov, writer and historian (1859 - 1940)
- Stefan Avramov, teacher (1862 - 1908)
- Stefan Kanchev, graphic artist (1915 - 2001)
- Stefan Botev, teacher (1854 - 1890)

== See also ==
- Kalofer massacre
