= List of massacres in Ottoman Bulgaria =

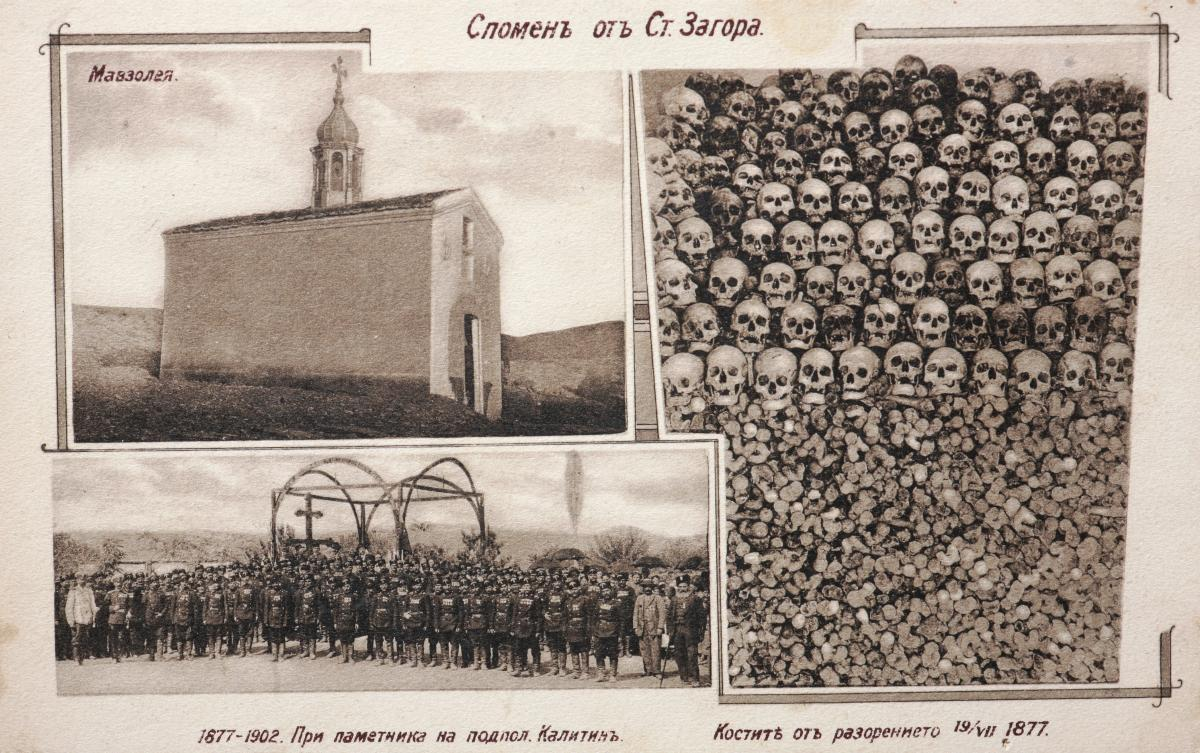
Remains from the Stara Zagora massacre

The following is a list of massacres that have occurred in Ottoman Bulgaria (1396–1878). All events and massacres should be notable and linked to the appropriate article; if no article exists for an individual massacre, references must be provided for the massacre. Names of massacres should follow the article titles; if none exists, a consensus of the massacre name in English language reliable sources should be used.

Event	Massacre name	Date	Perpetrator	Deaths	Target
April Uprising	Koprivshtitsa massacre	27–28 May 1876	local Bulgarians	70	Muslim Roma
April Uprising	Batak massacre	1876	Ottoman irregular troops	7,000	Bulgarian civilians
	Boyadzhik massacre	1876	Circassian paramilitaries (bashi-bazouk)	145	Bulgarian non-combatant civilians
Russo-Turkish War (1877–78)	Stara Zagora massacre	1877–78	Suleiman Pasha's Ottoman Army, composed mainly of 48,000 Albanian troops	14,500	Bulgarian civilians
Russo-Turkish War (1877–78)	The Terror (Karlovo massacre)	22–23 July 1877	Circassian paramilitaries	288	Bulgarian civilians
Russo-Turkish War (1877–78)	Kalofer massacre	26–28 July 1877	Circassian paramilitaries	1,600	Bulgarian civilians
Russo-Turkish War (1877–78)	Kavarna massacre	21 July–8 August 1877	Circassian paramilitaries	1,000	Bulgarian, Gagauz, Greek civilians
Russo-Turkish War (1877–78)	Kazanlak massacre	December 1877	Russian Empire, Bulgarians	1,751 killed, 54 injured, 173 abducted, 270 missing	Turkish civilians
Russo-Turkish War (1877–78)	Harmanli massacre	16–17 January 1878	Russian Empire, Bulgarians	2,000-5,000	Muslim civilians (mostly Turkish)
