= Late Ottoman genocides =

1913–1924 Armenian, Greek, and Assyrian genocides

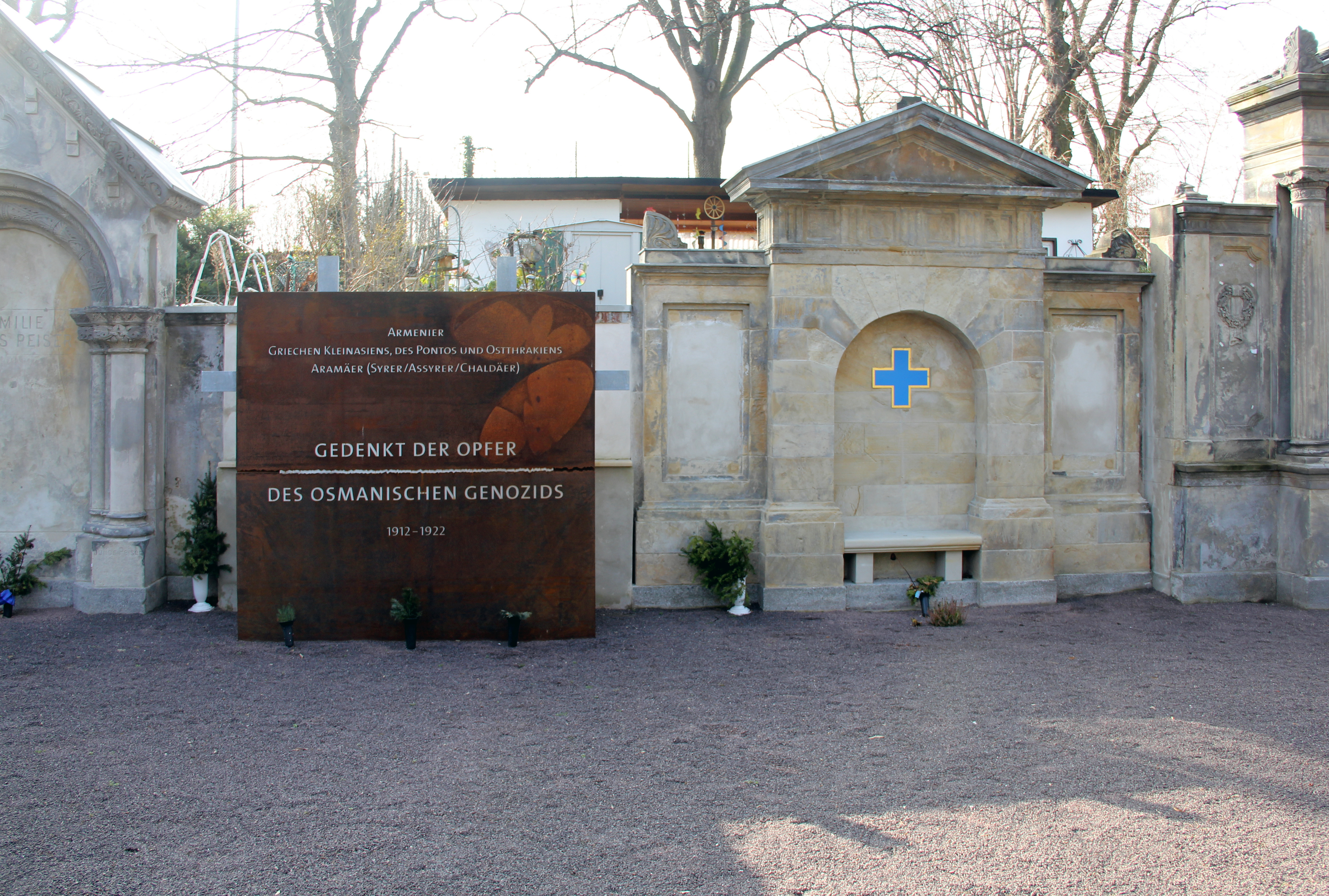
Monument in Berlin to the victims of Ottoman genocides of 1912–22. It names "Armenians", "Greeks of Asia Minor, Pontus and East Thrace" and "Aramaeans (Syriacs/Assyrian/Chaldeans)."

The late Ottoman genocides is a historiographical theory which sees the concurrent Armenian, Greek, and Assyrian genocides, that took place from the 1910s until the 1920s, as parts of a single event rather than separate events, which were initiated by the Young Turks. Although some sources, including The Thirty-Year Genocide (2019) written by the historians Benny Morris and Dror Ze'evi, characterize this event as a genocide of Christians, others such as those written by the historians Dominik J. Schaller and Jürgen Zimmerer contend that such an approach "ignores the Young Turks' massive violence against non-Christians", in particular against Muslim Kurds.

== Overview ==
Uğur Ümit Üngör, a Dutch–Turkish historian and professor of genocide studies, explains that the mass violence and enslavement which occurred in the late Ottoman Empire and its successor state includes, but is not limited to, the Adana massacre; the persecution of Muslims during Ottoman contraction; the Armenian, Greek, and Assyrian genocides; the 1921 Koçgiri massacres; "the mass violence against Kurds from the 1925 Sheikh Said conflict to the 1938 Dersim massacre"; the 1934 Thrace pogroms, through the 1955 Istanbul pogrom against Greek and Armenian Christians.

Other scholars sometimes also include the earlier Hamidian massacres of Christian Armenians in the 1890s or the deportations of Kurds between 1916 and 1934.

== See also ==
- Destruction of the Thracian Bulgarians
- 1915 genocide in Diyarbekir
- Great Famine of Mount Lebanon
- Massacres of Christians in the Later Ottoman Empire
