= Stara Zagora massacre =

Ottoman massacre of Bulgarian civilians

The Stara Zagora massacre (Bulgarian: Старозагорско клане) was the mass murder of approx. 14,000 civilian Bulgarians, accompanied by the burning and complete destruction of the City of Stara Zagora on 31 July–2 August [O.S. 19–21 July] 1877, committed by regular Ottoman troops commanded by Süleyman Hüsnü Pasha, during the Battle of Eski Zagra of the Russo-Turkish War (1877–1878).

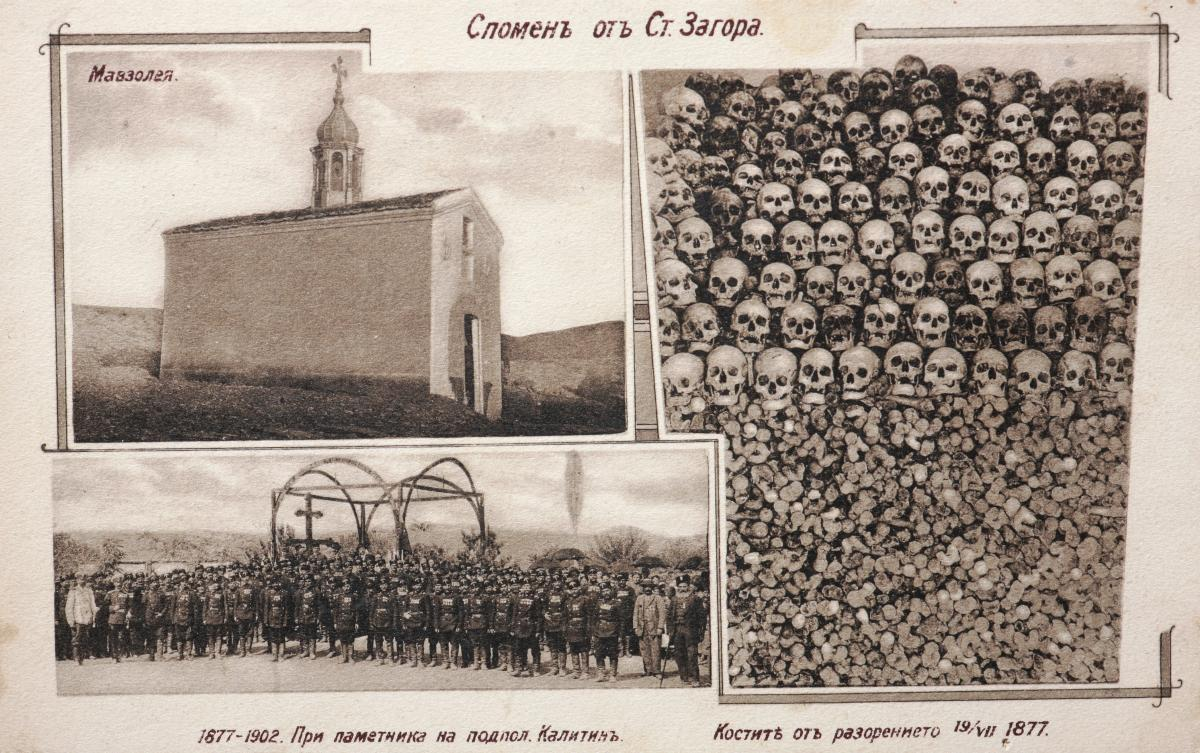
Skulls and bones of massacred Bulgarians at Stara Zagora (ethnic cleansing by the Ottoman Empire)

== Course of events ==
The relative obscurity of what is arguably the biggest war crime in modern Bulgarian history is owing to the series of grave tactical errors committed by Süleyman Pasha's Russian counterpart, General Iosif Gurko and his command staff, which make them largely complicit in what occurred.

After Kazanlak and Stara Zagora were liberated by Count Gurko's Advance Squad on 22 July [O.S. 10 July ] 1877, Stara Zagora's population quickly swelled to nearly 40,000 people, as refugees from nearby villages came to the city looking for protection, in their fear of reprisals from the Ottoman army and irregular Circassian bashi-bazouk units.

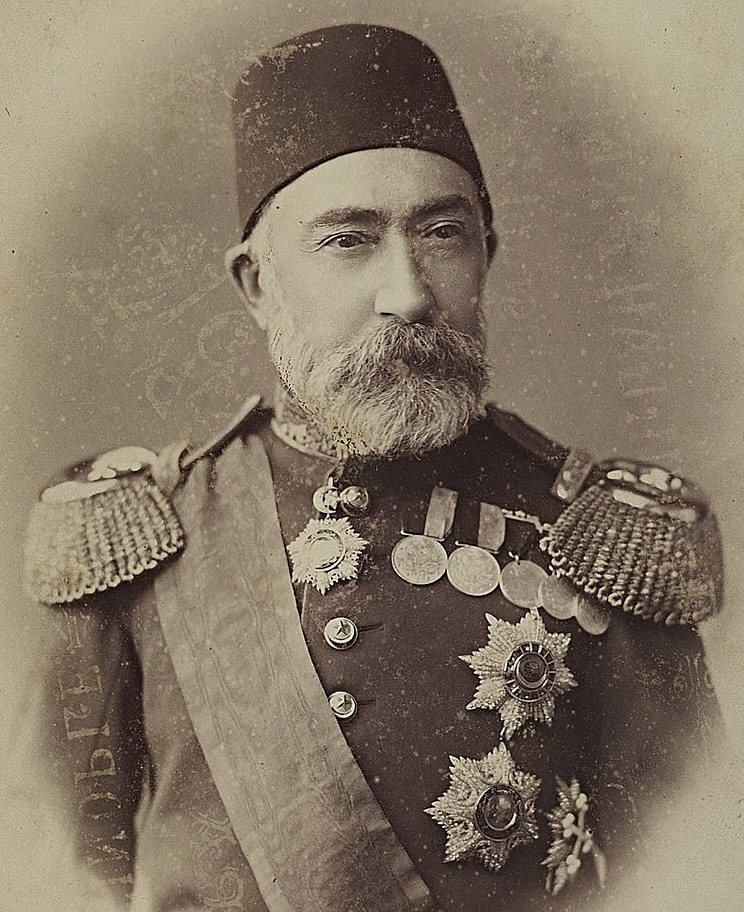
Süleyman Pasha — Commander of the Ottoman Army during the Battle of Eski Zagra

At the same time, several of Gurko's Cossack detachments engaged in demonstrative forays to nearby Sub-Balkan towns and villages. For example, such units "liberated" both Kalofer and Karlovo, twice, on 23 July [O.S. 10 July] 1877 and 27 July [O.S. 15 July] 1877 and 23 July [O.S. 11 July] 1877] and 29 July [O.S. 16 July] 1877, respectively, immediately withdrawing afterwards.

All these demonstrations eventually led to terrible results, as they attracted undesired attention: Karlovo was looted and sacked on 30 July [O.S. 18 July] 1877 by both regular Ottoman army and bashi-bazouk, with 288 civilian casualties, while Kalofer was looted and torched by Circassian paramilitaries on 7 August [O.S. 26 July] 1877, with 618 civilian casualties.

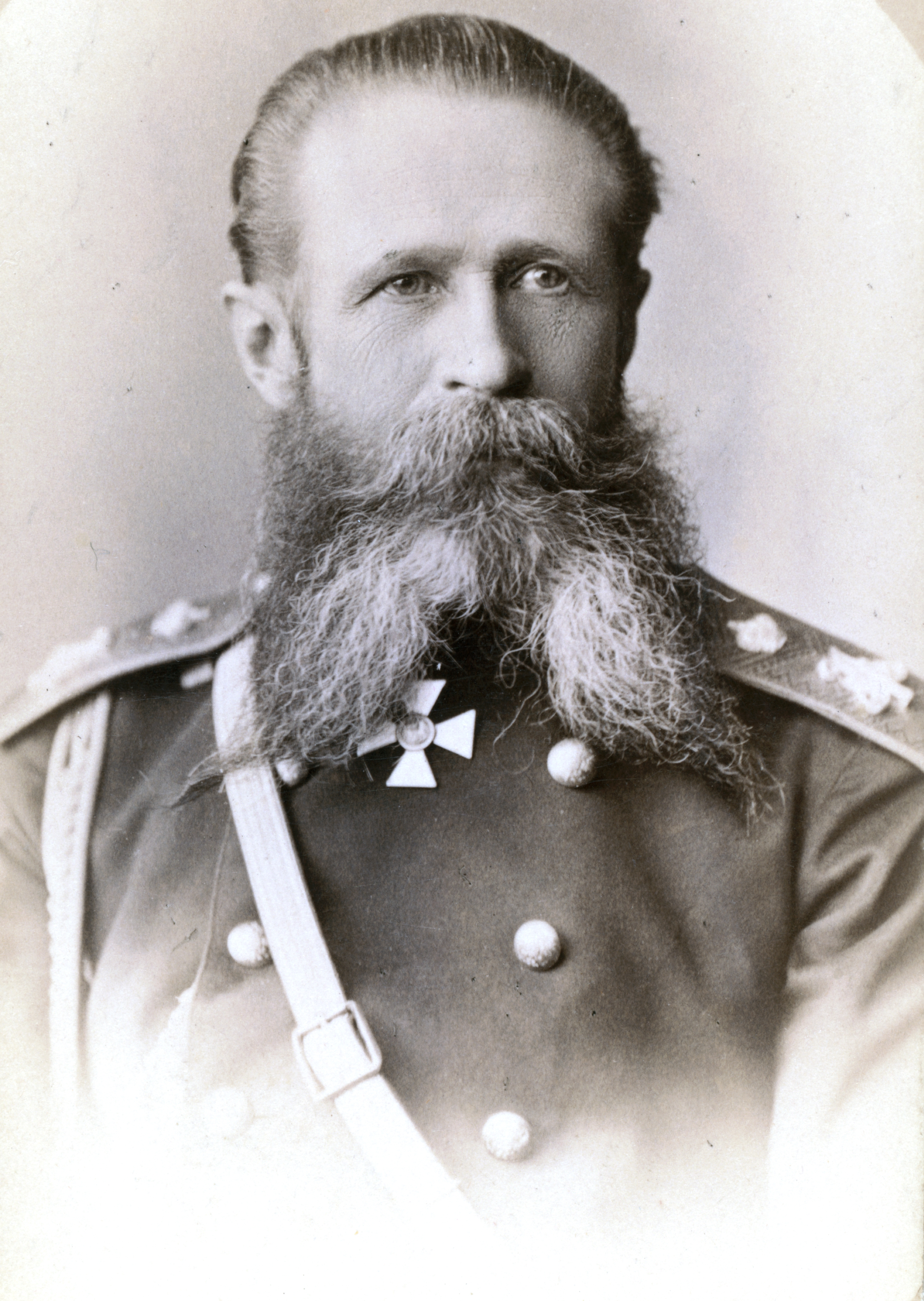
Count Gurko — Commander of the Russian Advance Squad, operating around Kazanlak, Stara Zagora, Nova Zagora, Kalofer, etc. in summer of 1877

In a similar fashion, even though it was public knowledge that Ottoman General Süleyman Pasha was heading towards Stara Zagora with an army of 48,000 soldiers, 4 times the strength of Gurko's Advance Squad, and even though the city kept filling up with panicked people, General Gurko did not order evacuation, but instead went on to liberate neighbouring Nova Zagora. Which he did on 29 July [O.S. 17 July] 1877 (one day later, Nova Zagora was torched, as well).

On his way back to Stara Zagora on 31 July [O.S. 19] 1877, he saw that the city was already under attack, with the skeleton garrison of Bulgarian volunteers suffering heavy losses, so he retreated towards the Hainboaz Pass.

Given the lack of enough defenders to ensure safe passage of civilians and the complete lack of preparation or prior warning, the refugees from Stara Zagora ended up between a rock and a hard place. Their flight was cut off by bashi-bazouk on the road to Kazanlak, leaving them the choice to head back into the fire, meet a sword, become a slave or try to run up the mountain dodging bullets.

By mid-August, the English press was already reporting "a complete massacre of all the male Bulgarians who have been found in Eski Zagra, Kazanlak and other places".

Several prominent Bulgarian historians, including, e.g., Plamen Mitev and Plamen Tzvetkov, have severely criticised the conduct of the Russian army, in particular, its demonstrative forays and the apparent complete lack of concern for the plight of civilians. In particular, Mitev, sees a correlation between the provocative conduct of the Russian army and the wave of violence observed by the civilian Bulgarian population in a number of Sub-Balkan towns and villages in the summer of 1877. Mitev has further criticised the reluctance among Bulgarian historians to objectively assess the Russian military campaign on the Balkans (and its effects on both Christian and Muslim civilian populations) and their tacit participation in Russian myth-making.

A good example of the latter is the Brief History of the War of Liberation, published in 1958, whose main purpose is to cement the myth of the valour and nobility of the "Russian liberators", largely at the expense of either objectivity or truth (here, in particular, referring to the "rescue" of a great deal of Stara Zagora's population by Count Gurko's units, which is a fiction):

"A great part of the Bulgarian population of Stara Zagora left with the Russian forces. And it was even here that the Russian soldier showed his heart and the greatness of his soul. Everybody helped according to their powers and ability. Some soldiers were carrying children, others helped put together belongings, and yet others were giving away their last biscuit to their "poor bratushkas".

Some officers adopted orphans, whose parents had been taken away. At dusk, stars shone brightly against the dark vault of the heavens, while there, above the capricious contours of the mountain, the glow of fire lit a crimson red. Wails died away in the distance.

According to Süleyman Pasha's brief, the Turks' losses in the battle amounted to 200 souls. Other, less reliable sources calculated them, at give-and-take, 1,500 souls. The other side also suffered heavy losses. The Bulgarian militia lost 572 souls alone. Lieutenant Colonel Kalitin's battalion suffered 210 casualties, which accounted for 37% of its personnel.

The Battle at Eski Zagra (Stara Zagora) was of great importance. Süleyman Pasha's victory made the Advance Squad leave Southern Bulgaria and withdraw to the Balkan Mountain Passes..."

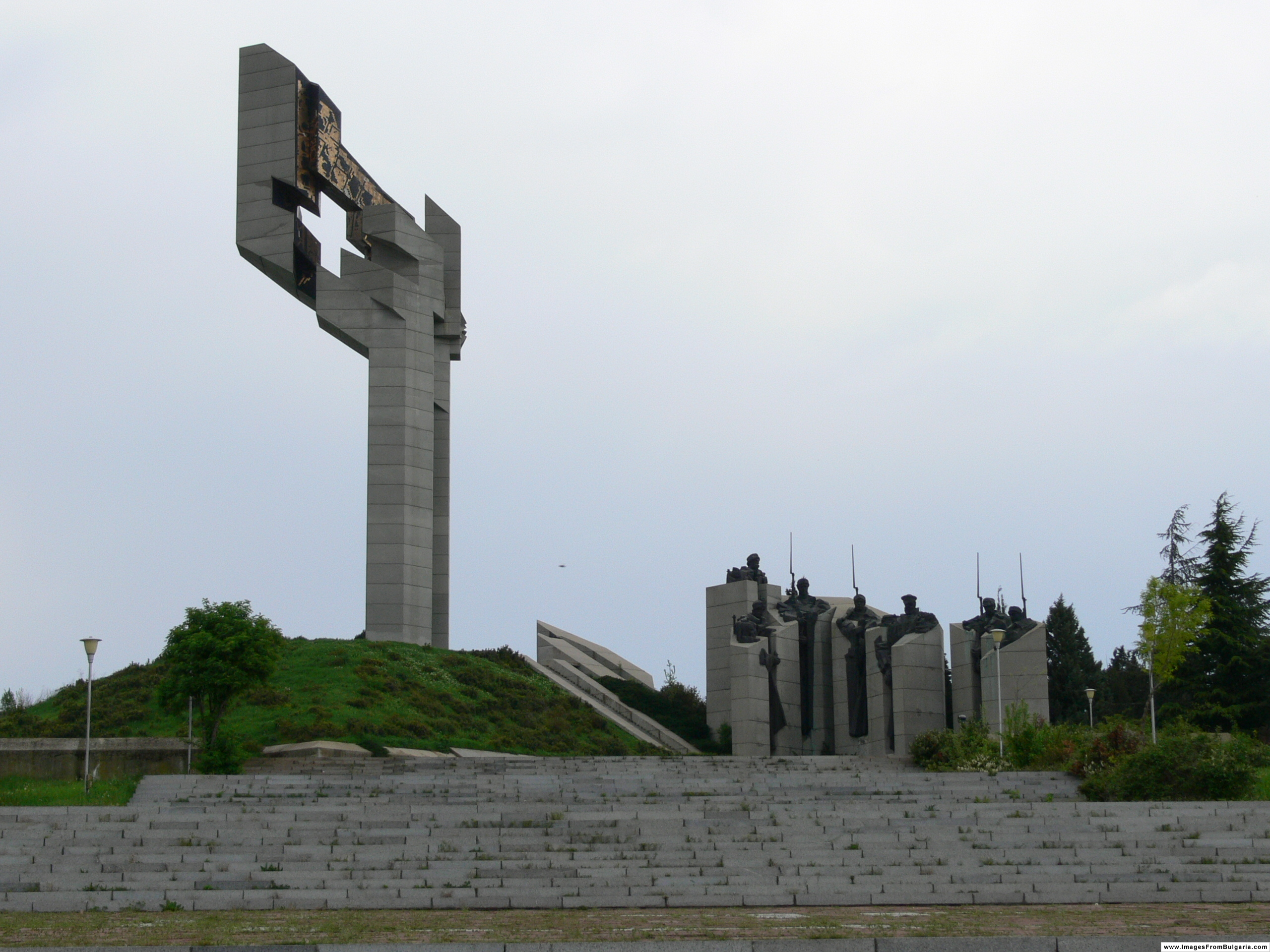
The Defenders of Stara Zagora

== Monument ==
An enormous monument called The Defenders of Stara Zagora has been erected near the city in honour of the Bulgarian Voluntary Corps militiamen, who fought until they ran out of ammunition. The monument is a major tourist attraction.

== See also ==
- Batak massacre
- Ottoman Bulgaria
- Ottoman Empire
- List of massacres in Ottoman Bulgaria
- The Terror (Karlovo massacre)
- Boyadzhik massacre

== Works cited ==
- Dimitrov, Georgi (1900). Княжество България в историческо, географическо и етнографическо отношение. Продължение от част ІІ. По руско-турската война през 1877-78 г. [Historical, Geographic and Ethnographic Data on the Principality of Bulgaria. Continued from Part II. On the Russo-Turkish War 1877-78] (in Bulgarian). Plovdiv. pp. 130–194.
- Seton-Watson, Robert William (1971). Disraeli, Gladstone, and the Eastern Question: A Study in Diplomacy and Party Politics. Psychology Press. ISBN 9780714615134.
- Georgiev, Georgi; Topalov, Vladislav (1958). "Battle at Eski Zagra". Кратка история на Освободителната война 1877–1878 [Brief History of the 1877–78 War of Liberation]. Sofia: Bulgarian Communist Party.
- Mitev, Plamen (2012), Българското Възраждане [The Bulgarian National Revival], Стандарт, ISBN 978-954-8976-56-5
