= Boyadzhik massacre =

Ottoman massacre of Bulgarian civilians

The Boyadzhik massacre (Bulgarian: Бояджишко клане) was the massacre of 145 Bulgarian civilians committed by irregular Ottoman troops in the Bulgarian village of Boyadzhik on and after 24 May [O.S. 11 May] 1876.

The massacre took place in the wake of the Bulgarian April Uprising, even though Boyadzhik did not participate in the insurrection and was located hundreds of kilometres away from the scene of any hostilities. The grandfather of the inventor of the first electronic digital computer, John Vincent Atanasoff, was among the victims.

== Massacre ==
The massacre took place on and after 11 May, when the villagers gathered to celebrate the Bulgarian Education and Culture and Slavonic Literature Day. A rumour made believe the local Ottoman administrator, Şefket paşa, that the villagers were going to rebel, and he dispatched a band of Circassian bashi-bazouk to Boyadzhik.

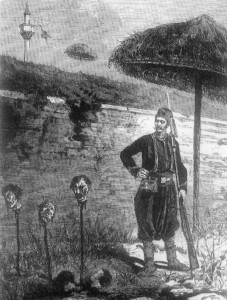
Ottoman bashi-bazouk, mid-1870s

The paramilitaries attacked the village from all sides. Unable to escape, they gathered in the local church, but were forced to come out after the bashi-bazouk started firing shells against it. An indiscriminate slaughter of men, women and children ensued afterwards.

The village was subsequently sacked and torched, and the Circassian paramilitaries divided the villagers' possessions amongst themselves. The surviving villagers eventually received relief from the American Protestant mission in Plovdiv.

The grandfather of John Atanasoff was one of the victims. In his memoirs, John Atanasoff writes:

My grandmother ran, while the child (my father) was in the hands of my grandfather ... a shot sounded ... one of the Turkish soldiers shot my grandfather right in the chest, he fell dead, a ricocheted bullet hurt my father and left a scar for the rest of his life, as a terrible reminder of those events.

There is a list of a total of 145 confirmed victims: women, children and men (of whom two Orthodox priests).

A fundraising campaign for a memorial to the victims was launched in 2019.

In his description of the April Uprising, American writer Justin McCarthy confuses the much smaller and unrelated "Boyadzhik massacre" (spelled "Boajic") with the biggest Ottoman atrocity committed at Batak, which caused an enormous public outcry in Europe (dubbed "The Bulgarian Horrors") and led to the Bulgarian autonomy proposal of 1876.

McCarthy is an Armenian Genocide denialist and a recipient of grants from the Institute of Turkish Studies. He has been criticised by many of his colleagues for attempting to whitewash Ottoman history.

== Plan to Attack Yambol ==
The nearby town of Yambol narrowly avoided the same fate on 24 May [O.S. 19 May] 1876, when it was encircled by the same band of bashi-bazouk led by Şefket paşa.

The town was saved by local Ottoman dignitary İsmail Hakkı Paşa, who ordered the paramilitary units to stand down and disband. İsmail Hakkı was of Crimean Tatar descent and hailed from the nearby village of Kabile.

One of his sons, Ahmet Tevfik Pasha, eventually went on to become the last Grand Vizier of the Ottoman Empire. When İsmail Hakkı Paşa died, he was buried in Yambol's mosque and had a monument built in honour of him. A street in Yambol bore his name until Bulgaria's occupation by the Soviet Union in 1944.

== See also ==
- April uprising
- Batak massacre
- The Terror (Karlovo massacre)
- Kalofer massacre
- Ottoman Empire
- List of massacres in Ottoman Bulgaria
