= Kalofer massacre =

Ottoman massacre of Bulgarian civilians

The Kalofer massacre (Bulgarian: Калоферското клане) was the massacre of a total of 618 civilian Bulgarians, accompanied by the looting and arson of the village of Kalofer, suffered in two waves at the hands of Circassian bashi-bazouk in the course of July 1877, as part of the Russo-Turkish War (1877-1878).

== Events ==
=== The Circassians ===
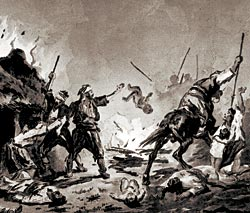
Ottoman bashi-bazouk, 1877

The town was initially surrounded by a bashi-bazouk unit led by Silimi Pasha, in the beginning of July 1877. The townsmen quickly collected a ransom of some 800 Ottoman lira and a hefty deal of the town's best rose oil. Evidently dissatisfied with the offer, the bashi-bozouk engaged in plunder and looting of the town until a messenger from Kazanlak got in touch with Russian Prince Aleksey Tsereteli, who managed to broker the withdrawal of the Circssians.

=== Russians ===
On 23 July [O.S. 10 July] 1877, approx. 37 Cossack soldiers and 30 Bulgarian volunteers came to Kalofer to help capture run-away Ottoman soldiers from the Ottoman defeat at the Shipka pass, Then the Russian forces left it to the citizens of Kalofer to capture the soldiers and turn them over to the Russians. This is yet another action of the Russian army that has been confronted with sharp criticism by Bulgarian historians, who have qualified it extremely irresponsible to make the citizens of Kalofer complicit in the war action, without pledging any form of formal defence.

And indeed, after arriving in greater numbers on 27 July [O.S. 15 July] 1877 and "liberating" the region, whereby Kalofer swelled to up to 30,000 people following the arrival of large numbers of nearby villagers, who were worried about their safety, the Russians forces, after learning of the Russian defeat at Stara Zagora, took off in the middle of the night on 20 July 1878. Thus, after entirely playing according to the Russian fiddle for two weeks, Kalofer ended up entirely without any defence—something that we will see happening at a number of other places, above all, in Stara Zagora, which seems to indicate that the Russian army was simply unable of thinking of protection of civilians as any sort of a priority.

== Second Circassian attack ==
The Circassians launched a full-scale attack on 7 August [O.S. 26 July] 1877, while the population of Kalofer and the nearby villages were already climbing the mountain across to Troyan. A number of people, primarily children and older or infirm men and women, who could not leave, were slaughtered. The total number of victims of both Cicrcassian attacks stands at 618 people, while some 1,000 got lost or were unable to complete the climb, suffered from exposure or the elements and never reached the other side.

The entire town was burned to the ground, along with 1308 houses, 250 stores, 200 ginning undertakings and watermills and 1400 stables. The only thing standing that the citizens of Kalofer found upon their return in 1878 were the 110 Romani houses at the end of the town, 3 Bulgarian houses, one watermill and one bakery. Kalofer would never recover its former economic standing, and many of its population would go look elsewhere for a better future.

== See also ==
- Ottoman Bulgaria
- Ottoman Empire
- List of massacres in Ottoman Bulgaria
- The Terror (Karlovo massacre)
- Batak massacre
- Boyadzhik massacre
