= The Terror (Karlovo massacre) =

Ottoman massacre of Bulgarian civilians

The Terror (Bulgarian: Страшното) is the name given to the five-month reign of terror that the Bulgarian population of the town of Karlovo suffered at the hands of the Ottoman authorities from 22 July 1877 to 28 December 1877, during the Russo-Turkish War (1877-1878).

The name refers both to the massacre of 288 Bulgarian civilians by regular Ottoman army and Circassian paramilitaries (bashi-bazouk) on 30 July–3 August [O.S. 18–22 July] 1877 and to the capture and imprisonment of more than 500 town notables in the subsequent months, many of whom were hanged or exiled to Asia Minor.

== Events ==
=== Conduct of the Russian army ===
On two occasions (23 July [O.S. 11 July] 1877] and 29 July [O.S. 16 July] 1877), Russian advance reconnaissance units "liberated" the town but then immediately withdrew. This led to the dispatch of regular Ottoman army of approx. 10,000 soldiers and 2,000 irregular bashi-bazouk from Plovdiv. Bulgarian historian Plamen Mitev has heavily criticised this demonstrative behaviour of the Russian army, which he holds partially accountable for the wave of Ottoman violence against the civilian Christian Bulgarian population in a number of Sub-Balkan Bulgarian towns and villages in the summer of 1877, including Karlovo, Sopot, Kalofer and Stara Zagora.

=== Massacre ===
On 30 July [O.S. 18 July] 1877, regular Ottoman army soldiers entered the town and started plundering the Bulgarian districts of it, but, seeing that there were no Russian forces, they eventually pulled out. On 3 August [O.S. 22 July] 1877, their place was taken by Circassian bashi-bazouk, which in addition to looting and plundering, also massacred a number of civilians. The number of confirmed casualties stands at 288 people.

=== Police and judicial terror ===
In the course of August 1877, the Ottoman authorities organised several round-ups of eminent Bulgarian citizens of Karlovo. A total of 108 people were detained on 2 August, followed by 104 people on 15 August, 156 people on 19 August and by 113 citizens of Karlovo and 37 citizens of nearby villages on 25 August. All of these were sent to prison in Plovdiv, where they were put on trial on fabricated charges for collusion with the Russian forces.

Ultimately, 110 were pronounced guilty and hanged, while 31 were sentenced to exile in Asia Minor (Adana, etc.), where 11 of them eventually died. The rest are presumed to have been set free. However, a number of other sources talk about "the 864 widows of Karlovo", among other things, in connection with their letter of protest to the Eastern Rumelia Organic Statute Preparation Committee, where they argue against the deployment of Ottoman garrisons across the autonomous Bulgarian Province of Eastern Rumelia. Ultimately, Ottoman garrisons were not established.

== See also ==
- Ottoman Bulgaria
- Ottoman Empire
- List of massacres in Ottoman Bulgaria
- Kalofer massacre
- Kavarna uprising
- Stara Zagora massacre
