= Circassians in Bulgaria =

Circassian: Балгарыем ис Адыгэхэр Bulgarian: Черкези в България
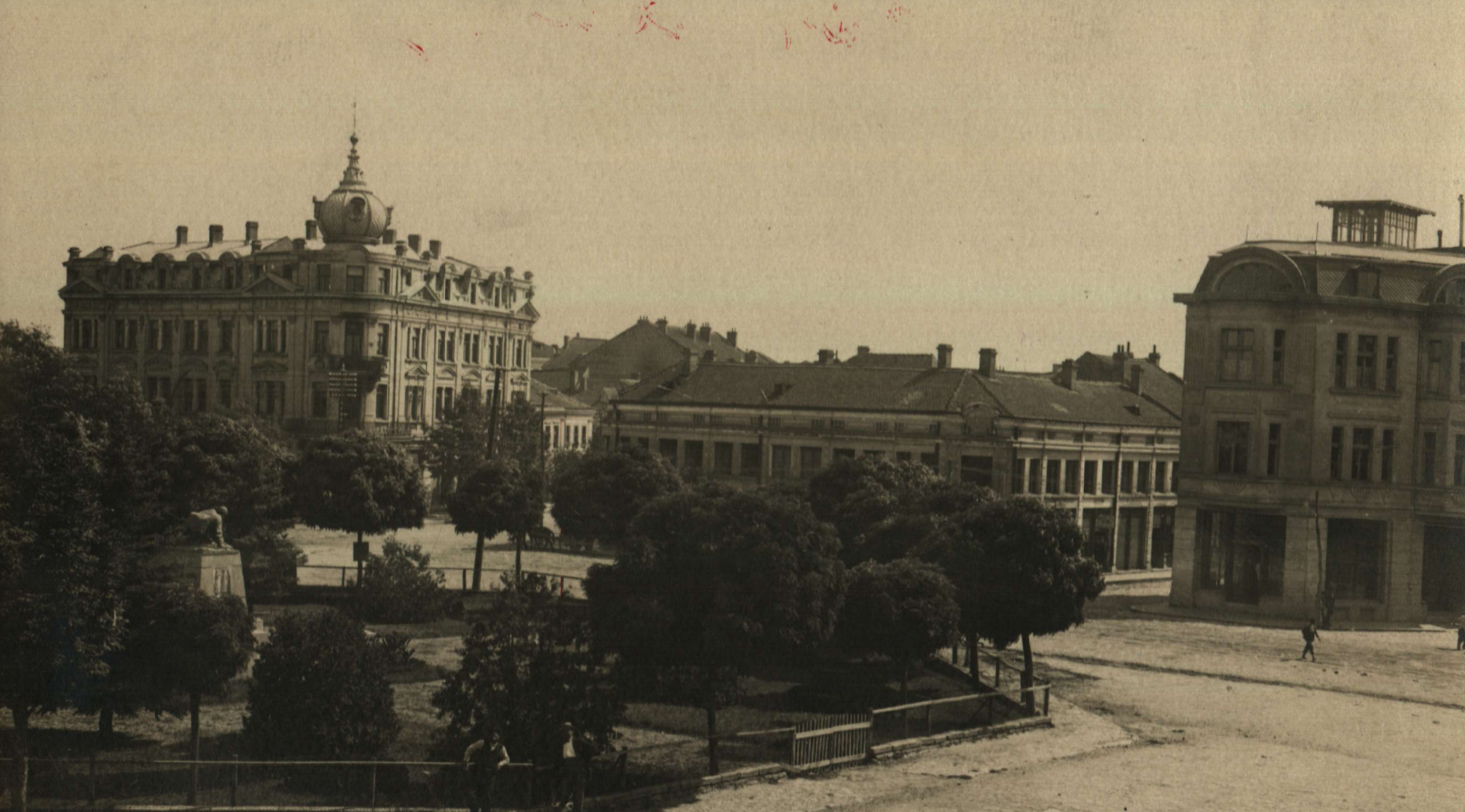
- Vidin, Bulgaria

Total population
- 150,000 (late 19th century); 573 (1992)

Regions with significant populations
- Varna; Vidin; Vratsa; Shumen; Dobrich; Veliko Tarnovo; Pleven; Yambol; Burgas; Stara Zagora; (Formerly)

Languages
- Circassian

Religion
- Mainly Islam

Related ethnic groups
- other Circassians

The Circassians in Bulgaria (Note: Adyghe: Балгарыем ис Адыгэхэр, romanized: Balgarıyem yis Adıgexer; Bulgarian: Черкези в България, romanized: Čerkezi v Bǎlgarija) were a large ethnic minority in the territory that constitutes modern Bulgaria. In the late 19th century, they numbered around 150,000. In 1992, 573 people in the country identified themselves as Circassian.

== History ==
=== Settlement ===
After the Circassian genocide following the Russo-Circassian War, large number of Circassians were exiled to the Ottoman Empire, including in Bulgaria, where there was an estimated number of 150,000 Circassians. In 1863, members of the Abzakh tribe started settling in Bulgaria. At first arrival, the Circassians mistook the Bulgarians for Russians due to the fact that both spoke a Slavic language and were Orthodox Christians. Those who believed that they have simply been exiled to another region of Russia believed that the war was still ongoing and were quick to attack Bulgarian villages until the confusion was cleared. In 1861–1862 alone, in the Danube Vilayet, there were 41,000 Circassian refugee families. Compact masses were settled in today's regions of Vidin, Vratsa, Montana, Shumen, Dobrich and Veliko Tarnovo, where the Circassians created their own villages, and another part of them settled in Bulgarian or Turkish villages. In the region of Vratsa, Montana and Pleven, Circassians are also settled in Tatar villages. In Southern Bulgaria, the most numerous Circassian community was created in Yambol, Burgas and partly in today's Stara Zagora region.

==== Diseases and starvation ====
Their lives were not easy, as the inability of the Circassians to adapt to the new climate in the areas where they are inhabited led to serious diseases. Many families completely disappeared within a few years. Around 80,000 Circassians lived in settlements that came to be referred as "death camps" on the outskirts of Varna, where they were deprived of food and subjected to diseases. Reportedly, when Circassians asked for bread, Turkish soldiers would chase them down because the Turks were afraid of the diseases the Circassians might have contracted. Most Circassians died, and the Ottomans were unable to bury the vast number of bodies, so they enlisted the help of convicts. "We would rather move to Siberia than live in this Siberia... one can die, not live, on the indicated place," one Circassian in the region wrote to the zone's Governor-General. Some starving Circassians resorted to banditry.

Both the Muslim and Christian population of Vidin volunteered to help the starving Circassian settlers by increasing grain production for them. The Ottoman authorities attempted to turn the Circassians into productive farmers by providing them with land to cultivate, with the expectation that the native inhabitants of the areas would look after them and "welcome them as brothers." This would create problems in Bulgaria, where some people were asked to assist in the construction of houses for the starving Circassians. Some Bulgarians have also been reported to have been driven out of their homes in favor of Circassians, though these claims are contradictory and dubious at best.

==== Cooperation with the Ottoman authorities ====
Circassian gangs and Turkish gangs were quick to form alliances, due to their common Islamic faith and shared grudge for Orthodox Slavs. The Circassians were active participants in the conflicts in the region, always siding with the Ottomans against the Christian population in the Balkans. In 1876 Circassians aided with the Turks in crushing the April uprising, causing sympathy for Bulgarians in Europe. During the 1877-78 Russo-Turkish War, the Circassians were used by the Turkish army as irregular cavalry units. In the summer of 1877, mainly Circassian irregular cavalry from the villages of Hasanoglu and Otmanlii participated on the Turkish side in the battle for Nova Zagora. The Circassians took an active part in the battles for Shipka, Lovech and Pleven.

=== Exile ===
The Circassians in Bulgaria fiercely opposed the Bulgarian Revolt in 1876. Kosovo Circassians also joined the Bulgarian Circassians. European countries in turn demanded that the Circassians leave the region. The Circassians were seen as a "Muslim threat" and expelled from Bulgaria and other parts of the Balkans by Russian armies following the end of the Russo-Turkish war. They were not allowed to return, so the Ottoman authorities settled them in new other lands such as in modern Jordan (see Circassians in Jordan), where they would have conflict with Bedouin Arabs, and Turkey (see Circassians in Turkey), where they would initially not be welcomed, and would ally with the Chechens (see Chechens in Turkey) against the Kurds and Armenians.
