= Batak massacre =

1876 Ottoman massacre of Bulgarian civilians

Coordinates: 41°56′33″N 24°13′8″E

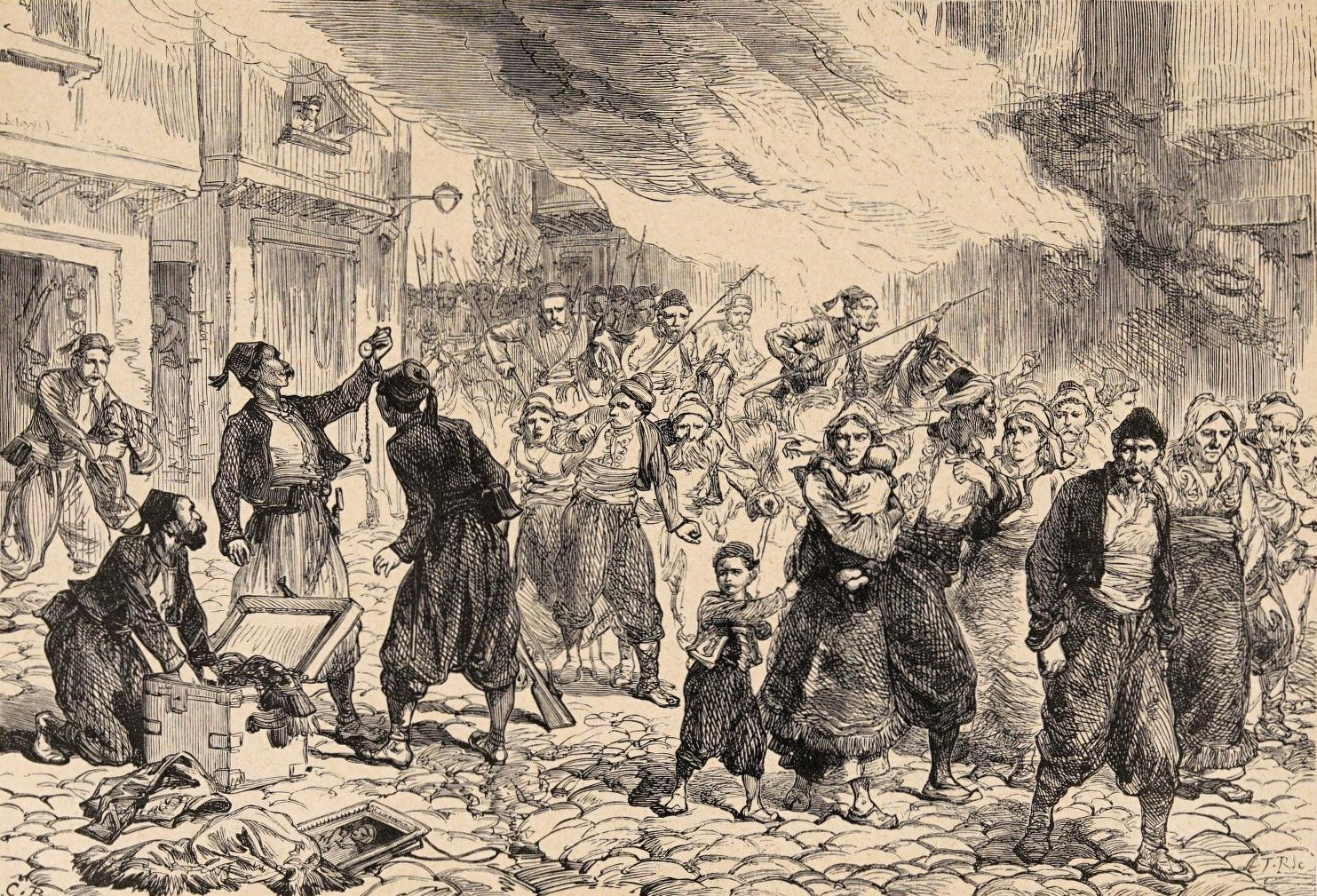
- Burning and sack of Batak, 1876, by Charles Ricketts.
- Location: Batak, Ottoman Empire
- Date: 2 May 1876–15 May 1876
- Target: Ethnic Bulgarians
- Attack type: Massacre
- Deaths: 1,200–8,000 Bulgarian Civilians killed
- Perpetrator: Ottoman Bashi-Bazouks
- Motive: Anti-Bulgarian Sentiment

The Batak massacre was a massacre of Bulgarians in the town of Batak by Ottoman irregular cavalry troops in 1876, at the beginning of the Bulgarian April Uprising of 1876. The estimate for the number of casualties ranges from 1,200 to 8,000, depending on source, with the most common estimate being 5,000 casualties.

The indiscriminate slaughter of non-combatant civilians at Batak shocked the general public in Western Europe and came to be known in the press as the Bulgarian Horrors and the Crime of the Century.

The scale of the atrocities caused British commissioner Walter Baring, who had been dispatched by the British embassy in Constantinople to verify the events, to describe the tragedy "as perhaps the most heinous crime that has stained the history of the present century".

The events at Batak caused a public outcry across Europe, mobilized ordinary people and famous intellectuals to demand a reform of the Ottoman model of governance of the Bulgarian lands, and eventually led to the re-establishment of a separate Bulgarian state in 1878.

The anti-Turkish and pro-Bulgarian public mood made it difficult for Benjamin Disraeli to implement his policy, prevented Britain from intervening on behalf of the Ottoman Empire and created the international conditions for the Russian invasion of 1877.

== Uprising in Batak ==
Batak's role in the April Uprising was to take possession of Ottoman storehouses in surrounding villages and ensure that the insurgents would have provisions. Batak was also supposed to block main thoroughfares and prevent Ottoman soldiers from receiving supplies.

If rebel chetas in nearby locations failed to accomplish their tasks, the survivors were supposed to gather in Batak. The only problem expected by the organisers was that Batak would have to defend itself alone against the Ottoman troops. After the April uprising was proclaimed on 2 May [O.S. 20 April] 1876, part of the armed men in Batak, led by voivode Petar Goranov, attacked the Ottomans. They succeeded in eliminating part of the Ottoman leaders, but were reported to the authorities, which sent a paramilitary detachment of some 5,000 irregular soldiers (bashi-bazouk), led by Ahmet Aga from Barutin which surrounded the town.

After the first battle, the insurgents from Batak decided to negotiate with Ahmet Agha. He pledged to withdraw his troops on condition that Batak disarmed. However, after the rebels laid down their weapons, the paramilitaries attacked and beheaded them.

== Massacre ==
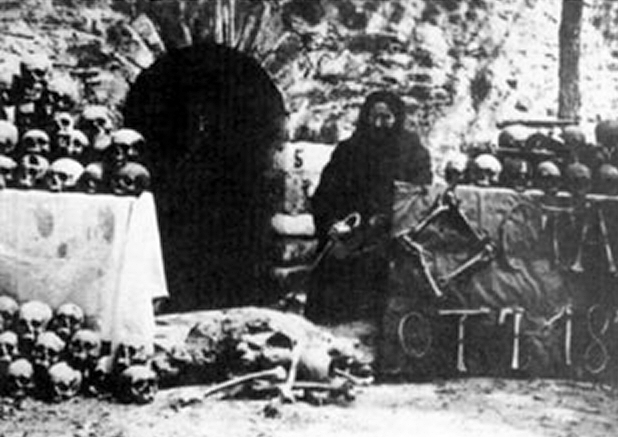
Postcard depicting human remains from the Batak massacre. Author and date of the postcard is unknown.

While the leaders of the Revolutionary committee were surrendering the weapons, some of Batak's residents managed to escape the village. After that, the entire village was surrounded, and no one else was let out. The bashi-bozouk went around the houses, raiding and burning them. Many people decided to hide in the houses of the wealthy or in the church, which had a stronger structure and would protect them from fire.

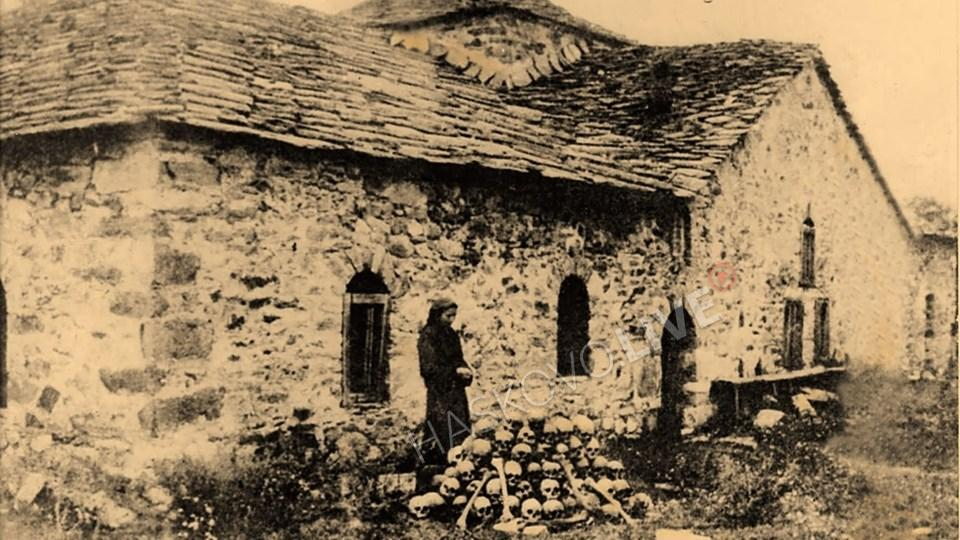
Batak's St. Nedelya Church in the 1880s

On 14 May [O.S. 2 May] 1876, those hidden in the House of Bogdan surrendered, as Ahmet Agha had pledged to spare them. The pledge was not kept: in the end, more than 200 men, women and children were led out, stripped out of their valuables and clothes, and brutally killed. The Agha asked some of the wealthy men of Batak to go to his camp and lay down all the arms of the villagers. Amongst them was the mayor, Trendafil Toshev Kerelov, and his son, Petar Trendafilov Kerelov. They had supposedly reached an agreement that if the village disarmed, the paramilitaries would withdraw from Batak. However, once the rebels' arms had been confiscated, all of them were beheaded, burnt alive or impaled.

The murder of the leader Trendafil Kerelov was particularly violent, as described by the witness—his son's wife Bosilka:

My father-in-law went to meet the Bashi-Bаzouk when the village was surrounded and saw Ahmet Agha who said he required the weapons to be collected from the villagers. Trendafil went and had them collected. After they were handed in, he was shot at with a pistol, the ball from which grazed his eye. I then heard Ahmet Agha give the order with his own lips to impale and roast Trendafil. The words he used were "Shishak aor", meaning in Turkish, to put on the spit—such as the slices called kabobs (i.e., as a shish kebab). They then took from him all the money he had, stripped off his clothes, put out his eyes and his teeth, and impaled him slowly until the stake came out of his mouth; after which they roasted him on the fire, he being then alive. He lived for half an hour during the awful event... A number of Bulgarian women were present besides myself. We were encircled by Bashi-Bazouks who hemmed us in on all sides so that we were made to see what was done to Trendafil. They thought he had more money concealed and was unwilling to give it up and therefore they tortured and killed him.

One of Bosilka's children, Vladimir, who was still a baby at his mother's breast, was impaled on a sword in front of her eyes:

At the time this was happening, Ahmet Agha's son took my child from my back and cut him to pieces, there in front of me. The burnt bones of Trendafil stood there for one month and only then they were buried.

Januarius MacGahan, a journalist of the New York Herald and the British Daily News wrote of the terrible happenings after his visit to Batak in the company of Eugene Schuyler. They described the burned and destroyed city with the stench of the rot of thousands of piled dismembered corpses and skeletons of innocent victims, including young women, children and unborn babies torn out from the wombs of their pregnant mothers.

== The church ==
After the Ottoman paramilitaries destroyed Batak's school, burning 200 people hidden in the basement alive, they headed to the Bulgarian Orthodox church "Sveta Nedelya", which ended up being the last keep of the residents of the village.

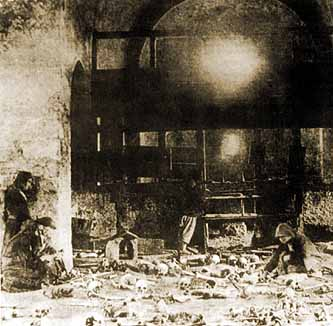
The interior of the church in Batak two years after the bloody suppression of the April Uprising and the massacre of the inhabitants of the village. Author and exact date not known.

On the morning of 15 May [O.S. 3 May] 1876, the bashi-bazouk took over the yard of the church and advanced to the door, but were unable to get in—–the door was barred by the people inside.

The defence of the church held for three days, with the paramilitaries shooting ceaselessly at the villagers to make them surrender. Some tried to enter the church from the roof but were unsuccessful, even though they were able to shoot some of the people inside. There was no water in the church, so the people trapped inside tried to dig into the floor with bare hands in order to find underground water.

Unable to go on without water, the survivors came outside on the third day. When they opened the doors of the church, ruthless slaughter ensued, where only those who accepted to be converted to Islam were spared. The plans of the Ottoman leader were to populate the village with the converted villagers, but it turned out that there were not enough of them. Before the bashi-bozouk left the village, they tried to burn the church, yet the stone walls remained, and only the wooden furniture and the icons were destroyed. When a Russian commission went to inspect the village 3 months later, the Ottoman authorities tried to bury the bodies, but they could not hide the smell in the air. They also painted the walls of the church, but the blood stains showed up in time.

After the massacre at the church, Ahmet Agha summoned all the surviving villagers outside, saying that it would be in order to make a list of the slain and the widows. The better part of the survivors gathered, since those who did not obey would be killed. They were divided in two groups of women and men; then the Ottoman commander made the women stand back and slew all the remaining 300 men. Those women who protested were also raped and killed. On the same day, another 300 people murdered on the wooden bridge beside the school; first their arms were cut off, then their ears, noses, shoulders, and only after that they were finished.

== Witness accounts ==
According to the first eyewitness on the site, American diplomat Eugene Schuyler, the number of victims at Batak stood at around 5,000, out of a population of 8,000 people in 900 households. Batak was only one out of 11 villages and 3 towns that Schuyler visited in person for the preparation of his report on the uprising, subsequently published in the Daily News. The report further estimated the total number of Bulgarian casualties, rebels and non-combatants alike, at a minimum of 15,000, versus only 155 Muslim casualties, of whom 12 women and children. Most of all, Schuyler emphasized the extreme level of brutality demonstrated, above all, in Batak, which—given the failure of the rebellion and the quick surrender of the villager—had been completely unnecessary. Schuyler writes, as follows:

On every side were human bones, skulls, ribs, and even complete skeletons, heads of girls still adorned with braids of long hair, bones of children, skeletons still encased in clothing. Here was a house the floor of which was white with the ashes and charred bones of thirty persons burned alive there.

Here was the spot where the village notable Trendafil was spitted on a pike and then roasted, and where he is now buried; there was a foul hole full of decomposing bodies; here a mill dam filled with swollen corpses; here the school house, where 200 women and children had taken refuge there were burned alive, and here the church and churchyard, where fully a thousand half-decayed forms were still to be seen, filling the enclosure in a heap several feet high, arms, feet, and heads protruding from the stones which had vainly been thrown there to hide them, and poisoning all the air.

Since my visit, by orders of the Mutessarif, the Kaimakam of Tatar Bazardjik was sent to Batak, with some lime to aid in the decomposition of the bodies, and to prevent a pestilence.

Ahmed Agha, who commanded at the massacre, has been decorated and promoted to the rank of Yuz-bashi...

Another witness to the aftermath of the Massacre was American journalist Januarius MacGahan, who described the following scene:

There was not a roof left, not a whole wall standing; all was a mass of ruins... We looked again at the heap of skulls and skeletons before us, and we observed that they were all small and that the articles of clothing intermingled with them and lying about were all women's apparel. These, then, were all women and girls. From my saddle I counted about a hundred skulls, not including those that were hidden beneath the others in the ghastly heap nor those that were scattered far and wide through the fields. The skulls were nearly all separated from the rest of the bones – the skeletons were nearly all headless.

These women had all been beheaded...and the procedure seems to have been, as follows: They would seize a woman, strip her carefully to her chemise, laying aside articles of clothing that were valuable, with any ornaments and jewels she might have about her. Then as many of them as cared would violate her, and the last man would kill her or not as the humour took him....

We looked into the church which had been blackened by the burning of the woodwork, but not destroyed, nor even much injured. It was a low building with a low roof, supported by heavy irregular arches, that as we looked in seemed scarcely high enough for a tall man to stand under. What we saw there was too frightful for more than a hasty glance.

An immense number of bodies had been partially burnt there and the charred and blackened remains seemed to fill it half way up to the low dark arches and make them lower and darker still, were lying in a state of putrefaction too frightful to look upon. I had never imagined anything so horrible. We all turned away sick and faint, and staggered out of the fearful pest house glad to get into the street again.

We walked about the place and saw the same thing repeated over and over a hundred times. Skeletons of men with the clothing and flesh still hanging to and rotting together; skulls of women, with the hair dragging in the dust. bones of children and infants everywhere. Here they show us a house where twenty people were burned alive; there another where a dozen girls had taken refuge, and been slaughtered to the last one, as their bones amply testified. Everywhere horrors upon horrors...

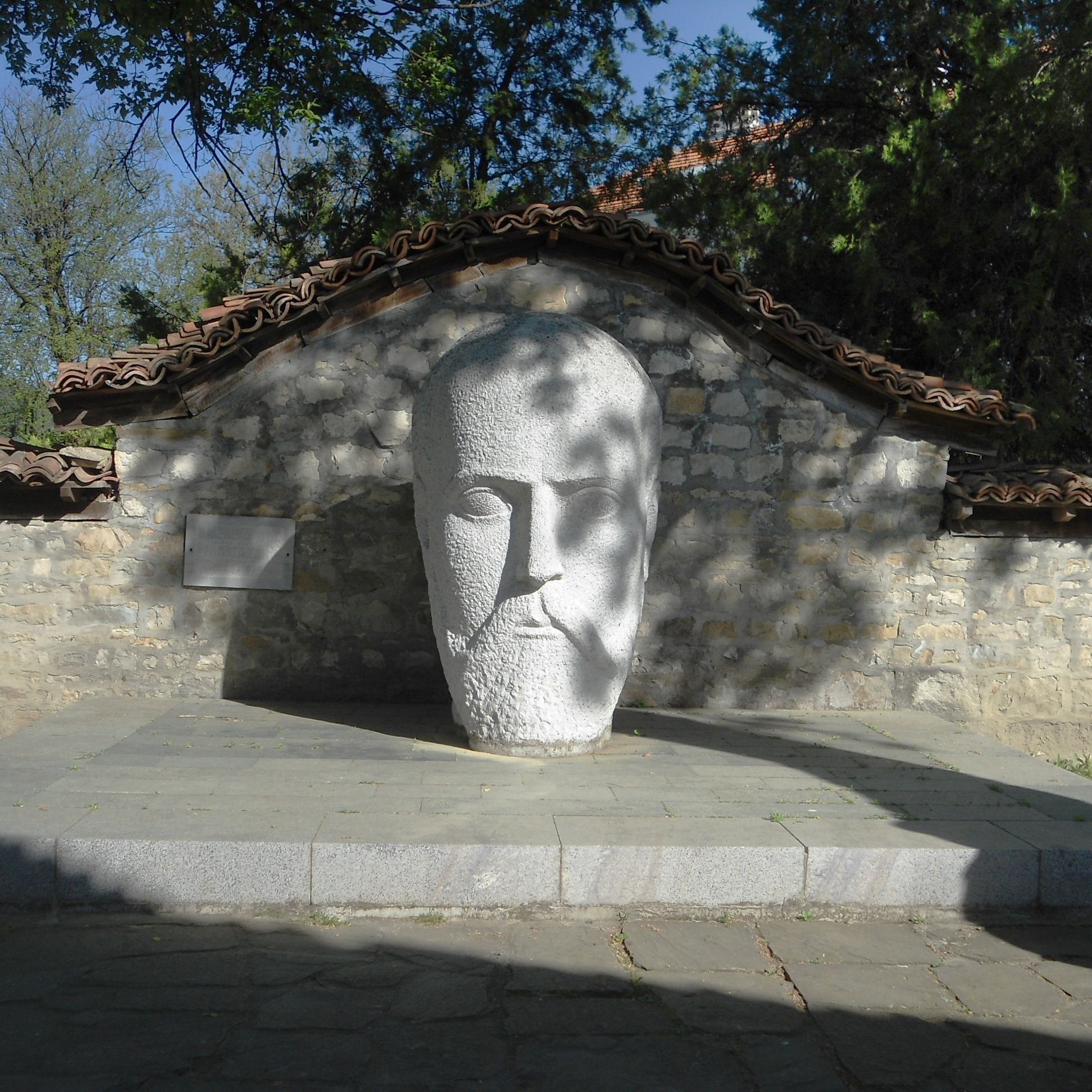
A monument of Januarius MacGahan in Elena, Bulgaria

The third visitor on the site, this time in an official investigatory capacity, was British commissioner Mr. Walter Baring. Baring was actually the reason why Schuyler made the trip in the first place: he was a known Turcophile, and given the British Empire's strongly pro-Ottoman position, there was fear at the American community in Constantinople that his enquiry would turn into a cover-up. However, Baring, by and large, confirmed Schuyler's findings, only lowering the estimated number of Bulgarian victims to approx. 12,000. As for Batak itself, Baring reconfirmed the figure of 5,000 casualties and bluntly described the massacre "as perhaps the most heinous crime that has stained the history of the present century".

According to British politician and writer Robert More, who visited the town in 1876, Batak had 680 houses (households) and a population of approx. 9,000 just prior to the uprising. Pastor J.F. Clarke, who was in charge of distributing American relief, stated in October 1876 that the surviving population of Batak at the time was around 1,700 people.

Contemporary historians R.J. Crampton and Kurt Jonassohn have largely confirmed Schuyler and MacGahan's findings and figures.

== Accusations of revisionism ==
In May 2007, a public conference was scheduled in Bulgaria, aiming to present research, held by Martina Baleva and Ulf Brunnbauer, on the formation of national memory for the Batak massacre. Bulgarian media reported that the authors were denying the massacre, which raised substantial media controversy. Finally, the conference was cancelled, and several eminent Bulgarian historians (including Georgi Markov, head of the Institute of History of the Bulgarian Academy of Sciences and Bozhidar Dimitrov, director of the National Museum of History in Sofia) qualified Baleva and Brunnbauer's research as "grandiose falsification". Other historians claimed that the principle of academic freedom is violated.

=== Before the media controversy beginning ===
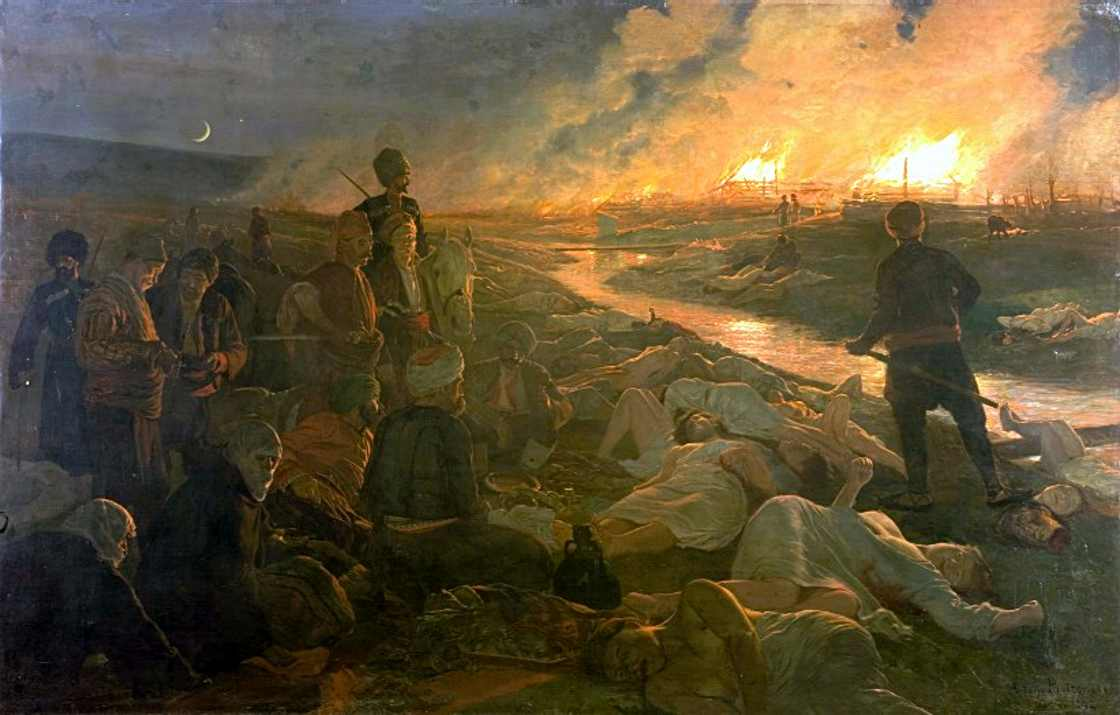
Antoni Piotrowski 1889 The Batak Massacre

The conference was scheduled to be held in Batak on 18 May 2007 as part of a project entitled "Feindbild Islam – Geschichte und Gegenwart antiislamischer Stereotype in Bulgarien am Beispiel des Mythos vom Massaker in Batak" ("The Image of the Islamic Enemy - the Past and Present of Anti-Islamic stereotypes in Bulgaria as exemplified by the Myth of the Batak Massacre"). The project was led by Ulf Brunnbauer and Martina Baleva from the Institute of Eastern European Studies at the University of Berlin, who were also expected to read papers at the conference.

=== Reaction in media ===
Bulgarian media reported that the scientists were denying that a massacre had occurred. There was a public outcry, widespread protests and immediate reactions on the part of the Mayor of Batak, Prime Minister Sergei Stanishev, and President Georgi Parvanov. The Bulgarian Academy of Sciences rejected the possibility of providing a place for the conference, stating that there is a huge amount of material proof and documents for the massacres at Batak and Perushtitsa. Ulf Brunnbauer and Martina Baleva apologized and asserted that the outcry was based on a misunderstanding and incorrect information. They stated that their intention had been not to deny the massacre, but to critically look at some paintings and photographs related to it - an issue that Baleva had published an article on a year earlier. They also explained that the term "myth" in a culturological context does not qualify the veracity of an event, but rather refers to the way it is represented and used as a social construct. Some Bulgarian intellectuals criticized what they said was censorship and an encroachment upon the independence of scholarship and a petition was started in protest against the campaign.

=== Kaychev-Baleva debate ===
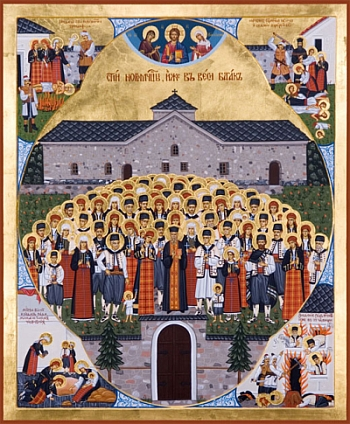
Icon of the Saints from Batak

An important point in Baleva's paper that had been supposed to be read at the conference was that Polish artist Antoni Piotrowski's painting titled "The Batak Massacre" was an important factor for the formation of a national memory of the massacre. Naum Kaychev, assistant professor at Sofia University's Faculty of History, criticized this view in an article seeking to point out certain contradictions and factual errors in Baleva's paper that had been supposed to be read at the cancelled conference.

One point of Kaychev's article was to show that national memory of the massacre existed long before Piotrowski's painting - for example, the massacre is described in a school history book in 1881, while Piotrowski's painting only appeared in 1892. In response, Baleva conceded that she had been wrong in claiming that Batak had been entirely forgotten before the painting was created. She nevertheless argued, among other things, that Piotrowski's work did have a significant influence on subsequent national memory of the massacre and on the form of the Batak memorial in particular.

== Canonization ==
On 3 April 2011, the victims of the Batak massacre were canonized as saints, an act that the Church had not done for more than a century.

== See also ==
- Chios massacre
- Ottoman Bulgaria
- Ottoman Empire
- List of massacres in Ottoman Bulgaria
- Stara Zagora massacre

== Primary sources ==
- Millman, Richard. "The Bulgarian massacres reconsidered." Slavonic and East European Review 58.2 (1980): 218–231. online
- MacGahan, Januarius A. (1876). Turkish Atrocities in Bulgaria, Letters of the Special Commissioner of the "Daily News", J.A. MacGahan, Esq. London: Bradbury Agnew and Co. pp. 9–88.
- More, Robert (1877). Under the Balkans: Notes of a Visit to the District of Philippopolis in 1876. ISBN 1376517965.
- Schuyler, Eugene, Mr. Schuyler's Preliminary Report on the Moslem Atrocities (1876) online
- Stoyanoff, Zahary (1913). Pages from the Autobiography of a Bulgarian Insurgent. Translated by Potter, M.W. London: Edward Arnold – via Internet Archive.
- Stoyanov, Zahary (1884). Записки по българските въстания [Pages from the Autobiography of a Bulgarian Insurgent] (in Bulgarian).
- Muchinov, Ventsislav (2019). "Демографско развитие на Карлово, Сопот, Калофер и Аджар през Възраждането" [Demographic Development of Karlovo, Sopot, Kalofer and Adzhar during the Bulgarian Revival] (PDF). Анамнеза (in Bulgarian). 1: 13–41. ISSN 1312-9295.
