= Anka (name) =

Anka is a given name and a surname.

As a given name, it is a diminutive form (and hypocorism) of the female given name Ana.

Notable people with the name include:

== Given name ==
- Anka Lambreva (1895–1976), Bulgarian nurse, teacher and adventurer
- Anka Bakova (born 1957), Bulgarian former rower
- Anka Broniewska (1929–1954), Polish filmmaker
- Anka Čekanová (1905–1965), Czech dancer
- Anka Đurović (1850–1925), Serbian nurse
- Anka Georgieva (born 1959), Bulgarian former rower
- Anka Grupińska (born 1956), Polish dissident, journalist and writer
- Anka Khristolova (born 1955), Bulgarian former volleyball player
- Anka Krizmanić (1896–1987), Croatian painter and printmaker
- Anka Muhlstein (born 1935), French historian and biographer
- Anka Obrenović (1821–1868), Serbian princess and writer
- Anka Wolbert (born 1963), Dutch musician, singer and songwriter

== Surname ==
- Kris Anka, American comic book artist
- Paul Anka (born 1941), musician popular mainly in the 1950s and '60s in the United States
- Yushau Anka (born 1950), Nigerian politician

== Fictional characters ==
- Arne Anka, a poet/party duck by the cartoonist Charlie Christensen
- Anka The Machine-Gunner, a female movie character popular in Russian humor
- Ankha, a villager in the Animal Crossing series of video games
