= Kursum Mosque =

Kursum Mosque (from Turkish kurşun, "leaden") can refer to:

- Kursum Mosque, Karlovo, Bulgaria
- Kursum Mosque, Trikala, Greece
- Kursum Mosque, Kastoria, Greece
