= Anti-Zionist purge in the Polish Army =

Removal of Jewish soldiers in 1968

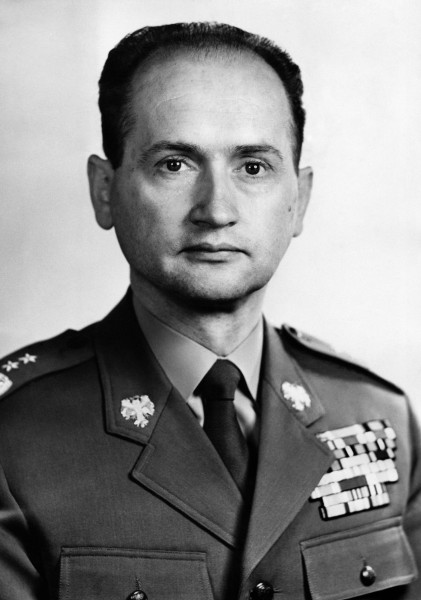
General Wojciech Jaruzelski, who was largely responsible for the purge in the Polish People's Army

The anti-Zionist purge in the Polish Army was the removal of soldiers of whom supported Zionism from the Polish People's Army, carried out in 1968 following the Six-Day War between Israel and Arab countries.

== Background ==
The Polish People's Army was a successor of the Polish armies formed in the Soviet Union during WW2. Due to the mass execution of Polish officers in the Katyn Massacre, most of the officers were people who were educated in the Soviet Union, with a proportion having Jewish roots. Jewish officers were also promoted due to their perceived loyalty towards the Soviet Union. The Communists seemed to guarantee safety against Polish antisemitism. As Lucjan Blitt, a Jewish socialist, wrote: "One thing that every group of Jews who had decided to rebuild their lives in Poland [after World War II] was certain about was the conviction that as long as a communist regime was in power, official anti-Semitism would be out of the question."

In the 1950s Polish communist leadership that led the Sovietization drive, "prominent Jewish Communists were unsurprisingly overrepresented", as the majority of Polish Holocaust survivors were those Polish Jews who had spent the war in the USSR.

Following the establishment of Israel in 1948, Stalin, disappointed by the pro-American stance of Israel, oriented the Soviet police against people with Zionist tendencies. However, this policy did not propagate to the Polish People's Army, where many officers sympathized with Israel. After the Six-Day War, the Soviet Union considered military action against Israel and pressed on Eastern Bloc countries to break diplomatic ties with Israel.

== March crisis ==
Following a meeting of Eastern European countries in Moscow, Polish leadership realized that Poland and Israel were firmly in two opposite blocs, and in the case of armed conflict, there would be a loyalty conflict for officers with Jewish roots. As a result, in 1967–1968, anti-Zionist purges were performed, and culminated in the so-called March events.

General Wojciech Jaruzelski, a member of the top management of the Ministry of Defense, and, from April 11, 1968, Minister of Defense, who headed a special committee, was to be responsible for the purge in the army. General Teodor Kufel, the head of the Military Internal Service was also co-responsible.

There is no consensus on the number of officers removed as part of the purge. Peter Raina indicated the number of several dozen, Anka Grupińska – 150.

The people affected by the purge were deprived of the officer rank "because of the lack of moral values" and demoted (e.g. Mieczysław Krzemiński).

== Antisemitic character of purges ==
In Polish historiography, the events of spring 1968 are often simply referred to as "March". The campaign that began in March "included state-sponsored propaganda framed as 'anti-Zionist' and was accompanied by public mobilization against perceived 'enemies of socialist Poland'". The actions led to the large-scale expulsion of Jews from the Polish United Workers' Party, government positions, and other roles. It resulted in thousands of Polish Jews emigrating to Israel.

== See also ==
- History of the Jews in Poland
- Israel–Poland relations
