= Bansko Peak =

Mountain on Livingston Island

Location of Tangra Mountains on Livingston Island in the South Shetland Islands.

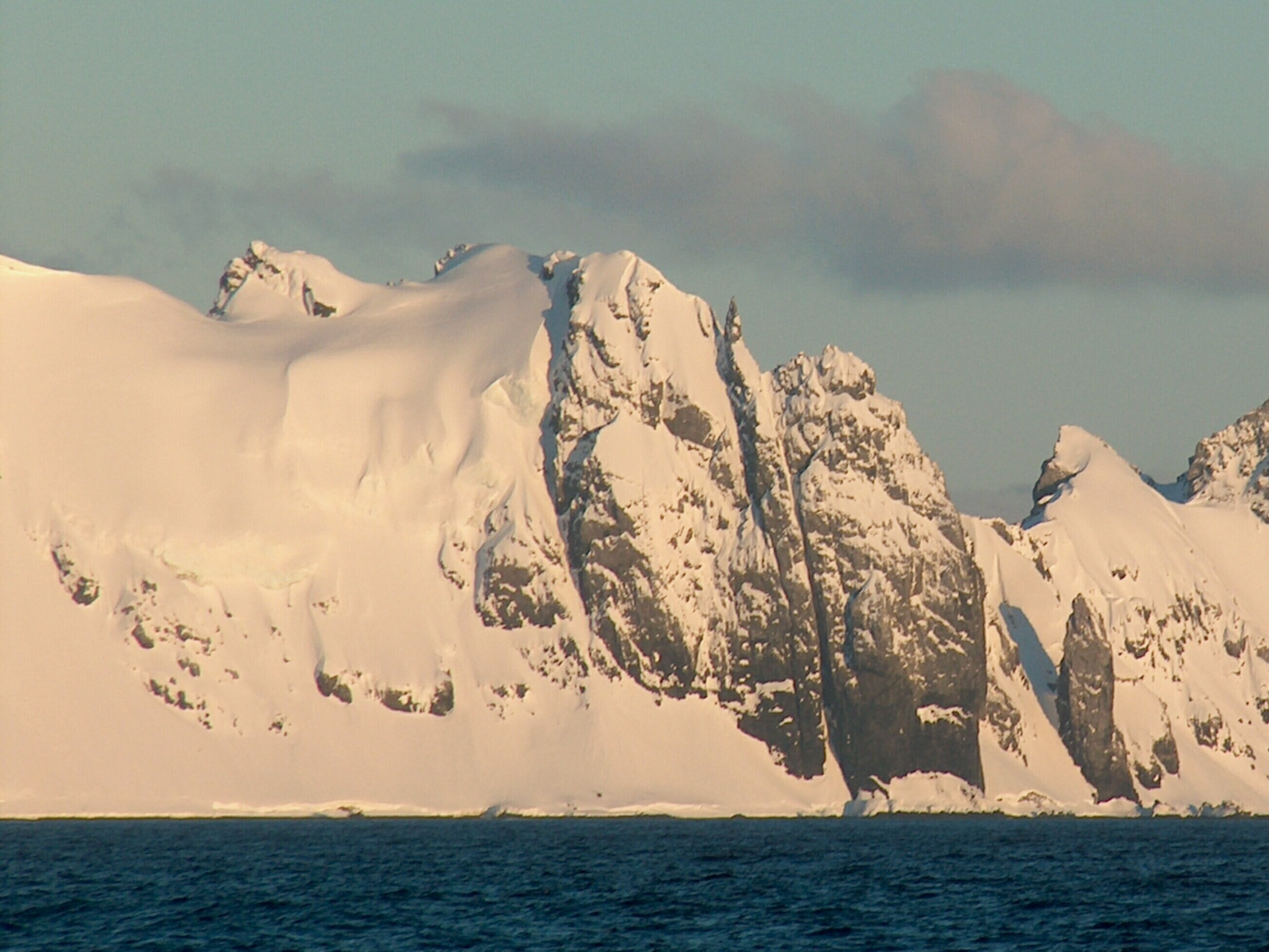
Bansko Peak

Topographic map of Livingston Island, Greenwich, Robert, Snow and Smith Islands.

Bansko Peak (Bulgarian: Връх Банско, \'vrɣx 'banskɔ\) is a 280-metre (920 ft) rocky peak in the eastern extremity of the Delchev Ridge in the Tangra Mountains of Livingston Island. The peak was named after the town of Bansko in southwestern Bulgaria.

== Location ==
The peak is located at 62°36′49.3″S 59°48′48.5″W, which is 690 m northeast of Karlovo Peak, 500 m east-northeast of Malyovitsa Crag, and 420 m southwest of Lyulin Peak.

== See also ==
- List of Bulgarian toponyms in Antarctica
- Antarctic Place-names Commission

== Maps ==
- L.L. Ivanov et al. Antarctica: Livingston Island and Greenwich Island, South Shetland Islands. Scale 1:100000 topographic map. Sofia: Antarctic Place-names Commission of Bulgaria, 2005.
- L.L. Ivanov. Antarctica: Livingston Island and Greenwich, Robert, Snow and Smith Islands. Scale 1:120000 topographic map. Troyan: Manfred Wörner Foundation, 2009. (Second edition 2010.)
