= Vasil Levski Monument (Karlovo) =

Historical monument in Bulgaria

Coordinates: 42.6374°N 24.8061°E

The Vasil Levski Monument stands in Vasil Levski Square in Karlovo, Bulgaria, between the churches of St. Nicholas and the Holy Mother. The foundation stone of the monument was laid on 15 May 1903, in front of prince regnant Ferdinand I. It was designed by the sculptor Marin Vasilev. The statue of Vasil Levski presents him with a revolver in his hand. By his side is a roaring lion, symbolising the nation of Bulgaria. In the lower part of the monument there is a list of Karlovo citizens, who died during the fight for Liberation of Bulgaria in July and August 1877. On the lower part of the pedestal there are three reliefs - "Creation of the revolutionary committee" („Създаване на революционен комитет“), "The arrest of Levski" („Залавянето на Левски“), and "Taking Karlovo's rebels from the konak" („Извеждане на карловски въстаници от конака“).

== Gallery ==
Images of the monument

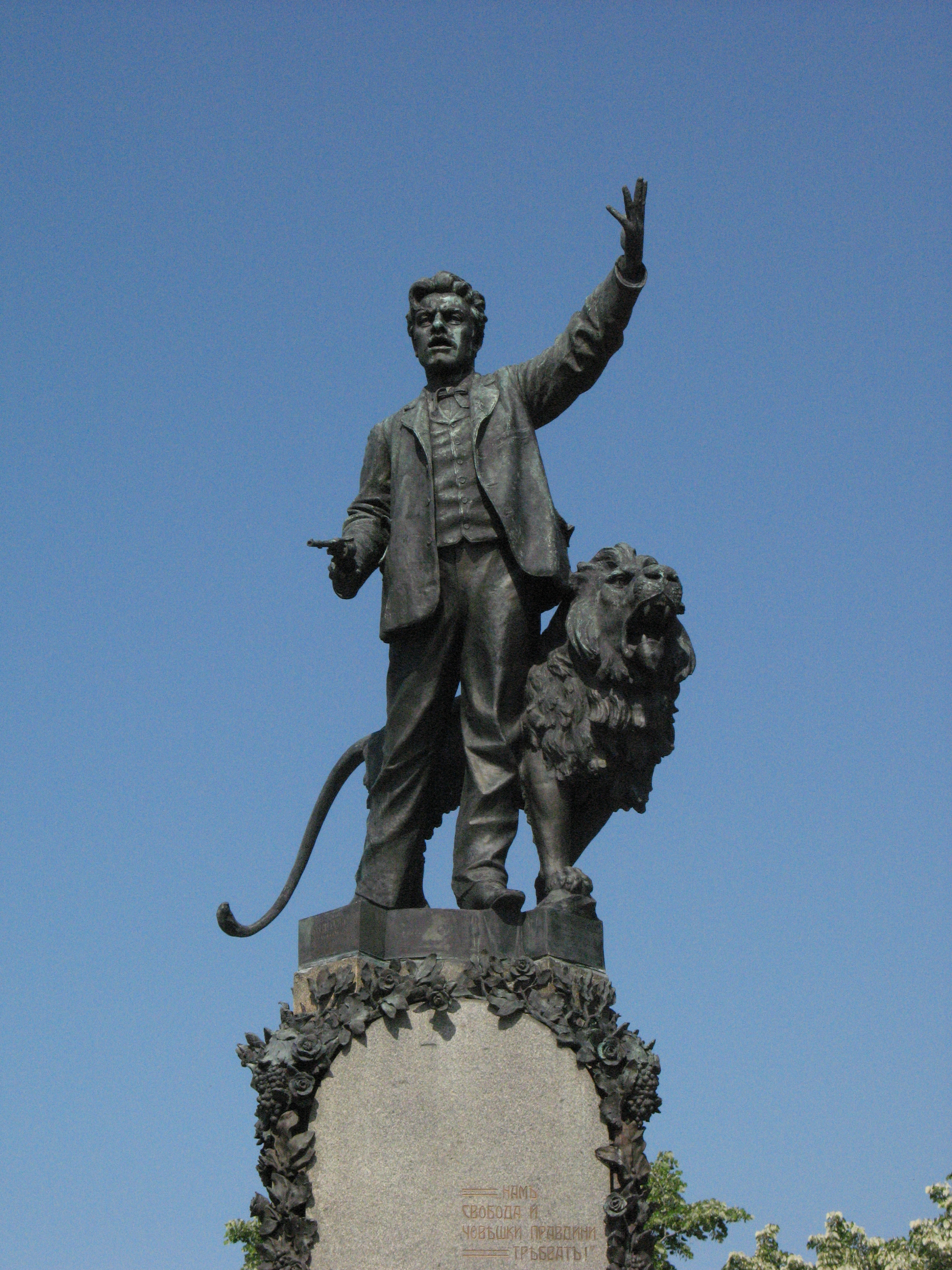

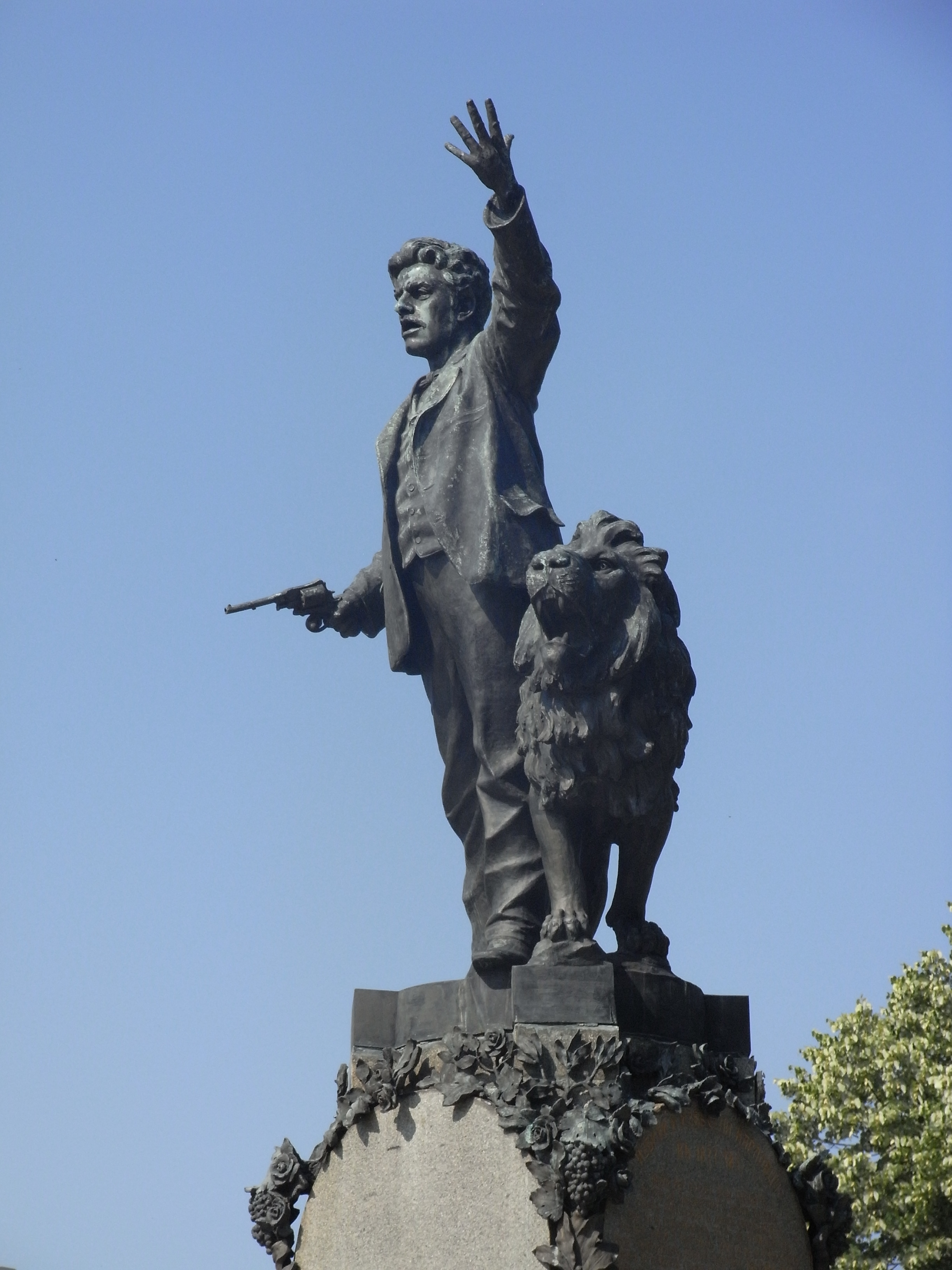

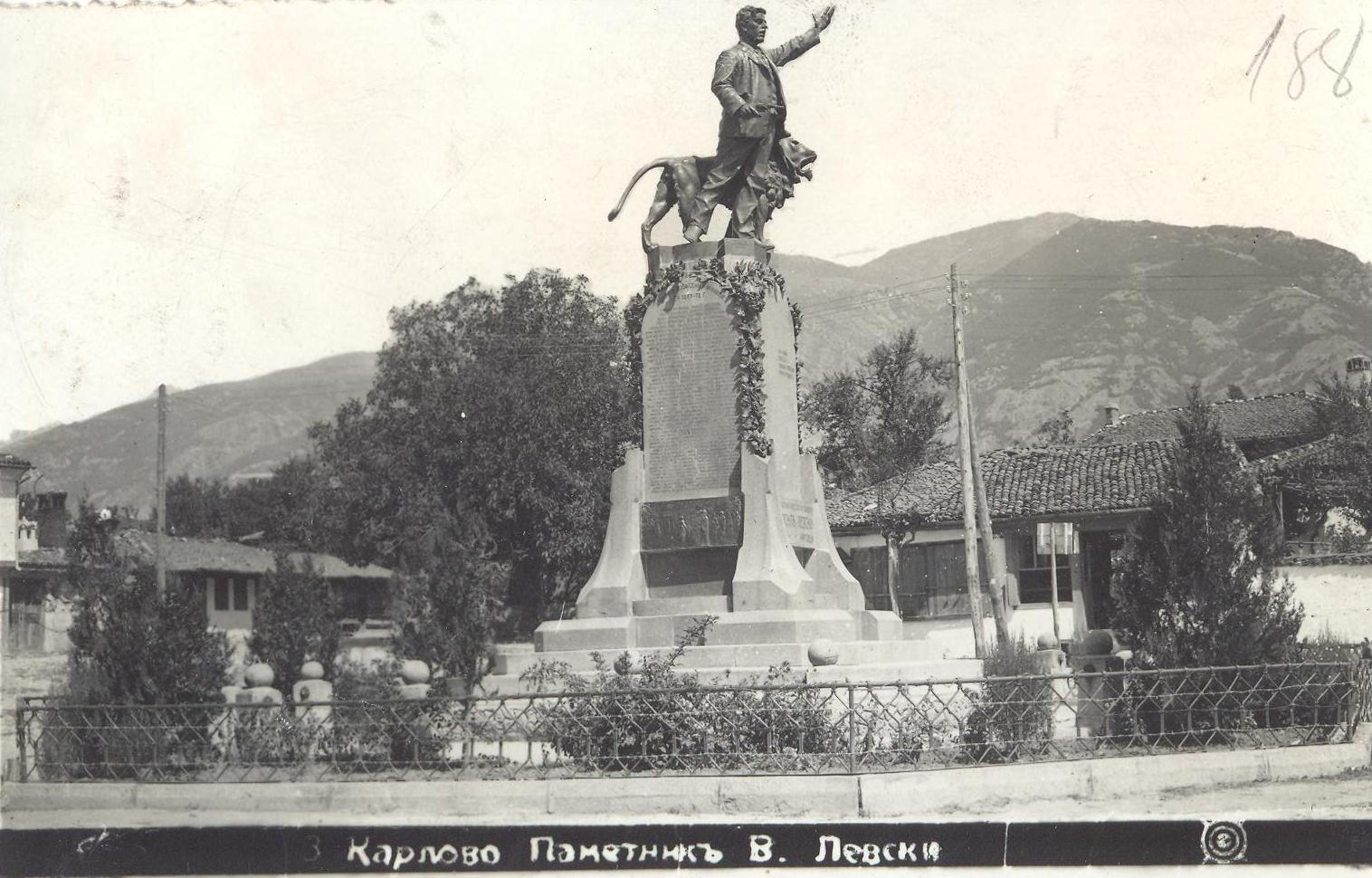

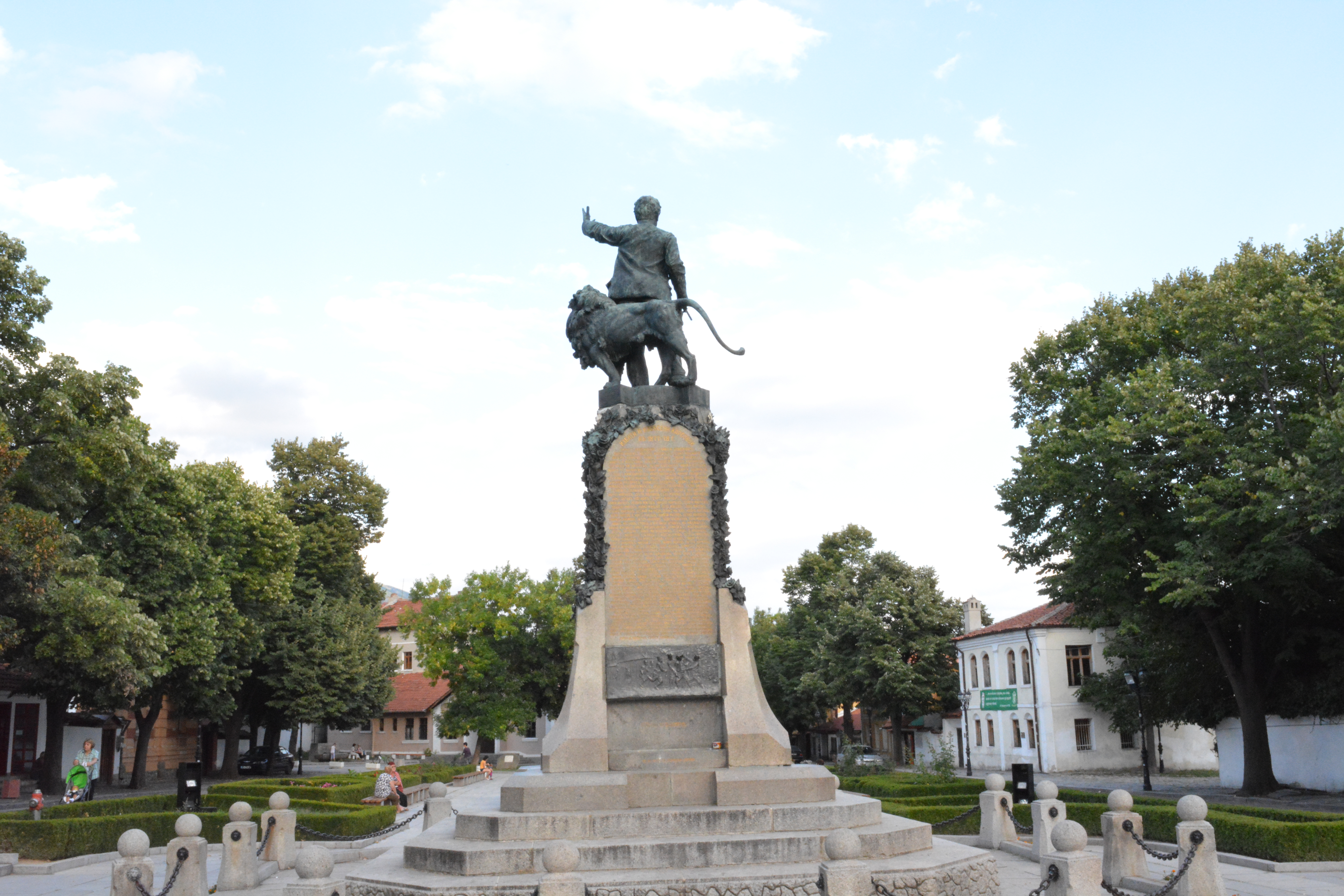

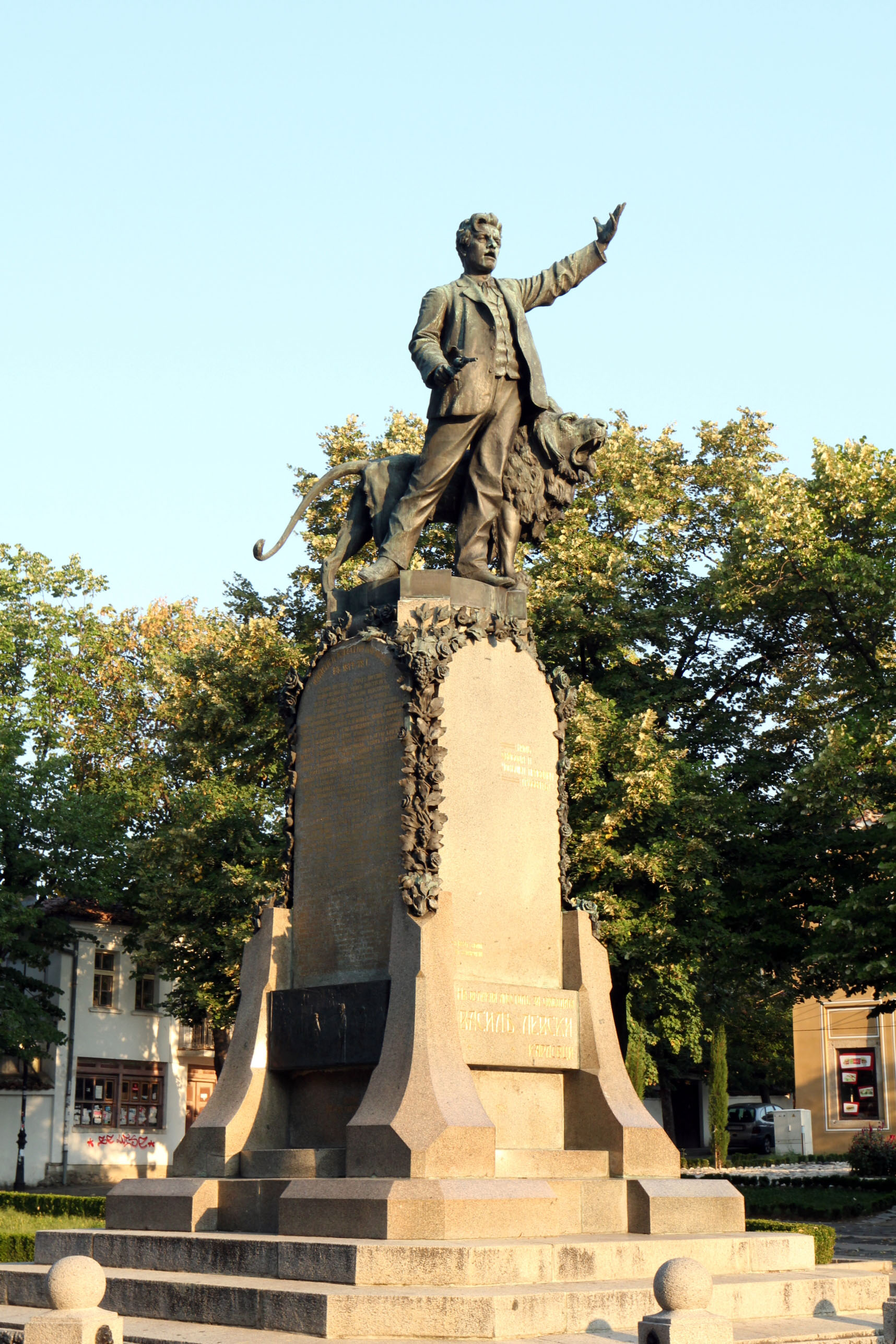
