= Karlovo =

Karlovo Карлово
- Town
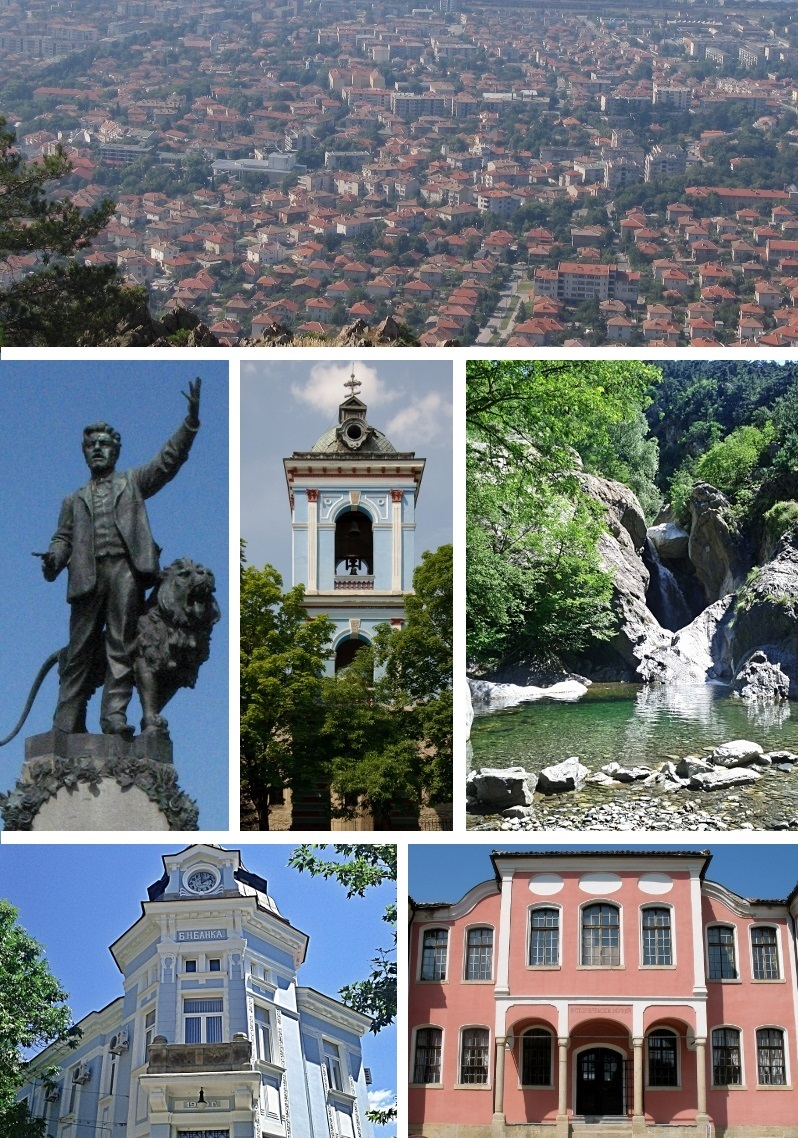
- View from Karlovo

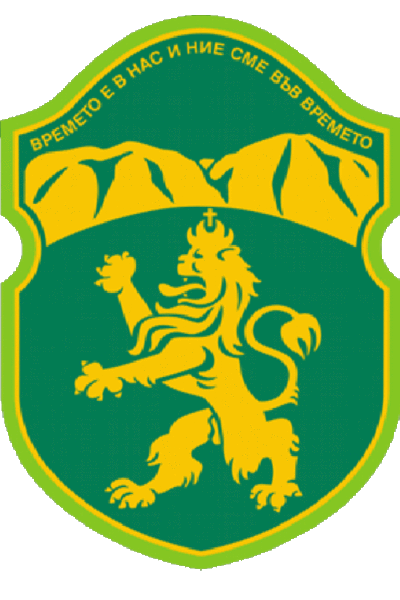
- Coat of arms

- Location of Karlovo
- Coordinates: 42°38′37″N 24°48′26″E
- Country: Bulgaria
- Province (Oblast): Plovdiv

Area
  - Total: 102.173 km^{2} (39.449 sq mi)
- Elevation: 452 m (1,483 ft)

Population (2022)
  - Total: 19,373
  - Density: 189.61/km^{2} (491.09/sq mi)
- Time zone: UTC+2 (EET)
  - Summer (DST): UTC+3 (EEST)
- Postal Code: 4300
- Area code: 335
- Website: Official website

Karlovo (Bulgarian: Карлово [ˈkarɫovo]) is a historically important town in central Bulgaria located in a fertile valley along the river Stryama at the southern foot of the Balkan Mountains. It is administratively part of Plovdiv Province and has a population of about 19,373 (as of 2021), the mayor being Dr. Emil Kabaivanov. Karlovo is famous for its rose oil, which is used in producing perfume. Karlovo is also the birthplace of Vasil Levski, the most distinguished Bulgarian to start preparing the national liberation from the Ottoman rule in the late 19th century. There is a museum and large monument dedicated to him. Karlovo is also a popular location for tourism in the region.

During the 2000s, Bulgarian archaeologists made discoveries in Central Bulgaria which were summarized as 'The Valley of the Thracian Kings'. On 19 August 2005, some archaeologists announced they had found the first Thracian capital, which was situated near Karlovo in Bulgaria. Many polished ceramic artifacts (pieces of roof-tiles and Greek-like vases) were discovered revealing the fortune of the town. The Bulgarian Ministry of Culture declared its support to the excavations.

== History ==
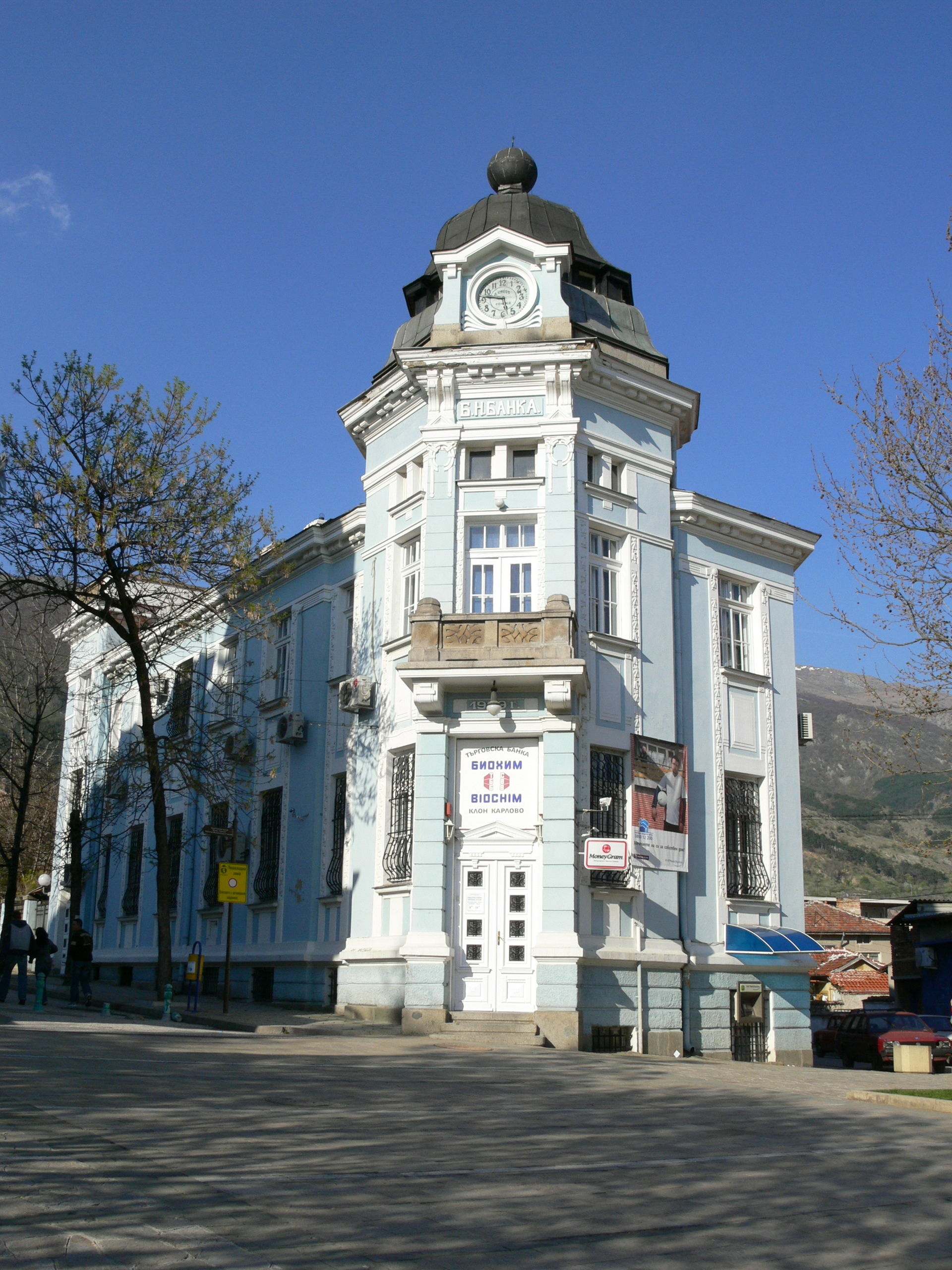
Bank in Karlovo

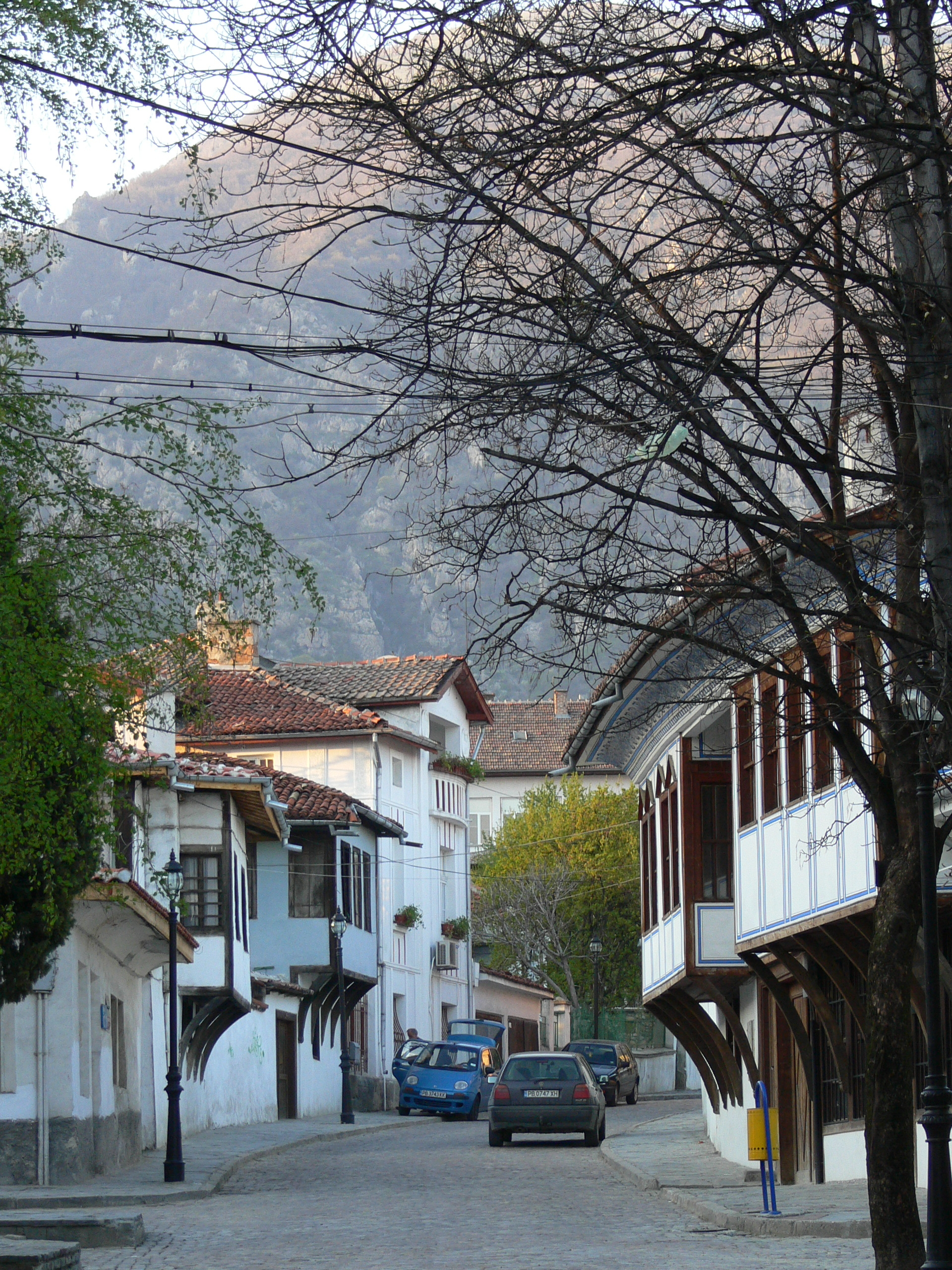
Street in Karlovo. Turkish-era buildings are still visible in the old town.

Karlovo is a successor of the medieval fortress of Kopsis (Копсис in Bulgarian, Kωψίς or Κόψη in Byzantine Greek), a feudal possession of Smilets of Bulgaria in the 13th-14th century during the Second Bulgarian Empire and the likely capital of his brother despotēs Voysil's short-lived realm.

The region became part of the Ottoman Empire in the late 14th century in the aftermath of the Bulgarian–Ottoman wars. The modern town originated in 1483 at the place of the village of Sushitsa (still today Sushitsa is one of Karlovo's districts) during the reign of Sultan Bayezit II, and was originally named Karlıova (Karlı's Plain) after its founder Karlızade Lala Ali Bey. The Kurshum Mosque (Leaden Mosque), built in 1485, is the oldest surviving building in the town, although today it is not in use.

There was once a longstanding dispute on town limits between Karlıova and nearby Sopot. Matters came to a head in 1633, when Sultan Murad IV had to personally issue a firman (imperial decree) and dispatched officials from Eski Zağra (Stara Zagora) and Istanbul to determine the borders between the two towns. The territorial dispute was decided in favour of Karlıova.

The town grew in importance in the 19th century as a centre of Bulgarian culture and revolutionary activity. In 1869 the first chitalishte was opened. In 1876 Lady Strangford arrived from Britain with relief for the people of Bulgaria following the massacres that followed the April Uprising. She built a hospital at Batak and eventually other hospitals were built at Radilovo, Panagiurishte, Perushtitsa, Petrich and here at Karlovo.

In the summer and autumn of 1877, the town was subject to a 5-month reign of terror by the Ottoman authorities and Circassian paramilitaries, which resulted in the death of 288 citizens and the capture and imprisonment of more than 500 additional town notables, many of whom were eventually hanged. In the following year, by virtue of the Treaty of Berlin (1878), Karlıova was incorporated into the newly-established autonomous province of Eastern Rumelia and renamed Karlovo after five centuries of Ottoman rule.

From 1953 until 1962, the town was called Levskigrad.

== Geography ==
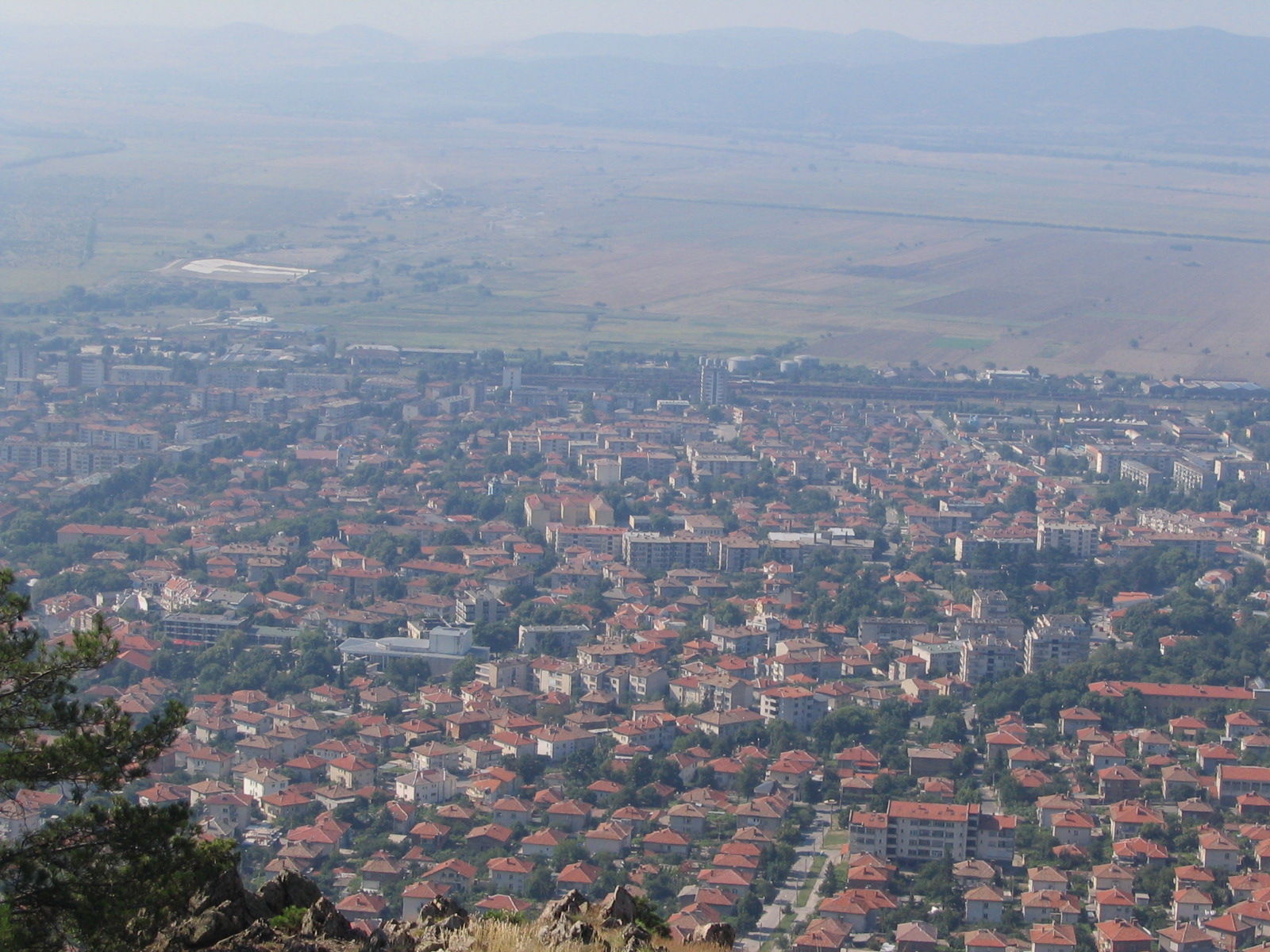
Karlovo viewed from Stara Planina

Karlovo lies at 42°38′N 24°48′E, 386 metres (1,266 feet) above sea level. It is located in the Karlovo Valley, also known as the Valley of Roses, renown for the large-scale production of roses. The Balkan Mountains rise above the town. The highest peak of this mountain range — Botev, 2376m — is close to Karlovo. The town is located 140 kilometres (87 miles) east from the Bulgarian capital — Sofia, and 60 km (37 mi) north from Plovdiv, the second biggest Bulgarian city and the capital of the Plovdiv Province.

=== Climate ===
The climate of the region is temperate continental, with mild and warm summers, refreshed by the wind coming down the Balkan Mountain, and snowy winters. The average January temperature is 0.1 °C (32.2 °F) (with an absolute minimum of −25.8 °C (−14.4 °F)). The average July temperature is 22.9 °C (73.2 °F) (with an absolute maximum of 39.6 °C (103.3 °F)).

Average total annual rainfall is 694 mm (27 in), being highest in the summer 221 mm (9 in), and lowest in the winter 169 mm (7 in).

== Infrastructure and transport ==
Karlovo is located on the main first class I-6 road (E78) Gyueshevo–Sofia–Burgas, one of the two roads which connect the capital Sofia to the southern part of the Black Sea. The town is an important point on the railway between Sofia and the commercially important Black Sea port of Burgas. There are frequent trains to the second biggest railway station in the country — Plovdiv. The total road length on the territory of Karlovo municipality is 301.4 km (187.3 mi). Karlovo is only 50 km (31 mi) away from the most important road in Bulgaria, the Trakiya motorway, part of the main route between Sofia and Istanbul. The first class I-5 road, leading to Bucharest in the north and the Aegean Sea in the south, is some 50 km (31 mi) east of the town.

== Municipality ==
Historical population
Year	Pop.	±%
1946	8,903	—
1956	12,663	+42.2%
1965	20,295	+60.3%
1975	25,515	+25.7%
1985	28,302	+10.9%
1992	27,291	−3.6%
2001	25,494	−6.6%
2011	23,075	−9.5%
2021	19,853	−14.0%
Source: pop-stat.mashke.org

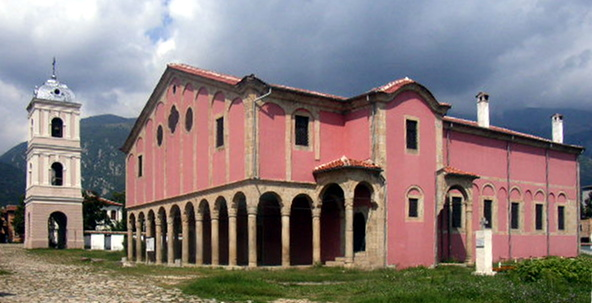
Orthodox Church Saint Nikolas

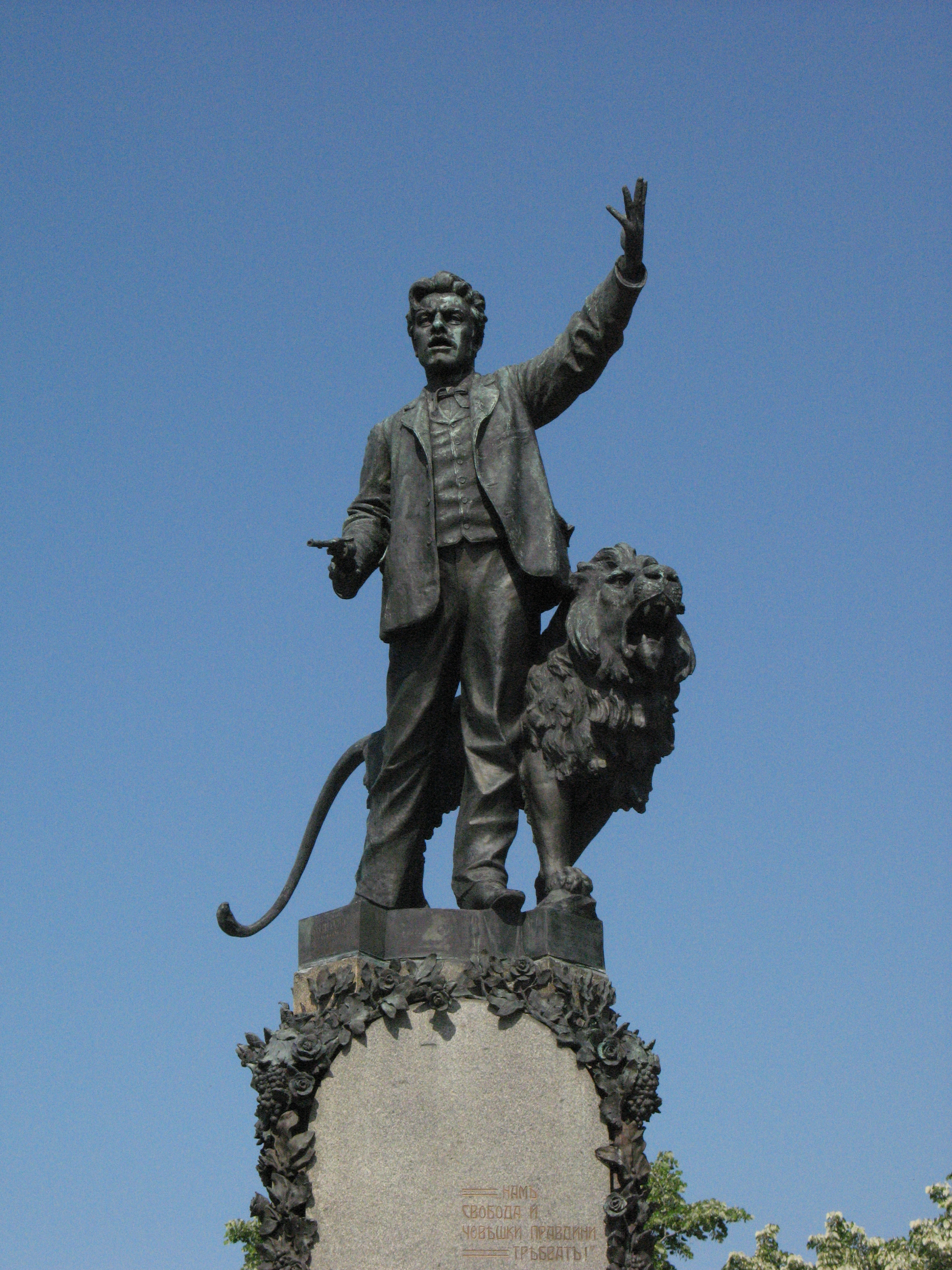
The monument of Vasil Levski

Karlovo is the seat of Karlovo municipality of Plovdiv Province. The population of the Karlovo municipality is approximately 73,000 people. It includes the following 27 towns and villages (towns in bold):

- **Banya**
- Beguntsi
- Bogdan
- Dabene
- Domlyan
- Gorni Domlyan
- Hristo Danovo
- Iganovo
- **Kalofer**
- Karavelovo
- **Karlovo**
- Karnare
- Kliment
- **Klisura**
- Kurtovo
- Marino Pole
- Moskovets
- Mrachenik
- Pevtsite
- Rozino
- Slatina
- Sokolitsa
- Stoletovo
- Vasil Levski
- Vedrare
- Voynyagovo

== Notable events ==
- The Day of the Rose in the first days of June
- Anniversary of Vasil Levski's death
- Anniversary of Vasil Levski's birth - each year on the evening of the 18th of July, one can enjoy a huge firework show in the revolutionary hero's honor.

== Attractions ==
=== Landmarks ===
- **Suchurum Waterfall.** The 15-metre-high (49-foot) Suchurum (flying water) waterfall is also known as the Karlovo waterfall.

It is located right below the Karlovo water-power station, on the left tributary of Stryama River - Stara Reka, taking its sources from the two tributaries – the Malkata Reka springing South of the peaks of Ambaritsa and Malak Kupen and Golyamata River – springing South below the peak of Zhultets. With its number of rapids, small pools and chutes above Karlovo, Stara Reka descends from 15 metres (49 feet) in a waterfall.

- **'Central Balkan' National Park.** The 'Central Balkan' National Park is situated in the heart of Bulgaria, in the central and highest parts of the Balkan Mountain. The highest peak in the Park is Botev peak (2376). The lowest point is situated near Karlovo, on altitude of 500 metres (1,600 feet). The park occupies a total area of 72 021 ha and includes parts of the territories of 5 administrative areas – Lovech, Gabrovo, Stara Zagora, Plovdiv and Sofia. The Park includes 9 natural reserves – 'Boatin', 'Tsarichina', 'Kozya Stena', 'Steneto', 'Severen Dzhendem', 'Peeshti Skali', 'Sokolna', 'Dzhendema' and 'Stara Reka'. The reserves occupy an area of 20,019.6 ha. Eight of them (excluding 'Kozya Stena') and 'Central Balkan' Park are included in the UN list of national parks and other protected territories. Boatin, Tsarichina, Dzhendema and Steneto are a part of the network of biosphere reserves. In 2003 the 'Central Balkan' National Park became a member of PAN Parks, which is an international appraisal of its well preserved and managed wild nature. In 2004 a holder of the PAN Parks certificate is also the park region.

=== Museums ===
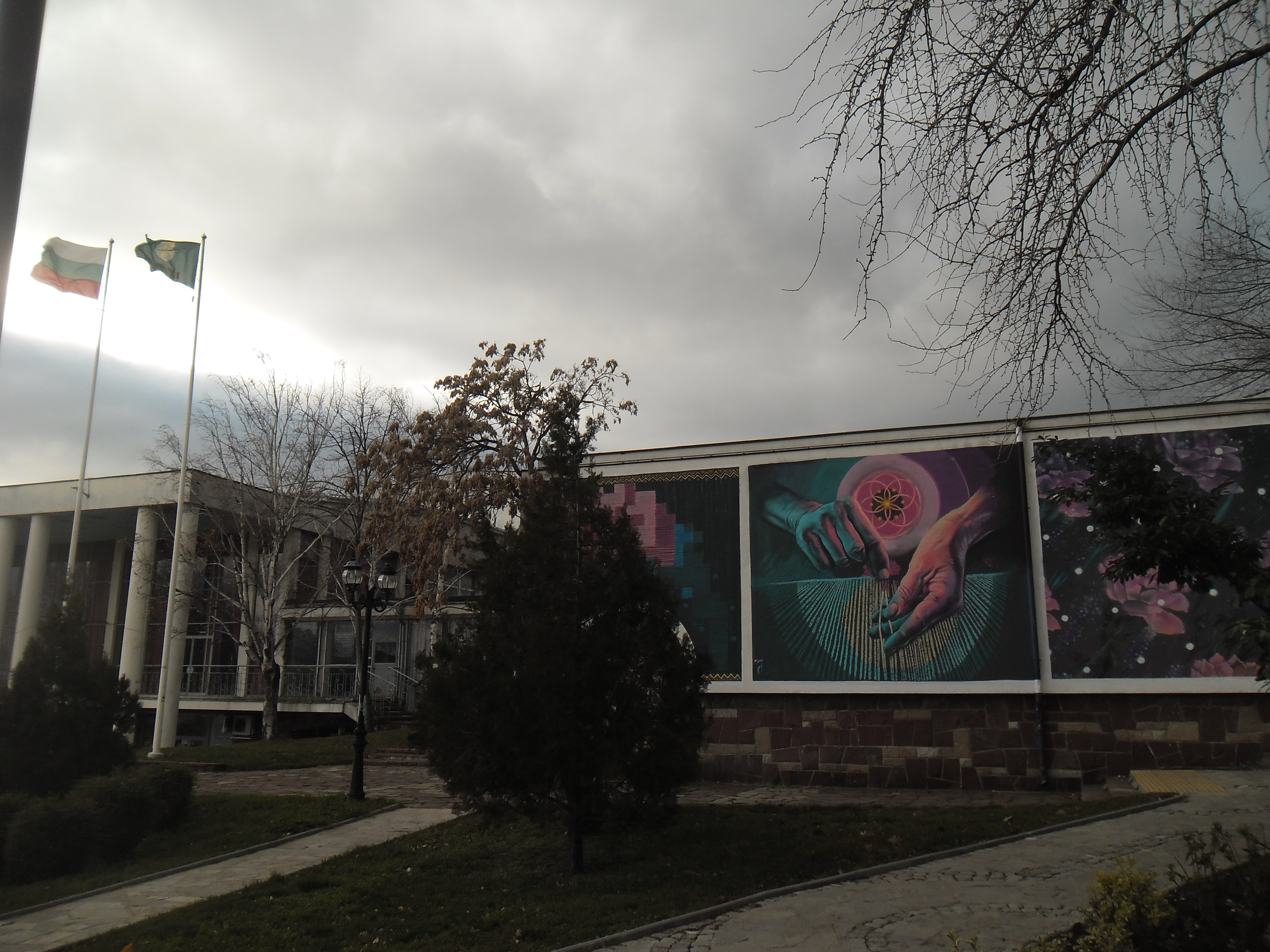
Mural on the wall of Karlovo's public library.

- **'Vasil Levski' National Museum.** The 'Vasil Levski' National Museum is dedicated to Vasil Levski and covers his house, exhibition hall, 'All Bulgarian Saints' Memorial Chapel, and Chardaklievata house. For several decades it has collected and stored belongings, documents and photos relating to family life and work of Vasil Levski, its associates and from Karlovo and other parts of the country. It Keeps almost all scientific research and biographical literature devoted to Levski works of art. In 2000, the museum complex was built and designed by architect Mary Karazlateva in honour of the Apostle. It keeps part of his hair. National Museum 'Vasil Levski' is part of the 100 Tourist Sites of Bulgaria by the Bulgarian Tourist Union.Open year-round. Summer Hours: 8:30 - 13:00 and 14:00 to 17:30; Winter hours: 08:00 to 13:00 and 14:00 to 17:00.

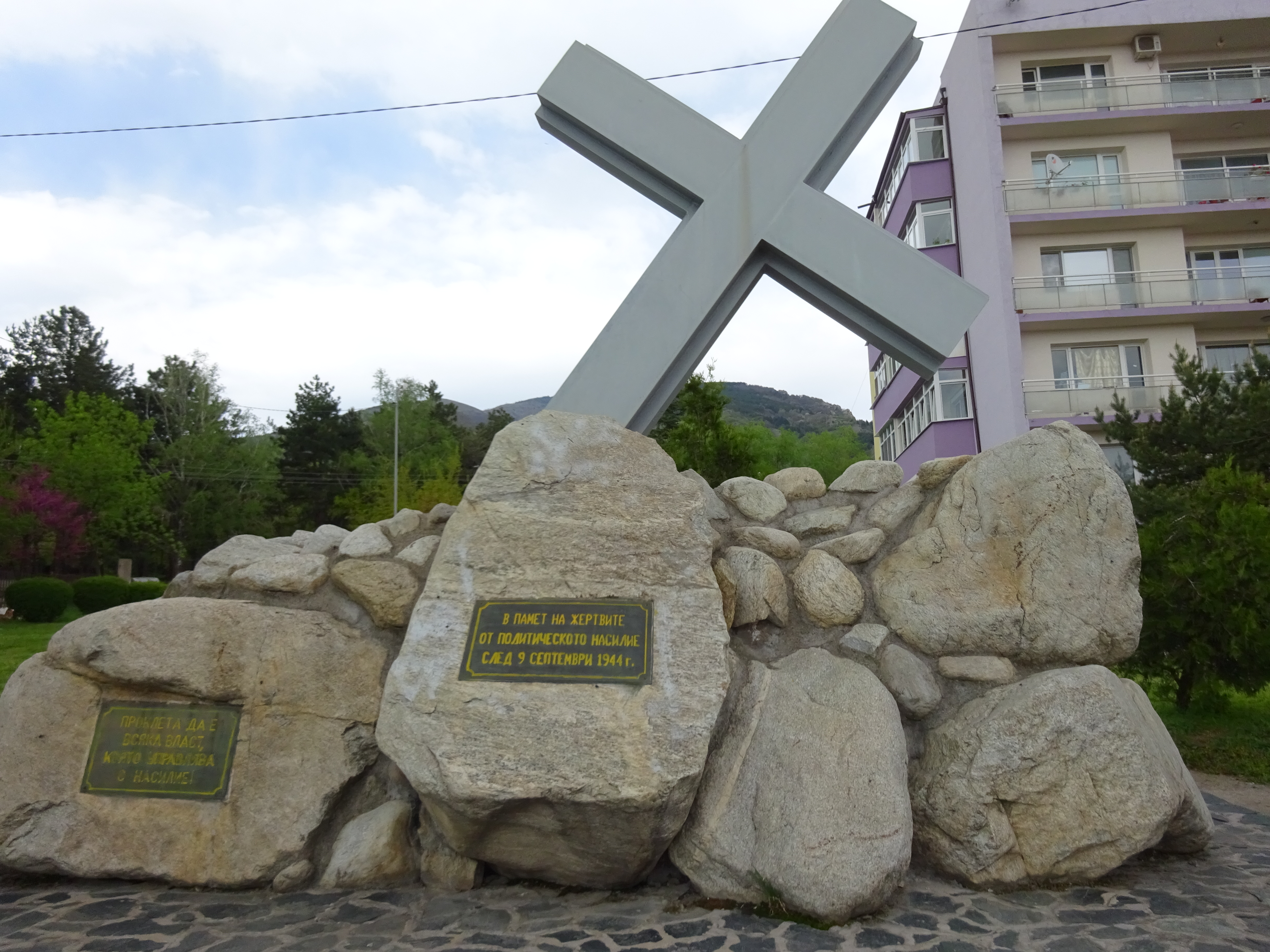
Memorial in Karlovo

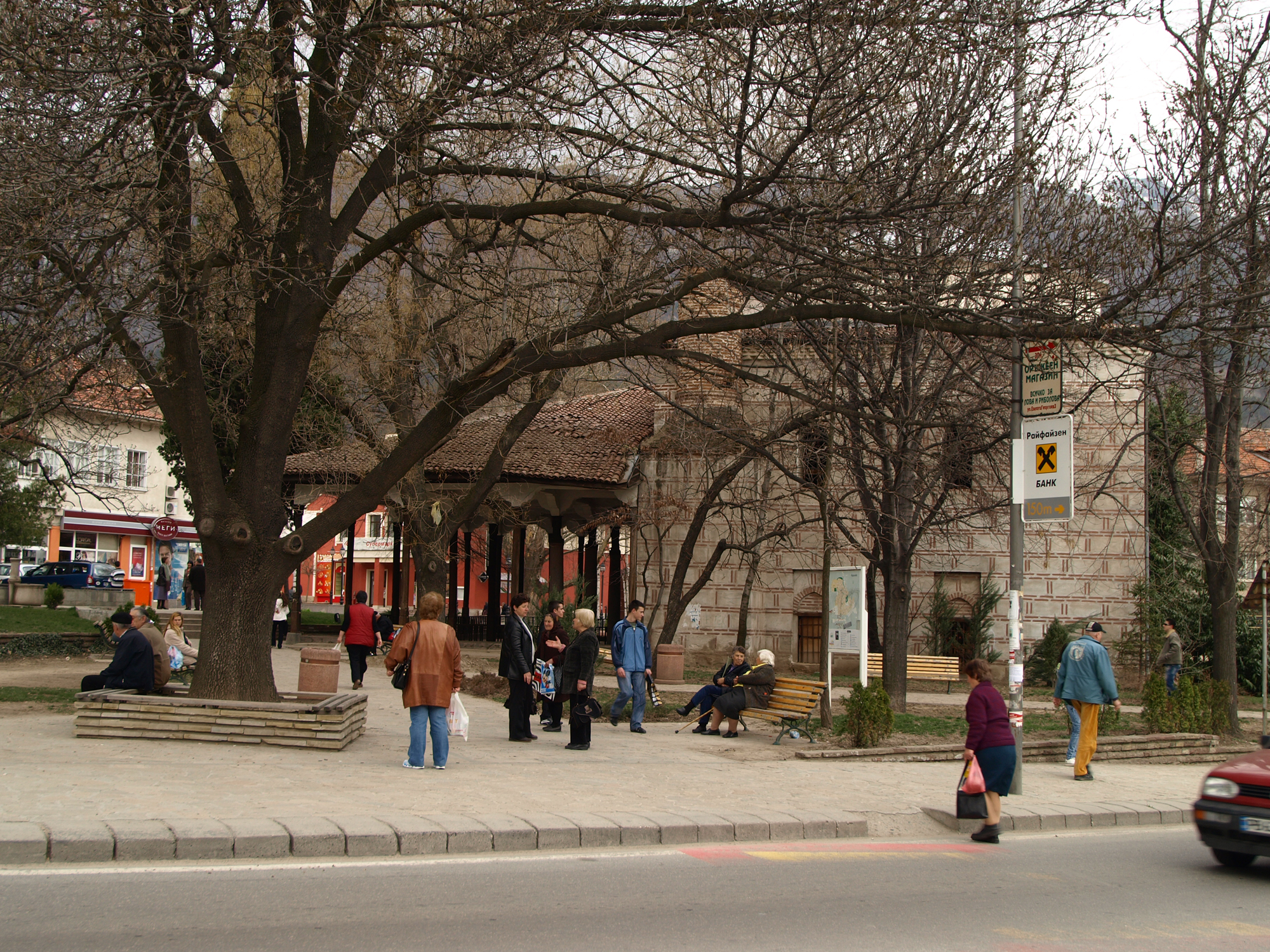
Kursum Mosque, built at the beginning of the 15th century

- **Municipal Historical Museum - Karlovo.** The museum exposition is settled in the building of the ancient Bulgarian school, a significant architectural and historical monument of culture (1871). Two are the main expositions: 'Ethnography' and 'Bulgarian National Revival'. Special attention is to be paid to the Ethnographic department, where art jewelers, tissues and tools of ancient crafts are collected and exposed. A huge number of documents and belongings of the economic, cultural and social life in the town of Karlovo are exposed in 'The Bulgarian Revival' department. Part of the museum is also the ethnographic collection in the Mazakova house built around 1848. It is located in the Old Town of Karlovo and is an architectural and historical cultural monument. A permanent ethnographic exhibition is arranged in it, presenting original fabrics, traditional costumes of Karlovo, domestic crafts and more.

The museum is open year-round working hours: 08:00 to 12:00 and 13:00 to 17:00 pm.

- **Architectural and Historical Reserve 'The Old Town'.** It has preserved the spirit of the Bulgarian National Revival despite the modern architectural style. This part of the town has preserved about 115 houses, monuments of culture. The old houses of Karlovo have high architectural value with their woodcarved ceilings, the yards with decorative doors and marvelous Murals on the stonewalls, the silent cobbled yards and shady vines, box shrub and flower gardens.
- **The Bouhalov Han (Inn).** The inn was once used to host the Bulgarian Revolutionary Central Committee founded by Vassil Levski; as well as the meetings of the Karlovo 'Friends of Learning' group. The first 'Abstention from Drinking' Association was also founded in the inn. Later on, until the end of the 1950s, the town’s Community Centre and the Library had been hosted in that building. According to the will of Kirko Bouhalov’s daughter, Penka Popova, the building was donated to the town in 1937. During the 1970s, the building was transformed into a students’ hostel but, due to its poor condition, the town authorities closed it. For 20 years the Bouhalov Han (Inn) had been staying lifeless and slowly turning to ruins, thus taking away part of the Revival Period history of that town. The building is now a Handicrafts’ Centre, since Karlovo has preserved alive even today the traditional handicrafts, such as: Goldsmith’s and Coppersmith’s trade, carpet industry, Pottery, woolen braiding manufacturing, Wood carving, cooperage, Engraving, icon-painting (Iconography), Kalofer lace and many others.

=== Other ===
- **The Vasil Levski Monument.** The impressive monument of Vasil Levski was built in 1903 - 1907 by Marin Vasilev and is situated in the centre of the Old town of Karlovo, near the St. Nikola church. The sculptor has depicted the Apostle of freedom Vasil Levski in full length, with a revolver in his hand. Next to him stands the roaring lion (i.e. the people). The low relief on both sides of the monument is covered with the names of the people from Karlovo who died for the Liberation of Bulgaria.

== Culture ==
=== Education ===
The library counts about 68,000 library documents and books.

=== Religion ===
Orthodox Church Saint Nikolas was built in 1847 by Nikola Troyanov.

== Notable people ==
- Avram Dimitrievich (17th century), priest, first teacher, skilled writer and calligrapher
- Anka Lambreva (1895 - 1976), traveler
- Anna Laleva Zaimova (Atanasova) (1894 - 1983), wife of Gen. Vladimir Zaimov
- Botyo Petkov (1815 - 1869), Revival teacher and father of Hristo Botev
- Braiko H. Genov (1814 - 1865), teacher, priest, collector of folk vocabulary - riddles, proverbs
- Vasil Karaivanov (1847 - 1933), cousin and supporter of Levski
- Vasil Kirkov (1870 - 1931), dramatic artist, one of the founders of the Bulgarian National Theater
- Vasil Levski (1837 - 1873), revolutionary and national hero
- Ivan Nochev (1916 - 1991), participated in the invention of the engines of the module (reached the moon) "Eagle" of "Apollo-11"
- Evlogi Georgiev (1819 - 1897), entrepreneur, industrialist, philanthropist
- Elena Snezhina (1882 - 1944), the first Bulgarian dramatic actress
- Ivan Bogorov (1818 - 1892), Bulgarian educator, publicist, journalist and encyclopedist, guardian of the purity of the Bulgarian language.
- Ivan Lazarov (1890 - 1952), sculptor
- Ivan Popov (1865 - 1966), founder of the Bulgarian theater and its historian
- Kostadin Georgiev, a revolutionary from the IMRO, a Chetnik of Stefan Dimitrov
- Stoycho Kerev (1965), journalist, producer and media expert, "Question of Perspective" and "New Knowledge", author, lecturer and communicator of methods for behavior and analysis
- Raina Kasabova (1897 - 1969), participated in the first combat flight in the world, throwing summons over Edirne
- Lazar Lazarov (1864 -1948), Bulgarian officer, lieutenant general
- Lazar Nenkov Lazarov (1941 - 2006), artist
- Maria Simova (1920 - 1977), dramatic artist and playwright
- Mikhail Ganchev (1872 - 1931), Bulgarian military and revolutionary
- Nikolay Stoyanov (1948), Bulgarian writer and translator
- Paisii Karavelov (1891 - 1944), Bulgarian clergyman and public figure
- Pencho Radov, Bulgarian Revival book publisher and bookseller
- Petko Abadjiev (born 1913), artist
- Petar Alexandrov (born 1962), footballer, national, bronze medalist at the 1994 World Cup in the United States.
- Peter Tantilov (1861 - 1937), military figure, lieutenant general
- Peter Yurukov (1882 - 1905), revolutionary
- Hadji Todor Sahatchiev (unknown - 1877), Revival educator, merchant
- Rayno Popovich (1773 - 1858), a teacher and writer from Kotel, called the "teacher of teachers"
- Rangel Gerovski (1959 - 2004), Bulgarian wrestler, Olympic medalist
- Stefan Nikolov, revolutionary from VMORO, Chetnik of Stefan Dimitrov
- Stefan x. Ivanov, Bulgarian revolutionary from VMORO, Chetnik of Kocho Tsonkov
- Hristo Georgiev (1824 - 1872), entrepreneur
- Hristo Mutafchiev (born 1969), actor
- Hristo Prodanov (1943 - 1984), climber, climbed Everest
- Hristo Stoyanov, Bulgarian revolutionary from VMORO, Chetnik of Tane Nikolov
- Hristo Dzhapunov (1850 - 1908), who constructed a machine for shoe sticks, became an attraction at the first Bulgarian exhibition in Plovdiv in 1892.
- Vasil Banov, July 26, 1946, actor
- Nelly Petkova (b. 1983), pop and folklore singer

== Honour ==
Karlovo Peak on Livingston Island in the South Shetland Islands, Antarctica is named after Karlovo.

== Town twinning ==
- Bryansk, Bryansk Oblast, Russia
- Katerini, Greece
- Osio Sotto, Italy
- Konin, Poland
- Baranovichi, Belarus
- Seeheim-Jugenheim, Germany, since 2018

== See also ==
The Terror (1877)
