= Lyulin Peak =

Peak on Livingston Island, Antarctica

Location of Tangra Mountains on Livingston Island in the South Shetland Islands.

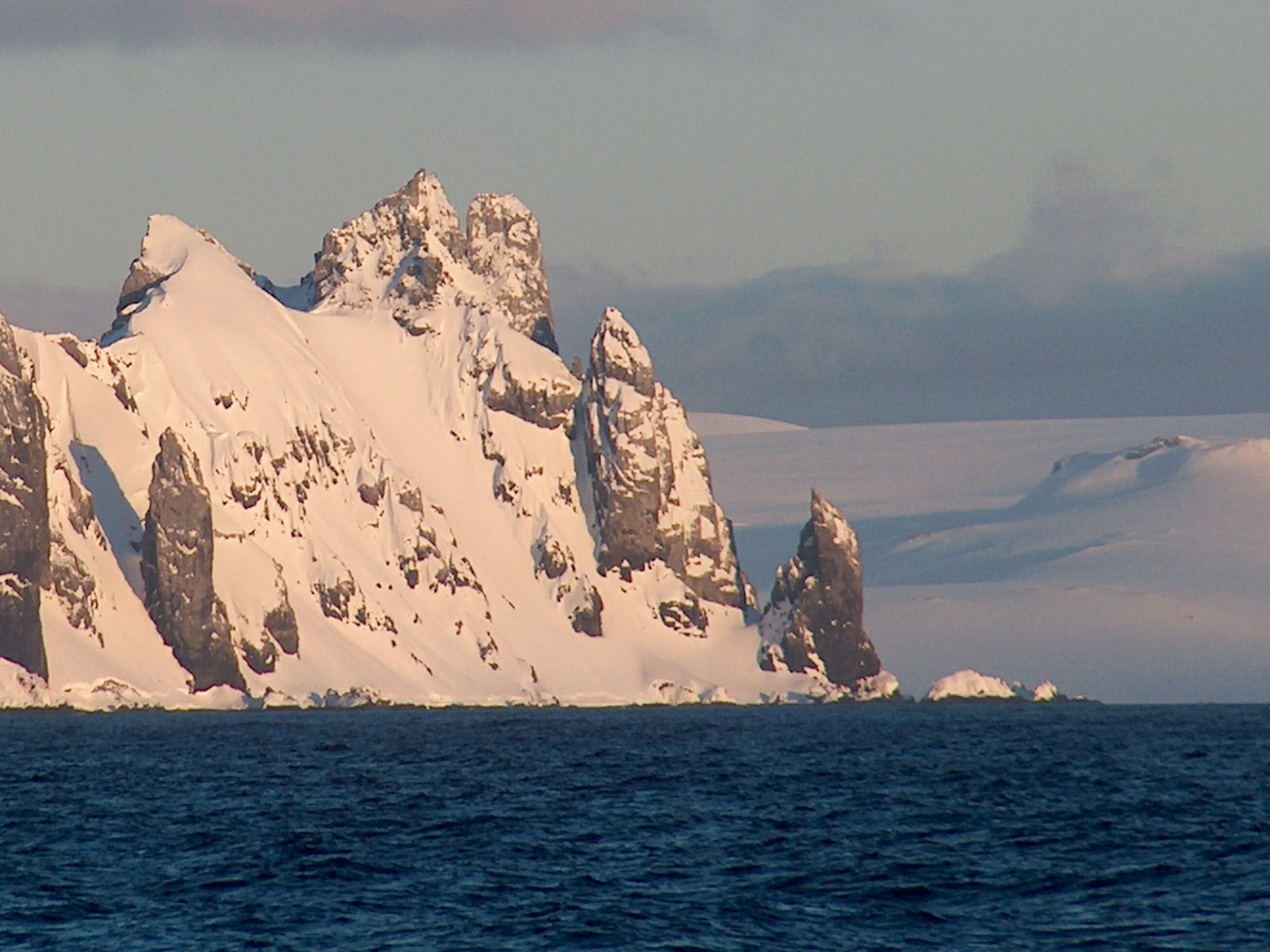
Lyulin Peak from Bransfield Strait.

Topographic map of Livingston Island and Smith Island.

Lyulin Peak (Bulgarian: връх Люлин, romanized: vrah Lyulin, IPA: [ˈvrɤx ʎoˈlin]) is a sharp double peak forming the east extremity of Delchev Ridge and Tangra Mountains, eastern Livingston Island in the South Shetland Islands, Antarctica. The peaks rise to approximately 200 m, have rocky, ice-free slopes and surmount Renier Point. The peaks are named after Lyulin Mountain in Bulgaria.

== Location ==
The peak is located at 62°36′38.7″S 59°48′34″W which is 7.18 km east-northeast of Delchev Peak, 1.63 km northeast of Mesta Peak and 390 m northeast of Bansko Peak (Bulgarian mapping in 2005 and 2009).

== Maps ==
- L.L. Ivanov et al. Antarctica: Livingston Island and Greenwich Island, South Shetland Islands. Scale 1:100000 topographic map. Sofia: Antarctic Place-names Commission of Bulgaria, 2005.
- L.L. Ivanov. Antarctica: Livingston Island and Greenwich, Robert, Snow and Smith Islands. Scale 1:120000 topographic map. Troyan: Manfred Wörner Foundation, 2009.
