= Teodor Kufel =

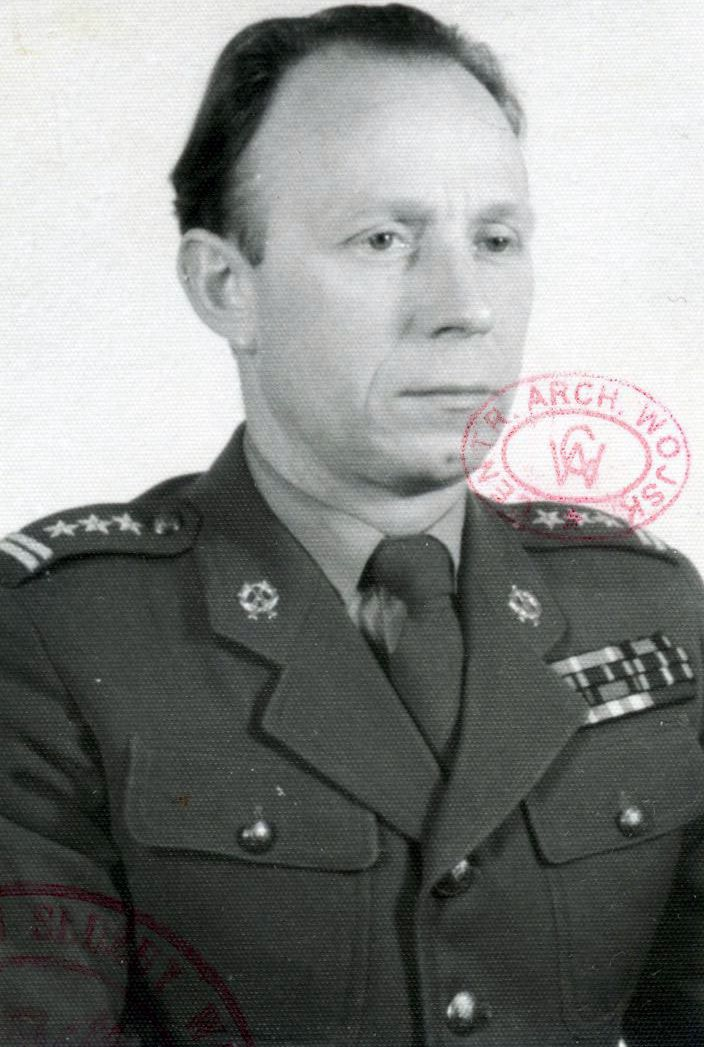
- Teodor Kufel (in rank of Colonel) in 1965
- Born: 6 March 1920; Bielsk, Poland
- Died: 17 October 2016 (aged 96); Warsaw, Poland
- Military career
- Branch: Internal Military Service
- Service years: 1940–1981
- Rank: Divisional general
- Nicknames: Teoch, Ryszard Jankowski
- Conflicts: World War II; Warsaw Uprising

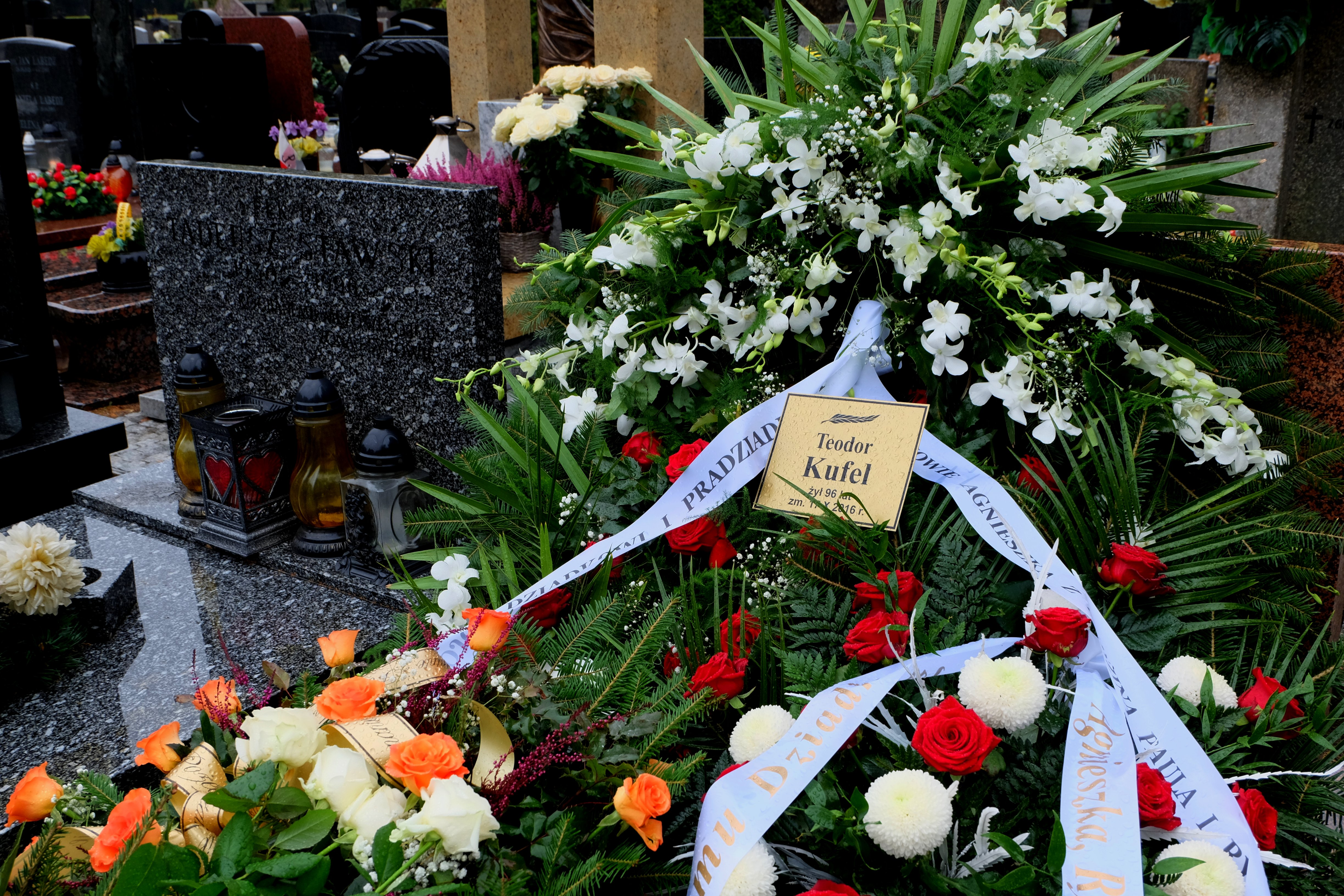
The grave of Teodor Kufel at the Powązki Military Cemetery on the day of the funeral

Teodor Kufel, pseudonym Teoch, Ryszard Jankowski (6 March 1920 – 17 October 2016) was a Polish military and political activist. During World War II he was active in the anti-Nazi movement. After the war, he served as a general in the Polish People's Army. From 1964 to 1979 he was commander of the Internal Military Service.

== Biography ==
He came from a working class family of German descent. He was active in the youth organization of the People's Party. From 1936 to 1938 he was a member of the Young Communist League of Poland. In 1937 he was arrested for his political activities by the Sanation authorities.

From 1940, he was active in the underground communist organization Revolutionary Workers' and Peasants' Councils "Hammer and Sickle". In 1942, this organization became part of the Polish Workers' Party. Teodor Kufel became part of the District Staff of the People's Guard as an intelligence and operations officer. On 25 December 1943, he was one of the first to be awarded of the Order of the Cross of Grunwald. In April 1944 he became a liaison officer in the Main Staff of the People's Army. After the outbreak of the Warsaw Uprising, he fought as an officer in the Battalion of the People's Army "Men of the Fourth". He was a company commander in the Warsaw Old Town and Żoliborz. In September, he actively resisted the German troops in the Kampinos Forest. From October 1944 he was the commander of the Warsaw District Left Suburban People's Army.

From February 1945 he was an officer in the Citizens' Militia. From 1954 he was an officer of the Ministry of Public Security. From 1954 to 1955 he was a student of the KGB school in Moscow. In 1958 he passed as a colonel to military counterintelligence being part of the Internal Military Service. From 1964 he was the head of this formation. In October 1965, by resolution of the Polish Council of State, he was promoted to the rank of brigadier general. He was nominated in Belweder by Edward Ochab.

He is co-responsible for the execution of Anti-Zionist purge in the Polish Army. In the 1960s, he belonged to an influential group of "partisans" gathered around general Mieczysław Moczar.

In October 1971 he was appointed a major general. In April 1979 he took the position of General Director at the Ministry of Foreign Affairs. From 1979 to 1981 he was the head of the Polish Military Mission in West Berlin. In 1981 he was removed from professional military service.

From 1948 to 1981 he belonged to the Polish United Workers' Party. He was a delegate to the IV, V, VI and VII congress of this party. From 1971 to 1980 he was a deputy member of Central Committee of the Polish United Workers' Party. From 1972 he was the vice president of Legia Warsaw. From 1974 to 1979, a member of the Presidium of the Supreme Council of the Society of Fighters for Freedom and Democracy.

While retired, he was active in veterans' organizations. From 2001 he was a member of the Board of the National Association of the Knights of the Order of the Grunwald Cross. From 1996 to 2000 he was the chairman of the Main Audit Commission of the National Council of People's Army Soldiers. He also served as the vice president of the Veterans' Assistance and Promotion Foundation.

Teodor Kufel's military views and political positions underwent significant evolution in the 1990s. He accepted Poland's membership in NATO. In 1996 he became one of the organizers and the most important activists of the Polish Army Generals Club, an influential organization of retired military commanders associated with the Ministry of National Defense and the General Staff of the Polish Armed Forces.

He supported Bronisław Komorowski, who is applying for re-election, before the 2015 Polish presidential election. In March 2016, his apartment was searched and the documents found were handed over to the Institute of National Remembrance.

Teodor Kufel was buried at the Powązki Military Cemetery in Warsaw.

== Awards and decorations ==
- Polish
  - Order of the Banner of Labour, 1st Class (twice, 1968 and 1972)
  - Order of the Cross of Grunwald, 3rd Class (25 December 1943)
  - Commander's Cross of Order of Polonia Restituta (1964)
  - Officer's Cross of Order of Polonia Restituta
  - Knight's Cross of Order of Polonia Restituta
  - Silver Cross of Virtuti Militari (1945)
  - Golden Cross of Merit, (four times)
  - Silver Cross of Merit
  - Partisan Cross (1951)
  - Warsaw Uprising Cross (1982)
  - Medal of the 30th Anniversary of People's Poland (1974)
  - Medal of the 40th Anniversary of People's Poland (1984)
  - Medal for Warsaw 1939–1945
  - Medal of Victory and Freedom 1945 (1946)
  - Golden Medal of the Armed Forces in the Service of the Fatherland (1968)
  - Medal of the 10th Anniversary of People's Poland (1955)
  - Medal for Participation in the Battle of Berlin (1971)
  - Golden Medal of Merit for National Defence (1973)
  - Silver Medal of Merit for National Defence (1968)
  - Bronze Medal of Merit for National Defence (1966)
  - Medal of the National Education Commission
  - Silver Badge of Merit in the Protection of Public Order (1976)
  - Bronze Badge of Merit in the Protection of Public Order (1973)
  - Golden Decoration of the name of Janek Krasicki (1959)
- Soviet:
  - Order of the Red Banner (1968)
  - Order of Friendship of Peoples (1973)
  - Medal "For the Victory over Germany in the Great Patriotic War 1941–1945"
  - Jubilee Medal "Twenty Years of Victory in the Great Patriotic War 1941–1945" (1972)
  - Jubilee Medal "Forty Years of Victory in the Great Patriotic War 1941–1945" (1985)
  - Jubilee Medal "60 Years of the Armed Forces of the USSR" (1978)
- Other countries:
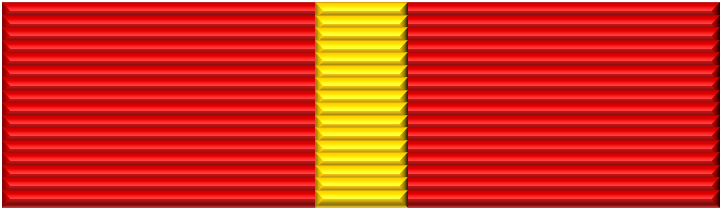
  - Friendship Medal (Vietnam)
  - Golden Medal Brotherhood in Arms (East Germany)
  - 30th Anniversary of the Bulgarian People's Army. (Bulgaria, 1974)
  - Jubilee Medal "50 Years of Victory in the Great Patriotic War 1941–1945" (Russia, 1995)

== Bibliography ==
- Janusz Królikowski, Generałowie i admirałowie Wojska Polskiego 1943-1990, Toruń 2010, ISBN 978-83761-180-17.
