= Marin Vasilev =

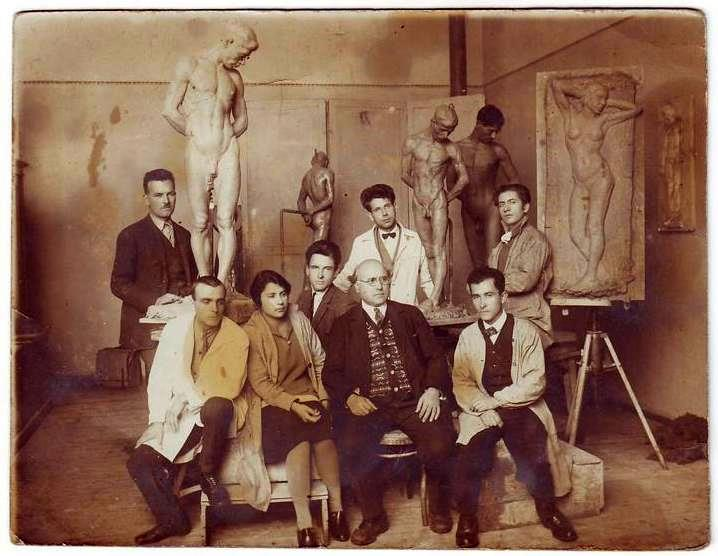
Marin Vasilev with his students (1928)

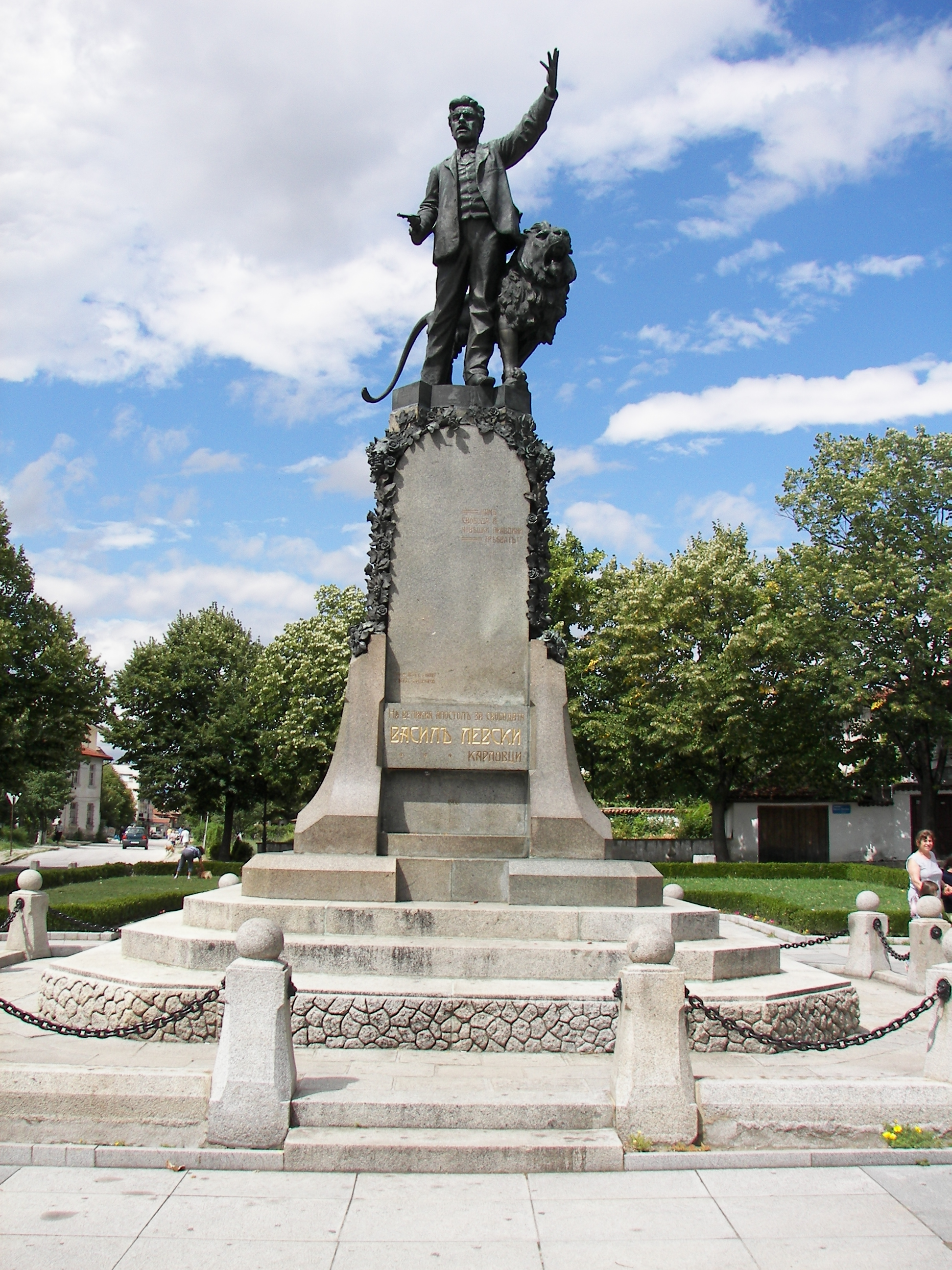
The Vasil Levski Monument, Karlovo

Marin Vasilev Selovlev, known professionally as Marin Vasilev (Bulgarian: Марин Василев; 27 August 1867, Shumen – 14 December 1931, Sofia) was a Bulgarian sculptor and art professor. Together with Boris Schatz and Zheko Spiridonov, he is considered to be a founding figure of modern Bulgarian sculpture.

== Life and work ==
After graduating from teacher training in 1886, he studied sculpture and stoneworking at a newly created vocational school in Hořice; a city known for its high-quality sandstone. He graduated in 1890 and taught at a state-run arts and crafts school in Sofia.

He was there for only about a year, when he left to study decorative and monumental sculpting at the Academy of Fine Arts, Munich. His primary instructor there was Syrius Eberle. From 1894 to 1896, he studied composition at the Academy of Fine Arts, Prague, with Josef Václav Myslbek. In 1899, he returned to Sofia, once again teaching at the arts and crafts school. Later, he moved to a position at the National Academy of Art, where he was named a professor in 1911.

His works were influenced by the Munich Secession. His best known creations include the Vasil Levski Monument in Karlovo (1903), and the sculptures on the façade on the Bank of Sofia; now the DSK Bank (1914). He also created monuments to the publisher, Hristo G. Danov (1909), the revolutionary, Georgi Izmirliev (1909), the writer and diplomat, Ivan Shishmanov (1920), the Irish-born journalist, James David Bourchier (1923), and a leader of the April Uprising, Stoyan Zaimov (1929); as well as a monument in Svishtov, dedicated to those who died to free that city during the Russo-Turkish War.

== Death ==
He died suddenly, while teaching a class at the National Academy.

== Sources ==
- "A memory of Prof. Dr.Sc.(Econ.) Marin Vasilev - the man who created the monument of Vasil Levski in Karlovo" by Iliana Ivanova @ Glasove
- Енциклопедия на изобразителните изкуства в България (Encyclopedia of Fine Arts in Bulgaria), Vol.1, BAN publishing, Sofia, 1980
- Енциклопедия България (Encyclopedia Bulgarica), Vol.1, BAN publishing, Sofia, 1978
