= Malyovitsa Crag =

Location of Tangra Mountains on Livingston Island in the South Shetland Islands.

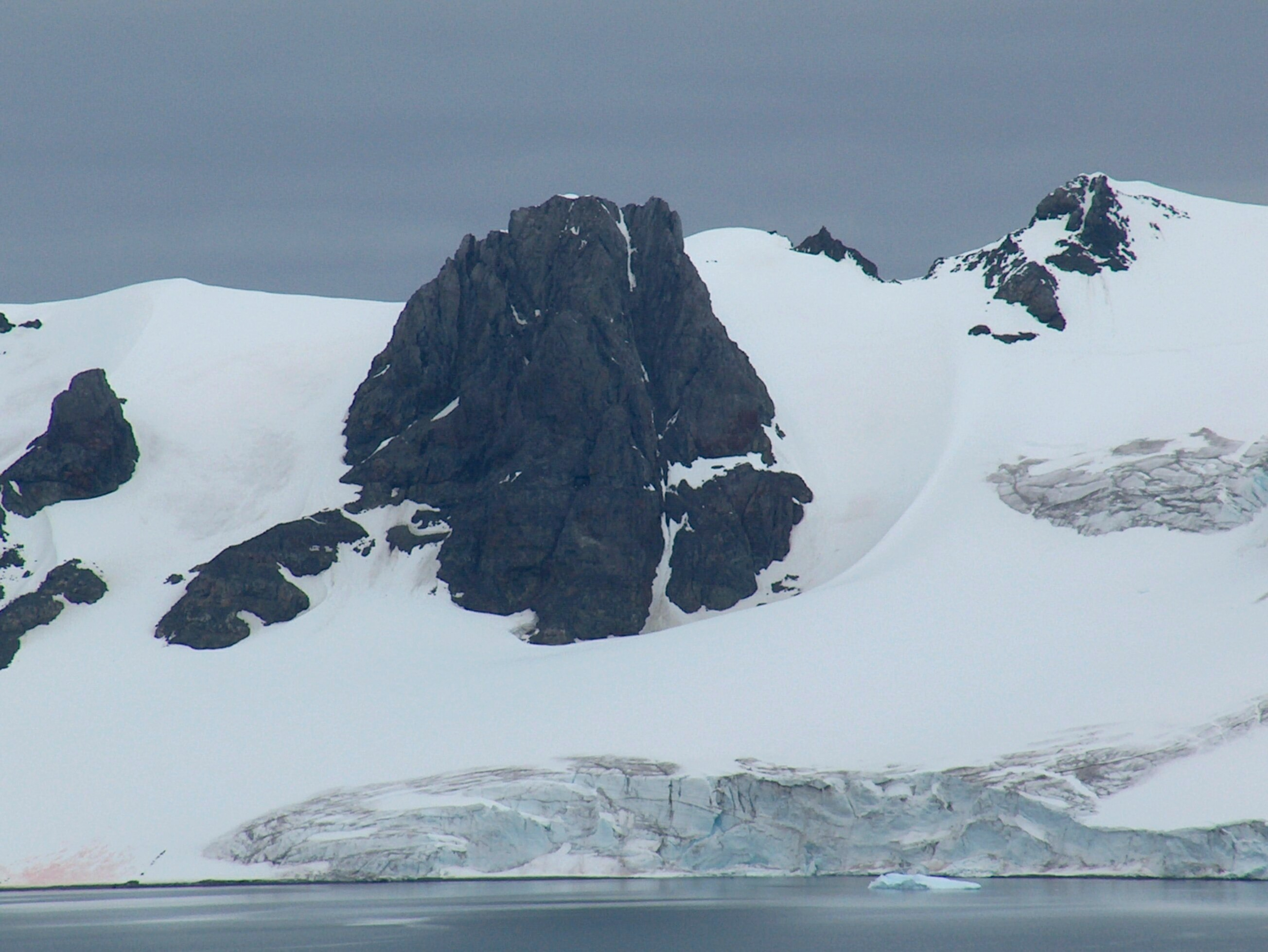
Malyovitsa Crag from Half Moon Island.

Topographic map of Livingston Island, Greenwich, Robert, Snow and Smith Islands.

Malyovitsa Crag (Malyovishki Kamak \ma-'lyo-vish-ki 'ka-m&k\) is a rocky peak rising to 290 m in the east extremity of Delchev Ridge, Tangra Mountains on Livingston Island in the South Shetland Islands, Antarctica. Surmounting Sopot Ice Piedmont to the west. The peak is named after Malyovitsa Peak in Rila Mountain, western Bulgaria.

== Location ==
The crag is located at 62°36′55.2″S 59°49′21.5″W, which is 500 m west-southwest of Bansko Peak, and 280 m north-northeast of Karlovo Peak (Bulgarian topographic survey Tangra 2004/05 and mapping in 2009).

== Map ==
- L.L. Ivanov. Antarctica: Livingston Island and Greenwich, Robert, Snow and Smith Islands. Scale 1:120000 topographic map. Troyan: Manfred Wörner Foundation, 2009.
