= Nelly Petkova =

Bulgarian singer (born 1983)

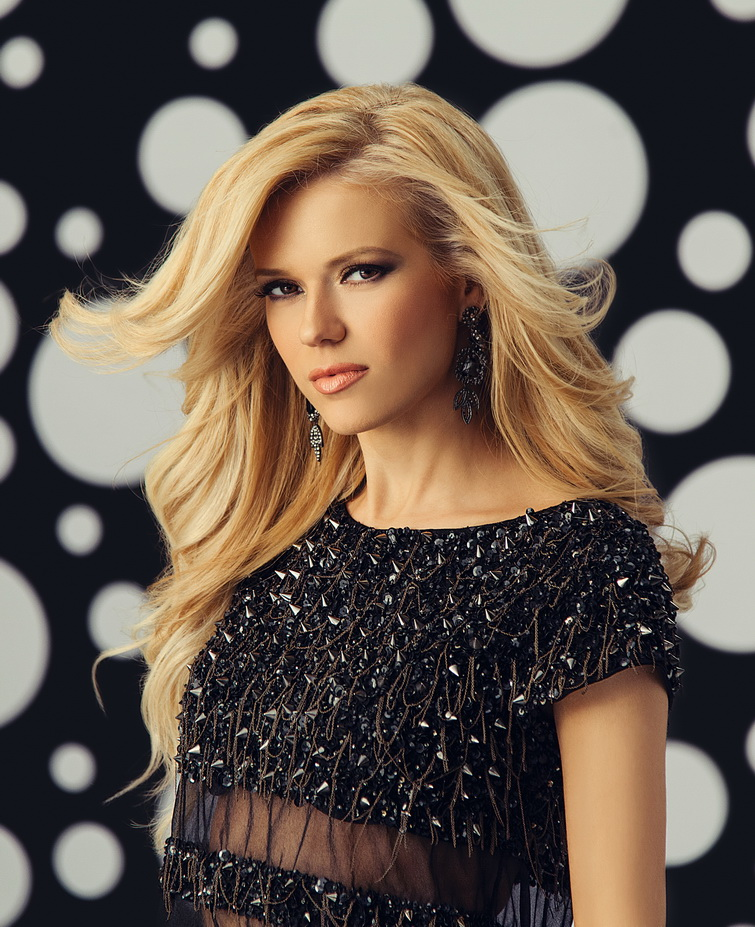

Background information
- Born: Nelly Petkova; 5 December 1983 (age 42); Karlovo, Bulgaria
- Genres: Pop, Bulgarian traditional
- Occupations: Singer, songwriter, producer
- Instrument: Vocals
- Years active: 2004–present
- Label: Nelly Petkova
- Formerly of: Ku-Ku Band
- Website: www.nellypetkova.com

Nelly Petkova (Bulgarian: Нели Петкова) is a Bulgarian singer, and an ex-vocalist of "Ku-Ku Band".

== Biography ==
Nelly Petkova was born in Karlovo, Bulgaria. Since her early childhood she has been focused on her development as a singer. Petkova studied Folk Arts her entire academic career culminating in her graduation from Sofia University with a major in Folk Singing. Her passion for Folk singing has led her to incorporate her unique vocal style into her pop songs.

== Music career ==
In 2004, she made her debut on Bulgarian National Radio where, with the radio folk orchestra, she recorded four songs. At the end of that year Petkova won the competition to become the lead vocalist for the number one rated show in Bulgaria, Slavi's Show and Ku Ku Band. There followed a number of appearances, including over 1300 live shows on national television (bTV), more than 100 concerts in Bulgaria and abroad, 3 national tours: “National Tour” (2005), “We Go On” (2007) and “No Mercy” (2009), a tour in the US and Canada “American Tour” (2010). With Ku Ku Band she recorded 3 studio albums – We Go On (2007), No Mercy (2009) and Macedonia (2010).

Petkova's voice and presence has gained the attention of global music and show business. Michael Bolton said Petkova's voice was “great and exceptional” and her performance – “phenomenal”. Petkova has sung on stage with Boney M, Cypress Hill, Army Of Lovers, Scorpions, Snap, Asia, Ishtar, Toto Cotugno, Nazareth, Manowar, Uriah Heep, Accept, Nick Mason from Pink Floyd, Mezzoforte, Ricchi e Poveri, Jon Anderson from Yes, Wil Salden of the Glenn Miller Orchestra, INXS, Elena Paparizou, Anna Vissi, Tarkan and many others. Besides her music projects, Petkova was a presenter of Slavi's Show, Dancing Starsm and a musical reality show on bTV.

In 2010 she became the face of the anti-smoking campaign “I Do Not Want To Be At Fault”.

At the end of July 2011, Petkova announced she is embarking on a solo career. She also presented her first single and video “Lucky One” feat. Miro Gee. In just a month “Lucky One” moved to the top of The Voice TV Top 10 and reached Top 3 of the Bulgarian Official Airplay Chart. The song was also being broadcast on the Spanish CHR stations.

In 2012 Petkova released her second English single "Take The Night".

Petkova has been working on multiple projects including touring in Europe and North America between 2012 and 2016. She released her third English single "Bad" in January 2016, which was produced by Grammy Award-winning producer Mario J. McNulty. Petkova is set to release her EP in the late spring of 2016.
