= Internal Military Service =

Internal Military Service Wojskowa Służba Wewnętrzna
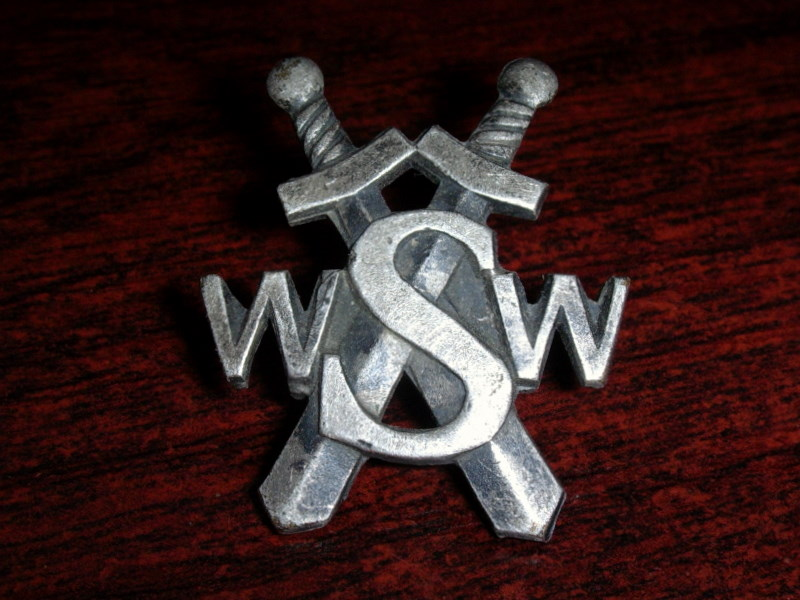
- WSW
- Abbreviation: WSW

Agency overview
- Formed: 1957
- Preceding agency: Main Information Directorate by Ministry of National Defense
- Dissolved: 1990

Jurisdictional structure
- National agency: pl
- Operations jurisdiction: pl
- General nature: Military police

Operational structure
- Agency executive: Aleksander Kokoszyn
- Parent agency: Ministry of National Defense

The Internal Military Service, (Polish: Wojskowa Służba Wewnętrzna, WSW) coll. Szefostwo, was an armed military counterintelligence, military police, and secret police within the structure of Ministry of National Defense or (MON). It served and protected the Polish Armed Forces against western and central MON institutions during the years of 1957–1990 in the Polish People's Republic or PRL.

== History of Polish counterintelligence after World War II ==
=== Background ===
Starting from mid 1944–1945 the Main Information Directorate carried out broad purges in the Polish forces by applying similar Stalinist methods, like false arrests, torture and show trials. With these actions, the Directorate was considered by some in Poland to be even more cruel than the Gestapo.

After 1956 and under the new political conditions in Poland, reforms were made and the Directorate was dissolved in January 1957 in a decree titled Order No. 0013 by the Deputy Minister of Defence Jerzy Bordziłowski.

== Creation of the Service ==
The Internal Military Service was established in order number 01/1957 by the Minister of National Defense, a position occupied then by General Marian Spychalski, a soldier active in Soviet circles, who rose to fame for his activities in Communist partisanship in Poland.

=== Responsibilities and supervision ===
The Service was responsible for typical military counterintelligence and military police duties, including:

- Detection and prevention of espionage, political or real sabotage, in all of the Polish forces, as well as munitions factories.
- Detection of illegal political movements within those forces.
- Protection of the Minister of National Defence and the closest family.
- Maintaining discipline in the Polish People's Army, including investigation and prosecution of Polish servicemen.
- Overseeing the recruitment of Polish People's Army.

The Military Internal Service was not accountable to the General Staff, which gave it a larger remit for its activities. Instead, it was directly accountable to the Ministry of National Defence, meaning it owed no loyalty to the forces it regulated.

=== WSW Chiefs ===
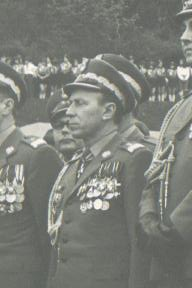
General Teodor Kufel as a chief of Military Internal Service, 1972.

Colonel Aleksander Kokoszyn, a Belarusian, pre-war communist and graduate of an NKVD school in Smolensk. During the war years he was working in the secret Polish Workers' Party paper and copy shop (Gwardzisty), where in 1942 he was arrested by Gestapo and sent to one of the concentration camps.

After the war he returned to Poland and began working together with his wife in the Main Information Directorate, where in December 1956 he became the head of that agency. He also took control of the Service upon its creation. During his time in charge, the Internal Service had lost the fear it struck into servicemen and was considered to have become much softer since the purges. Kokoszyn left his position in November 1964 and was replaced by his former deputy General Teodor Kufel.

From the beginning of his career he acted in service to the Soviet state. During the war he helped incite and organise the Warsaw Uprising. Then after the war he was working in the Polish gendarmerie, and from 1953 for the Ministry of Public Security. Between 1954 and 1955 Kufel attended KGB school in Moscow and after his return started working in the Polish gendarmerie's headquarter in Warsaw. Three years later, Kufel was moved to the Internal Military Service, as a Deputy Head of Directorate 1, and in 1964 he became overall Chief of the Service and held this post for 14 years until 1979 when General Czesław Kiszczak become succeeded him.

Czesław Kiszczak was a long time counterintelligence officer, first working in the Main Information Directorate before transferring to becoming head of counterintelligence of one of the Polish forces' infantry divisions and then one of the Military District and later head of counterintelligence for the Polish Navy. In 1967 Kiszczak become Kufel's deputy. But three years later he became the head of military intelligence which was then Zarząd II Sztabu Generalnego Wojska Polskiego (2nd Directorate of General Staff of the Polish Army). After seven years as its head, in 1979 Kiszczak come back to WSW to take over after Kufel. Again he was moved in 1981, this time to the civilian branches of secret service, he became minister and took over the Ministry of Internal Affairs (Ministerstwo Spraw Wewnętrznych) or MSW; with this position Kiszczak had the notorious Służba Bezpieczeństwa (SB) under his control. After General Kiszczak left WSW he was replaced by General Edward Poradko.

Born in 1924 Poradko had almost the same military past as Kiszczak. After the war he joined the military counterintelligence and was working for a long time in the GZI. Then he was moved to military intelligence and took over the strategic intelligence. In 1981 after Kiszczak left the WSW he came back to take over as a head. The next and last head of WSW was General Edmund Buła.

There are speculations that gen. Edmund Buła had ordered to copy lists of WSW Informants and agents and sent it to Moscow, to KGB's Third Main Directorate, and some of them to GRU. Buła is also responsible for many other things. In the 1980s, the Military Internal Service was very much involved in the fight against the democratic opposition Solidarity, etc. Almost all of the operational documents from those years have been burned, (in 1988 11 tons and latter another 5) all of this actions were controlled by general Bula and supervised by Colonel Mieczysław Kacprzyk. But the order to destroy these documents, had to come from a higher level, it came from General's W. Jaruzelski and Czesław Kiszczak. From 1957 to 1990 the commanders of WSW were:

- Gen. Aleksander Kokoszyn - 01/10/1957 – 11/14/1964
- Gen. Teodor Kufel - (act) 11/14/1964 – 06/24/1965
- gen. Teodor Kufel - 06/24/1965–1979
- Gen. Czesław Kiszczak - 1979–1981
- Gen. Edward Poradko - 1981–1986
- Gen. Edmund Buła - 08/15/1986 – 08/1990

=== Mazur Commission and WSW activities ===
The WSW was much different from its predecessor. During the transition from the Military Information to Military Internal Service, a special commission was established, so-called Mazur Commission. Its task was to check the activities of former Military Information, and an indication of the officers who showed cruelty to detainees doing the investigations.
The results of the commission have been classified and have been hidden from the general public till 1999, when one of the major newspapers (Gazeta Wyborcza) had printed pieces of it.

=== Organization ===
During the beginning Internal Military Service was based on two main wings: first was operational counterintelligence, and second for investigation and safety tasks. The each wing were supervised by WSW Chef Deputies. Deatel WSW organization was:

- First Directorate - military counterintelligence responsible for counter-espionage protection of the army's structure and its units and important military infrastructure and installations. First Directorate consisted of four sections.

- 1st Section: protection of military secrets, confidentiality and prevention
- 2nd Section: Offensive counterintelligence, carrying out recruitment of secret informants in the ranks of Polish Army, Navy, and Air Force. Also conducting so-called operational counterintelligence games.
- 3rd Section: Elimination of political sabotage in military units.
- 4 Section: counterintelligence analysis.

- Second Directorate - Responsible for keeping an eye on order and discipline in the army units. Also the second main responsibility of 2nd Directorate was: Carrying out investigation cases, criminal, and the various offenses committed by soldiers of the armed forces. 2nd Directorate consisted of four Sections and one special section.
