= Anka Lambreva =

Bulgarian nurse and teacher

- Born: 22 February 1895; Karlovo, Bulgaria
- Died: 18 February 1976 (aged 80); Karlovo, Bulgaria
- Occupations: Nurse, teacher, adventurer

Anka Vassileva Lambreva (Bulgarian: Анка Василева Ламбрева) (22 February 1895 – 18 February 1976) was a Bulgarian nurse, teacher and adventurer. She became the first Bulgarian woman to fly across the English Channel and circumnavigate the world.

Anka was born in Karlovo, Bulgaria in a poor family of five children. Her father was unable to support her, however she managed to graduate a high school in Plovdiv while working as a maid. For a year and a half she studied medicine and worked as a clerk in an insurance company in Sofia to support herself, but both her parents dies and she was forced to move back to Karlovo and started a job as a teacher.

In 1922 Anka won a scholarship for the American College in Istanbul, where she studied nursing and interned at a local hospital. Over the next six years she worked at a hospital near the Bosphorus and saved the lives of several people, including a baby.

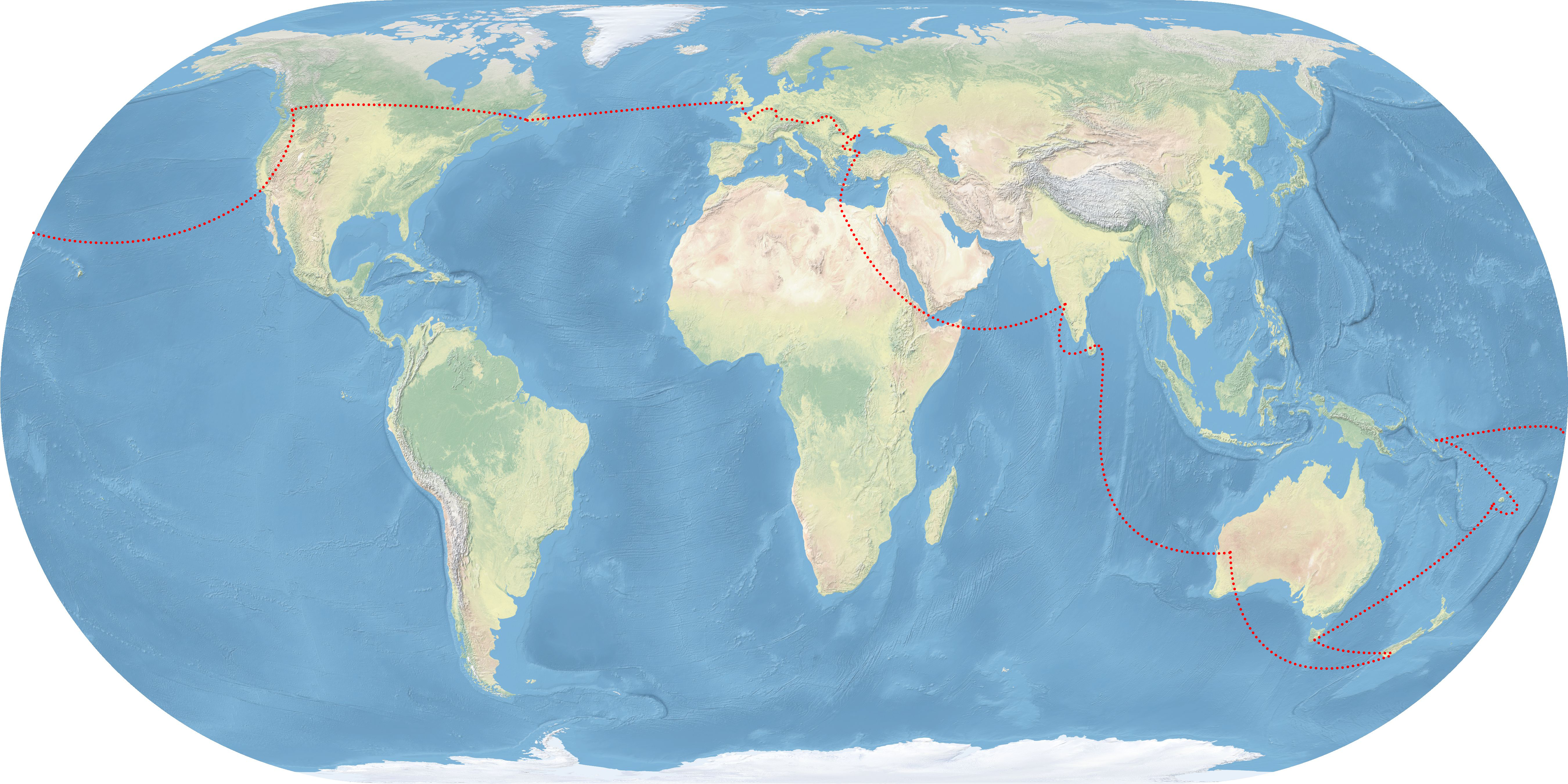
Anka Lambreva's first round the world trip

Her first round the world trip began in March 1928 when she left Istanbul and boarded a steamship to Dunedin, New Zealand where she also worked as a nurse. During the three-month journey Anka explored Egypt, India, Ceylon and Australia. In 1929 she left New Zealand and headed back to Bulgaria passing through Tasmania, Tahiti, Fiji, Samoa, Canada, United States, England, France and Germany.
