= Anka Krizmanić =

Croatian painter

- Born: November 2, 1896; Omilje, Croatia
- Died: November 2, 1987 (aged 91); Zagreb, Croatia
- Other name: Anka Krizmanic-Paulic
- Education: Tomislav Krizman
- Years active: 1910–1946
- Known for: painting, printmaking

Anka Krizmanić, also known as Anka Krizmanic-Paulic, (1896–1987) was a Croatian painter and printmaker, and later scientific illustrator. She was active between 1910 and 1946.

== About ==
She attended a private painting school at Krizman School of Painting in Zagreb, where she studied under Tomislav Krizman. From 1913 to 1917, she continued her education at Kunstgewerbeschule in Dresden, Germany. Afterward, she pursued further studies in Paris from 1920 to 1930. In 1921 and 1922, she worked on creating lithographic maps of Dubrovnik, while staying in that city. Her painting work had two major series, one of which was "dance" and was inspired by dancers Anna Pavlova, Grete Wiesenthal, and Gertrud Leistikow. The other series was "lovers".

In 1935, she met German painter Ludwig Weninger (1904–1945) and a romance started between them. By the beginning of World War II (c.1939), the relationship ended.

In 1946, she became a scientific illustrator for the School of Medicine in Zagreb, and she lessened her time painting.
