= Karlovo Peak =

Mountain in Antarctica

Location of Tangra Mountains on Livingston Island in the South Shetland Islands.

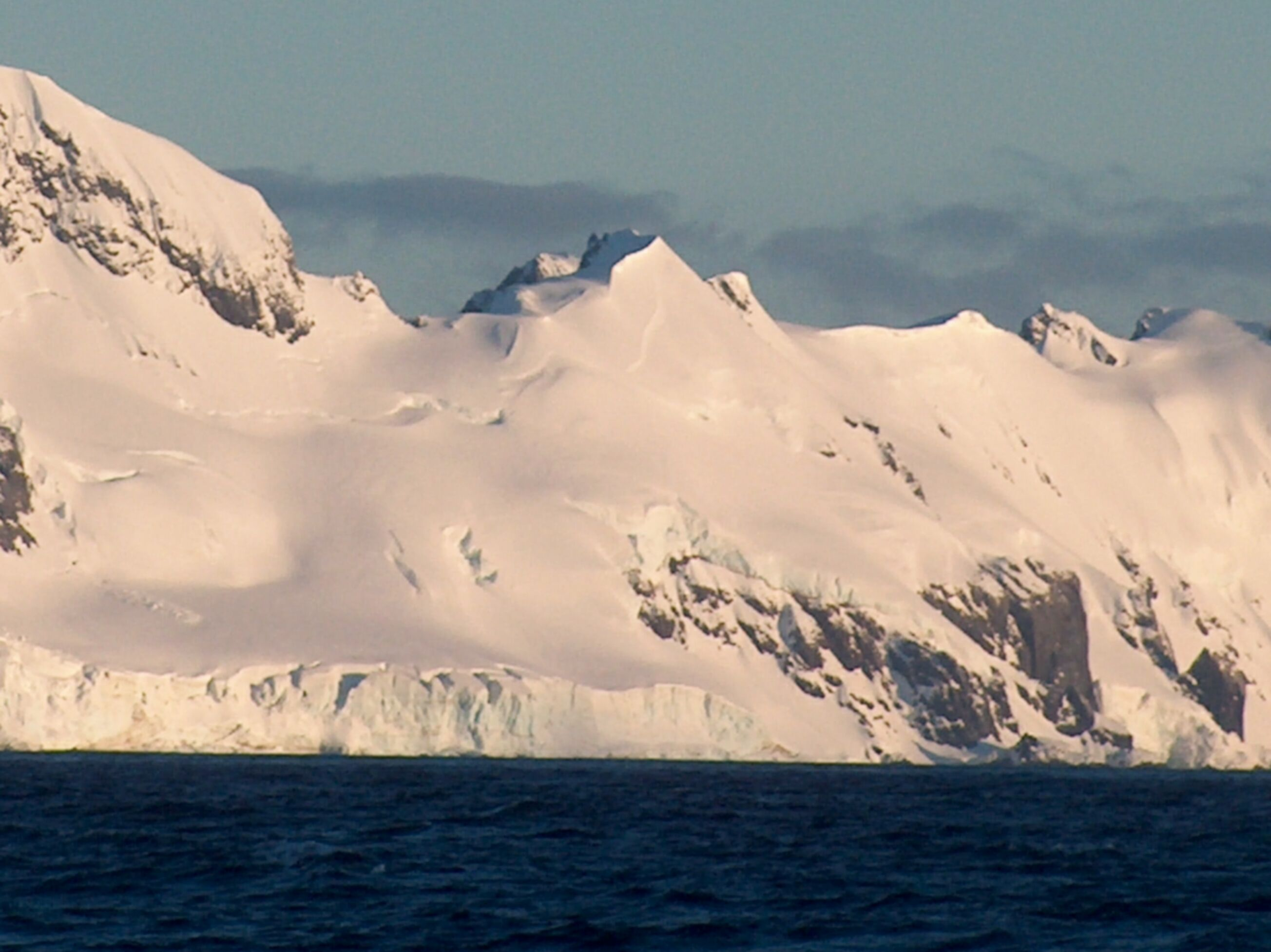
Karlovo Peak from Bransfield Strait.

Topographic map of Livingston Island, Greenwich, Robert, Snow and Smith Islands.

Karlovo Peak (Bulgarian: връх Карлово, romanized: vrah Karlovo, IPA: [ˈvrɤx ˈkarɫovo]) is a 300 m peak in Delchev Ridge, Tangra Mountains on eastern Livingston Island in the South Shetland Islands, Antarctica. It has partly ice-free north slopes, and precipitous south-eastern ones, and surmounts the east extremity of Sopot Ice Piedmont to the north.

The peak was named after the Bulgarian town of Karlovo.

== Location ==
The cliff is located at 62°37′04.2″S 59°49′24″W which is 610 m east-northeast of Mesta Peak, 280 m south-southwest of Malyovitsa Crag and 1.29 km southwest of Renier Point (Bulgarian mapping in 2005 and 2009).

== Maps ==
- L.L. Ivanov et al. Antarctica: Livingston Island and Greenwich Island, South Shetland Islands. Scale 1:100000 topographic map. Sofia: Antarctic Place-names Commission of Bulgaria, 2005.
- L.L. Ivanov. Antarctica: Livingston Island and Greenwich, Robert, Snow and Smith Islands. Scale 1:120000 topographic map. Troyan: Manfred Wörner Foundation, 2009.
