= Anka Čekanová =

Czech dancer and choreographer (1905–1965)

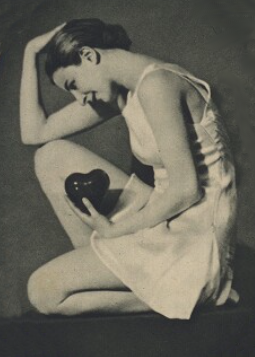
- Čekanová in 1927
- Born: Anna Marie Julie Čekanová; 26 February 1905; Prague, Bohemia, Austria-Hungary
- Died: 22 July 1965 (aged 60); Prague, Czechoslovakia
- Occupation(s): dancer, choreographer
- Spouse: Otakar Kukula
- Children: 2
- Career
- Former groups: Forest Theatre; Devětsil
- Parent(s): Václav Čekan (father); Anna Broft (mother)

Anna Marie Julie Čekanová, known professionally as Anka Čekanová and Anna Čekanová-Kukulová (26 February 1905 – 22 July 1965), was a Czech dancer and choreographer.

== Early life ==
Anna Marie Julie Čekanová was born on 26 February 1905 in her family home at 42 Charvátova Street in Prague, Bohemia, Austria-Hungary. Her father, Václav Čekan, owned a hat factory and her mother, Anna Broft, ran a motion studio. She had a twin brother named Václav.

== Career ==
In 1916 Čekanová's father founded the Forest Theatre in Řevnice. She danced and acted in several theatrical performances and became part of the Chekan Drama Company, which performed at the theatre. In 1924 she performed the role of Salome in Oscar Wilde's Salome with the original score by Jaroslav Křička.

She studied rhythmic gymnastics, expressionist dance, and Dalcroze eurhythmics with Alice Dubská, Helena Vojáčková, Volková, Vratislav, Leben-Vaňková, Kupferová, and Siblík. She made her professional debut as a soloist in 1926 at the Červená Sedma cabaret in Prague. Later that year she performed at the National Theatre. She danced accompanied with music by Franz Schubert, Bedřich Smetana, Jaroslav Ježek, and František Hilmar. She was a member of the Devetsil Art Association and founded her own dance company, collaborating with composers Jaroslav Křička and Otakar Ostrčil.

On 26 May 1930, she married Otakar Kukula and retired from her career as a solo artist. She continued to dance with the Forest Theatre ensemble, and was credited under her married name. She and her husband had two children.
