= Anka Đurović =

Serbian nurse in Turkish Wars

Anka Đurović (1850–1925) was a Serbian nurse in the first Serbian-Turkish War, the Bulgarian-Serbian War, the First Balkan War, the Second Balkan War, and World War I. She was awarded the highest medal for humanitarian work, the Florence Nightingale Medal on October 5, 1923.

== Biography ==
Anka Crvenčanin was born in 1850. She was in Belgrade when World War I broke out, and as all three of her sons had joined the army, she went to the Red Cross where she got some stretchers and material to dress wounds. This was the beginning of her selfless effort to help the soldiers fighting in the war. She established battalion field dressing centers, something that had not existed before. This did not escape the attention of Field Marshal Stepa Stepanović, who commended her on her initiative. Although already middle-aged, she worked tirelessly to help the wounded soldiers and organize their transport to places where they might be given medical help. Following the movements of the Serbian army, she worked in the hospitals in Valjevo, Požarevac, Skoplje, and in the fall of 1915, she retreated with the army, through Kosovo and Montenegro, to Lezhë in Albania. With her people and her army, the wounded and the sick, she shared good and bad. She was evacuated with civilians and the wounded to France but in 1917 she returned as a volunteer nurse to work in the newly-established hospital of Crown Prince Alexander in Thessaloniki. In 1923, the International Red Cross Committee decided to award Đurović with the greatest honor, the Florence Nightingale Medal. She died in Belgrade in 1925.
