= Kostadin Georgiev =

Bulgarian footballer

Personal information
- Full name: Kostadin Toshkov Georgiev
- Date of birth: 24 March 1986 (age 40)
- Place of birth: Burgas, Bulgaria
- Height: 1.83 m (6 ft 0 in)
- Position: Goalkeeper

Senior career*
Years	Team	Apps	(Gls)
2003–2004	Chernomorets Burgas	5	(0)
2005–2006	Belasitsa Petrich	8	(0)
2006–2007	Chernomorets Burgas Sofia	6	(0)
2007–2008	Naftex Burgas		
2008–2009	Rayo Vallecano B		
2009	Akademik Sofia		
2010	Spartak Varna	4	(0)
2014	Neftochimic 1986 Burgas	16	(0)
2015	PFC Burgas	5	(0)
2015	Neftochimic 1962 Burgas	0	(0)
- * Club domestic league appearances and goals as of 1 January 2016

Kostadin Toshkov Georgiev (Bulgarian: Костадин Тошков Георгиев; born 24 March 1986, in Burgas) is a Bulgarian footballer who plays as a goalkeeper.

== Career ==
On 30 January 2014, Georgiev signed with Neftochimic Burgas as a free agent.
