= Kursum Mosque, Kastoria =

Historical mosque in Kastoria, Greece

Kursum Mosque
- Greek: Κουρσούμ Τζαμί
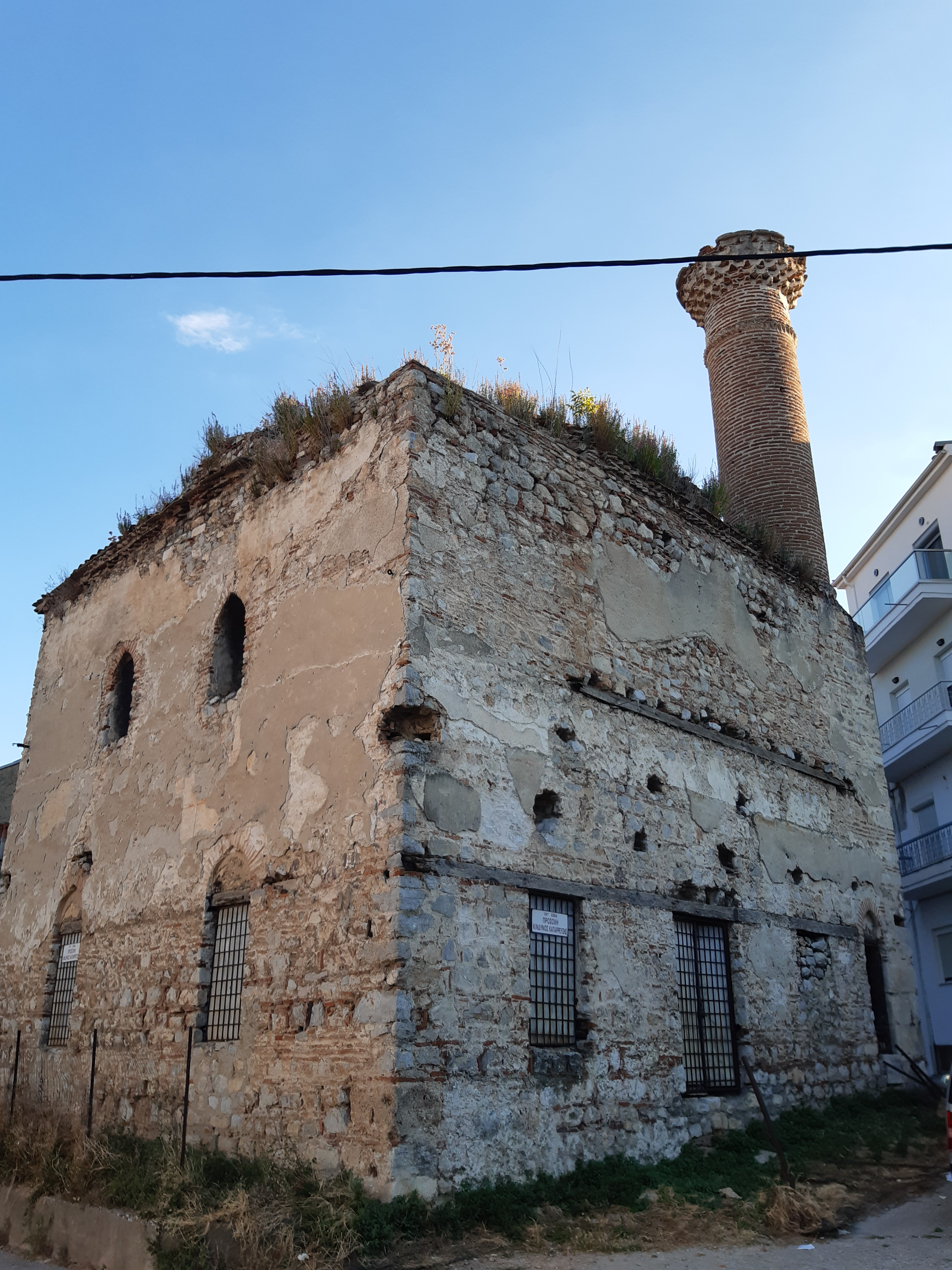
- Kursum Mosque in 2020 before restoration works

- Location within Greece

Religion
- Affiliation: Islam (former)
- Region: Western Macedonia
- Ecclesiastical or organisational status: Mosque (former)
- Status: Closed

Location
- Municipality: Kastoria
- Country: Greece
- Coordinates: 40°31′13.3″N 21°15′55.3″E

Architecture
- Style: Ottoman
- Completed: 15th or 16th century

Specifications
- Dome: 1
- Minaret: 1 (half remaining)

The Kursum Mosque (Greek: Κουρσούμ Τζαμί, from Turkish: Kurşunlu Camii) is a historical Ottoman-era mosque in the town of Kastoria, Western Macedonia, Greece. The mosque is located close to the old centre of town, on Mitropoleos Street. Like most mosques in Greece, it has not been operational since the 1920s, and lay in a poor state of preservation for decades before renovation works in the mid 2020s.

== History ==
=== Construction ===
Kursum Mosque, named for its lead roof, was the most prominent mosque of Kastoria. The dating for its construction following the Ottoman conquest is either the fifteenth or sixteenth century. Tsamisis and Moutsopoulos wrote it was built on the site of a previous Byzantine church, which in turn was erected on the site of an ancient pagan temple. A turbe or burial monument located within Kursum Mosque's courtyard had four brick walls and arches enclosed by a dome. Under the Ottomans, the mosque functioned as a place of worship for several centuries until Kastoria was annexed by Greece. The last imam sold the mosque prior to the departure of the town's Muslim population.

=== In Greece ===
In 1925 the mosque was declared a preserved monument by Greece. Kastoria municipality attempted in 1935 to get a permit and demolish the mosque for aesthetic reasons. The move was opposed by the local curator and the Ministry of Education, and instead only the mosque portico and nearby turbe was demolished. Unlike several other Ottoman mosques in Kastoria, Kursum mosque was spared destruction due to continuous use. Under Greece, the mosque was initially used as a library, later a museum and its most recent use as an antiquities warehouse, closed to the public.

In the mid 2010s, interest in the mosque was revived when several students from the Polytechnic School of the Aristotle University of Thessaloniki selected the mosque for their postgraduate studies. Their work, part of the interdepartmental postgraduate program "Protection, maintenance and restoration of cultural monuments", a government initiative, documented the mosque's history and gave suggestions for future uses. The students presence was controversial, as part of the Kastoria municipal council opposed funding their accommodation. Reasons given were a Muslim community was absent in modern Kastoria and opposition toward mosque restorations in Greece while there were discussions in Turkey over converting the Hagia Sophia into a mosque. (Note: Hagia Sophia was converted into a mosque in 2020, several years after the controversy.) These efforts led to the Kastoria antiquity authority, in cooperation with the Greek Culture Ministry to set aside funds for further study toward restoration and maintenance works.

Later, one million euros were allocated from the Recovery and Resilience Fund toward restoring the mosque. In September 2022 work began by removing soil in and around the mosque and strengthening the building's foundation. During the excavation, the foundations of an older medieval Byzantine basilica and 25 medieval burials containing 47 individuals were uncovered. Other artifacts uncovered were copper coins, metal buttons, glass and clothing fragments. Although yet undetermined, Tsamisis and Orlando said the basilica could have been dedicated to either Panagia (Mary, mother of Jesus) or Saint Paraskevi. The three aisled basilica was converted into a cemetery in the thirteenth century. After the fifteenth century Ottoman conquest, the mosque was built atop the basilica foundations and building material from the church was used for the new structure. The restoration works were completed in August 2026. A glass floor was added for the display of the archaeological finds; the mosque is now under Kastoria's jurisdiction for public use and cultural events.

== Architecture ==
Kursum Mosque is the only surviving mosque in Kastoria in a moderate state of preservation. Most of the external rendering on the walls had fallen off and the mosque had sustained some damage by the twentieth-first century. Left unattended over the years, the mosque was at risk of collapse. The mosque's dome used to be externally covered with plant overgrowth, and now only the lower half of the minaret remains. Internally, the building has good acoustic properties.

== See also ==
- Islam in Greece
- List of mosques in Greece
- List of former mosques in Greece
- Ottoman Greece

== Bibliography ==
- Tsamisis, Pantelis (1949). Η Καστοριά και τα μνημεία της [Kastoria and its monuments] (in Greek). Τύποις Ι. Λ. Αλευρόπουλος.
- Moutsopoulos, Nikolaos (1973). Καστοριά. Ιστορία – Μνημεία – Λαογραφία [Kastoria: History-Monuments-Folklore] (in Greek). ΕΕΠΣΑΠΘ.
