= Kurshum Mosque =

Mosque in Karlovo, Plovidv, Bulgaria

- Куршум джамия
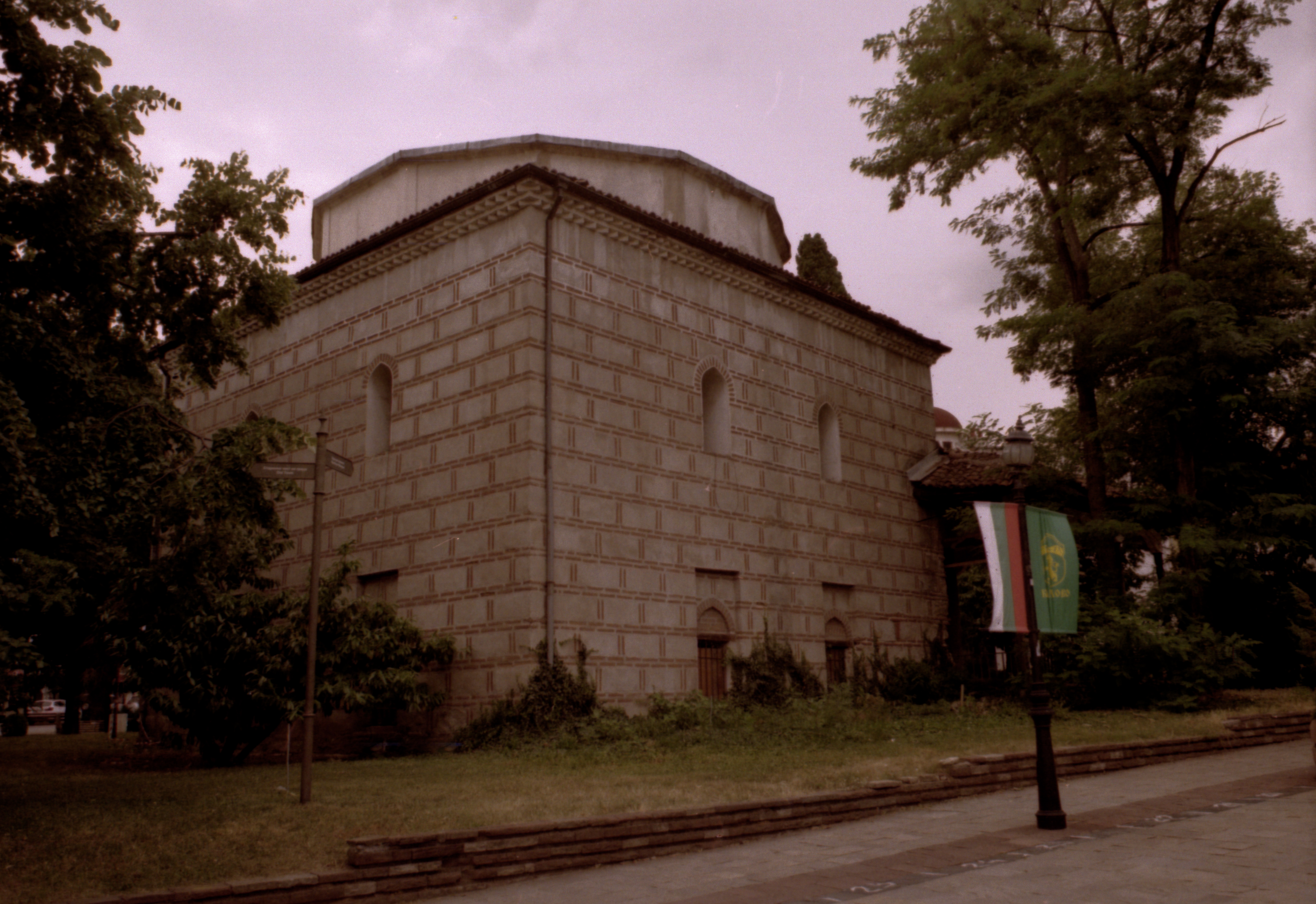

- Location within Bulgaria

Religion
- Affiliation: Islam

Location
- Location: Karlovo, Plovdiv Province
- Country: Bulgaria
- Interactive map of Kurshum Mosque
- Coordinates: 42°38′32″N 24°48′28″E

Architecture
- Type: mosque
- Style: Ottoman
- Founder: Karlu Ali Bey
- Established: 1485

The Kurshum Mosque (Bulgarian: Куршум джамия; Turkish: Kurşunlu Cami), officially the Kurshum Djamia Mosque, is a mosque located in Karlovo, in the Plovdiv Province of Bulgaria. The Kurshum Mosque was built in 1485 by Karlu Ali Bey. It is the oldest architectural monument in Karlovo.

In 2014, the mosque was attacked by hundreds of nationalists, fascists, and soccer fans, who smashed the mosque's windows.

== See also ==
- Islam in Bulgaria
- List of mosques in Bulgaria
