= Anka Grupińska =

Polish dissident, journalist and writer (born 1956)

- Born: 1956 (age 69–70)

Anka Grupińska (born 1956) is a Polish dissident, journalist and writer. She co-founded the periodical Czas Kultury.

== Life ==
Grpinska was born in 1956. She attended the Adam Mickiewicz University in Poznań where she studied English literature. She was involved in dissident writing and she co-founded the underground periodical Czas Kultury.

Since 2006 she has been recording the history of the Jews in Poland. She conducts interviews that are recorded for a museum.

Following Poland's independence she was awarded the Order of Polish Rebirth by the president.
