= Lukov =

Lukov may refer to:

== Places ==
=== Czech Republic ===
- Lukov (Teplice District), a municipality and village in the Ústí nad Labem Region
- Lukov (Třebíč District), a municipality and village in the Vysočina Region
- Lukov (Zlín District), a municipality and village in the Zlín Region
  - Lukov Castle
- Lukov (Znojmo District), a market town in the South Moravian Region
- Lukov, a village and part of Úštěk in the Ústí nad Labem Region
- Lukov, a village and part of Vraný in the Central Bohemian Region

=== Slovakia ===
- Lukov (Bardejov District), a municipality and village in the Prešov Region

== Surname ==
- Lukov (surname)
