= Gukov =

Gukov (Russian: Гуков, Belarusian: Гукаў) is an East Slavic surname. Notable people with the surname include:

- Aleksandr Gukov (born 1972), Belarus swimmer
- Sergei Gukov (born 1977), Russian-American mathematical and theoretical physicist

== See also ==
- Gudkov
- Lukov (surname)
