= Rokytnice =

Rokytnice may refer to places in the Czech Republic:

- Rokytnice (Přerov District), a municipality and village in the Olomouc Region
- Rokytnice (Zlín District), a municipality and village in the Zlín Region
- Rokytnice, a village and part of Hrubá Skála in the Liberec Region
- Rokytnice, a town part of Vsetín in the Zlín Region
- Rokytnice nad Jizerou, a town in the Liberec Region
- Rokytnice nad Rokytnou, a market town in the Vysočina Region
- Rokytnice v Orlických horách, a town in the Hradec Králové Region
