= Lukova =

Lukova may refer to:

- Luková, a municipality and village in the Czech Republic
- Lukovë, a municipality and village in Albania
- Feminine form of the Bulgarian surname Lukov
