= Tran Gorge =

Gorge in Bulgaria

- Трънско ждрело

- Location within Bulgaria
- Floor elevation: 650 m (2,130 ft)
- Length: 2.8 kilometres (9,200 ft)

Geology
- Type: Gorge

Geography
- Location: Ruy, Bulgaria
- Coordinates: 42°51′41″N 22°39′0″E
- Interactive map of Tran Gorge

Tran Gorge (Bulgarian: Трънско ждрело, also known as Lomnitsa Gorge or the Gorge of the River Erma) is a canyon-like gorge along the river Erma in the easternmost part of the Ruy mountain range of western Bulgaria. Administratively, it is situated in Tran Municipality of Pernik Province, lying some 3 km north of the municipal center Tran and just south of the Bulgaria–Serbia border. Tran Gorge is among the 100 Tourist Sites of Bulgaria of the Bulgarian Tourist Union and is a popular tourist attraction.

== Geography ==
Tran Gorge takes its beginning southeast of the village of Lomnitsa at an altitude of 677 m and heads northeast. In 300 m it reaches its narrowest section, some 100 m long and 5 m wide, where the altitude is about 650 m. At the narrowest section, some 120 m deep and 150 m long, two rocks tower over both shores the river Erma, called Tsarkvishteto (the Church) and Zhilav Kamak (the Hardy Rock). Downstream the gorge widens and its slopes remain relatively steep. It ends southwest of the village of Bogoyna at an altitude of 630 m. The total length of the gorge is 2.8 km, with an average altitude of 650 m.

The river Erma has cut down about 120 m in the Upper Jurassic limestone foundations and the surrounding slopes are steep, at places vertical. Geologically, the gorge is cut in strong limestones with a complex and varied structure, formed about 200 million years ago in a sea basin. It is quite narrow at its base and the river forms karst channels and small waterfalls. Up to the middle section, the walls of the Tran Gorge are vertical, and their width does not exceed 10–15 m. It was formed over millions of years by an erosion process from the impact of the river, which little by little made its way through the rock.

== Nature ==
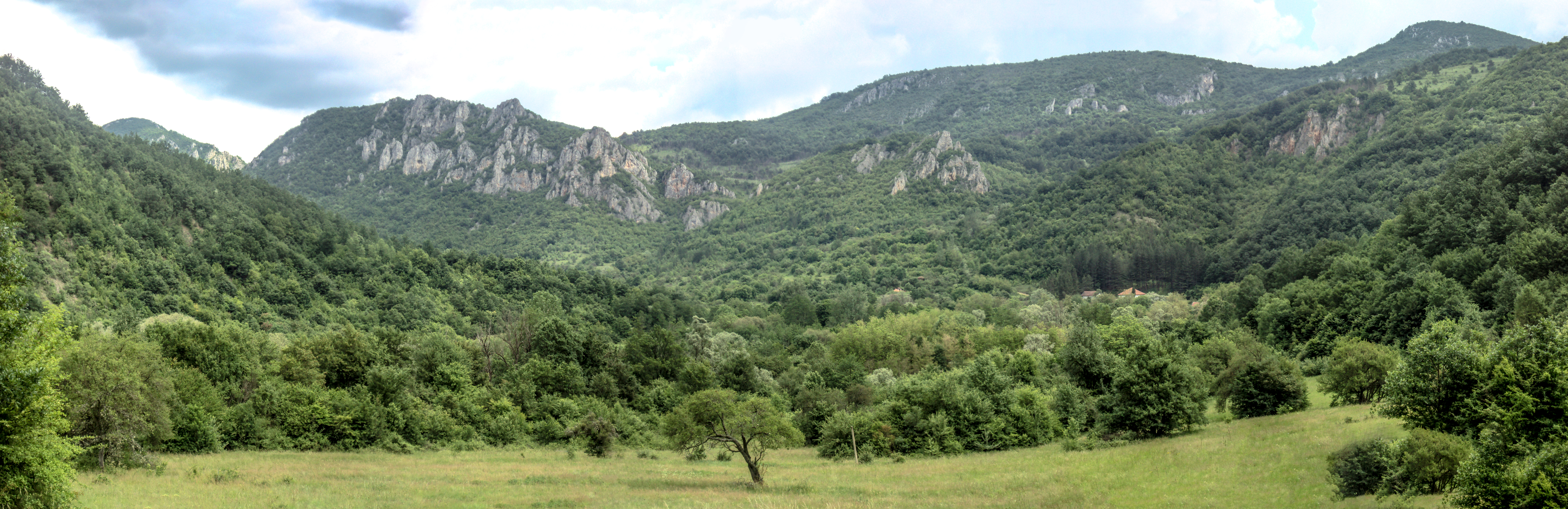
Panoramic view of the gorge

It was declared a natural landmark in 1961 under the name Gorge of the River Erma to “preserve its unique rock formations”. The gorge is situated in a forested area of the small Ruy mountain range, just north of the Znepole valley, and is home to diverse flora and fauna. The surrounding area contains numerous bird species, including European honey buzzard, common buzzard, Long-legged buzzard, Montagu's harrier, golden eagle, booted eagle, Eurasian sparrowhawk, saker falcon, common kestrel, Eurasian hobby, European bee-eater, Eurasian eagle-owl, white stork, corn crake, European nightjar, common kingfisher, European roller, Syrian woodpecker, middle spotted woodpecker, woodlark, barred warbler, red-backed shrike, ortolan bunting, etc.

The area of Ruy, including the gorge, is among the prime butterfly areas of Bulgaria, where several species of conservational importance are found, including Zerynthia polyxena, Parnassius apollo, Scolitantides orion, Glaucopsyche alexis, Kretania sephirus, Erebia medusa and Neptis sappho.

== Tourism ==
The gorge and its surroundings are picturesque and easily accessible from the capital Sofia via the second class II-63 road. The gorge lies about 3 km north of the town of Tran via a signed paved road. From the southern end of the gorge begins the 13 km-long Tran eco-trail; it takes about 8 hours to walk its entire length. Another starting point for the eco-trail is the village of Bankya, close to another natural landmark, the Yablanitsa Gorge. The trail contains a series of flat sections mostly along the river, but there are also many steep ascents and descents, bridges and stairs. There are alpine climbing routes on Tsarkvishteto and Zhilav Kamak rocks. A 200 m tunnel passes under Zhilav Kamak, excavated in the early XX century for a railway line between the towns of Tran and Tsaribrod, when the latter belonged to Bulgaria. There are trails leading to nearby villages, as well as to the summit of Ruy (1,706 m).

== Art and literature ==
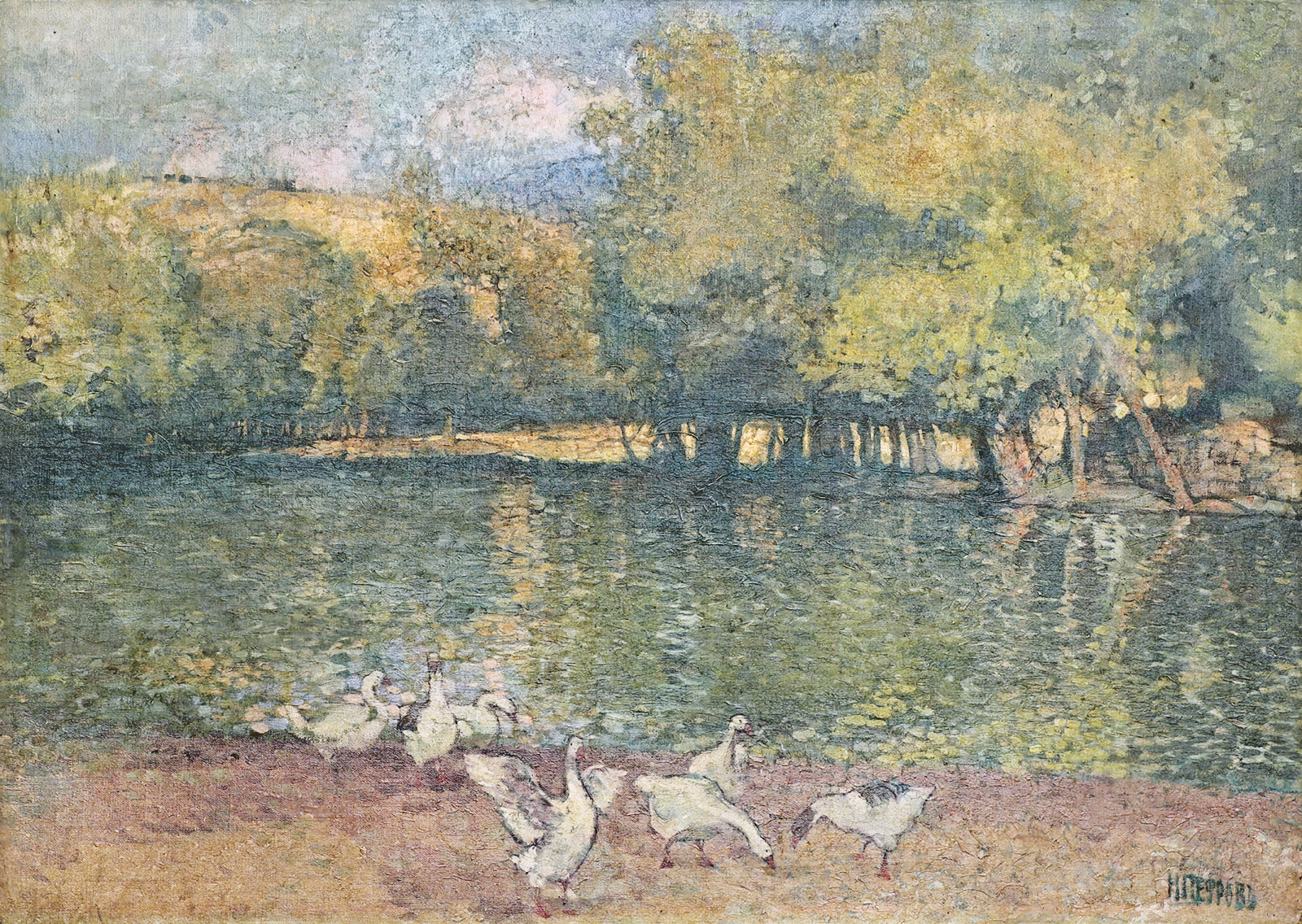
Erma River near Tran by Nikola Petrov

Tran Gorge and the Poganovo Gorge further downstream along the Erma, situated now in Serbia, but part of Bulgaria until the Western Outlands were lost to the Kingdom of Serbs, Croats and Slovenes after World War I, were vividly described in the travelog "What? Switzerland?" of the 19th century writer and initiator of the tourist movement in Bulgaria Aleko Konstantinov: "Do you see those jagged gray giant rocks glistening in the sun? They thus descend in parallel into the abyss where the river Erma flows. [...] At this moment, will someone sigh for Tyrol and Switzerland, that I would stain his mouth! [...] Now how can I describe those colossal gates, formed by the multi-colored rocks, on which my gaze is fixed?"

The surroundings of the gorge are depicted in the 1913 painting Erma River near Tran of the Bulgarian landscape painter Nikola Petrov, kept in the National Art Gallery, which is considered to recall the works of Edgar Degas and Georges Seurat.

== Gallery ==
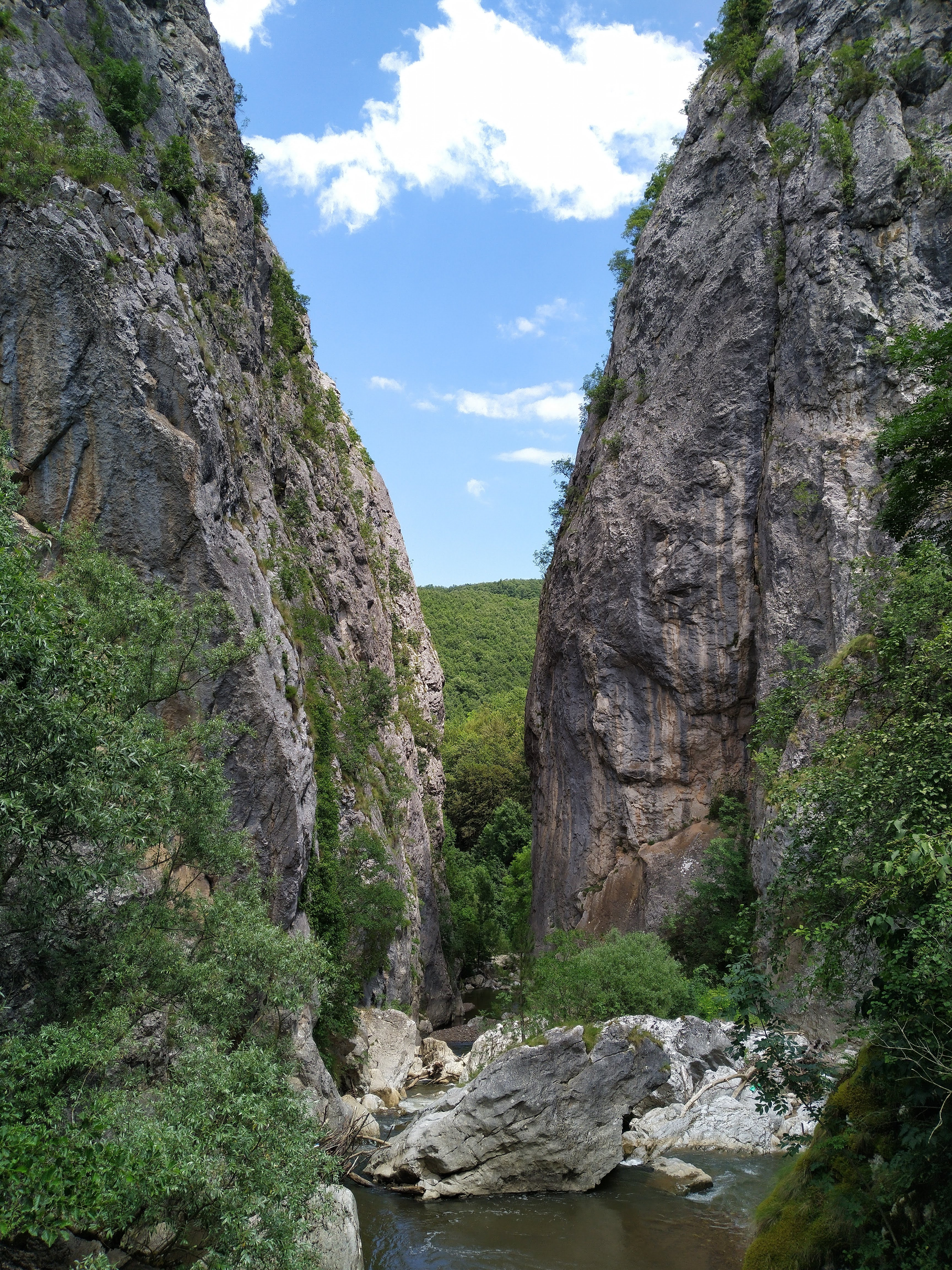

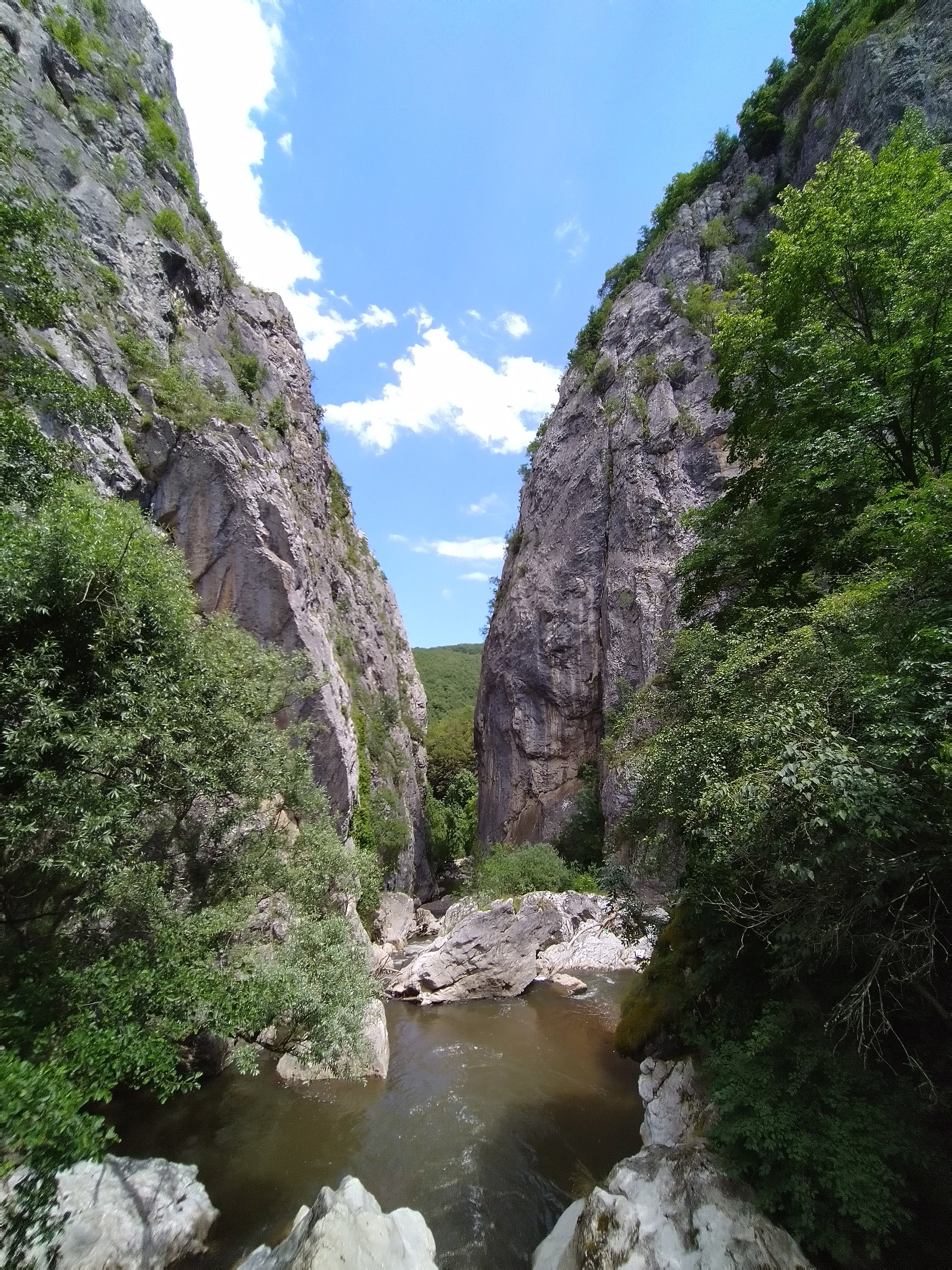

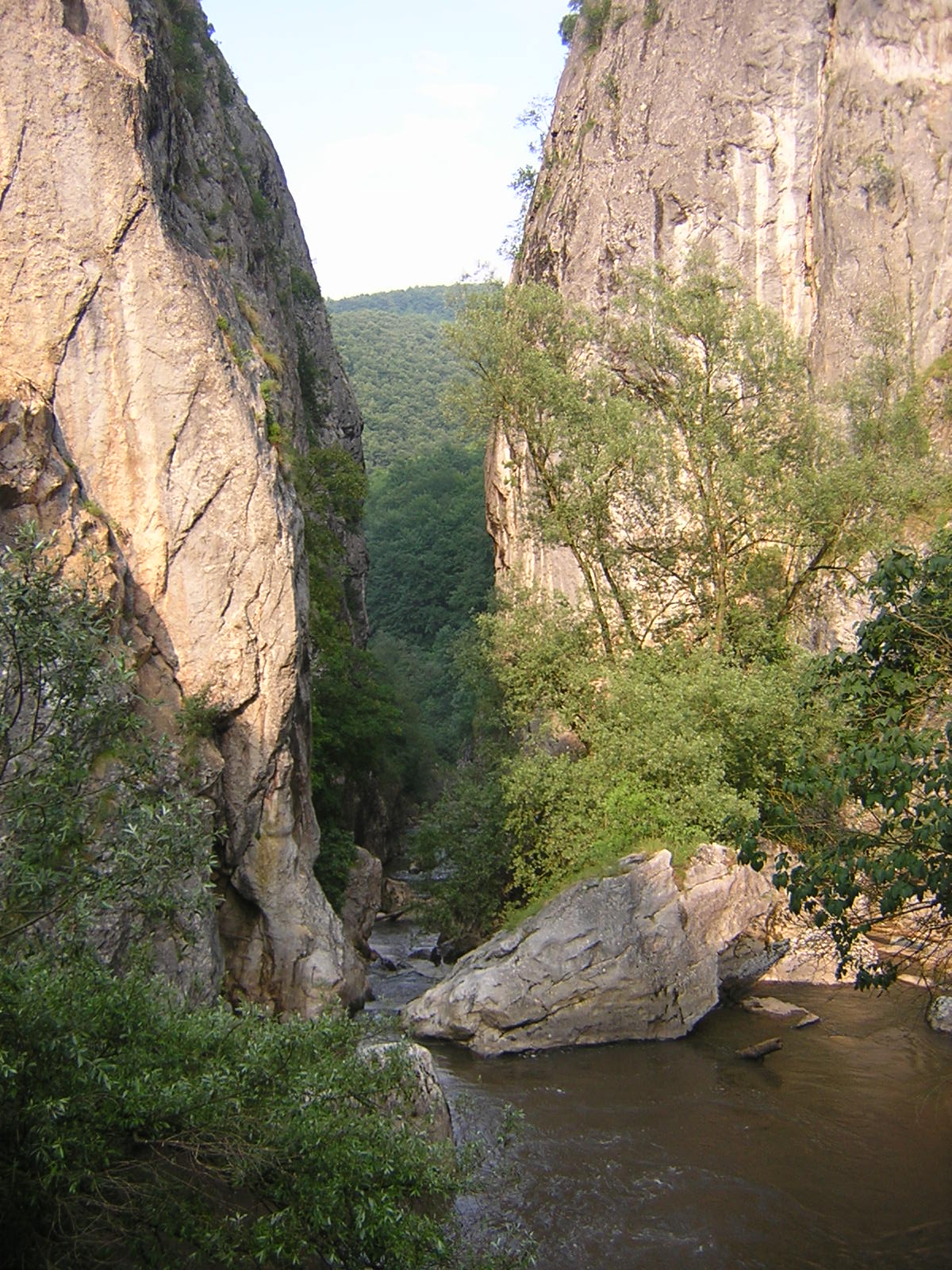

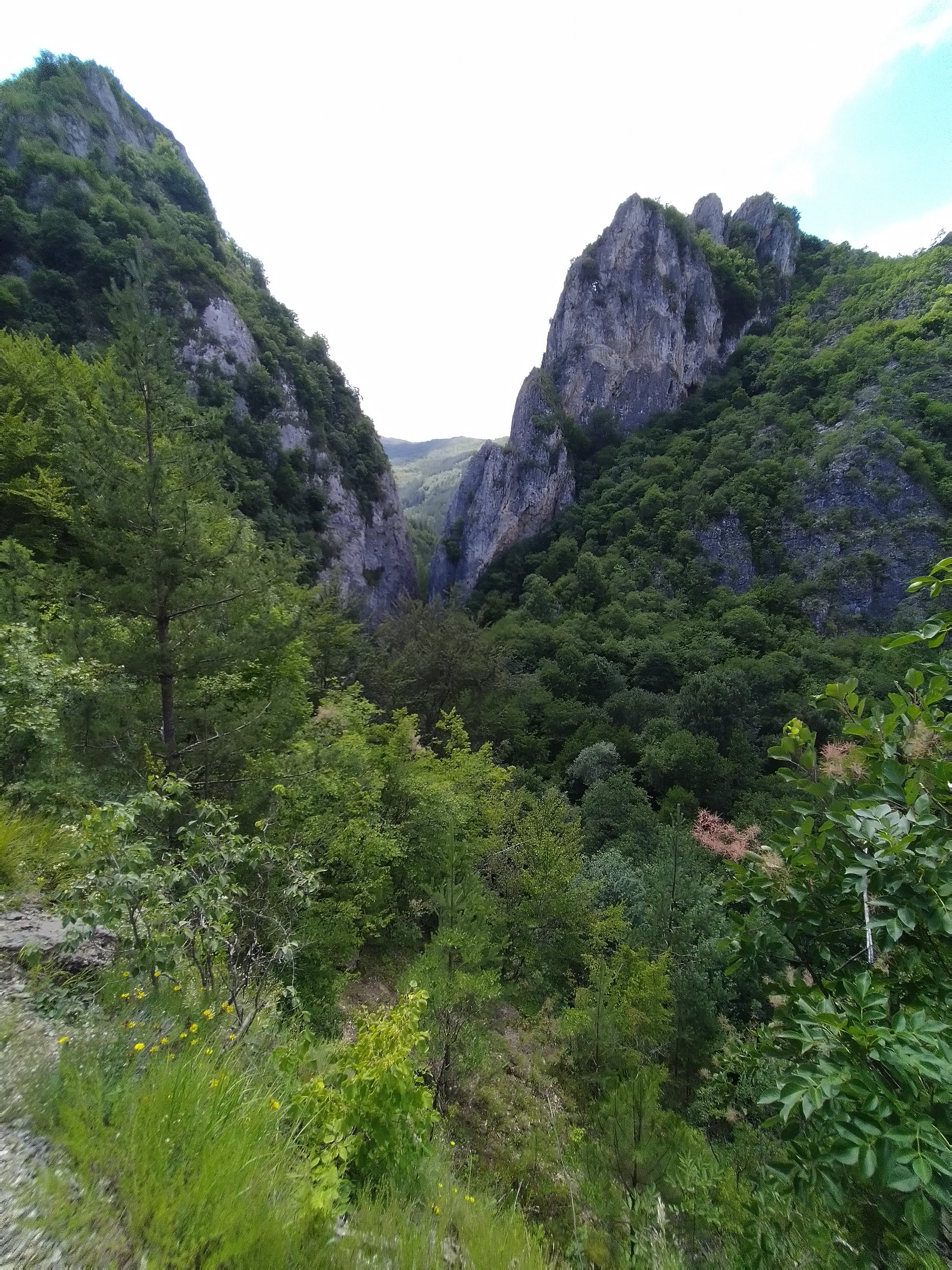
