= Erma River near Tran =

1910 painting by Nikola Petrov

- Река Ерма край Трън (Bulgarian)
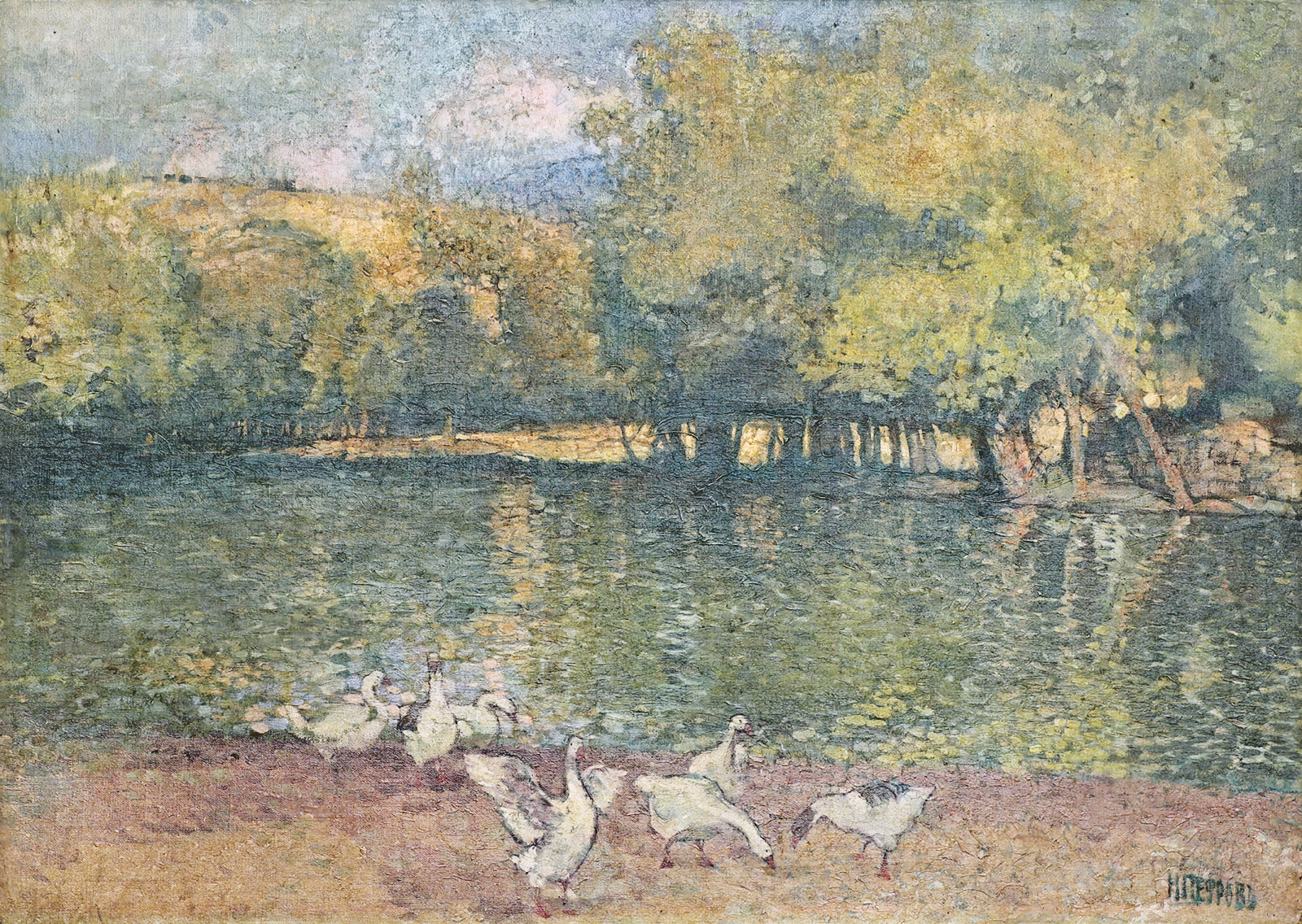
- Artist: Nikola Petrov (1881-1916)
- Year: 1910
- Medium: Oil on canvas
- Dimensions: 68 cm × 96 cm (27 in × 38 in)
- Location: National Art Gallery (Bulgaria)

Erma River near Tran is a painting by the artist Nikola Petrov (1881–1916) from around 1910.

== Analysis ==
It represents a landscape of the Erma River Gorge near the town of Tran with a flock of geese are depicted in the foreground on the nearer shore, and trees in the background across the river.

== Description ==
The painting's dimensions are 68 x 96 centimeters. The painting was purchased in 1913 by the National Museum in Sofia. It then became part of the permanent collection of the National Art Gallery (Bulgaria).
