= Jan Bula =

Czech Roman Catholic priest

Blessed Jan Bula
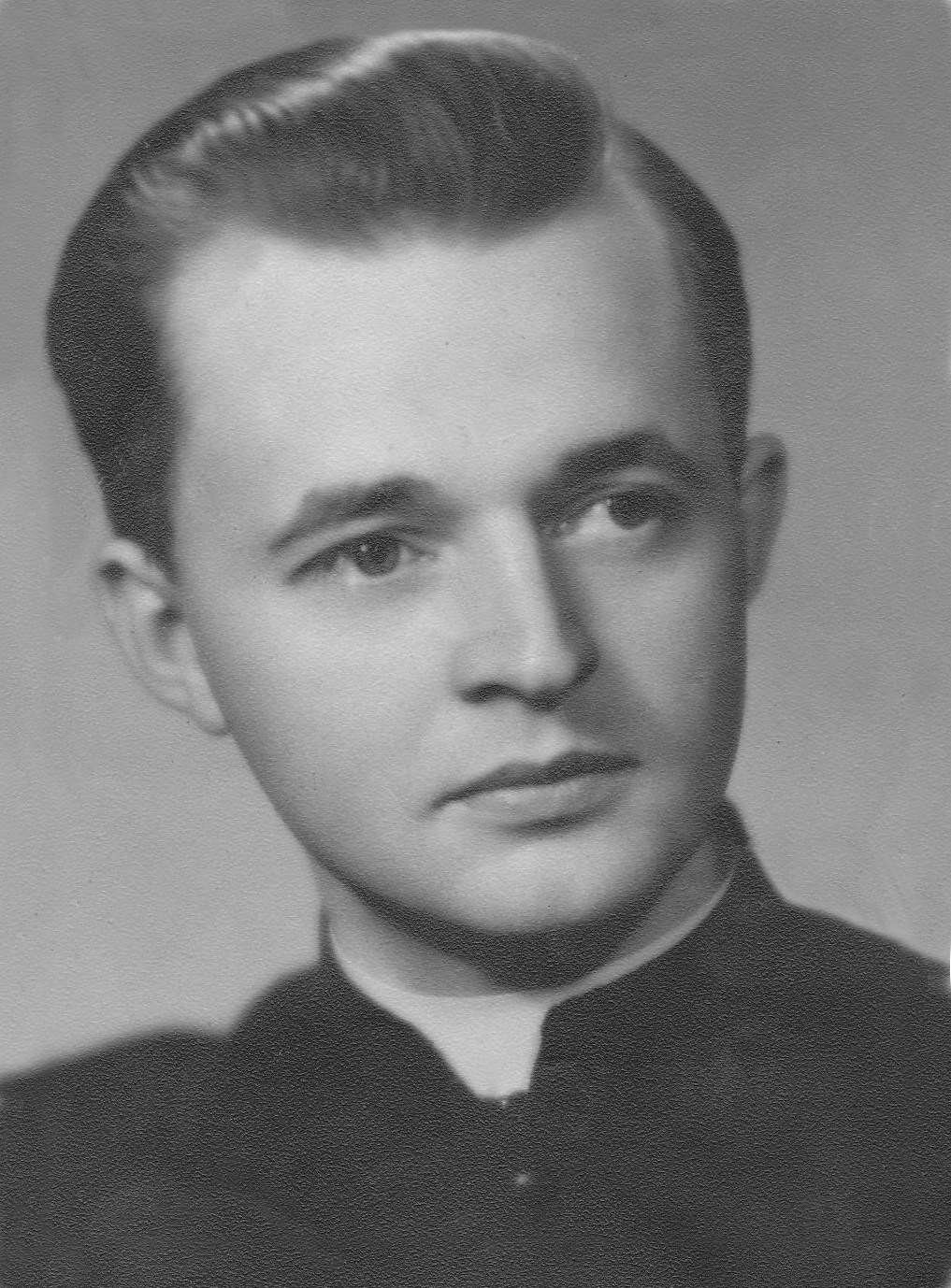
- Born: June 24, 1920; Lukov, Czechoslovakia
- Died: May 20, 1952 (aged 31); Jihlava, Czechoslovakia
- Resting place: Ďáblice Cemetery
- Beatified: June 6, 2026, Brno Exhibition Centre, Brno, Czech Republic
- Feast: June 17

Jan Bula (24 June 1920, Lukov – 20 May 1952, Jihlava) was a Czech Roman Catholic priest and administrator of the Rokytnice nad Rokytnou parish. He was one of the victims of the judicial murders committed by the communist regime as part of the Babice case. The Catholic Church venerates him as a blessed martyr and will commemorate him together with Václav Drbola every year on June 17.

== Biography ==
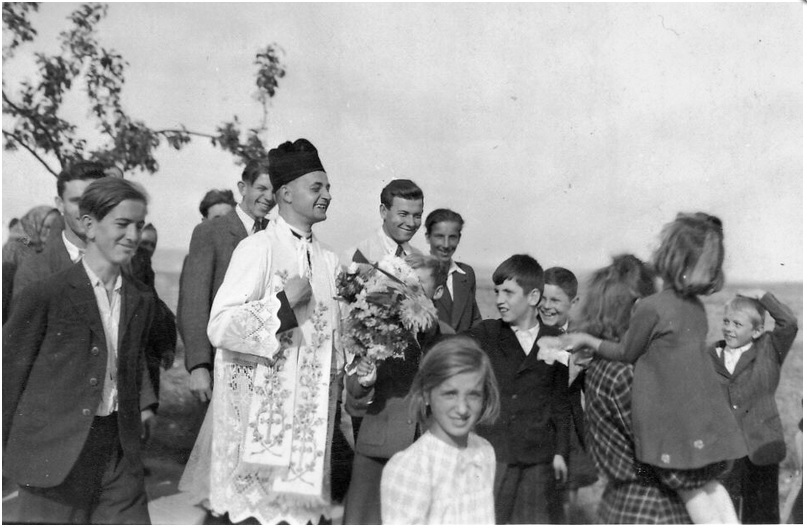
Bula with children

Jan Bula was born into a railway family. He studied theology in Brno. On July 29, 1945, he received priestly ordination. He served as a chaplain in Rokytnice nad Rokytnou. In 1949, he became the administrator of the Rokytnice nad Rokytnou parish. In the places where he served, he was well-liked, and young people in particular sought him out.

In February 1951, he was contacted by Ladislav Malý, a former classmate from grammar school. Malý claimed to Bula that he had abducted Prague Archbishop Josef Beran from internment and wanted to smuggle him across the border. He also claimed that the archbishop wished to go to confession before crossing the border. Shortly thereafter, Father Bula was warned by Father Jan Podveský, the parish priest from Jaroměřice nad Rokytnou, against cooperating with Malý, due to suspicion that Malý was an agent provocateur controlled by the State Security (StB). On April 28, 1951, he told Malý that he would not cooperate with him, and two days later he was arrested.

On July 2, 1951, Ladislav Malý organized an attack on a meeting of the Municipal National Committee (MNV) in Babice, during which three officials were shot dead. Father Bula, who had already been in prison for two months at the time of this action, was fabricatedly linked to it and was sentenced to death in a show trial on November 15, 1951, in Třebíč. The entire judicial process was accompanied by a massive propaganda campaign.

While in custody, Jan Bula was tortured; during a visit to the prison, his mother observed very prominent blue veins on his hands. According to an officer's words, "the comrades had overdone it with him, he would have to appear in another trial." All his front teeth were knocked out, due to which he could not eat solid food. After his request for clemency was rejected, Jan Bula was hanged in Jihlava on May 20, 1952.

In 1990, he was posthumously rehabilitated. From 2004, his beatification was being prepared. The Old Catholic Church of the Czech Republic also commemorates him as a martyr.

In 2016, a detailed and comprehensive biography, Oběť případu Babice, Jan Bula 1920–1952 (The Victim of the Babice Case, Jan Bula 1920–1952), written by historian František Kolouch, was published in book form.

In 2019, the Institute for the Study of Totalitarian Regimes had a memorial plaque bearing Jan Bula's name placed on the rectory in Rokytnice nad Rokytnou. The plaques are part of the Last Address project.

== Beatification process ==
The Catholic Church initiated proceedings for his beatification. In January 2015, the envelopes containing materials for the beatification preparation were sealed in the Vatican. The next step in the beatification process of Jan Bula and Václav Drbola was the conclusion of the procedural phase within the Diocese of Brno, followed by the ceremonial sealing of all materials during a solemn Mass; the materials were then to be transported to the Vatican. From February onward, the beatification process has been underway, with a collection launched specifically to expedite the beatification of the given priests; theologians and other experts are to examine the data and events from the 11 years of the priests' work in the diocese. The final instance will be the College of Cardinals; the entire process is expected to take approximately five years.

In July 2017, the so-called Vatican phase of the proceedings ended, after which the Congregation for the Causes of Saints ruled that the diocese had prepared the materials correctly and that there existed a reputation for martyrdom. Subsequently, the positio was prepared. To expedite the work, collections were organized in the parishes where Bula had served.

On October 24, 2025, Pope Leo XIV signed the decree on Bula's martyrdom, after which nothing further stood in the way of his beatification, which subsequently took place on June 6, 2026, at the Brno Exhibition Centre. The ceremony was presided over, on behalf of Pope Leo XIV, by Cardinal Michael Czerny, Prefect of the Dicastery for Promoting Integral Human Development. Over 13,000 faithful attended the Mass.
