= Samara flag =

19th-century symbol

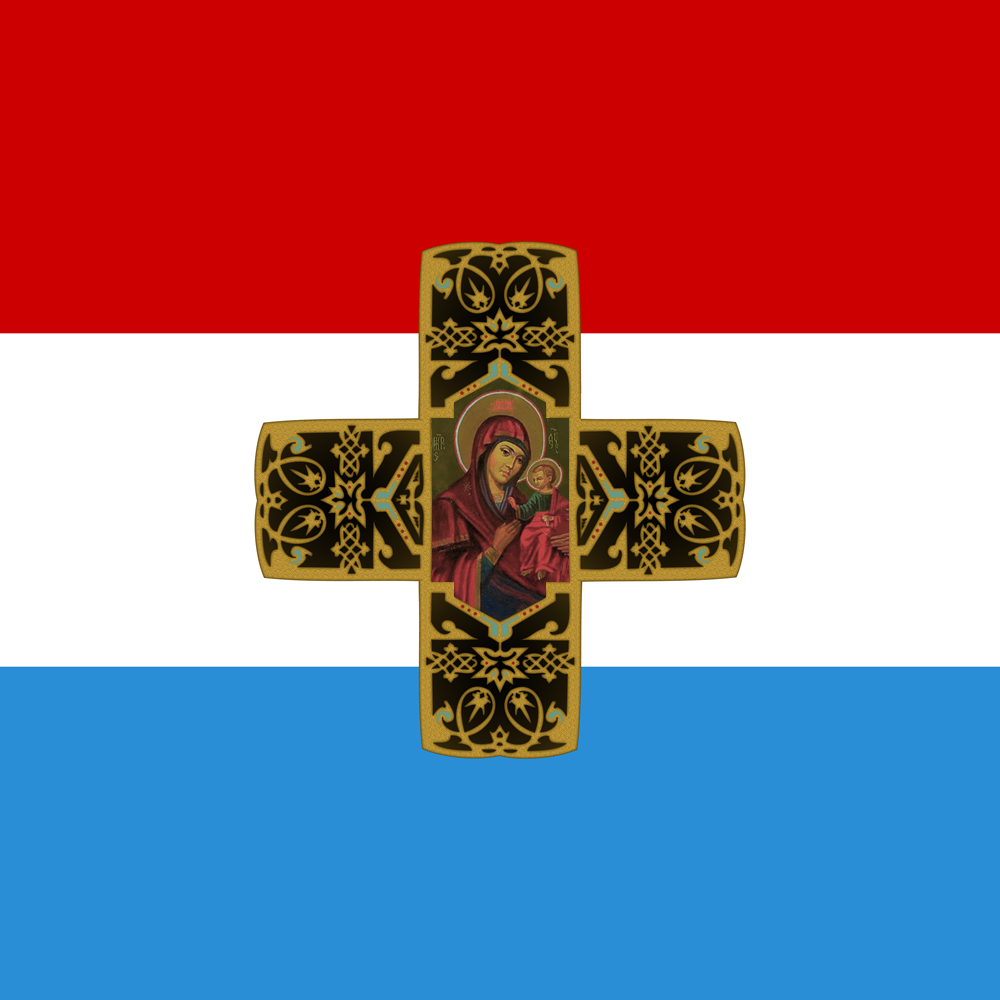
The Samara flag

The Samara Flag (Bulgarian: Самарско знаме, Samarsko zname, Russian: Самарское знамя, Samarskoye znamya) is a historical military symbol of the Bulgarian Army.

== History ==
The flag was woven by local nuns and given to the Bulgarian volunteers during the Russo-Turkish War of 1877–78 by inhabitants of the Russian city of Samara, on May 18th, 1877.

The flag became famous after it escaped capture by Ottoman forces at the Battle of Stara Zagora, where many Bulgarian soldiers died in order to prevent the flag from being captured by the Ottoman forces. Three ribbons are attached to the handle of the flag: a blue one with the inscription "Let God arise, and let His enemies be scattered", a red one with the inscription "Samara-Bulgarian people, 1876" and a white one.

The flag, originally intended for the rebels of the April Uprising of 1876, was handed to the Bulgarians near Ploieşti on 18 May, having been transported through Chişinău, where it arrived on May 1st. A delegation from the city of Samara, headed by Efim Kozhevnikov and Pyotr Alabin, handed the Samara flag to the volunteers in a special ceremony, with the flag being attached to its pole with gold nails. Tseko Petkov, a leader of a band in the Troyan part of the Balkan Mountains, exclaimed:

"May God let this holy flag pass from end to end through the long-suffering Bulgarian land. May our mothers, wives and sisters wipe their sorrowful eyes with it, and after it may durable peace come, and prosperity!"

The flag became famous during the Battle of Stara Zagora. The flag company came under frontal enemy fire. The standard-bearers, non-commissioned officer Anton Marchin, non-commissioned officer Avksentiy Tsimbalyuk and militiaman S. Minkov, died. Known in history is the feat of lieutenant colonel Pavel Kalitin, who with heroic efforts and the cost of his life managed to save the flag from Turkish captivity. It was taken from the battlefield after fierce hand-to-hand combat by the spontaneously formed Ensign Group - non-commissioned officer Toma Timofeev, militiaman Nikola Korchev, Pavel Malkia, D. Minkov, Popov, Radev, Mitsov, Donev, Nikola Krastev, the Ossetian Nikolay Karaev-Dudar and others.

It was also worn in the Battle of Shipka and the Battle of Sheinovo.

The Samara flag was initially kept in Radomir, the birthplace of its last bearer, Pavel Korchev. It was later kept in the royal palace in Sofia (now the National Art Gallery) from 1881. In 1946, the flag was transferred to the National Museum of Military History (NMMH). It has remained there ever since, preserved in a chamber under special conditions.

Two copies of the flag were made in 1958, one of which was sent to the Central Military Museum in Russia. Another two were subsequently created, one of which was made in the Mihail Maletski NMMH restoration workshop in 1978. The nuns of the Russian-founded Knyazhevo Nunnery of the Shroud of the Most Holy Mother of God created another precise replica in 2006.

== Design ==
The flag is a tricolor cloth (from top to bottom horizontally: red, white, blue) measuring 1.85 by 1.90 meters with gold crosses sewn in the middle. On one side of them is embroidered the image of the Mother of God of Iver, and on the other the images of the Holy Brothers Cyril and Methodius. The paintings were done by the St. Petersburg artist Nikolay Simakov, and the embroideries by the nuns of the Samara Monastery.

The spade of the flag is silver in the Byzantine style and was designed by Count Rochefort.

== Honours ==
The Samara flag is the only flag that has been awarded the Bulgarian Medal for Bravery, the medal being placed in its pole's decorated point. The flag has been portrayed numerous times by noted artists, including The Samara Flag by Jaroslav Věšín from 1911 and Handing of the Samara Flag to the Bulgarian Volunteer Corps in Ploieşti by Nikolay Dmitriev-Orenburgsky.

The Samara Flag Monument in Stara Zagora is a concrete replica of the Samara flag and commemorates the deaths of Bulgarian soldiers in the Russo-Turkısh War of 1877–78.

== Gallery ==
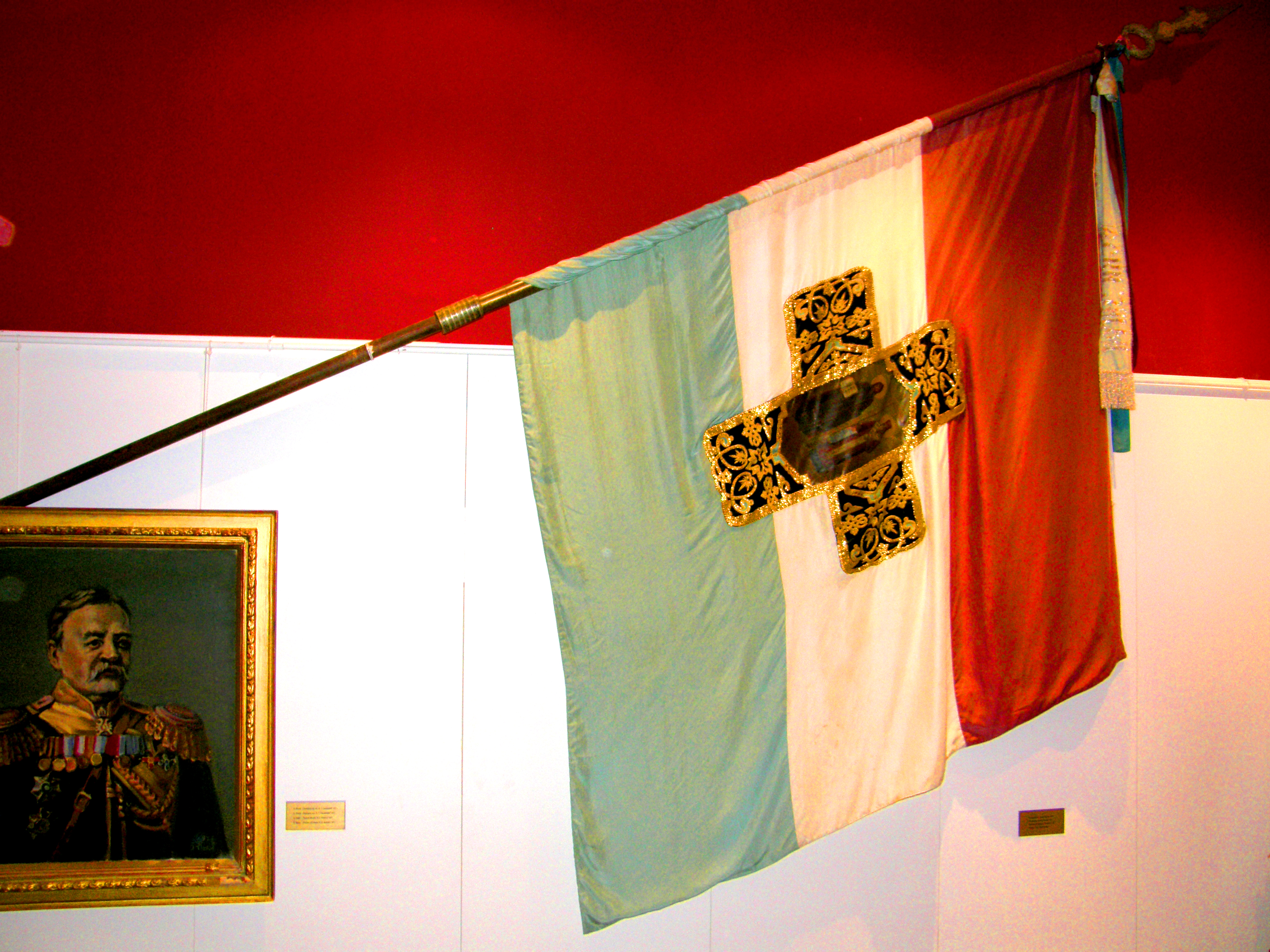
Authentic replica of the Samara flag in the Shipka Monument

Handing of the Samara Flag (Nikolay Dmitriev-Orenburgsky)

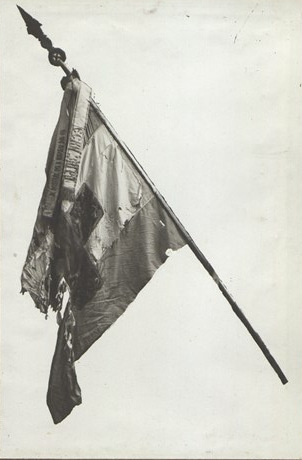

The Samara Flag (1911, Jaroslav Věšín)

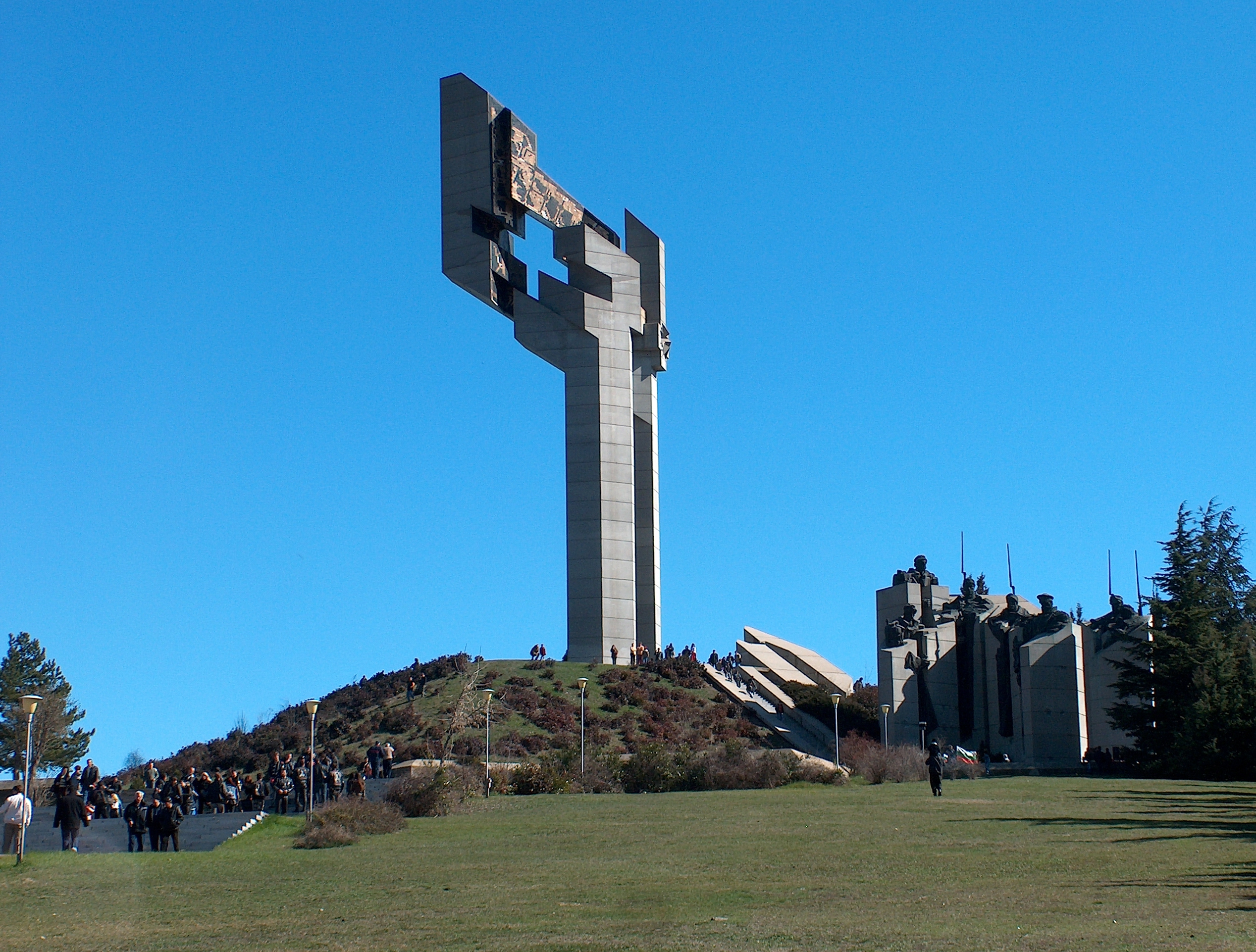
The monument Samarsko Zname
