= Bogoyna =

Village in Bulgaria

Coordinates: 42°52′22″N 22°39′38″E

Bogoyna is a village in Tran Municipality in Pernik Province, western Bulgaria. The village located next to the border with Serbia. It was divided by the Treaty of Neuilly-sur-Seine between Bulgaria and Serbia. The Serbian part of the village is called Petačinci.
