= Jaroslav Věšín =

Czech painter (1860–1915)

- Ярослав Вешин
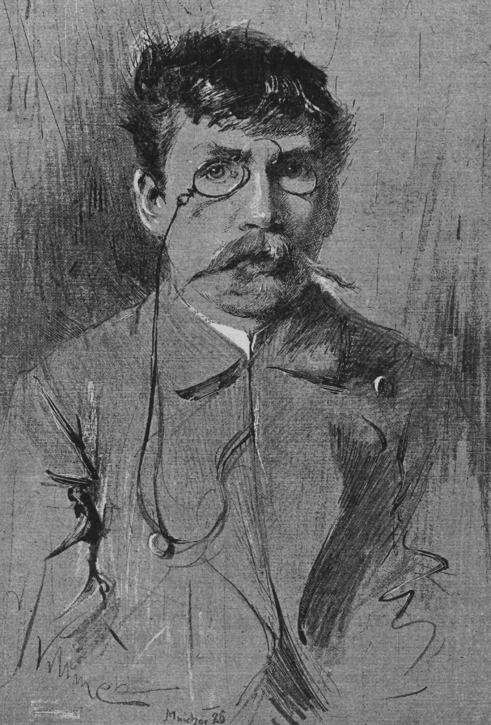
- Portrait by Jan Vilímek (1886)
- Born: 23 May 1860; Vraný, Austrian Empire
- Died: 9 May 1915 (aged 54)
- Education: Academy of Fine Arts in Prague, Academy of Fine Arts Munich

Jaroslav František Julius Věšín (Bulgarian: Ярослав Франтишек Юлиус Вешин, romanized: Yaroslav Frantishek Yulius Veshin; 23 May 1860 – 9 May 1915) was a Czech painter who mainly worked in Bulgaria and who was noted as a master of genre painting. The realistic depiction of battle scenes from the First Balkan War (1912) are the subject of a substantial part of his work.

== Life ==
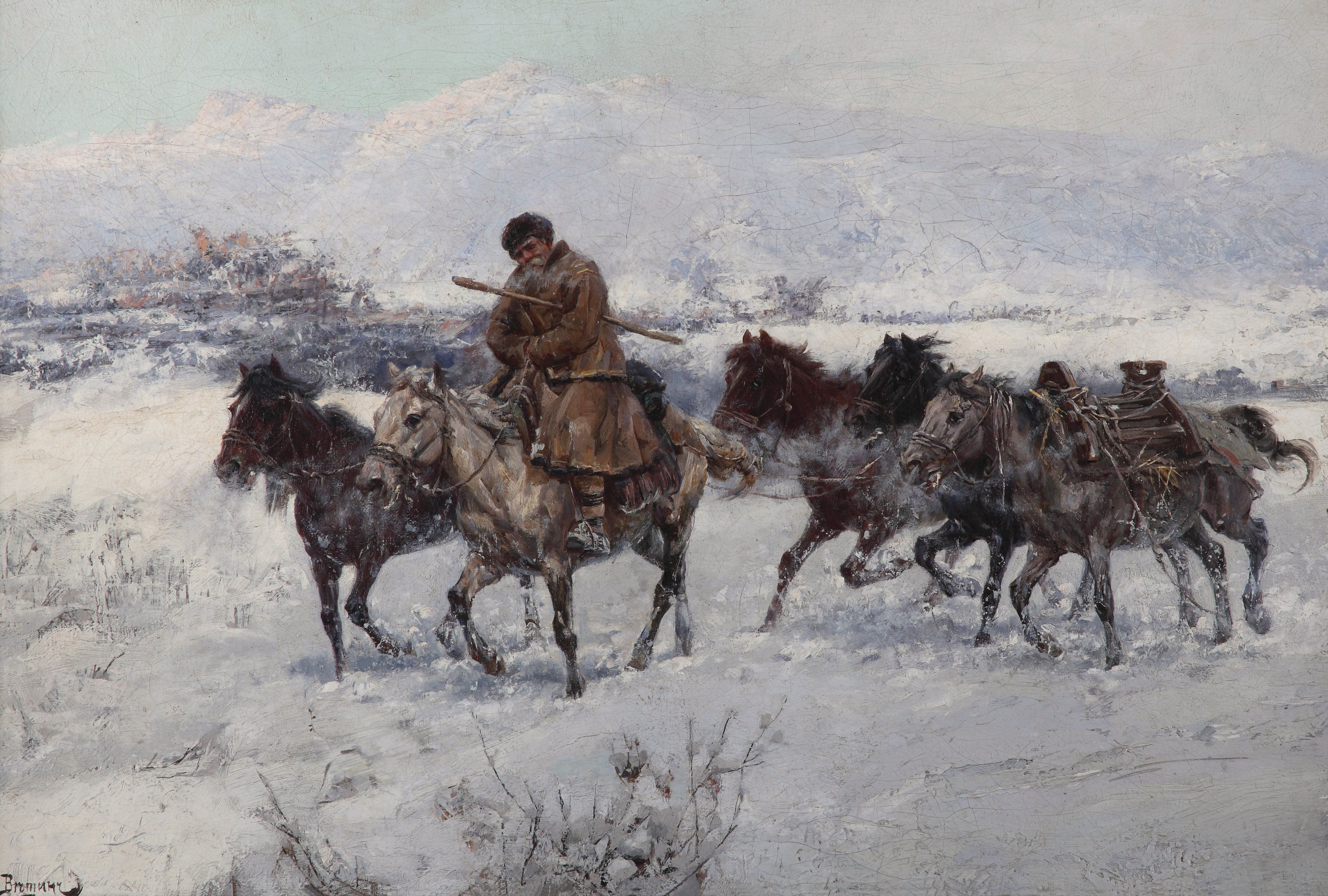
The Return from the Market, 1898

Věšín was born in the town of Vraný in what is today Kladno District of the Central Bohemian Region. He studied at the Academy of Fine Arts in Prague, but moved to the Academy of Fine Arts Munich in 1881 and graduated in 1883.

Afterwards he worked in Munich and in Slovakia, with his paintings of the period mainly related to Slovak village life. Věšín arrived in Bulgaria in 1897 and remained there for the remainder of his life. Until 1904, he was a professor at the National Academy of Fine Arts in Sofia and mainly worked in the area of genre painting, with notable paintings such as Threshing near Radomir (1897), Ploughman (or Land, 1899), Horse market in Sofia (1899), Smugglers (1899), In front of a market (1899), Threshing (1900), etc. The main topic of his interest was the life and labour of the Bulgarian villager.

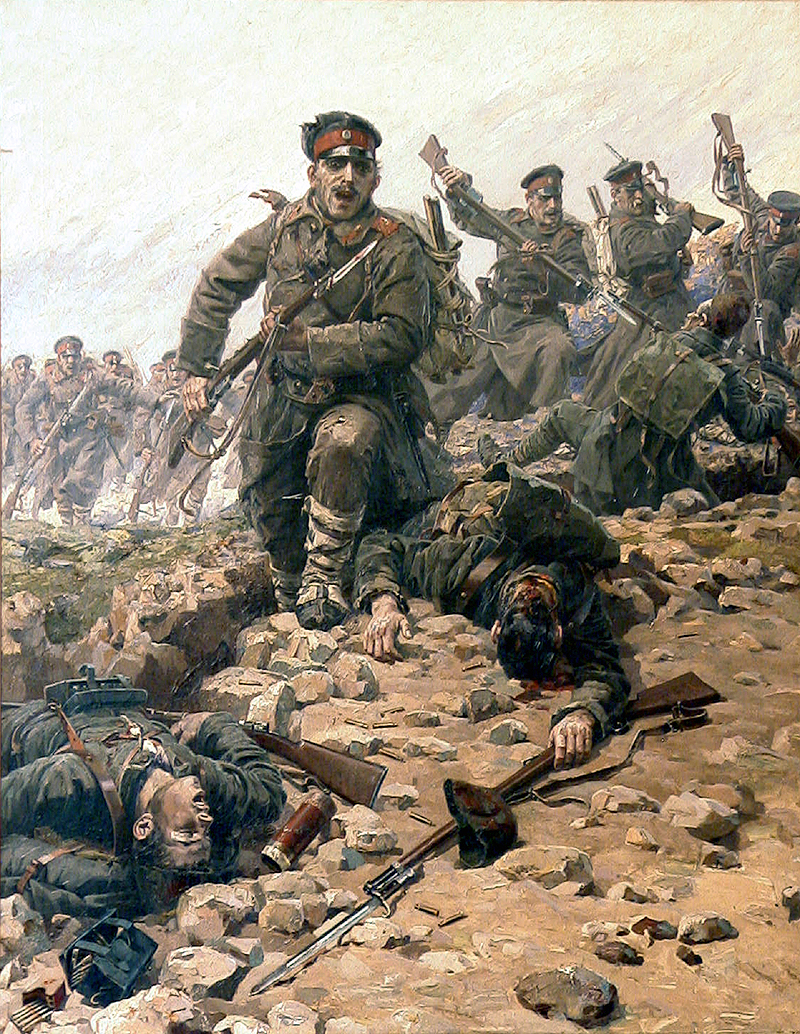
Bayonet Charge, 1913

After 1904, Věšín became the head painter with the Ministry of War and, although he did not abandon his old interests (with works such as Coaler (1910), Lumberjacks (1910), On the game's track (1910), Hunter with hounds (1911), etc.), he became famous with his masterpieces of battle painting: Manoeuvres (series began in 1899 and lasted until the Balkan Wars, The Samara flag (1911), Bayonet Charge (or Bulgarians overrun the Turkish positions, 1913), The Turkish retreat at Lüleburgaz (1913), Lüleburgaz-Çatalca (1913) and a series of sketches and complete works on the siege of Edirne, among which Bibouac in front of Edirne (1913), Resting after 13 March 1913 (1913), etc.

Many of his works are displayed in the National Museum of Fine Arts in Sofia. Among Věšín's students were Nikola Petrov, Atanas Mihov, and other major Bulgarian painters.
