= Gudkov =

Gudkov (Russian: Гудков, from гудок meaning toot) is a Russian masculine surname, and its feminine counterpart is Gudkova. Notable people with the surname include:

- Aleksei Gudkov (born 1972), Russian football player
- Dmitry Gudkov (born 1980), Russian politician
- Dmitry Gudkov (mathematician) (1918–1992), Russian mathematician
- Evgeny Gudkov (born 1978), Russian Paralympic javelin thrower
- Gennady Gudkov (born 1956), Russian politician and businessman
- Lev Gudkov (born 1946), Russian sociologist
- Mikhail Gudkov (1983–2025), Russian major general.
- Tatyana Gudkova (born 1978), Russian race walker
- Tatyana Gudkova (fencer) (born 1993, Russian fencer
