= Petačinci =

Petačinci Петачинци
- Village
- Location within Serbia
- Country: Serbia
- Region: Southern and Eastern Serbia
- District: Pirot
- Municipality: Dimitrovgrad

Population (2002)
  - Total: 19
- Time zone: UTC+1 (CET)
  - Summer (DST): UTC+2 (CEST)

Petačinci is a village in the municipality of Dimitrovgrad, Serbia. According to the 2002 census, the village has a population of 19 people.
