= Vraný =

- Market town
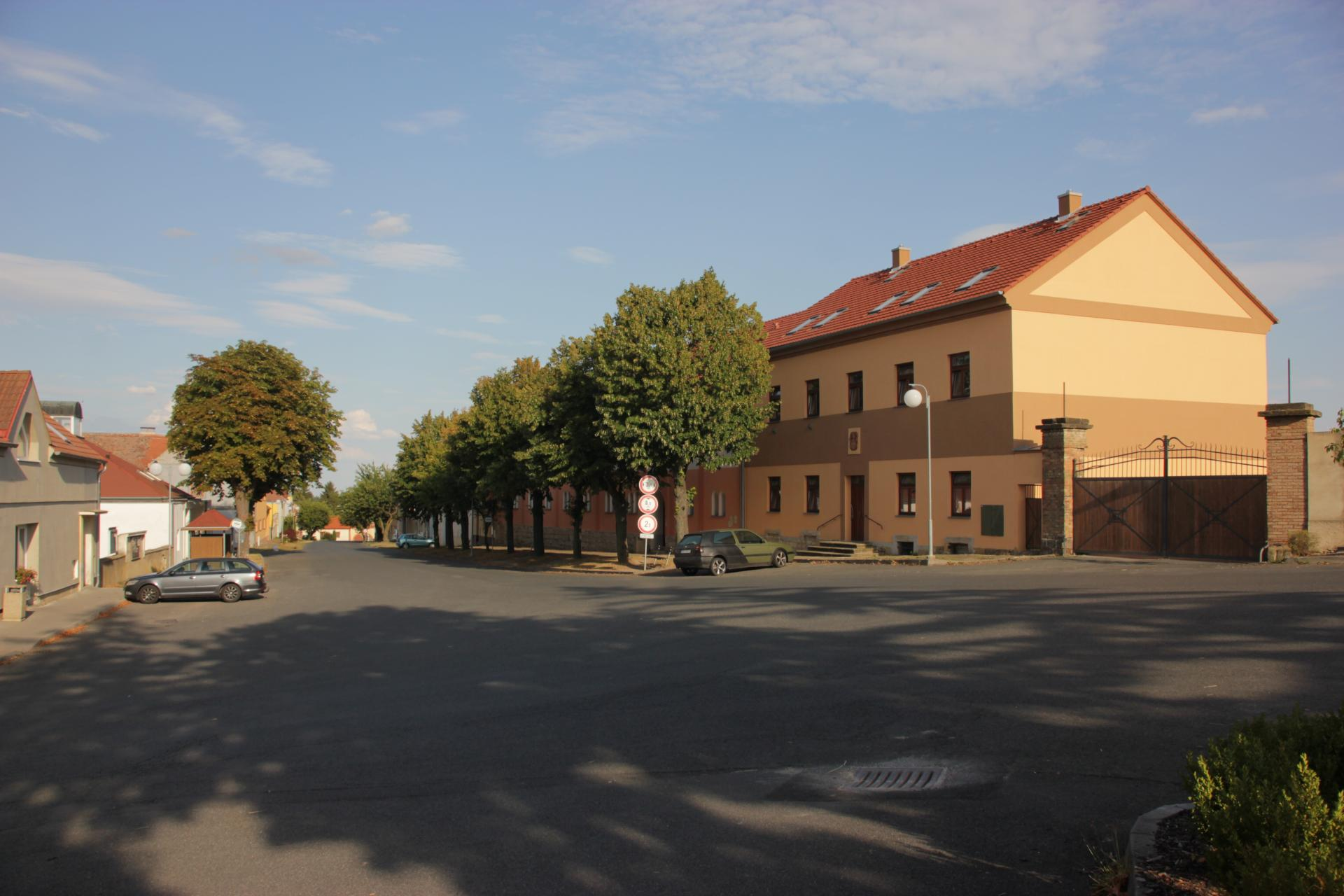
- Centre of Vraný

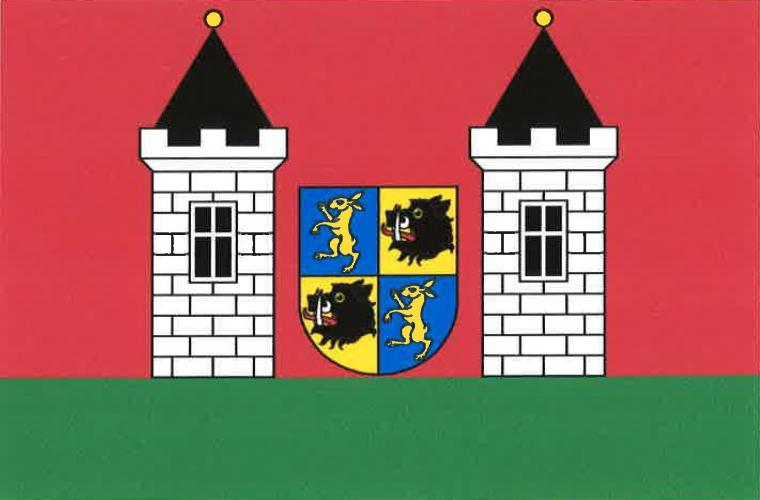
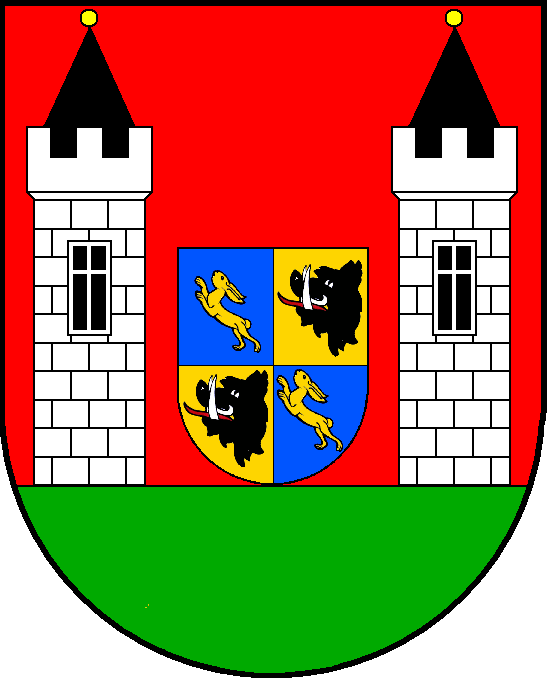
- Flag Coat of arms

- Location in the Czech Republic
- Coordinates: 50°19′38″N 14°1′2″E
- Country: Czech Republic
- Region: Central Bohemian
- District: Kladno
- First mentioned: 1228

Area
  - Total: 17.01 km^{2} (6.57 sq mi)
- Elevation: 290 m (950 ft)

Population (2026-01-01)
  - Total: 780
  - Density: 46/km^{2} (120/sq mi)
- Time zone: UTC+1 (CET)
  - Summer (DST): UTC+2 (CEST)
- Postal codes: 273 72, 273 73
- Website: www.mestysvrany.cz

Vraný (Czech pronunciation: [ˈvraniː]) is a market town in Kladno District in the Central Bohemian Region of the Czech Republic. It has about 800 inhabitants.

== Administrative division ==
Vraný consists of three municipal parts (in brackets population according to the 2021 census):

- Vraný (624)
- Horní Kamenice (50)
- Lukov (82)

== Etymology ==
The name is derived from the personal name Vrána, meaning "Vrána's settlement".

== Geography ==
Vraný is located about 21 kilometres (13 mi) north of Kladno and 36 km (22 mi) northwest of Prague. It lies in the Lower Ohře Table. The highest point is at 330 m (1,083 ft) above sea level. The stream Vranský potok originates in the western part of the municipal territory and then flows through the market town.

== History ==
The first written mention of Vraný is from 1228, when it was the property of the Basilica of Saint George in Prague. After it changed several less important owners, it was acquired by the Zajíc of Hazmburk family in 1434, who owned it until 1534. During their rule in 1513, Vraný was promoted to a market town by King Vladislaus II. The market town was badly damaged during the Thirty Years' War and lost most of its inhabitants, but it recovered. From 1706 to 1945, Vraný was owned by the Metropolitan Chapter at Saint Vitus.

In 1980, the municipalities of Horní Kamenice and Lukov were annexed to Vraný.

== Demographics ==
Historical population

Year	Pop.	±%
1869	1,223	—
1880	1,327	+8.5%
1890	1,385	+4.4%
1900	1,440	+4.0%
1910	1,346	−6.5%

Year	Pop.	±%
1921	1,348	+0.1%
1930	1,304	−3.3%
1950	925	−29.1%
1961	1,005	+8.6%
1970	819	−18.5%

Year	Pop.	±%
1980	756	−7.7%
1991	741	−2.0%
2001	723	−2.4%
2011	728	+0.7%
2021	756	+3.8%

Source: Censuses

== Transport ==
There are no railways or major roads running through the municipal territory.

== Sights ==
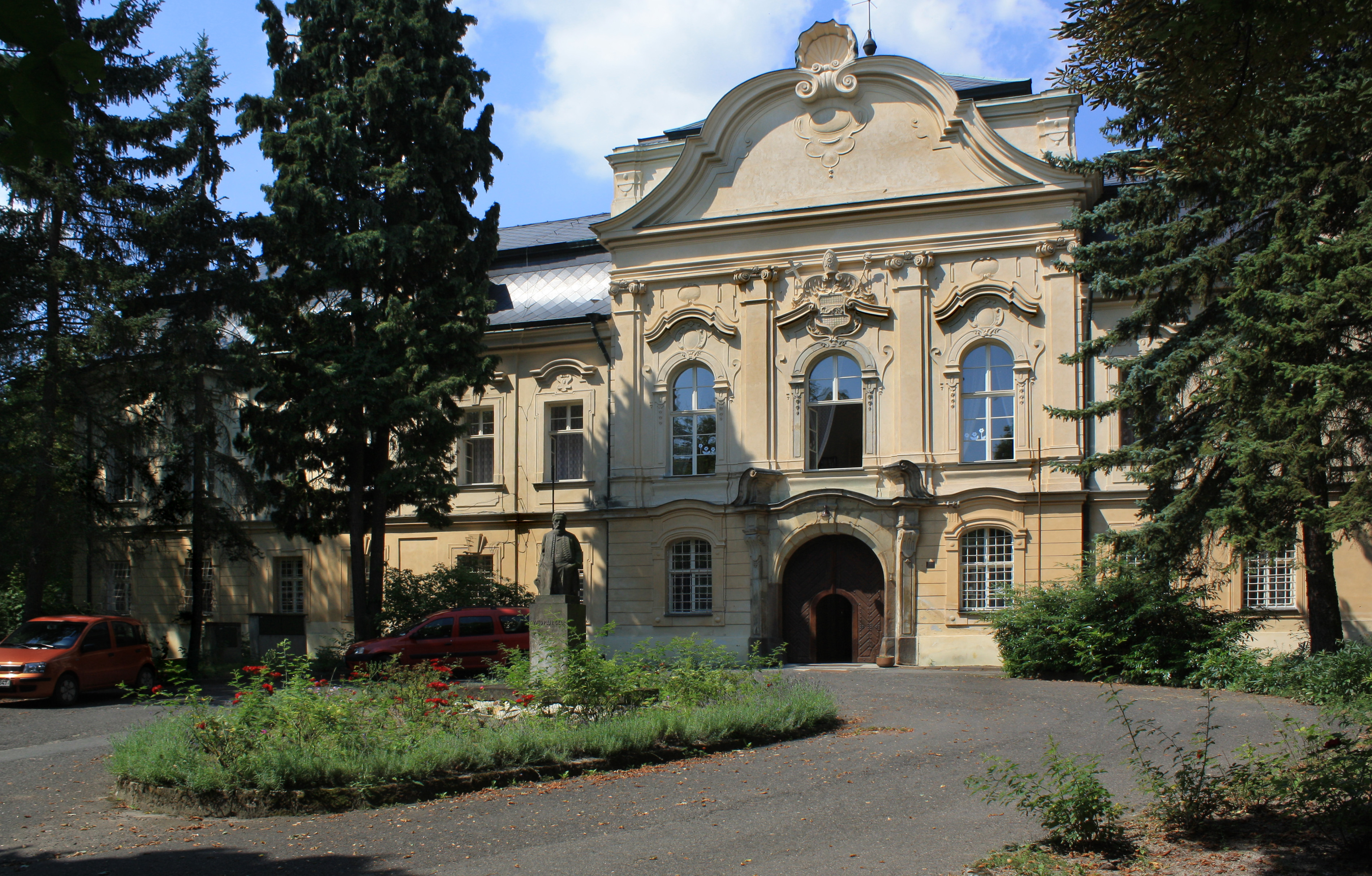
Vraný Castle

The Vraný Castle was built for the Metropolitan Chapter at Saint Vitus in 1764–1769. It is a small late Baroque residence with a Rococo façade. Today it houses a retirement home.

The Church of Saint John the Baptist was built in 1756–1761. It is a late Baroque church, that replaced an old Gothic building that fell into disrepair during the Thirty Years' War. The tower was rebuilt in 1908 by the architect Josef Fanta.

The Church of Saint George in Lukov was originally a Romanesque rotunda, probably from the 13th century. In the 18th century, it was completely rebuilt into its current Baroque form.

== Notable people ==
- Jaroslav Věšín (1860–1915), painter
