= Lukov (Třebíč District) =

- Municipality
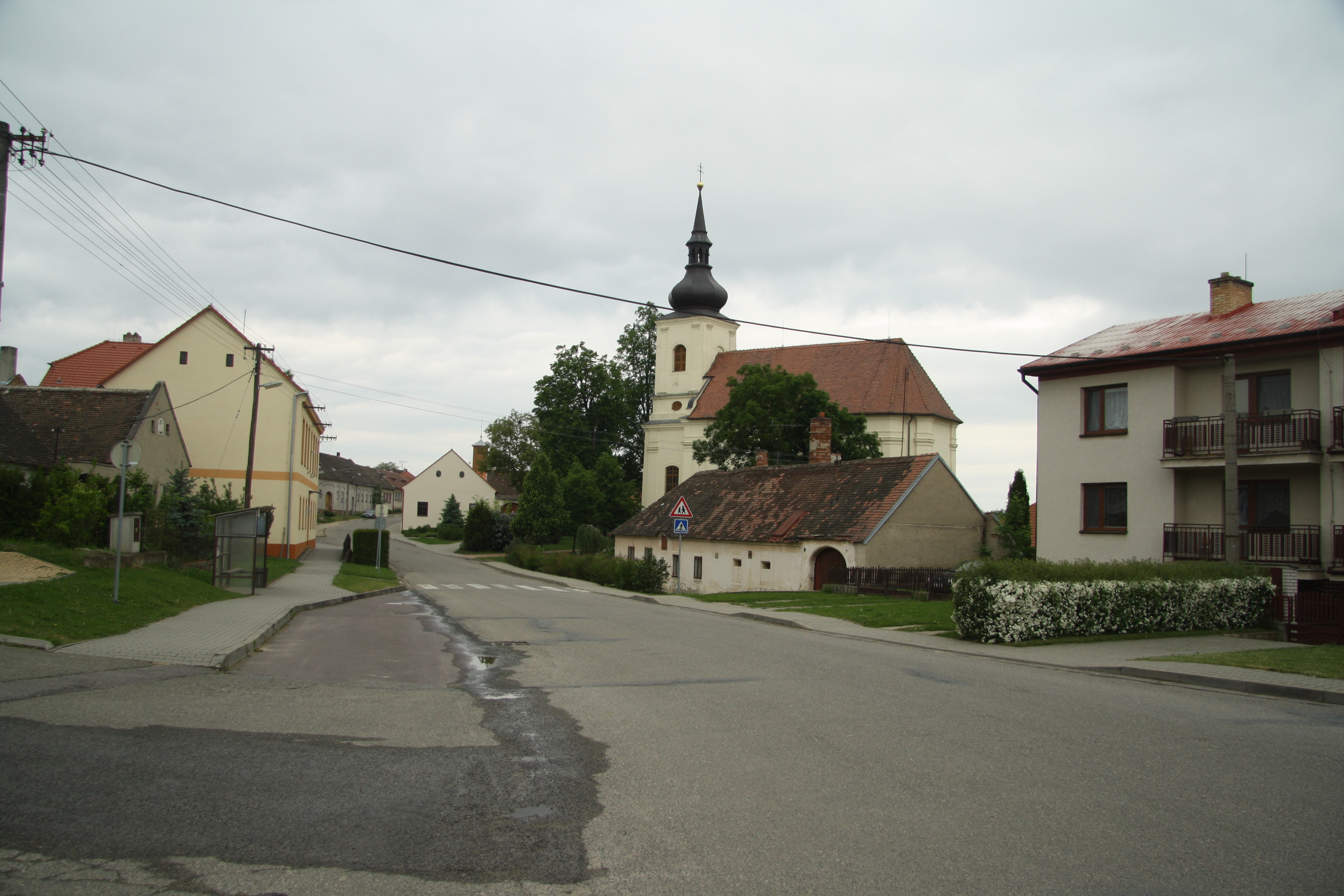
- Centre of Lukov

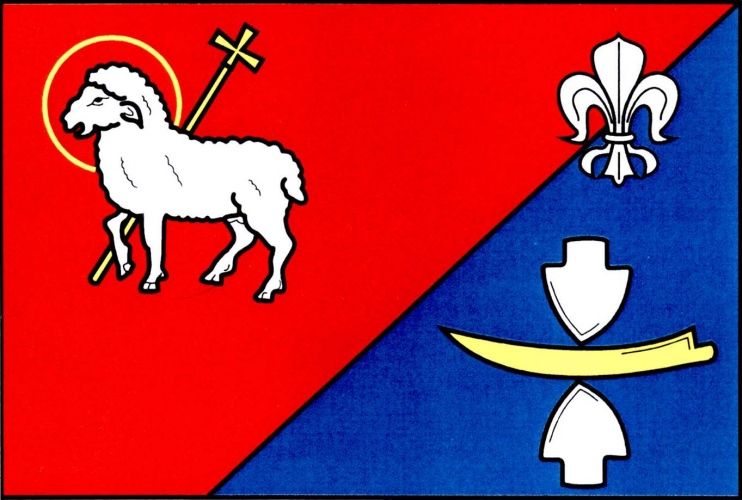
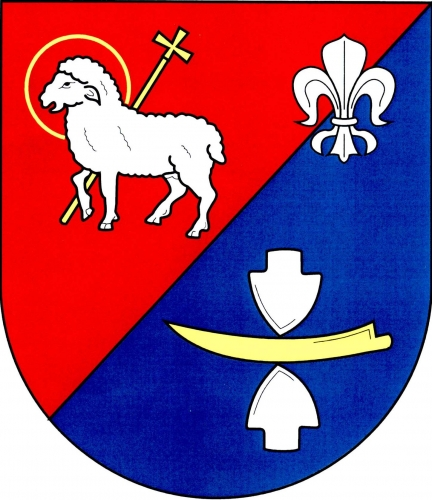
- Flag Coat of arms

- Location in the Czech Republic
- Coordinates: 49°4′25″N 15°49′27″E
- Country: Czech Republic
- Region: Vysočina
- District: Třebíč
- First mentioned: 1235

Area
  - Total: 8.71 km^{2} (3.36 sq mi)
- Elevation: 445 m (1,460 ft)

Population (2026-01-01)
  - Total: 389
  - Density: 44.7/km^{2} (116/sq mi)
- Time zone: UTC+1 (CET)
  - Summer (DST): UTC+2 (CEST)
- Postal code: 676 02
- Website: www.obec-lukov.cz

Lukov is a municipality and village in Třebíč District in the Vysočina Region of the Czech Republic. It has about 400 inhabitants.

Lukov lies approximately 17 kilometres (11 mi) south of Třebíč, 40 km (25 mi) south-east of Jihlava, and 152 km (94 mi) south-east of Prague.

== Demographics ==
Historical population
Year	Pop.	±%
1869	469	—
1880	432	−7.9%
1890	413	−4.4%
1900	489	+18.4%
1910	487	−0.4%
1921	500	+2.7%
1930	509	+1.8%
1950	462	−9.2%
1961	394	−14.7%
1970	371	−5.8%
1980	337	−9.2%
1991	295	−12.5%
2001	367	+24.4%
2011	377	+2.7%
2021	376	−0.3%
Source: Censuses

== Notable people ==
- Jan Bula (1920–1952), Roman Catholic priest
