= Lukov (Zlín District) =

- Municipality
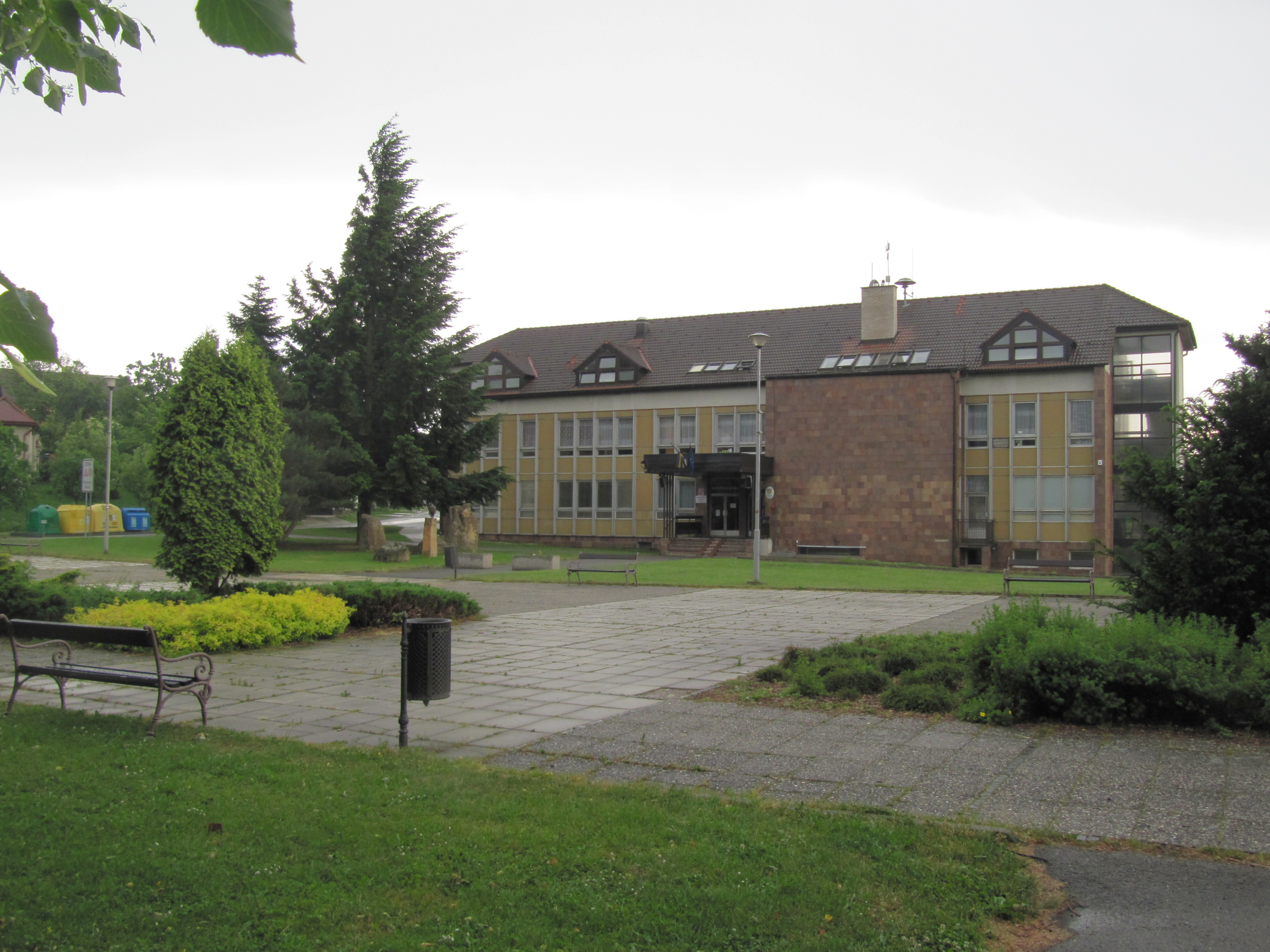
- Municipal office

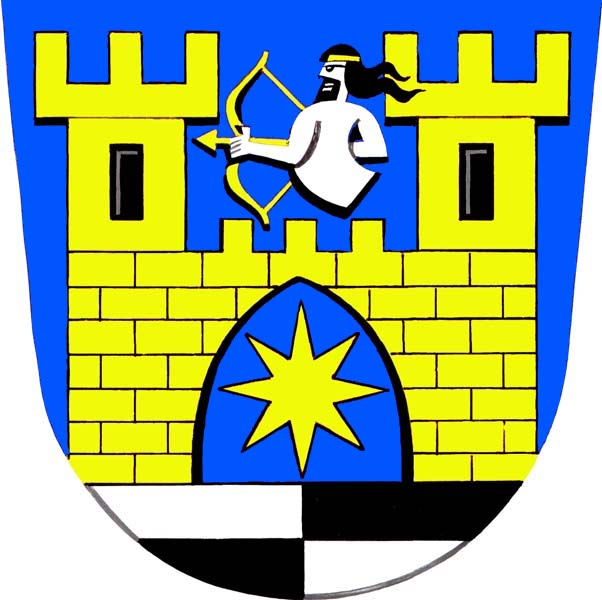
- Flag Coat of arms

- Location in the Czech Republic
- Coordinates: 49°17′25″N 17°43′47″E
- Country: Czech Republic
- Region: Zlín
- District: Zlín
- First mentioned: 1219

Area
  - Total: 10.85 km^{2} (4.19 sq mi)
- Elevation: 316 m (1,037 ft)

Population (2026-01-01)
  - Total: 1,768
  - Density: 162.9/km^{2} (422.0/sq mi)
- Time zone: UTC+1 (CET)
  - Summer (DST): UTC+2 (CEST)
- Postal code: 763 17
- Website: www.lukov.cz

Lukov is a municipality and village in Zlín District in the Zlín Region of the Czech Republic. It has about 1,800 inhabitants.

== Geography ==
Lukov is located about 8 kilometres (5 mi) northeast of Zlín. It lies on the border between the Hostýn-Vsetín Mountains and Vizovice Highlands. The highest point is at 586 m (1,923 ft) above sea level. The brooks Lukovský potok and Bělovodský potok flow through the municipality.

== History ==
The first written mention of Lukov Castle is in a deed of King Ottokar I from 1219. In 1332, Lukov was documented as a property of the Sternberg family. From 1334 to 1342, it was a royal property, but then the estate was again acquired by the Sternberg family. The Lukov Castle was conquered and burned by the army of Matthias Corvinus during the Austrian–Hungarian War (1477–1488), but after the war it was repaired and greatly enlarged.

In 1511, Lukov was bought by the Lords of Kunštát. However, due to financial difficulties, they sold Lukov already in 1547. The new owners of the estate, the Nekša of Landek family, had rebuilt the castle into a Renaissance residence. In 1614, Lukov was inherited by Albrecht von Wallenstein, whose wife was Lucretia Nekšová of Landek. During the Thirty Years' War, when Lukov was owned by the Minkvic of Minkvicburk family, the Swedish army conquered the castle and damaged it.

Due to debts, the Minkvics sold Lukov in 1710 to Jan Josef Rottal. In 1724, he sold Lukov to the Counts of Seilern-Aspang. They did not live in Lukov, so during their rule the castle lost its importance until it was abandoned at the end of the 18th century and fell into disrepair.

== Demographics ==
Historical population

Year	Pop.	±%
1869	737	—
1880	824	+11.8%
1890	840	+1.9%
1900	951	+13.2%
1910	965	+1.5%

Year	Pop.	±%
1921	828	−14.2%
1930	826	−0.2%
1950	952	+15.3%
1961	1,270	+33.4%
1970	1,277	+0.6%

Year	Pop.	±%
1980	1,348	+5.6%
1991	1,441	+6.9%
2001	1,676	+16.3%
2011	1,742	+3.9%
2021	1,726	−0.9%

Source: Censuses

== Transport ==
There are no railways or major roads passing through the municipality.

== Sights ==
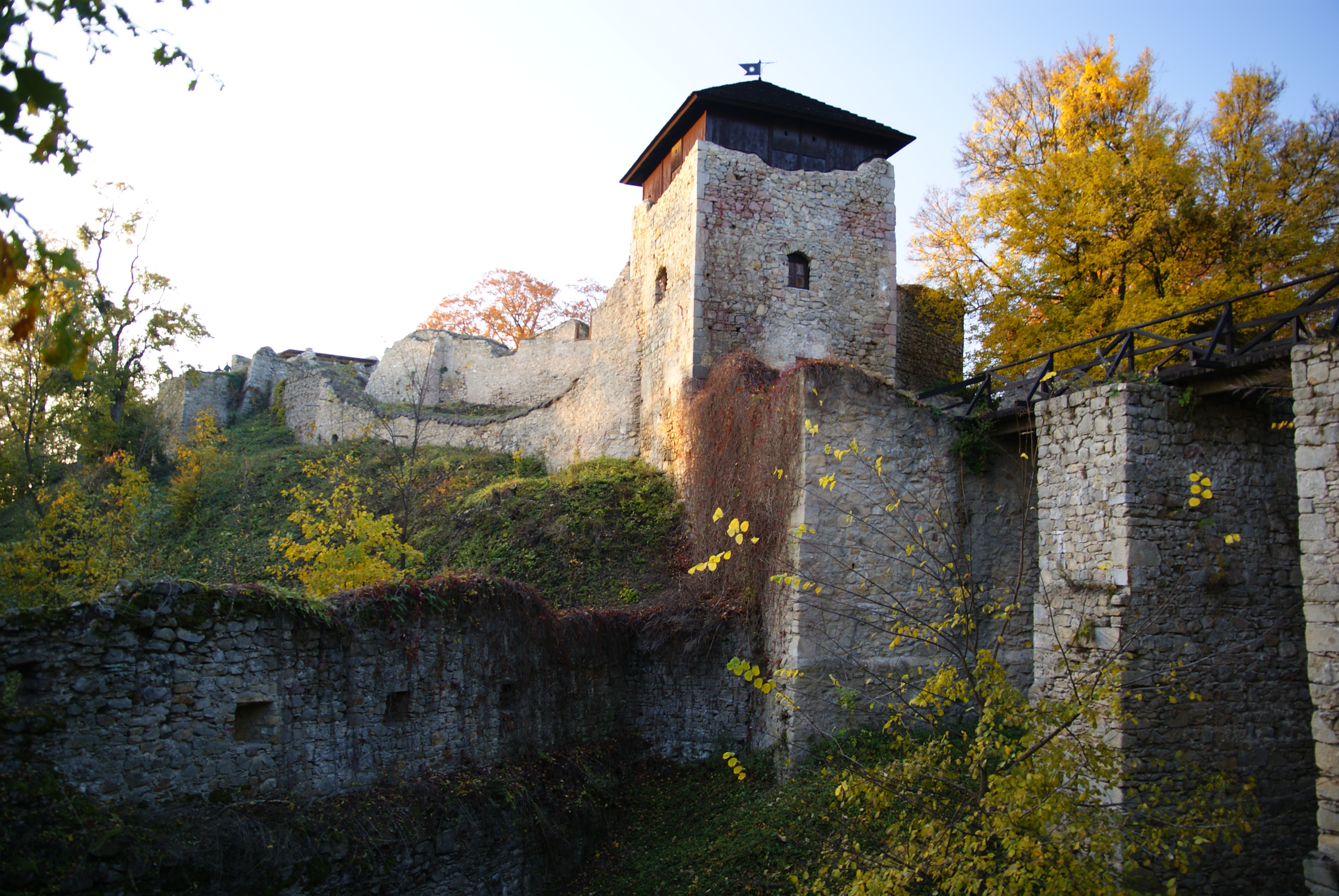
Lukov Castle

Lukov is known for the Lukov Castle. It is a ruin of one of the largest and oldest Moravian castles. It was built in the first quarter of the 13th century. In 1548, the Gothic castle was partly rebuilt in the Renaissance style. At the end of the 18th century, it was abandoned. From 1987, it was gradually repaired. Today it is open to the public.

A landmark of the centre of Lukov is the Church of Saint Joseph. It was built in 1810–1813.
