= Lukov Castle =

Coordinates: 49.3032°N 17.7400°E

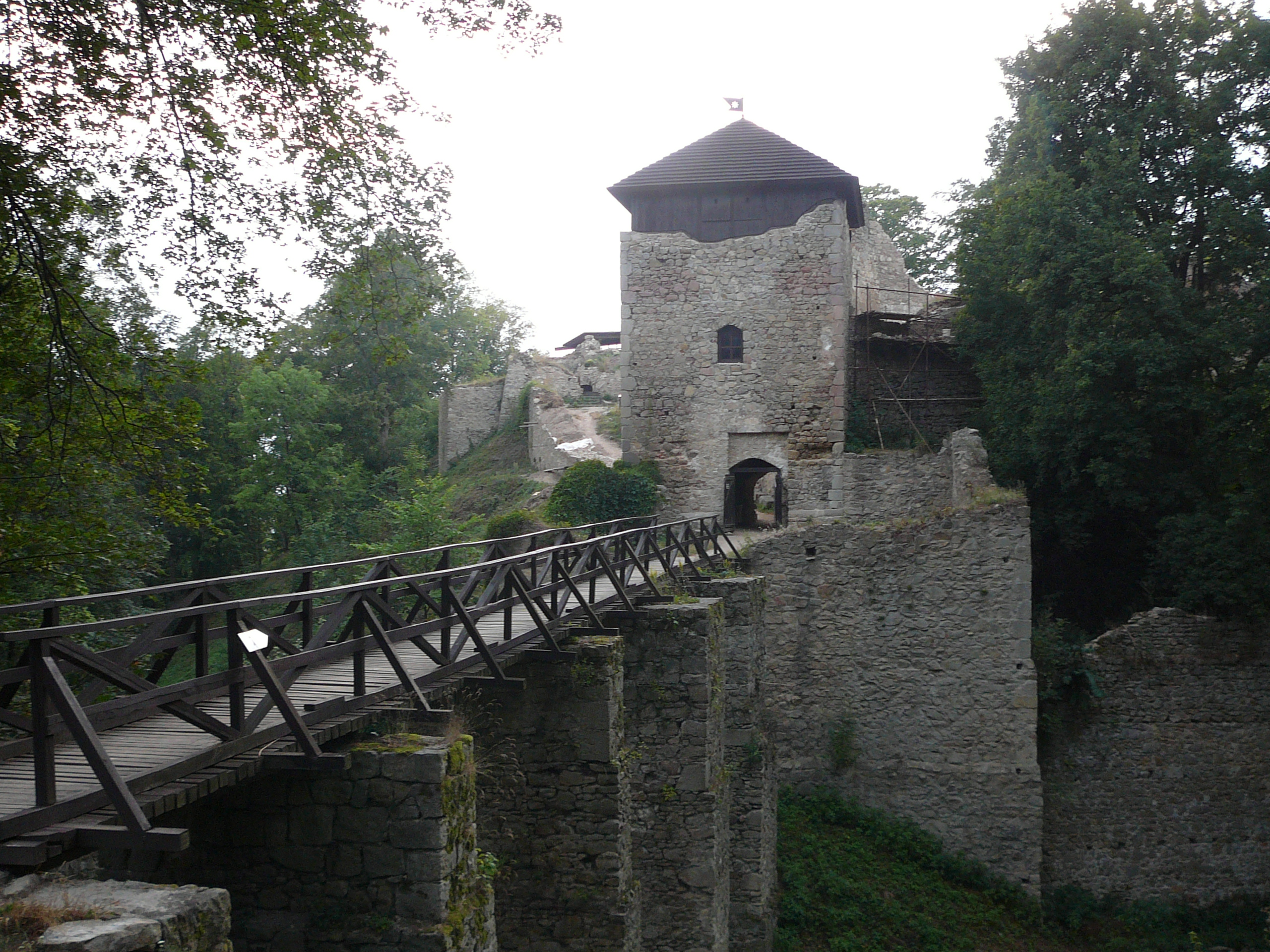
Main gate

Lukov Castle is a large ruins of a Gothic royal castle in Lukov municipality in the Zlín Region of the Czech Republic. It is located in the southwest of Hostýn-Vsetín Mountains. It is one of the largest and oldest Moravian castles.

== History ==
The first reliable written reference about the castle Lukov dates back to the year 1332, during the rule of John of Bohemia. However, it is very likely that the castle was built in the first half of the 13th century by a Czech king. It is also believed to be mentioned by Constance of Hungary in her charter from the year 1235. The managed to reconstruct the originally Romanesque chapel in the Gothic style and built a new east palace. The castle was sieged and subsequently conquered by Matthias Corvinus in the year 1469.

The Sternbergs owned the castle until the year 1516 when it was claimed by the Lords of Kunštát, who kept the castle until 1547 and started the radical reconstruction of the castle into a Renaissance fortress, followed by Lords of Landek. After the death of Lukrécie Nekeš of Landek in 1614, the castle was inherited by her husband, military leader and politician Albrecht von Wallenstein. During the Thirty Years' War, the castle was captured by the rebelling Valachs, who made it their base until October 1627 when they were ousted by the Imperial army. Albrecht von Wallenstein sold the castle to Štěpán Šmíd of Freyhofen in 1624. The castle was captured by the Swedes in 1643, who tore down its defences upon leaving in the same year. After this event, no significant efforts were made to reconstruct the castle. By the end of 18th century, the castle was left completely abandoned and slowly turned into a ruin.

== Present ==
Since 1983, the castle has been a subject of extensive voluntary restoration works by the Friends of Castle Lukov (Czech: Spolek přátel hradu Lukova) and the Brontosaurus Movement, as well as archaeological research.

== Fauna ==
There were recorded 35 species of land gastropods in Lukov Castle in 2004-2006.

== Gallery ==
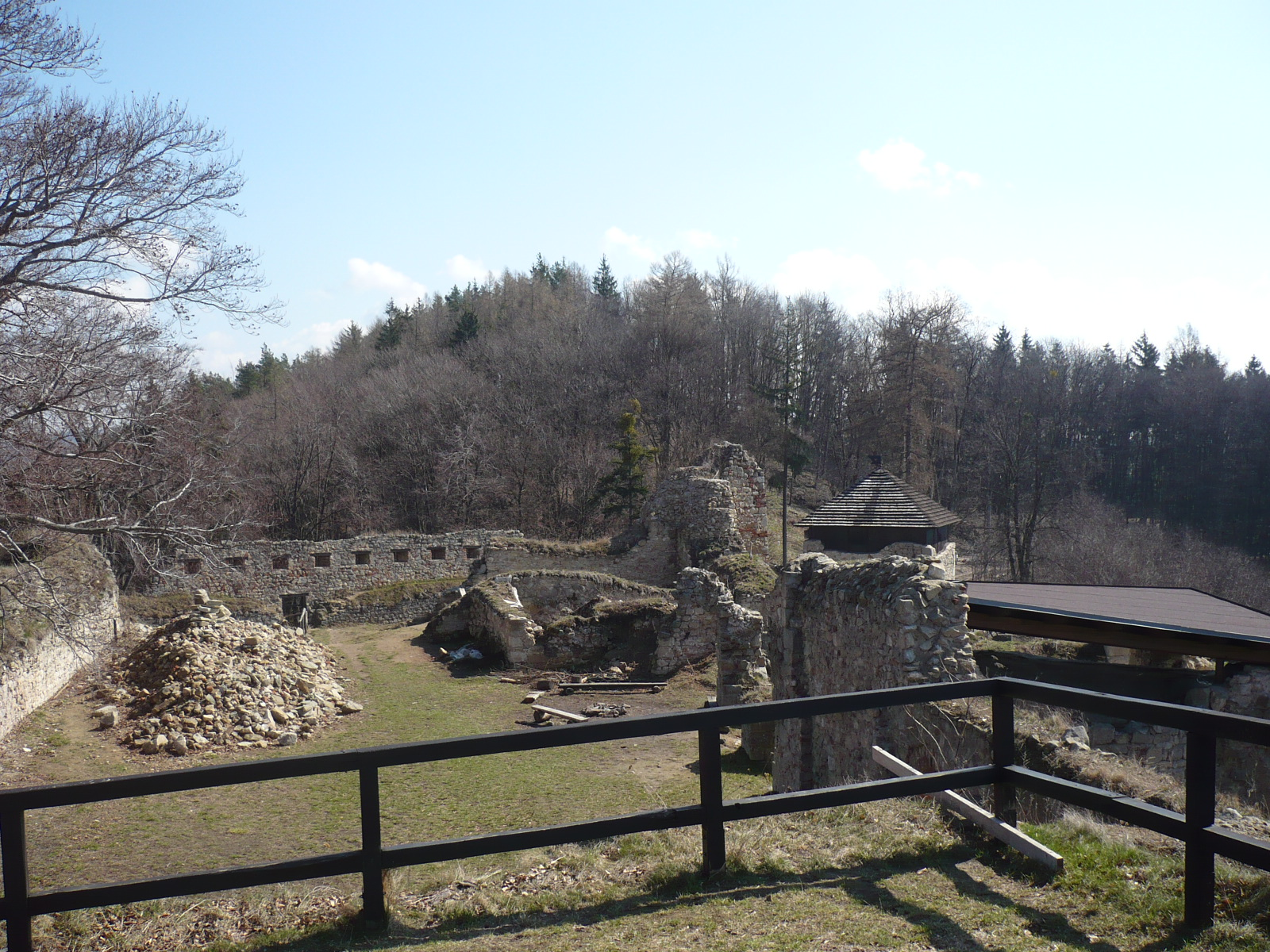
Inner courtyard

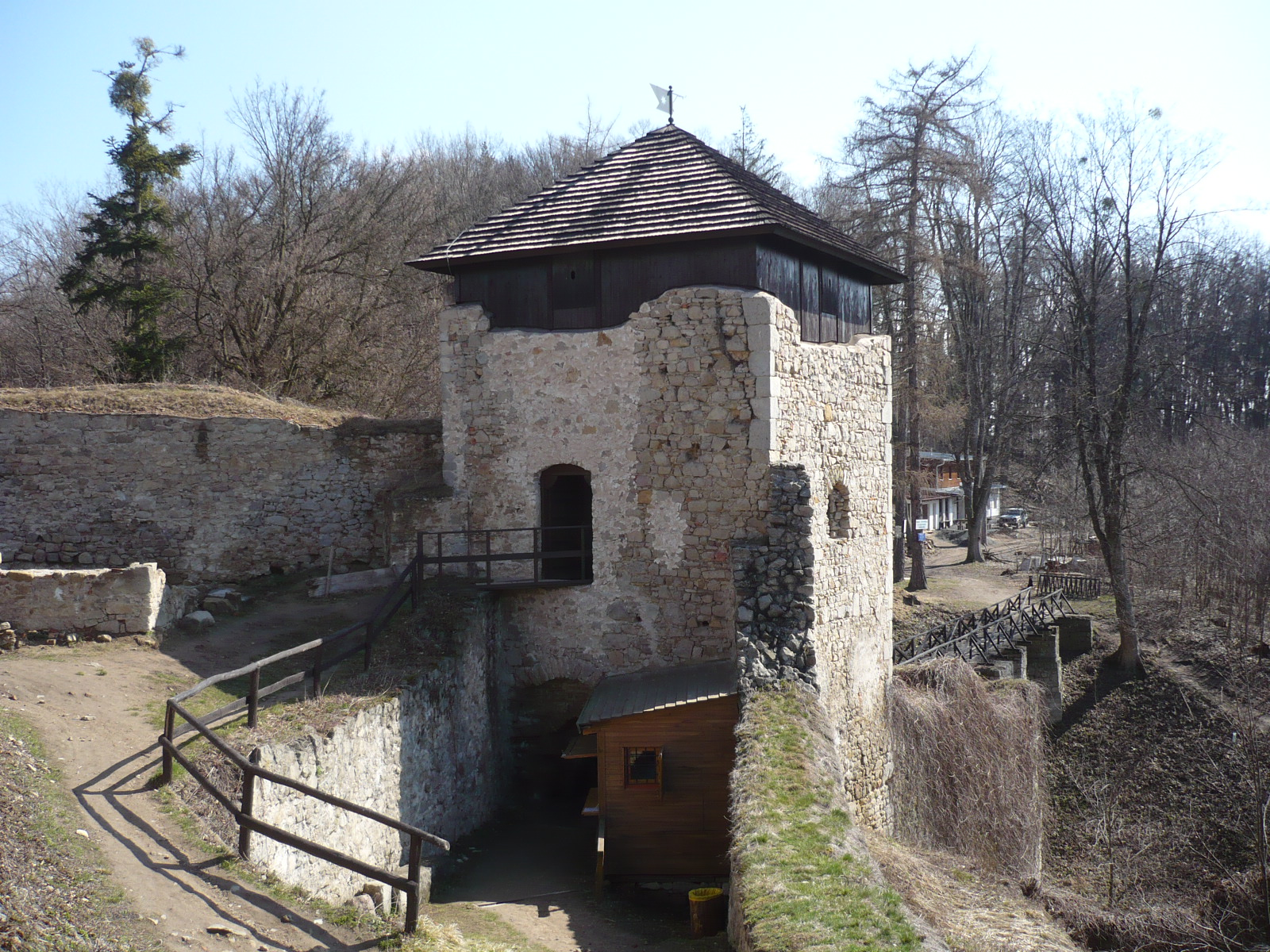
Main gate from the inside

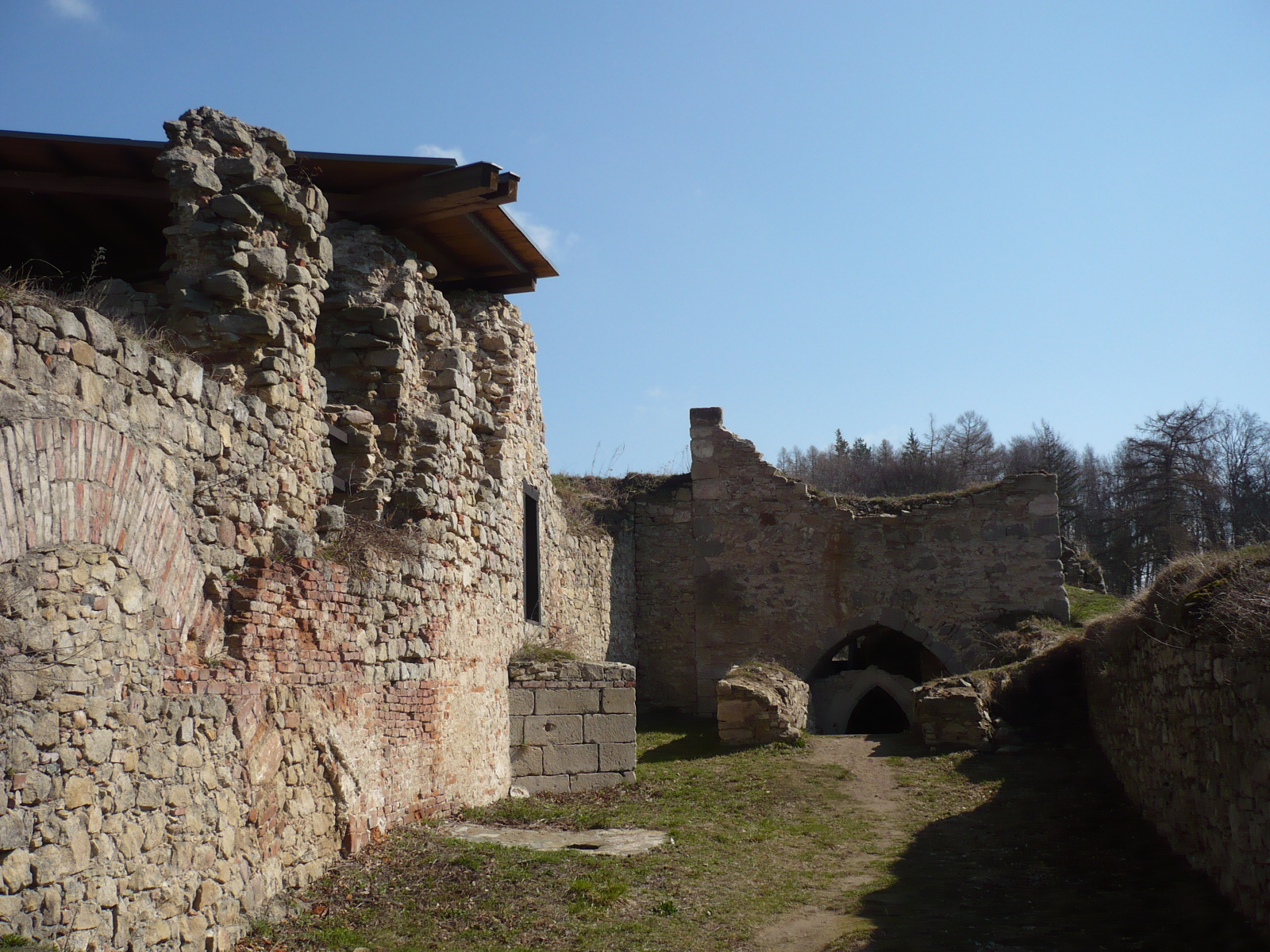
Gothic gate
