= Rokytnice (Zlín District) =

- Municipality
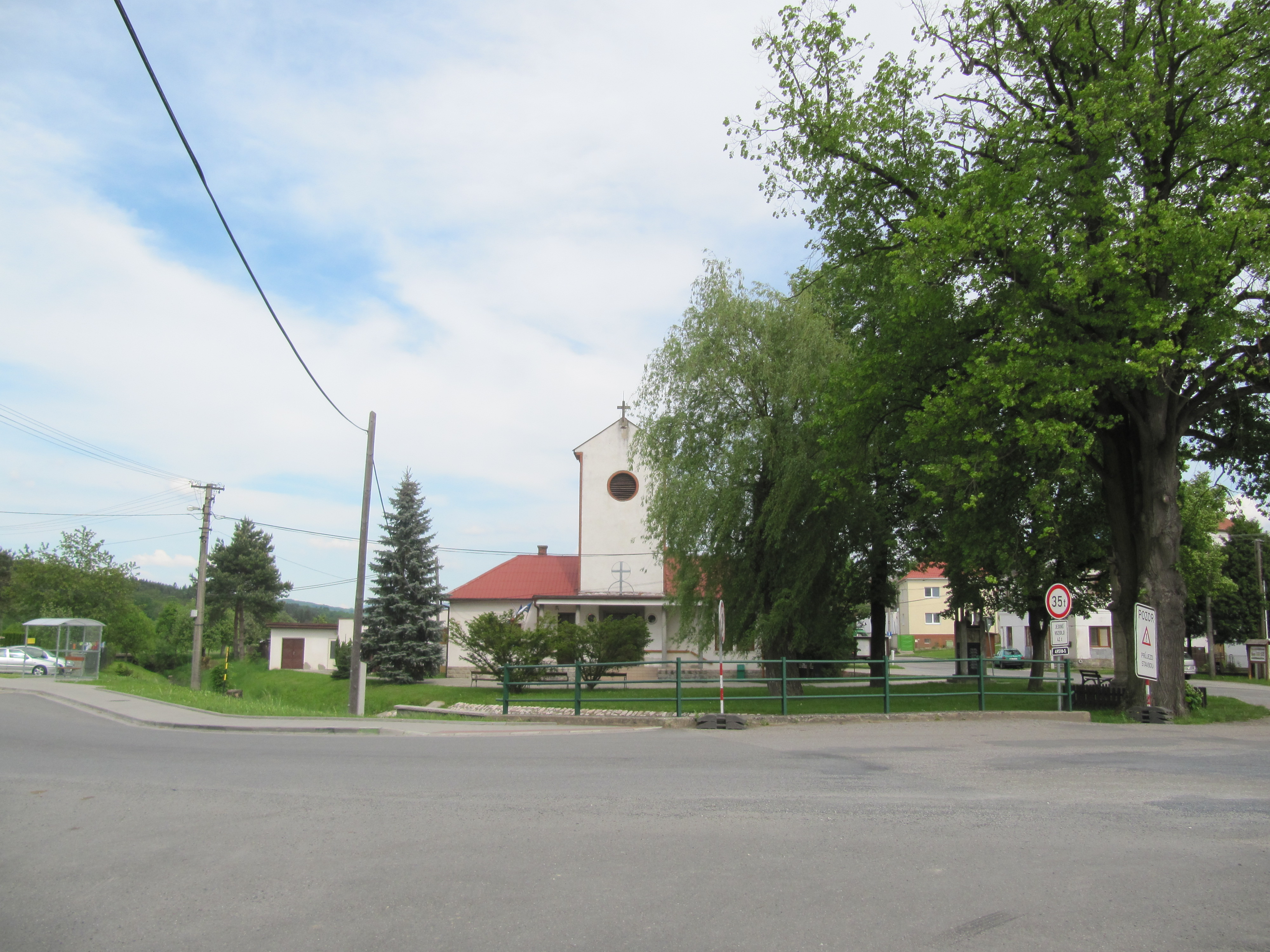
- Centre of Rokytnice

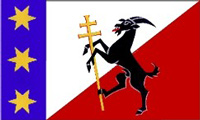
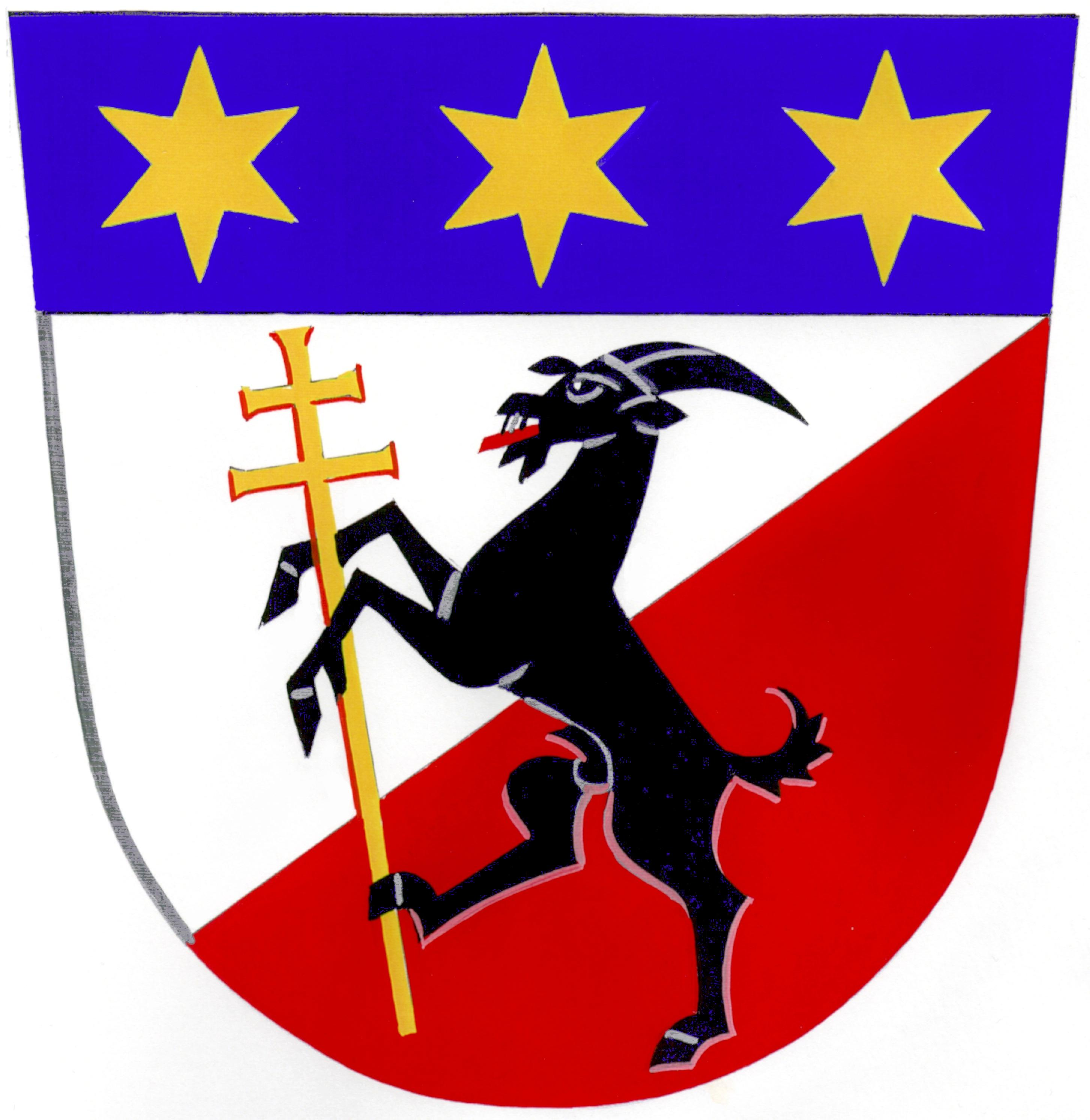
- Flag Coat of arms

- Location in the Czech Republic
- Coordinates: 49°3′58″N 17°54′41″E
- Country: Czech Republic
- Region: Zlín
- District: Zlín
- First mentioned: 1503

Area
  - Total: 9.98 km^{2} (3.85 sq mi)
- Elevation: 358 m (1,175 ft)

Population (2026-01-01)
  - Total: 587
  - Density: 58.8/km^{2} (152/sq mi)
- Time zone: UTC+1 (CET)
  - Summer (DST): UTC+2 (CEST)
- Postal code: 763 21
- Website: www.rokytnice.org

Rokytnice is a municipality and village in Zlín District in the Zlín Region of the Czech Republic. It has about 600 inhabitants.

Rokytnice lies approximately 27 kilometres (17 mi) south-east of Zlín and 278 km (173 mi) south-east of Prague.

== Administrative division ==
Rokytnice consists of two municipal parts (in brackets population according to the 2021 census):

- Rokytnice (502)
- Kochavec (51)

== Demographics ==
Historical population
Year	Pop.	±%
1869	417	—
1880	449	+7.7%
1890	449	+0.0%
1900	493	+9.8%
1910	554	+12.4%
1921	557	+0.5%
1930	667	+19.7%
1950	612	−8.2%
1961	675	+10.3%
1970	794	+17.6%
1980	723	−8.9%
1991	603	−16.6%
2001	591	−2.0%
2011	550	−6.9%
2021	553	+0.5%
Source: Censuses

== Notable people ==
- Jindřich Mikulec (born 1928), gymnast
