= Luková =

- Municipality
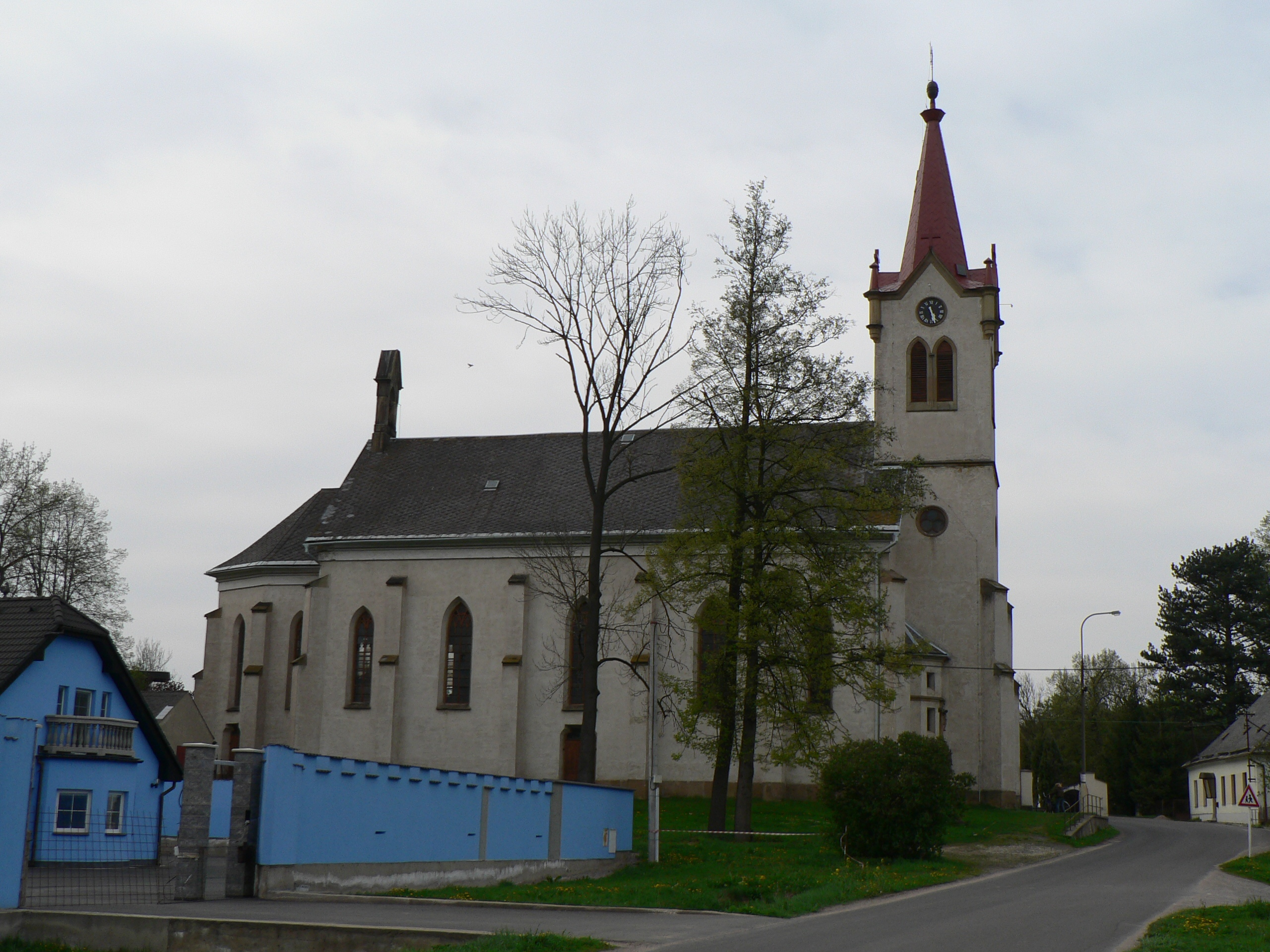
- Church of Saint Margaret

- Flag Coat of arms

- Location in the Czech Republic
- Coordinates: 49°52′32″N 16°36′24″E
- Country: Czech Republic
- Region: Pardubice
- District: Ústí nad Orlicí
- First mentioned: 1304

Area
  - Total: 14.59 km^{2} (5.63 sq mi)
- Elevation: 370 m (1,210 ft)

Population (2026-01-01)
  - Total: 763
  - Density: 52.3/km^{2} (135/sq mi)
- Time zone: UTC+1 (CET)
  - Summer (DST): UTC+2 (CEST)
- Postal code: 561 23
- Website: www.lukova.cz

Luková (German: Sichelsdorf) is a municipality and village in Ústí nad Orlicí District in the Pardubice Region of the Czech Republic. It has about 800 inhabitants.

Luková lies approximately 19 kilometres (12 mi) south-east of Ústí nad Orlicí, 62 km (39 mi) east of Pardubice, and 158 km (98 mi) east of Prague.

== Administrative division ==
Luková consists of two municipal parts (in brackets population according to the 2021 census):

- Luková (626)
- Květná (109)

== Demographics ==
Historical population
Year	Pop.	±%
1869	1,120	—
1880	1,137	+1.5%
1890	1,138	+0.1%
1900	1,135	−0.3%
1910	1,189	+4.8%
1921	1,073	−9.8%
1930	1,065	−0.7%
1950	664	−37.7%
1961	764	+15.1%
1970	749	−2.0%
1980	719	−4.0%
1991	690	−4.0%
2001	691	+0.1%
2011	682	−1.3%
2021	735	+7.8%
Source: Censuses
