= Rokytnice nad Rokytnou =

- Market town
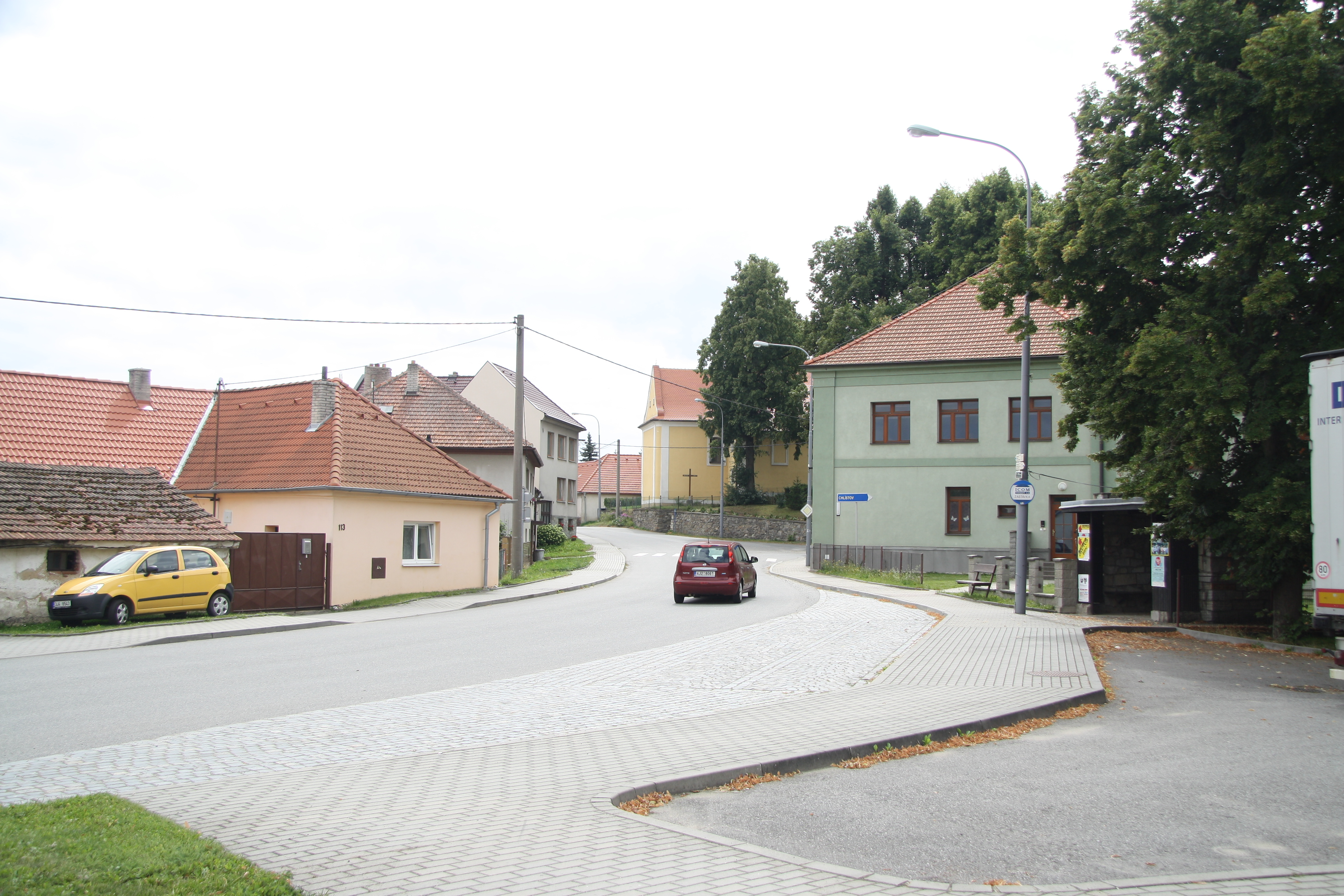
- Centre of Rokytnice nad Rokytnou

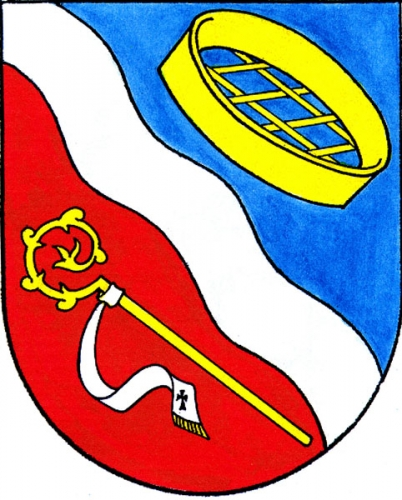
- Flag Coat of arms

- Location in the Czech Republic
- Coordinates: 49°11′4″N 15°46′22″E
- Country: Czech Republic
- Region: Vysočina
- District: Třebíč
- First mentioned: 1190

Area
  - Total: 8.08 km^{2} (3.12 sq mi)
- Elevation: 535 m (1,755 ft)

Population (2026-01-01)
  - Total: 836
  - Density: 103/km^{2} (268/sq mi)
- Time zone: UTC+1 (CET)
  - Summer (DST): UTC+2 (CEST)
- Postal code: 675 25
- Website: www.rokytnicenadrokytnou.cz

Rokytnice nad Rokytnou (Czech pronunciation: [ˈrokɪtɲɪtsɛ ˈnad rokɪtnou]) is a market town in Třebíč District in the Vysočina Region of the Czech Republic. It has about 800 inhabitants.

== Geography ==
Rokytnice nad Rokytnou is located about 8 kilometres (5 mi) southwest of Třebíč and 27 km (17 mi) southeast of Jihlava. It lies in the Jevišovice Uplands. The highest point is at 587 m (1,926 ft) above sea level. The upper course of the Rokytná River flows through the market town.

== History ==
The first written mention of Rokytnice is in the foundation deed of the Louka Monastery from 1190. It was owned by various lesser nobles. From 1695, it was part of the Sádek estate.

In 1880, Rokytnice nad Rokytnou was promoted to a market town.

== Demographics ==
Historical population

Year	Pop.	±%
1869	667	—
1880	704	+5.5%
1890	726	+3.1%
1900	713	−1.8%
1910	696	−2.4%

Year	Pop.	±%
1921	705	+1.3%
1930	767	+8.8%
1950	822	+7.2%
1961	928	+12.9%
1970	863	−7.0%

Year	Pop.	±%
1980	916	+6.1%
1991	875	−4.5%
2001	870	−0.6%
2011	876	+0.7%
2021	817	−6.7%

Source: Censuses

== Transport ==
The I/23 road (the section from Třebíč to Jindřichův Hradec) runs through the northern part of the municipal territory.

== Sights ==
The main landmark is the Church of Saint John the Baptist. It has a Romanesque core. It was rebuilt into its present Baroque form in 1750.
