= Nikola Petrov (painter) =

Bulgarian painter

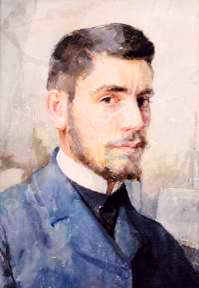
Self-portrait (date unknown)

Nikola Petrov (Bulgarian: Никола Петров; 19 August 1881, Vidin – 10 December 1916, Sofia) was a Bulgarian landscape painter and graphic artist; also known for his portrait sketches and watercolors.

== Biography ==
He displayed a talent for drawing while still in elementary school. When he was old enough, he went to Sofia and, in 1899, became part of the second group of students accepted for the newly organized State Drawing School (now the National Academy of Art). He studied with the sculptor Marin Vasilev and Jaroslav Věšín, a Czech battle painter. Despite these influences, he chose to concentrate on landscape painting.

In 1903, he joined the Society of Modern Art, a group devoted to promoting currents trends such as Impressionism, Symbolism and Art Nouveau. That same year, he was able to spend some time studying in Rome, thanks to a state scholarship.

He continued to pursue his own styles, however, and spent much of his time painting en plein air; a habit to which he had been introduced by Věšín. He was also one of the first Bulgarian painters to do cityscapes and is often referred to as the "Xудожника на София" (Painter of Sofia)“. Following his first showing in 1904, he participated in numerous exhibitions at home and abroad, including London (1907), Munich and Venice (1910), Belgrade (1912) and Berlin (1916).

In addition to his paintings, he helped decorate Alexander Nevsky Cathedral, provided drawings for children's magazines and illustrated a book of poems by Pencho Slaveykov.

He died of tuberculosis, aged only thirty-five. In 1961, the Nikola Petrov Gallery was opened in his hometown of Vidin. It contains over 1,300 works by Petrov and other notable Bulgarian artists. Several postage stamps featuring his works were issued in his honor on the centenary of his birth.

== Selected paintings ==
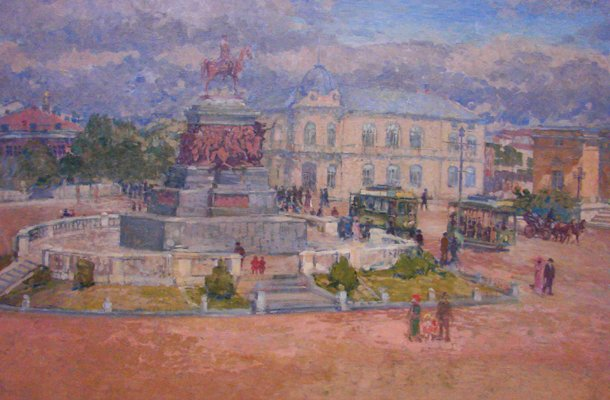
Monument to the Tsar Liberator

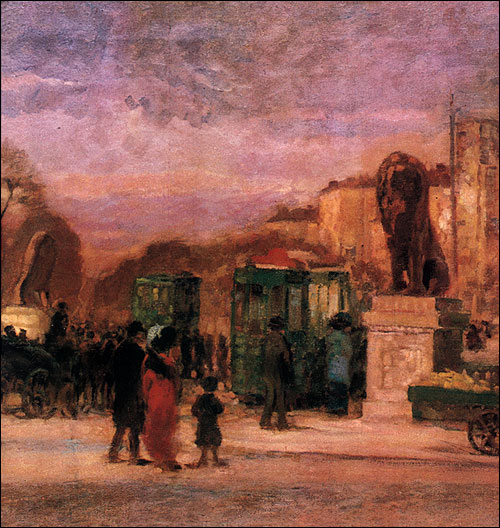
Lion's Bridge

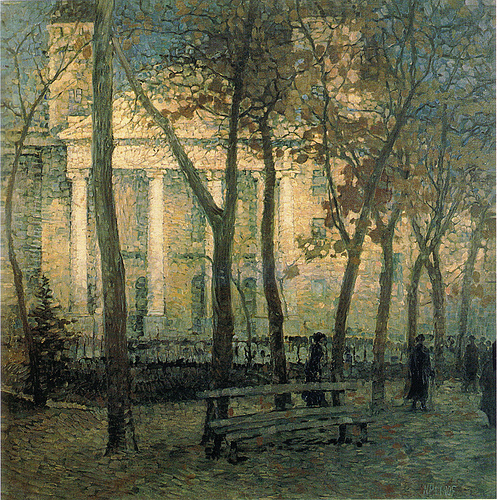
Bulgarian National Theater

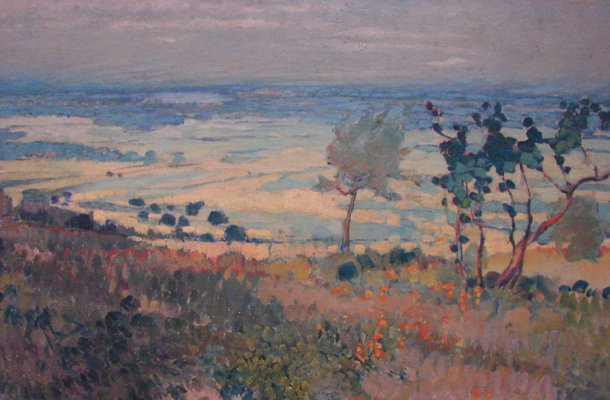
The Plains of Sofia
