= Lukov (surname) =

Lukov (Bulgarian: Луков) is a Slavic masculine surname, its feminine counterpart is Lukova. It may refer to:

- Hristo Lukov (1887–1943), Bulgarian military official and politician
- Ivan Lukov (1871–1926), Bulgarian military official
- Leonid Lukov (1909–1963), Russian film director and screenwriter
- Mariano Lukov (born 1958), Bulgarian table tennis player
- Vladimir Lukov (born 1949), Bulgarian poet
