= Kastanies–Ormenio National Road =

Trunk road in Greece

Kastanies–Ormenio National Road
- Εθνική Οδός Καστανιών - Ορμενίου
- Route of the Kastanies–Ormenio National Road, in blue

Route information
- Auxiliary route of EO51
- Part of E85
- Length: 33.1 km (20.6 mi)
- Existed: 15 December 1995–present

Major junctions
- East end: Kastanies
- West end: Border with Bulgaria (near Ormenio)

Location
- Country: Greece
- Regions: Eastern Macedonia and Thrace
- Primary destinations: Kastanies; Ormenio; Border with Bulgaria

Highway system
- Highways in Greece; Motorways; National roads
← EO	→ EO

The Kastanies–Ormenio National Road (Greek: Εθνική Οδός Καστανιών - Ορμενίου) is an unnumbered national road in north eastern Greece. Created by ministerial decree in 1995, the road runs from Kastanies to Ormenio and the border with Bulgaria, and is part of European route E85.

== Route ==
The Kastanies–Ormenio National Road is officially defined as an east–west branch of the EO51, located entirely within the Orestiada municipality of the Evros regional unit. The road branches off the EO51 at Kastanies, and heads west via Ormenio towards the border with Bulgaria, avoiding Edirne in Turkey: after crossing the border, the road becomes the II-80 (formerly II-88) towards Svilengrad.

The entire road is numbered the EO52 for statistical purposes by the National Statistical Service of Greece (ESYE), and is also part of European route E85.

=== Exit list ===
Municipality	Destinations	Notes
Orestiada	EO51 – Kastanies, Turkey (Edirne)	Intersection
Orestiada	Rizia, Kastanies, Turkey (Edirne)	
Orestiada	Kanadas, Marasia	
Orestiada	Krios	
Orestiada	Spilaio, Dikaia	Eastbound entry and exit only
Orestiada	Dikaia, Palli, Pentalofos	
Orestiada	Ptelea	Westbound exit and eastbound entry only
Orestiada	Ormenio, Petrota	
Orestiada	Bulgaria–Greece border (Schengen Area, no border controls); continues west as the II-80	
1.000 mi = 1.609 km; 1.000 km = 0.621 mi: Incomplete access

== History ==
Ministerial Decision DMEO/e/O/1308 of 15 December 1995 created the Kastanies–Ormenio National Road, and subclassified the road as part of the basic (primary) network. Border controls with Bulgaria, at the western end of the National Road, were abolished on 1 January 2025 when Bulgaria fully joined the Schengen Area.

=== Unrealised plan ===
Ministerial Decision DMEO/o/7157/e/1042 of 1 October 2008 planned to upgrade the Kastanies–Ormenio National Road and the adjacent EO51 to a motorway numbered the A21.
