= Marides =

Native Thracian tribe in Greece

Μάρηδες (Greek)
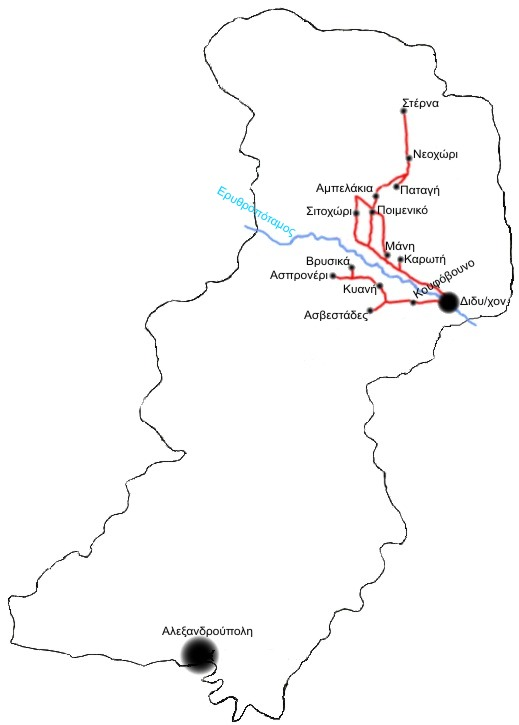
- The 13 villages in the northern part of the Evros prefecture in Greece, where the descendants of Marides live

Total population
- ~17.000

Languages
- Greek

Religion
- Greek Orthodox church

Related ethnic groups
- Greeks

The Marides (Greek: Μάρηδες) are a native Greek Thracian tribe with their own clothing and language idioms, with their descendants living mainly in 13 villages in the northern part of the Prefecture of Evros in Greece.

== Naming ==
There is no official version of the origin of the name, but there are some unofficial versions. One of them considers that they are descendants of high priest Maron, while another claims that the word comes from the ancient Greek verb "μαρμαίρω" which means "shine", something that is directly related to their traditional costumes which literally shine from the ornaments.

== Characteristics ==
It is a Thracian tribe with characteristics similar to those of the ancient Thracians. Even today it is a population group with strong internal cohesion. They have a common origin, historical origins, the same psychosynthesis and character, behavior, mentality, expression and pronunciation, customs and traditions and traditional clothing. Their society is dominated by the Thracian way of life, they are tied to their rich and genuine Thracian tradition, while until recently (around 1950) it was a completely closed society. It is characteristic that the vast majority of surnames end in "-idis" and "-oudis", which testifies to the close kinship ties. Up to the 1950s they did not exchange grooms and brides with other villages so "their race won't spoil".

== History ==
They live in Thrace (Evros) and these 13 villages intermarried exclusively among themselves until the late 1950s. Thrace celebrates a festival every year for them and with them. Some were settled in Western Thrace after 1922 when Eastern Thrace became part of Turkey after the Treaty of Lausanne (1923).

== The 13 villages of Marides ==
Ampelakia, Sitochori, Koufovouno, Poimeniko, Asvestades, Asproneri, Vrysika, Karoti, Neochori, Kyani, Sterna, Patagi, Mani
