= Therapeio =

Therapeio Θεραπειό
- Community
- Location within Greece
- Coordinates: 41°35′N 26°11′E
- Country: Greece
- Administrative region: East Macedonia and Thrace
- Regional unit: Evros
- Municipality: Orestiada
- Municipal unit: Trigono

Population (2021)
  - Community: 62
- Time zone: UTC+2 (EET)
  - Summer (DST): UTC+3 (EEST)

Therapeio (Greek: Θεραπειό) is a village in the northern part of the Evros regional unit in Greece. It is located near the border with Bulgaria, on the left bank of the river Ardas, between the villages Milia to the west, and Komara to the east. Therapeio is in the municipal unit of Trigono.

== Population ==
| Year | Population |
|---|---|
| 1991 | 203 |
| 2001 | 133 |
| 2011 | 86 |
| 2021 | 62 |

== See also ==
- List of settlements in the Evros regional unit
