= Ptelea, Evros =

Village in East Macedonia and Thrace, Greece

Ptelea Πτελέα
- Community
- Location within Greece
- Coordinates: 41°42′N 26°14′E
- Country: Greece
- Administrative region: East Macedonia and Thrace
- Regional unit: Evros
- Municipality: Orestiada
- Municipal unit: Trigono

Population (2021)
  - Community: 344
- Time zone: UTC+2 (EET)
  - Summer (DST): UTC+3 (EEST)

Ptelea (Greek: Πτελέα, before 1951: Φτελιά Ftelia) is a village in the northern part of the Evros regional unit, Greece. It is part of the municipal unit of Trigono. It is located on the right bank of the river Evros, where it forms the border with Bulgaria. It is bypassed by the Greek National Road 51/E85 (Alexandroupoli - Orestiada - Ormenio - Svilengrad). The town was formerly known as Karagatsoudi (Καραγατσούδι) and El-Karakas (Ελ-Καράκας), its Turkish name was Karaagaç. The nearest villages are Dikaia to its east, and Ormenio to its northwest.

== History ==
Ptelea was founded in 1924 by refugees from Eastern Thrace. In 1997 under the Capodistrian Plan, the community of Ptelea became part of the new municipality of Trigono with 11 other former communities. At the Kallikratis reform, it became part of the municipality of Orestiada.

== Population ==
Year	Population
1950s	1,000
1981	660
1991	569
2001	477
2011	441
2021	344

== Transport ==
=== Road ===
Ptelea is bypassed by the Greek National Road 51/European route E85 (Feres - Soufli - Orestiada - Ormenio), which continues across the border as the Bulgarian road 80 to Svilengrad.

=== Rail ===
The community is served by Ptelea railway station, the second most northerly railway station in Greece, after Ormenio. The station is served by Alexandroupoli–Svilengrad line.

== See also ==
- List of settlements in the Evros regional unit
