= Rigio =

Rigio Ρήγιο
- Settlement
- Location within Greece
- Coordinates: 41°23.50′N 26°35.19′E
- Country: Greece
- Administrative region: East Macedonia and Thrace
- Regional unit: Evros
- Municipality: Didymoteicho
- Municipal unit: Didymoteicho
- Community: Pythio

Population (2021)
  - Total: 54
- Time zone: UTC+2 (EET)
  - Summer (DST): UTC+3 (EEST)
- Postal code: 683 00
- Area code: 25530

Rigio (Greek: Ρήγιο) is a village in the eastern part of Didymoteicho municipality, Evros regional unit, Greece. It is 13 km east of the centre of Didymoteicho, on the right bank of the river Evros, where it forms the border with Turkey. Rigio belongs to the community of Pythio. The nearest villages are Pythio to the south, Asimenio to the west and Sofiko to the northwest. The town is populated by Arvanites.

== History ==
The village was created mainly by refugees who left Andrianoupolis reaching a population high in 1960-70.

== Transport ==
The Alexandroupolis–Svilengrad railway passes through the village, with a small unstaffed station to the east of the settlement, with a limited service to Dikaia and Alexandroupoli. All services are operated by Hellenic Train.

== Population ==
According to the latest population census, 10 years ago, Rigio had 100 permanent residents

== Sites of interest ==
- Ancient Tombs, 4th century BC
- The church of Saints Constantine and Helen (Inside is the icon that the refugees brought during the uprooting)

== See also ==
- List of settlements in the Evros regional unit
