= Kastanies =

Kastanies Καστανιές
- Community
- Location within Greece
- Coordinates: 41°39′N 26°29′E
- Country: Greece
- Administrative region: East Macedonia and Thrace
- Regional unit: Evros
- Municipality: Orestiada
- Municipal unit: Vyssa
- Elevation: 42 m (138 ft)

Population (2021)
  - Community: 698
- Time zone: UTC+2 (EET)
  - Summer (DST): UTC+3 (EEST)
- Postal code: 680 08

Kastanies (Greek: Καστανιές, meaning "chestnuts") is a town located in northern part of the regional unit of Evros, Greece, and is part of the municipal unit of Vyssa. It is situated at the border with Turkey.

== Geography ==
Kastanies is situated in the low plains near the confluence of the rivers Evros and Ardas, on the south bank of the Ardas. The area consists of farmlands, with some forests at the banks of the rivers. There are two road bridges and one railway bridge across the Ardas. Kastanies is 2.5 km south of Marasia, 4 km west of Karaağaç (Turkey), 5 km northeast of Rizia, 8 km northwest of Nea Vyssa, 8 km southwest of Edirne (Turkey) and 16 km north of Orestiada.

== Transport ==
The Greek National Road 51/E85, which connects Alexandroupoli with the Bulgarian border near Svilengrad passes west of Kastanies. A smaller road connecting the E85 with Edirne in Turkey by way of the border crossing Karaağaç passes through Kastanies.

Kastanies has a station on the Alexandroupoli–Svilengrad railway, served by trains from Alexandroupoli to Ormenio. The Otoyol 3 (O-3) to Istanbul begins a few km directly north of Kastanies. The O-3 is part of Asian Highway 1 to Tokyo and is also part of the E80 to Lisbon.

== Historical population ==
Year	Population
1981	1,186
1991	951
2001	1,251
2011	1,059
2021	698

== History ==
The village during the Ottoman administration was called "Çörekköy" and in the past had experienced great economic growth, from the cultivation of the broom. The Balkan Wars of 1912 and 1913 heavily affected Kastanies. In March 2018, at the Greek-Turkish border in Kastanies, two Greek officers were captured by a multi-member Turkish patrol. At the beginning of 2020, the village became widely known due to the incidents of the 2020 Greek-Turkish border crisis.

== Tourism ==
Kastanies is the last village on the Sultans Trail hiking path within the territory of Greece. There are 2 sections ready in Greece one coming from Svilengrad, Bulgaria via Ormenio and other coming from Ivaylovgrad, Bulgaria via Komara and following the river Ardas.

It's not permitted by the Turkish border guards to cross into Greece from Turkey on foot via the border crossing northeast of the village.

== See also ==
- List of settlements in the Evros regional unit
