= Albanians of Western Thrace =

Ethnic minority in Greece

The Albanians of Western Thrace form an ethnic minority in Greek Macedonia and Western Thrace along the border with Turkey. They speak the Northern Tosk subbranch of Tosk Albanian and are descendants of the Albanian population of Eastern Thrace who migrated during the Population exchange between Greece and Turkey in the 1920s.

They are known in Greece as Arvanites, a name applied to all groups of Albanian origin in Greece, but which primarily refers to the southern dialectological group of Arbëreshë. The Albanian-speakers of Western Thrace and Macedonia use the common Albanian self-appellation, Shqiptar when speaking their own language and refer to Albanians from Albania with the exonym ‘’Alvanos’’.

== History ==
During the Ottoman period, Albanian communities migrated towards today's European Turkey (Eastern Thrace), especially near Istanbul. Many Muslim Albanians achieved high office in Ottoman society and many of them, most notably the Köprülü family, became Grand Viziers of the Empire. The majority of the Albanian emigration came from northern Kosovo and the Korça region of Albania. Descendants of this immigrants would later play an important role in the National Renaissance of Albania. The number of Albanians that resided in the region is unknown, as statistical data of the Ottoman Empire were based on religious identification (millets). Thus, the Orthodox Albanians were part of the Rûm millet, while Muslims were categorised alongside Turks.

Among this population, Orthodox Albanians in Eastern Thrace resided in partly homogeneous communities, either villages or neighborhoods, and were mainly descendants of immigrants from the Korça region. At the conclusion of the Greco-Turkish War of 1919–1922, Greece and Turkey signed the Treaty of Lausanne, which included a population exchange between the two countries. The treaty used religion as the indicator of national affiliation, thus including populations without ethnic provisions, even Albanians, in the population exchange. Under this treaty the Muslims of Greece were exchanged with the Christians of Turkey, with an exception of the Muslims of Western Thrace and the Christians of Istanbul.

Under this provision, the Albanian-speaking Orthodox community of Eastern Thrace relocated to Western Thrace, where the refugees settled mainly in new villages. Today, this population lives in the same villages, but a part emigrated to bigger towns such as Thessaloniki and Athens.

== Distribution ==
The community settled in the villages of Tychero, Ardánio, Paradimí, Gemisti, Féres, Ántheia, Díkaia, N. Cheimónio, Kavýli, Tarsio, Kípoi, Kleisó, Péplos, Pýthio, Pyrólitho, Rígio, Sakkos, Thourio, Asimenio, Apalos, Lykofi, Sofikó, Paliouri, Ladi, Metaxades and Vrysika. In the 1951 census in Greece, Albanians formed around 3% of the total population in the Evros, and 0.4% in Xanthi regional unit. In the whole Western Thrace they counted 1.3% of the total population.

Population in Western Thrace per mother tongue, 1928 (official census)
| Prefectures | Total | Greek | Turkish | Slavic | Aromanian | Albanian | Pomak | Jewish | Other |
|---|---|---|---|---|---|---|---|---|---|
| Evros | 122,730 | 102,688 | 16,626 | 520 | 5 | 9 | 2 | 1,010 | 1,870 |
| Xanthi | 89,266 | 44,343 | 27,562 | 294 | 37 | 175 | 14,257 | 694 | 1,904 |
| Rodopi | 91,175 | 36,216 | 49,521 | 245 | 26 | 21 | 2,481 | 1,178 | 1,487 |
| Total | 303,171 | 183,247 | 93,709 | 1,059 | 68 | 205 | 16,740 | 2,882 | 5,261 |
| Total | | 60.4% | 30.9% | 0,3% | <0,1% | <0,1% | 5.5% | 1% | 1,7% |

Population in Western Thrace per mother tongne, 1951 (official census)
| Prefectures | Total | Greek | Turkish | Slavic | Aromanian | Albanian | Pomak | Jewish | Other |
|---|---|---|---|---|---|---|---|---|---|
| Evros | 141,340 | 126,229 | 10,061 | 0 | 18 | 4,121 | 112 | 18 | 781 |
| Xanthi | 89,891 | 46,147 | 26,010 | 8 | 5 | 354 | 16,926 | 2 | 439 |
| Rodopi | 105,723 | 45,505 | 57,785 | 0 | 2 | 5 | 1,628 | 8 | 790 |
| Total | 336,954 | 217,881 | 93,856 | 8 | 25 | 4,480 | 18,666 | 28 | 2,010 |
| Total | | 64,7% | 27,9% | <0,1% | <0,1% | 1,3% | 5,5% | <0,1% | 1,7% |

In the 1990s, the European Commission's Euromosaic Project documenting minority languages recorded the geographic distribution of Albanian speakers in northeastern Greece. Albanian speakers were located in some homogeneous and several mixed villages:

| Prefecture | No. of villages (Euromosaic) |
|---|---|
| Evros | 4 homogeneous and 14 mixed |
| Rhodope | 1 |
| Xanthi | 3 |
| Serres | 5 |
| Thessaloniki | 1 |
| Kilkis | 1 |

== See also ==
- Minorities in Greece
- Albanians in Greece
