= Elaia, Evros =

Elaia Ελαία
- Community
- Location within Greece
- Coordinates: 41°37′N 26°19′E
- Country: Greece
- Administrative region: East Macedonia and Thrace
- Regional unit: Evros
- Municipality: Orestiada
- Municipal unit: Trigono

Population (2021)
  - Community: 315
- Time zone: UTC+2 (EET)
  - Summer (DST): UTC+3 (EEST)

Elaia (Greek: Ελαία meaning olives, Bulgarian: Делиелес - Delieles) is a village in the northern part of the Evros regional unit, Greece. Elaia is in the municipal unit of Trigono. The village is located on the left bank of the river Arda. The nearest villages are Plati to its northeast and Fylakio to its south.

== Population ==
Year	Population
1981	669
1991	611
2001	532
2011	428
2021	315

== History ==
The village was founded during the Ottoman period by the Turks, its population was Bulgarian and Turkish. After its annexation to Greece, many Greeks from east of the Evros river began to inhabit the area.

== See also ==
- List of settlements in the Evros regional unit
