= Poimeniko =

Village in Thrace, Greece

Poimeniko Ποιμενικό
- Community
- Location within Greece
- Coordinates: 41°27′43″N 26°23′02″E
- Country: Greece
- Administrative region: Eastern Macedonia and Thrace
- Regional unit: Evros
- Municipality: Didymoteicho
- Municipal unit: Didymoteicho

Population (2021)
  - Community: 225
- Time zone: UTC+2 (EET)
  - Summer (DST): UTC+3 (EEST)

Poimeniko (Greek: Ποιμενικό) is a village and a community in the municipality of Didymoteicho in the eastcentral Evros regional unit, Greece. It is 2 km east of Sitochori, 3 km southwest of Ampelakia, 13 km southwest of Orestiada and 15 km northwest of Didymoteicho town centre. In 2021 its population was 225. Its elevation is 120 m. It is situated between farmlands, in an area with low hills.

== Population ==
Year	Population
1981	514
1991	510
2001	551
2011	343
2021	225

== See also ==
- List of settlements in the Evros regional unit
