= Pentalofos, Evros =

Pentalofos Πεντάλοφος
- Community
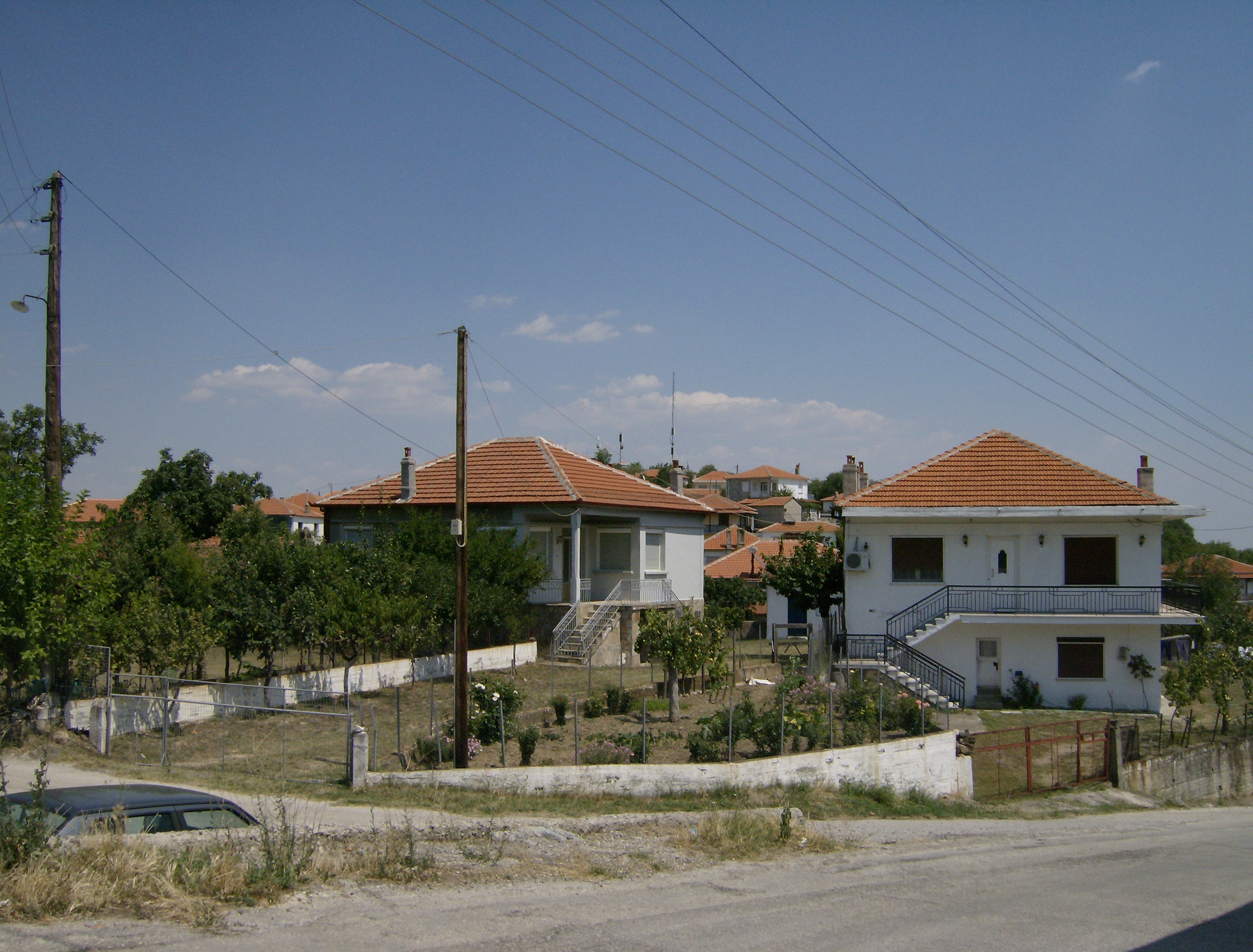

- Location within Greece
- Coordinates: 41°39′N 26°11′E
- Country: Greece
- Administrative region: East Macedonia and Thrace
- Regional unit: Evros
- Municipality: Orestiada
- Municipal unit: Trigono

Population (2021)
  - Community: 344
- Time zone: UTC+2 (EET)
  - Summer (DST): UTC+3 (EEST)

Pentalofos (Greek: Πεντάλοφος meaning the five hills) is a village in the northern part of the Evros regional unit in Greece. Pentalofos is in the municipal unit of Trigono. It is close to the border with Bulgaria. The nearest larger village is Ormenio to its north.

== Population ==
Year	Population
1981	885
1991	931
2001	665
2011	510
2021	344

== See also ==
- List of settlements in the Evros regional unit
