= Rizia =

Village in Western Thrace, Greece

Rizia Ρίζια
- Community
- Location within Greece
- Coordinates: 41°37′N 26°25′E
- Country: Greece
- Administrative region: East Macedonia and Thrace
- Regional unit: Evros
- Municipality: Orestiada
- Municipal unit: Vyssa

Population (2021)
  - Community: 997
- Time zone: UTC+2 (EET)
  - Summer (DST): UTC+3 (EEST)

Rizia (Greek: Ρίζια) is a village in the municipal unit of Vyssa in the northern part of the Evros regional unit in Greece. It is situated on the right bank of the river Ardas. The nearest large village is Kastanies to its northeast, on the Turkish border.

== Population ==
| Year | Population |
|---|---|
| 1981 | 2124 |
| 1991 | 1894 |
| 2001 | 1432 |
| 2011 | 1103 |
| 2021 | 987 |

== History ==
Its name during the Ottoman rule was Dujaros (Дуджарос - Dudzharos in Bulgarian). After a brief period of Bulgarian rule between 1913 and 1919, it became part of Greece. As a result, its Bulgarian and Turkish population was exchanged with Greek refugees, mainly from today's Turkey.

== Notable people ==
- Giorgos Batatoudis: entrepreneur, PAOK's former owner
- Dimitris Nalitzis, International football player

== See also ==
- List of settlements in the Evros regional unit
