= List of settlements in the Evros regional unit =

This is a list of settlements in the Evros regional unit, Greece:

- Aisymi
- Alepochori
- Alexandroupoli
- Amorio
- Ampelakia
- Antheia
- Ardani
- Arzos
- Asimenio
- Asproneri
- Asvestades
- Avas
- Avdella
- Chandras
- Dadia
- Didymoteicho
- Dikaia
- Doriko
- Doriskos
- Doxa
- Elafochori
- Elaia
- Ellinochori
- Feres
- Fylakio
- Fylakto
- Isaakio
- Karoti
- Kastanies
- Kavisos
- Kavyli
- Kirki
- Komara
- Kornofolea
- Koufovouno
- Kyani
- Kyprinos
- Kyriaki
- Ladi
- Lagyna
- Lavara
- Lefkimmi
- Loutros
- Lykofos
- Lyra
- Makri
- Mandra
- Mani
- Marasia
- Mavrokklisi
- Megali Doxipara
- Metaxades
- Mikro Dereio
- Milia
- Nea Vyssa
- Neo Cheimonio
- Neochori
- Nipsa
- Orestiada
- Ormenio
- Paliouri
- Pentalofos
- Peplos
- Petrades
- Petrota
- Plati
- Poimeniko
- Polia
- Prangio
- Protokklisi
- Provatonas
- Ptelea
- Pylaia
- Pythio
- Rigio
- Rizia
- Sitochori
- Sofiko
- Soufli
- Spilaio
- Sterna
- Sykorrachi
- Therapeio
- Thourio
- Trifylli
- Tychero
- Valtos
- Vrysika
- Zoni

== By municipality ==
Samothrace (no subdivisions)

== Abandoned villages ==
Agrafiotika, Aliki, Amfithea, Amygdalia, Apidochori, Archondiko, Asia, Chaldini, Chandakas, Chloi, Daskaleio, Delitio, Drepano, Drymos, Dymi, Fere Kalyva, Gavria, Iana, Katsika, Kissos, Kitrinopetra, Kliso, Ktima, Mavropetra, Megali Kavissos, Melopetra, Mikraki, Nea Vrysi, Nefeli, Ourania, Palaistra, Patara, Pessani, Polyvlasto, Potamos, Profitis Ilias, Pyrolithos, Samaras, Sanidochori, Sarpidonia, Spano, Tarsio, Theiafi, Treis Myloi, Triada, Tsaliki, Vafeio, Vergi, Vyrini, Xirodendro, Yalia.

== See also ==
- List of towns and villages in Greece
