= Chandras =

Chandras Χανδράς
- Community
- Location within Greece
- Coordinates: 41°31′N 26°18′E
- Country: Greece
- Administrative region: East Macedonia and Thrace
- Regional unit: Evros
- Municipality: Orestiada
- Municipal unit: Orestiada

Population (2021)
  - Community: 109
- Time zone: UTC+2 (EET)
  - Summer (DST): UTC+3 (EEST)
- Vehicle registration: OP

Chandras (Greek: Χανδράς) is a village in the municipality of Orestiada in the northern part of the Evros regional unit in Greece. It is situated in the low hills between the rivers Ardas and Erythropotamos, about 20 km west of the centre of Orestiada. The nearest larger villages are Megali Doxipara to its southwest and Valtos to its northeast.

== Population ==
Year	Population
1981	322
1991	287
2001	223
2011	209
2021	109

== History ==
Before 1913 it was ruled by the Ottomans. After a brief period of Bulgarian rule between 1913 and 1919, it became part of Greece. As a result, its Bulgarian and Turkish population was exchanged with Greek refugees, mainly from today's Turkey.

== See also ==
- List of settlements in the Evros regional unit
