= Megali Doxipara =

Megali Doxipara Μεγάλη Δοξιπάρα
- Community
- Location within Greece
- Coordinates: 41°30′N 26°17′E
- Country: Greece
- Administrative region: East Macedonia and Thrace
- Regional unit: Evros
- Municipality: Orestiada
- Municipal unit: Orestiada

Population (2021)
  - Community: 220
- Time zone: UTC+2 (EET)
  - Summer (DST): UTC+3 (EEST)
- Vehicle registration: OP

Megali Doxipara (Greek: Μεγάλη Δοξιπάρα) is a village in the municipality of Orestiada in the northern part of the Evros regional unit in Greece. Megali Doxipara is located about 23 km west of the centre of Orestiada. The nearest villages are Doxa to the south, Chandras to the east and Zoni to the west.

== Population ==
Year	Population
1981	550
1991	467
2001	410
2011	302
2021	220

== History ==
Before 1913 it was ruled by the Ottomans. The village was known as Dougantzi then. After a brief period of Bulgarian rule between 1913 and 1919, it became part of Greece. As a result, its Bulgarian and Turkish population was exchanged with Greek refugees, mainly from today's Turkey.

== See also ==
- List of settlements in the Evros regional unit
