= Sterna, Evros =

Sterna Στέρνα
- Community
- Location within Greece
- Coordinates: 41°34′N 26°28′E
- Country: Greece
- Administrative region: East Macedonia and Thrace
- Regional unit: Evros
- Municipality: Orestiada
- Municipal unit: Vyssa

Population (2021)
  - Community: 481
- Time zone: UTC+2 (EET)
  - Summer (DST): UTC+3 (EEST)

Sterna (Greek: Στέρνα) is a settlement in the Evros regional unit of Greece. It is located around 9 kilometers west of Nea Vyssa and northwest of Orestiada, on low hills between the rivers Evros and Arda.

== Population ==
Year	Population
1981	1,015
1991	1,008
2001	867
2011	621
2021	481

== History ==
Sterna was ruled by the Ottoman Empire until the Balkan Wars of 1913, when it joined Bulgaria. After the Greco-Turkish War (1919-1922) it was ceded to Greece.

== See also ==
- List of settlements in the Evros regional unit
