= II-80 road (Bulgaria) =

Road in Bulgaria

Republic Road I-80
- Републикански път I-80

Route information
- Length: 6.5 km (4.0 mi)

Major junctions
- From: Km 99.3 of Maritsa motorway near Svilengrad
- To: Border with Greece (near Ormenio)

Location
- Country: Bulgaria

Highway system
- Highways in Bulgaria

Republican Road II-80 (Bulgarian: Републикански път II-80), formerly numbered as the II-88 and II-89 roads, is a four-lane 2nd class road in southeastern Bulgaria, running entirely through the territory of Svilengrad Municipality of Haskovo Province. With a length of 6.5 km, it is the second shortest second class road in the country, after the 6.0 km II-17 road. It has four lanes throughout its entire length, and is part of European route E85.

The road starts at Km 99.3 of the Maritsa motorway northwest of the town of Svilengrad and proceeds in direction southwest, crossing the river Maritsa and reaching Km 366.8 of the first class I-8 road at Kapitan Petko Voyvoda neighbourhood of Svilengrad. It then runs south to the border with Greece near Ormenio, where it continues as the Kastanies–Ormenio and EO51 national roads: border controls with Greece were abolished on 1 January 2025, when Bulgaria fully joined the Schengen Area.
