= Spilaio =

Spilaio Σπήλαιο
- Community
- Location within Greece
- Coordinates: 41°39′N 26°19′E
- Country: Greece
- Administrative region: East Macedonia and Thrace
- Regional unit: Evros
- Municipality: Orestiada
- Municipal unit: Trigono

Population (2021)
  - Community: 230
- Time zone: UTC+2 (EET)
  - Summer (DST): UTC+3 (EEST)

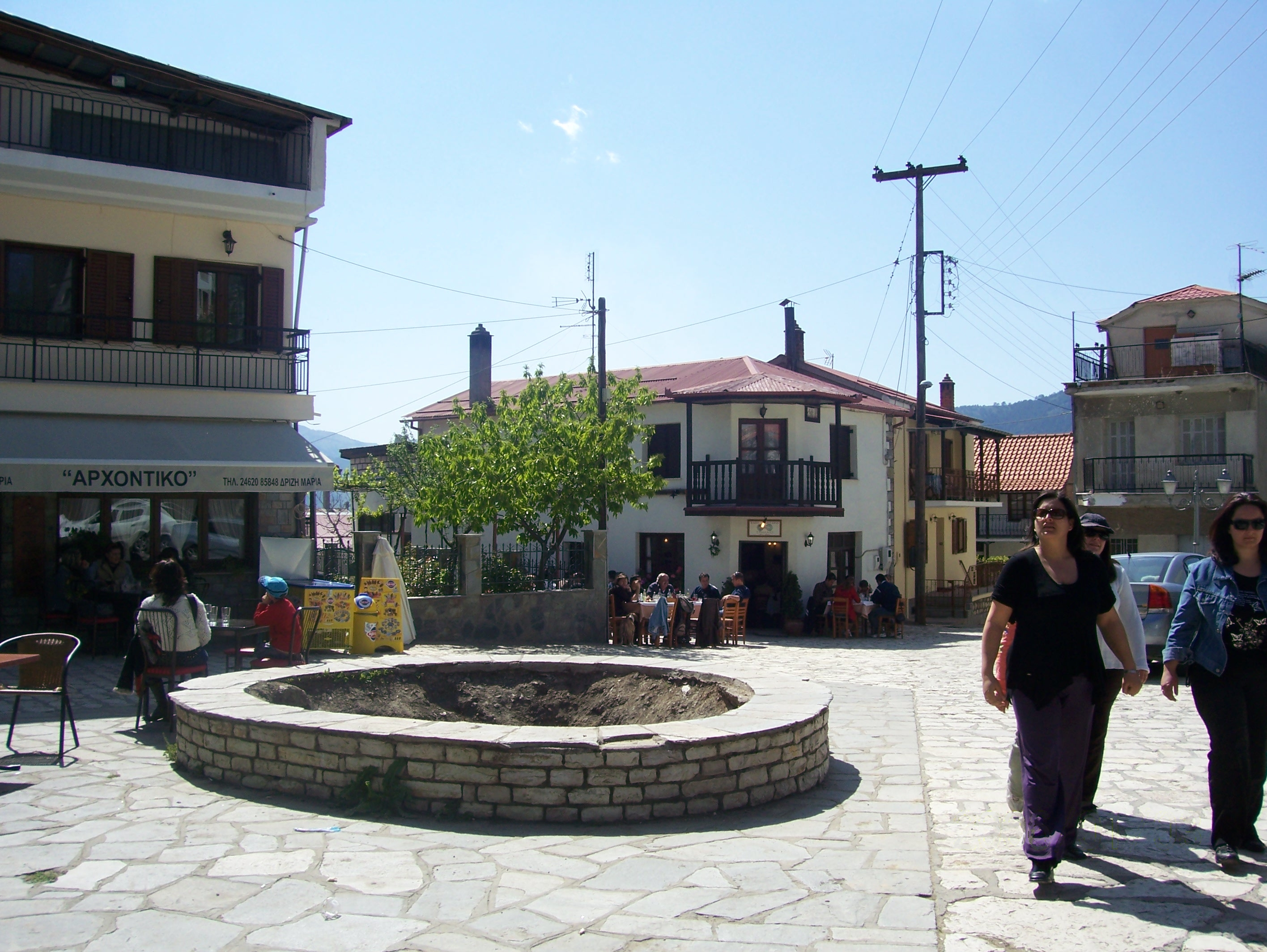

Spilaio (Greek: Σπήλαιο meaning cave) is a village in the northern part of the Evros regional unit in Greece. It is in the municipal unit of Trigono. It is in a relatively flat, agricultural area. The nearest larger villages are Dikaia to its north, and Plati to its southeast.

== Population ==
Year	Population
1981	603
1991	590
2001	443
2011	334
2021	230

== History ==
The village was founded by the Ottoman Turks, it was known as İspitli then. After a brief period of Bulgarian rule between 1913 and 1919, it became part of Greece. As a result its Bulgarian and Turkish population was exchanged with Greek refugees, mainly from today's Turkey.

== See also ==
- List of settlements in the Evros regional unit
