= Plati, Evros =

Plati Πλάτη
- Community
- Location within Greece
- Coordinates: 41°38′N 26°20′E
- Country: Greece
- Administrative region: East Macedonia and Thrace
- Regional unit: Evros
- Municipality: Orestiada
- Municipal unit: Trigono

Population (2021)
  - Community: 409
- Time zone: UTC+2 (EET)
  - Summer (DST): UTC+3 (EEST)

Plati (Greek: Πλάτη) is a village in the northern part of the Evros regional unit in Greece. It is part of the municipal unit Trigono. Plati is located on the left bank of the river Ardas, between the villages Elaia to the west and Arzos to the east.

== Population ==
Year	Population
1981	599
1991	603
2001	601
2011	655
2021	409

== History ==
The village was founded by the Ottoman Turks, it was known as Sadirli then. After a brief period of Bulgarian rule between 1913 and 1919, it became part of Greece. As a result, its Bulgarian and Turkish population was exchanged with Greek refugees, mainly from today's Turkey.

== See also ==
- List of settlements in the Evros regional unit
