= Koufovouno =

Koufovouno Κουφόβουνο
- Community
- Location within Greece
- Coordinates: 41°21.3′N 26°26.1′E
- Country: Greece
- Administrative region: East Macedonia and Thrace
- Regional unit: Evros
- Municipality: Didymoteicho
- Municipal unit: Didymoteicho

Population (2021)
  - Community: 599
- Time zone: UTC+2 (EET)
  - Summer (DST): UTC+3 (EEST)

Koufovouno (Greek: Κουφόβουνο) is a settlement in the municipality of Didymoteicho in the northern Evros regional unit, Greece. It is situated on a low hill near the right bank of the river Erythropotamos, at 70 m elevation. In 2021 its population was 599. It is 3 km southwest of Ellinochori, 5 km southeast of Kyani, and 5 km west of Didymoteicho.

== History ==
During the Ottoman period, Koufovouno was inhabited mostly by Bulgarians and Turks. It was occupied by the Greeks at the end of World War I and it became a part of Greece. Its current population is mostly descendants of Greek refugees from Eastern Thrace.

== Population ==
| Year | Population |
|---|---|
| 1981 | 1,201 |
| 1991 | 1,287 |
| 2001 | 958 |
| 2011 | 629 |
| 2021 | 599 |

== See also ==
- List of settlements in the Evros regional unit
