= Zoni, Evros =

Zoni Ζώνη
- Community
- Location within Greece
- Coordinates: 41°30′N 26°13′E
- Country: Greece
- Administrative region: East Macedonia and Thrace
- Regional unit: Evros
- Municipality: Orestiada
- Municipal unit: Kyprinos

Population (2021)
  - Community: 294
- Time zone: UTC+2 (EET)
  - Summer (DST): UTC+3 (EEST)
- Vehicle registration: EB

Zoni (Greek: Ζώνη, Turkish: Çavuşkoy) is a village in the northern part of the Evros regional unit in Greece. Zoni is in the municipal unit of Kyprinos. In 2021 its population was 294 for the municipal community, including the villages Chelidona and Mikra Doxipara. It is located close to the border with Bulgaria, south of Kyprinos village, and east of Ivaylovgrad, Bulgaria. Zoni is on the Greek National Road 53 (Alexandroupoli - Aisymi - Mikro Dereio - Kyprinos - Ormenio).

== Population ==
Year	Village population	Community population
1981	-	1,328
1991	310	-
2001	238	811
2011	150	449
2021	103	294

== History ==
The village was founded by the Ottoman Turks. Its inhabitants were 3/4 Bulgarian and 1/4 Turkish before the village was annexed by Greece from Bulgaria in 1920 and before the aftermath of the Greco-Turkish War (1919-1922), when Greek refugees from Eastern Thrace and Asia Minor settled into the village. Its Turkish name was changed to the current Zoni.

== See also ==
- List of settlements in the Evros regional unit
