= Myrto Kostika =

Greek architect (1931–2016)

Myrto Parla Kostika (1931–2016) was a Greek architect known for her contributions to the development of modern architecture in Greece. Her work included educational and research buildings, tourism infrastructures and private residences, especially on the island of Sifnos. As a freelancer she did not publish her projects systematically.

She was the elder of the two children in her family. Her only sibling was her younger brother, Kostas Parlas, who later established himself as a prominent journalist.

Parla Kostika studied at the American Junior College for Girls from 1945 to 1951. She continued her education at the School of Architecture of the National Technical University of Athens (NTUA) between 1951 and 1956. Her teachers – Dimitris Pikionis, Nikos Hatzikyriakos-Gikas, Nikos Engonopoulos, Panagiotis Michelis, Kyprianos Biris and Costas Kitsikis – and their teachings emphasized the search for a modern Greek architectural identity that would reconcile contemporary design with traditional forms and materials.

In 1956 during her internship, she teamed up with her professor Dimitris Pikionis at the reconstruction around the Acropolis of Athens before eventually moving to the United States of America along with her husband Thanasis Kostikas.

From 1957 to 1961, she pursued postgraduate studies at the Illinois Institute of Technology (IIT) in Chicago. There she studied with well-known figures of the modern movement, including Ludwig Mies van der Rohe, Ludwig Hilberseimer and James Speyer.

In 1960 with her Thesis Athens Replanned she finished her postgraduate studies. Later on with the birth of her daughter she returned to Greece . During her first year back she collaborates with major architectural firms, including those of Doxiadis, Valsamakis, Koulermos and Kontargyris before establishing her own firm with her closest work associates being Katerina Papadopoulou and Xrisi Petridou.

She remained active up until the 90s and died on 13 June 2016 at the age of 85.

== Her works ==
=== 1960s ===
- 1963 Hotel G. Stamou
- 1963 Switches & lights Factory of Linter Hellas
- 1965–1967 Junior & Senior high school Vahlioti Collaboration with: I. Gounaropoulo
- 1965 Laboratories and Factory Storage units of SIEMENS ΕΛΛΑΣ
- 1965 Hotel Complex «Ariadni»
- 1965 Hotel K. Mari
- 1968 Hotel E. & N. Kalogeropoulou

=== 1970s & 1980s ===
- 1970 Electrical Laboratories Building , National Centre of Scientific Research "Demokritos"
- 1970 Hotel S.A. «Pelasgia Hellas»
- 1970 Hotel complex S.A. EXTE
- 1970–1988 Apartments at Thessalonica , Paros, Sifnos, Attica
- 1970–1989 Apartment at the Patisia neighbourhood collaboration with K.Tsokli
- 1970–1989 Shipping offices Patera
- 1970–1989 Farmacy I. Depasta
- 1970–1989 COLGATE office of Athens
- 1971–1976 University Dormitory complex A' and Campus of Ioannina, in collaboration with the firm of Valsamakis
- 1971-1976 University Dormitory complex Β΄, in collaboration with the firm of Valsamakis
- 1971–1976 Expansion of the University Dormitory complex A' and Campus of Ioannina
- 1974 Health Station
- 1974–1975 Computer Science Building, University of Ioannina
- 1974–1975 Four lecture hall buildings for specialized teaching, School of Science, University of Ioannina. in collaboration with D. Kontargiri - Συνεργασία με Δ. Κονταργύρη – Architectural Design firm (19/57)
- 1975 Hotel B' category at Glyfada
- 1980 Hotel Oikonomaki
- 1981 Hotel complex S.A. Alexandri
- 1983 Nursery and Kindergarten, Workers' Housing Organization, Patra.
- 1983 Working Girls' Center, OAED, Patras.
- 1983 General Hospital of Northern Attica, Penteli (Preliminary Study: Neurology, Psychiatry, Pediatric & Adult Buildings
- 1987 Addition of a Floor, National Hellenic Research Foundation Building, Athens.
- 1987/9–1994 Building complex for the Foundation for Research & Technology – Hellas
- 1988 Technical and Vocational Training Center of OAED, Orestiada

=== 1990s & 2000s ===
- 1992–1994 Office Building of the 'Alumil' Company, Kilkis in collaboration with: Th. Bikakis, E. Karistinou)
- 1992–2000 Alumil Company Industrial Facilities, Kilkis: Electrostatic Coating and Processing Plant, Wireworking – Component Production Building, Production Lines, Warehouses, and Logistics, in Collaboration with: N. Rodokanakis, E. Karistinou, A. Papapostolou)
- 1992–2000 "Alumil Company Exhibition Spaces." in Collaboration with: N. Rodokanakis, A. Papapostolou
- 1994 Implementation Study of the Buildings of Zakynthos General Hospital , in collaboration with: N. Rodokanakis, Design Team: A. Papapostolou, M. Rokas, G. Papageorgiou; Construction: ATTIKAT S.A.
- 1994–1996 Student Dormitory Complex, University of Crete, Heraklion Campus, in collaboration with P. Koukourakis & Associates Ltd; in collaboration with N. Rodokanakis, M. Rokas; Construction: GNOMON S.A. (PPP)
- 1994–1996 Student Dormitory Complex, University of Crete, Heraklion Campus, in collaboration with P. Koukourakis & Associates Ltd; in collaboration with N. Rodokanakis, M. Rokas; Construction: GNOMON S.A. (PPP)
- 1994–1996 Chemistry Laboratory, University of Crete, Heraklion Campus, in collaboration with P. Koukourakis & Associates Ltd; in collaboration with N. Rodokanakis, M. Rokas; Construction: GNOMON S.A. (PPP)
- 1995 Extension of Alumil Headquarters, Kilkis, in collaboration with N. Rodokanakis.
- 1995–1998 Interior Design of Apartments: Athens (Kolonaki), Thessaloniki (Kalamaria), Sifnos.
- 1996 New Administration Building of Alumil, Kilkis, in collaboration with N. Rodokanakis
