= Avas, Greece =

Avas Άβας
- Community
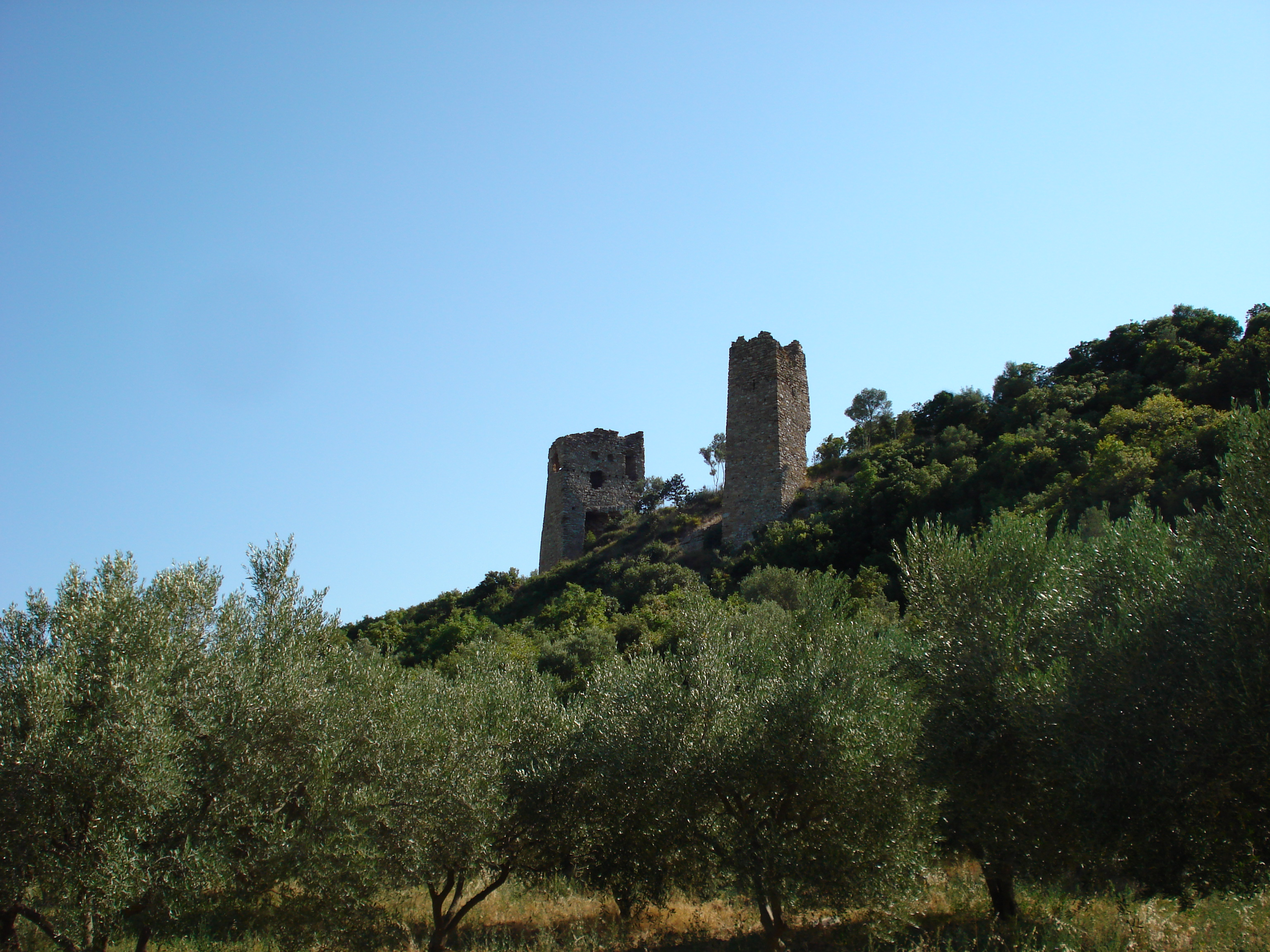

- Location within Greece
- Coordinates: 40°56′N 25°55′E
- Country: Greece
- Administrative region: East Macedonia and Thrace
- Regional unit: Evros
- Municipality: Alexandroupoli
- Municipal unit: Alexandroupoli

Population (2021)
  - Community: 486
- Time zone: UTC+2 (EET)
  - Summer (DST): UTC+3 (EEST)
- Vehicle registration: EB

Avas or Avantas (Greek, modern: Άβαντας, katharevousa: Άβας, Bulgarian: Дервент, Turkish: Dervent) is a village in the southern part of the Evros regional unit, Greece. Avantas is located 10 km north of Alexandroupoli. It is on the Greek National Road 53 (Alexandroupoli - Mikro Dereio - Ormenio), between Alexandroupoli to the south and Aisymi to the north. In 2021 its population was 486.

== Population ==
Year	Population
1912	about 400
1981	555
1991	516
2001	497
2011	527
2021	486

== History ==
The village was founded by the Ottoman Turks. Its inhabitants were 3/4 Bulgarian and 1/4 Turkish before the Balkan Wars and the Greco-Turkish War (1919-1922). According to professor Lyubomir Miletich, the 1912 population contained 320 Bulgarian families. Refugees from east of the Evros river and from Asia Minor arrived into the village. Its name was changed from the Turkish Dervent to the current Avas.

== People ==
- Mitro Karabeljata, Revolutionary leader and strategist of Tane Nikolov

== See also ==
- List of settlements in the Evros regional unit
