= Milia, Evros =

Milia Μηλιά
- Community
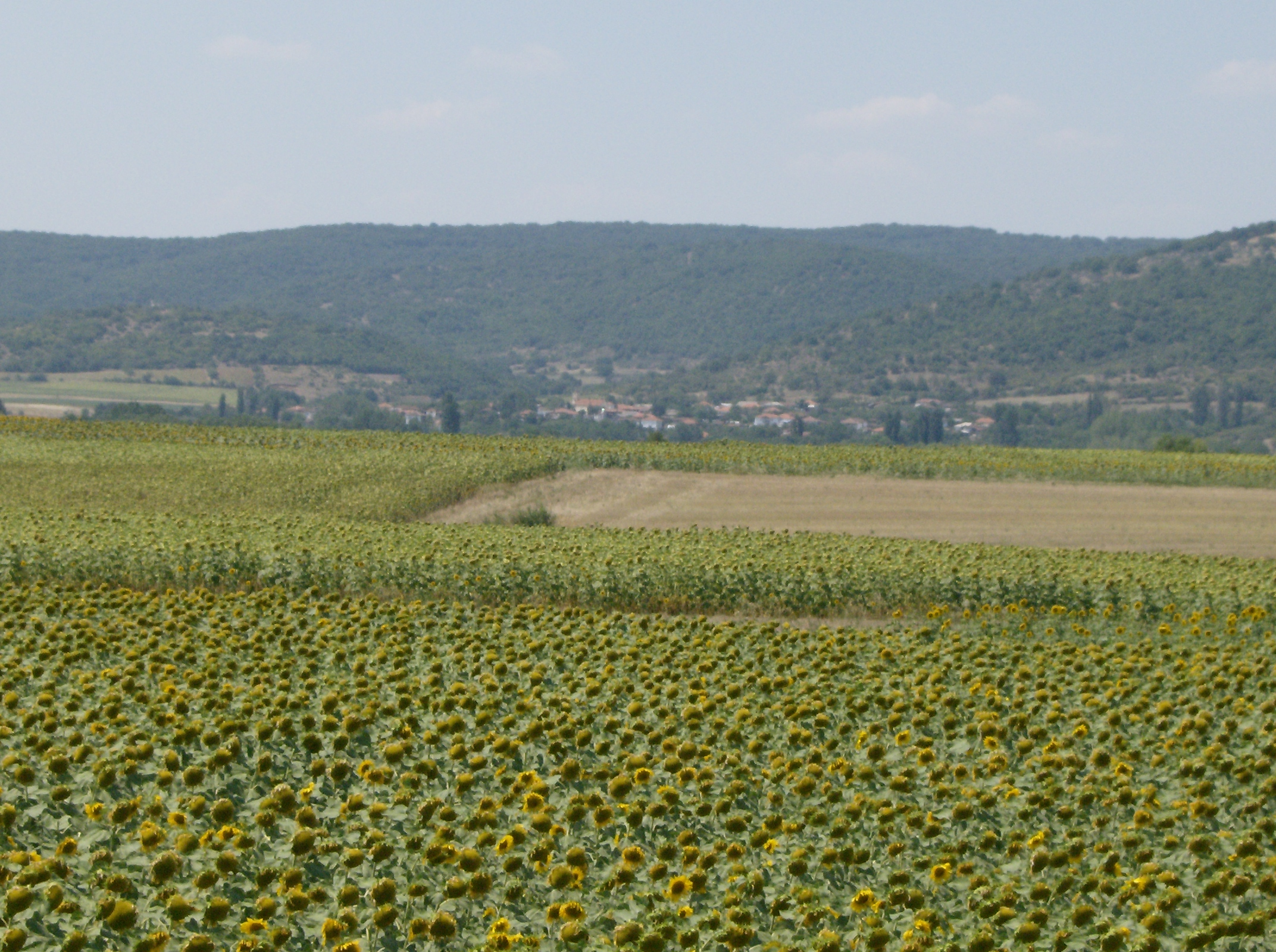

- Location within Greece
- Coordinates: 41°34′N 26°10′E
- Country: Greece
- Administrative region: East Macedonia and Thrace
- Regional unit: Evros
- Municipality: Orestiada
- Municipal unit: Trigono

Population (2021)
  - Community: 28
- Time zone: UTC+2 (EET)
  - Summer (DST): UTC+3 (EEST)

Milia (Greek: Μηλιά, also Μηλέα - Milea) is a village in the northern part of the Evros regional unit, Greece. It is in the municipal unit of Trigono. It is on the left bank of the river Arda, and on the border with Bulgaria. The nearest larger places are Kyprinos to its east, and Ivaylovgrad (Bulgaria) to its southwest.

== Population ==
Year	Population
1991	200
2001	104
2011	54
2021	28

== History ==
The village was founded by the Ottoman Turks, and was known as Bektaşlı then. After a brief period of Bulgarian rule between 1913 and 1919, it became part of Greece. As a result its Bulgarian and Turkish population was exchanged with Greek refugees, mainly from today's Turkey.

== See also ==
- List of settlements in the Evros regional unit
