= Thourio =

Thourio (Greek: Θούριο) may refer to:

- Thourio, Boeotia, a village in Boeotia, Greece
- Thourio, Evros, a village in the Evros regional unit, Greece

== See also ==
- Thourios, a famous poem written by Rigas Feraios
- Thouria, a village in Messenia, Greece
