= Neo Cheimonio =

Neo Cheimonio Νέο Χειμώνιο
- Community
- Location within Greece
- Coordinates: 41°27′N 26°33′E
- Country: Greece
- Administrative region: East Macedonia and Thrace
- Regional unit: Evros
- Municipality: Orestiada
- Municipal unit: Orestiada

Population (2021)
  - Community: 335
- Time zone: UTC+2 (EET)
  - Summer (DST): UTC+3 (EEST)
- Vehicle registration: OP

Neo Cheimonio (Greek: Νέο Χειμώνιο) is a village in the municipality of Orestiada in the northern part of the Evros regional unit in Greece. It is 6 km south of the centre of Orestiada. Neo Cheimonio is situated on the Greek National Road 51 (Feres - Soufli - Didymoteicho - Orestiada - Ormenio - Svilengrad), and has a station on the Ormenio - Didymoteicho railway. It is about 5 km west of the river Evros, that forms the border with Turkey here. The nearest village is Thourio to the south. It was annexed by Greece in 1920, prior it was ruled by the Ottomans.

== Population ==
Year	Population
1981	650
1991	606
2001	621
2011	444
2021	335

The town is populated by Arvanites.

== See also ==
- List of settlements in the Evros regional unit
