= Arzos =

Arzos Άρζος
- Community
- Location within Greece
- Coordinates: 41°38′N 26°22′E
- Country: Greece
- Administrative region: East Macedonia and Thrace
- Regional unit: Evros
- Municipality: Orestiada
- Municipal unit: Trigono

Population (2021)
  - Community: 259
- Time zone: UTC+2 (EET)
  - Summer (DST): UTC+3 (EEST)

Arzos (Greek: Άρζος, Turkish: Kulakli) is a village in the northern part of the Evros regional unit in Greece. It is situated on the left bank of the river Ardas, about 20 km northwest of Orestiada. Arzos is part of the municipal unit of Trigono. In 2021 its population was 259 for the municipal community, which includes the village Kanadas.

== Population ==
Year	Village population	Community population
1981	604	-
1991	267	-
2001	209	433
2011	237	433
2021	127	259

== History ==
A tomb found near Arzos dates back to the 4th century BC. Arzos was ruled by the Ottoman Empire until the Balkan Wars of 1913. After a brief period of Bulgarian rule between 1913 and 1919, it became part of Greece. As a result its Bulgarian and Turkish population was exchanged with Greek refugees, mainly from today's Turkey.

== See also ==
- List of settlements in the Evros regional unit
