= Asimenio =

Asimenio Ασημένιο
- Community
- Location within Greece
- Coordinates: 41°24′N 26°34′E
- Country: Greece
- Administrative region: East Macedonia and Thrace
- Regional unit: Evros
- Municipality: Didymoteicho
- Municipal unit: Didymoteicho
- Elevation: 50 m (160 ft)

Population (2021)
  - Community: 248
- Time zone: UTC+2 (EET)
  - Summer (DST): UTC+3 (EEST)
- Postal code: 683 00
- Vehicle registration: EB

Asimenio (Greek: Ασημένιο) is a village in the municipality of Didymoteicho in the northern part of the Evros regional unit in Greece. It is about 8 km northeast of the centre of Didymoteicho. It is bypassed by the Greek National Road 51 (Alexandroupoli - Didymoteicho - Orestiada - Ormenio). The nearest larger villages are Sofiko to the north, and Pythio to the southeast.

== Population ==
Year	Population
1981	697
1991	498
2001	424
2011	334
2021	248

The village has historically also been settled by Arvanites.

== See also ==
- List of settlements in the Evros regional unit
