= Ampelakia, Evros =

Ampelakia Αμπελάκια
- Community
- Location within Greece
- Coordinates: 41°29′N 26°24′E
- Country: Greece
- Administrative region: East Macedonia and Thrace
- Regional unit: Evros
- Municipality: Orestiada
- Municipal unit: Orestiada

Population (2021)
  - Community: 324
- Time zone: UTC+2 (EET)
  - Summer (DST): UTC+3 (EEST)
- Vehicle registration: OP

Ampelakia (Greek: Αμπελάκια meaning vineyards) is a village in the municipality of Orestiada in the northern part of the Evros regional unit in Greece. Its population was 324 in 2021. Ampelakia is located about 12 km west of central Orestiada. The nearest larger village is Neochori to its northeast.

== Population ==
Year	Population
1981	813
1991	675
2001	574
2011	470
2021	324

== History ==
Its name during the Ottoman period was Kouliaklis. Its population was made up of Bulgarians, Turks and Greeks. After a brief period of Bulgarian rule between 1913 and 1919, it became part of Greece. As a result, its Bulgarian and Turkish population was exchanged with Greek refugees, mainly from today's Turkey.

== See also ==
- List of settlements in the Evros regional unit
