= Asvestades =

Asvestades Ασβεστάδες
- Community
- Location within Greece
- Coordinates: 41°21′N 26°21′E
- Country: Greece
- Administrative region: East Macedonia and Thrace
- Regional unit: Evros
- Municipality: Didymoteicho
- Municipal unit: Didymoteicho

Population (2021)
  - Community: 148
- Time zone: UTC+2 (EET)
  - Summer (DST): UTC+3 (EEST)

Asvestades (Greek: Ασβεστάδες) is a village in the municipality of Didymoteicho in the northern part of the Evros regional unit in Greece. It is 14 km west of the centre of Didymoteicho, in the hills south of the river Erythropotamos. It was known as "Kireççiler" during Ottoman rule. It was annexed to Greece in 1920. The nearest larger village is Kyani to its northeast.

== Population ==
Year	Population
1991	367
2001	302
2011	192
2021	148

== See also ==
- List of settlements in the Evros regional unit
