= Antheia, Evros =

Anthia Άνθεια
- Community
- Location within Greece
- Coordinates: 40°52′N 25°59′E
- Country: Greece
- Administrative region: East Macedonia and Thrace
- Regional unit: Evros
- Municipality: Alexandroupoli
- Municipal unit: Traianoupoli

Population (2021)
  - Community: 1,157
- Time zone: UTC+2 (EET)
  - Summer (DST): UTC+3 (EEST)
- Postal code: 68100

Anthia (Greek: Άνθεια) is a village and a community in the southern part of the Evros regional unit in Greece. Antheia is located near the old Greek National Road 2 between Alexandroupoli and Feres. It is 10 km east of the centre of Alexandroupoli. Antheia was the seat of the municipality of Traianoupoli, and a municipal district within that municipality. In 2021 its population was 1,157 for the community, which includes the village Aristino. The settlement was created with the migration of Arvanites from Turkey in 1923. They largely originate from the inhabitants of the villages of Qytezë and Sultanköy.

== Population ==
Year	Village population	Community population
1981	-	-
1991	725	-
2001	862	1,308
2011	781	1,226
2021	747	1,157

== See also ==
- List of settlements in the Evros regional unit
