= Zourafa =

Greek islet

Ζουράφα
- Location within Greece

Geography
- Location: Aegean Sea
- Coordinates: 40°28′21″N 25°50′18″E
- Archipelago: Thracian Sporades

Administration
- Greece

Zourafa or Ladoxera (Greek: Ζουράφα or Λαδόξερα) is an uninhabited Greek islet rock in the Aegean Sea, east of Samothrace, and north of Imbros. It lies at the northeastern tip of the Thracian Sporades, and is administratively part of the regional unit of Evros. Its total area is only 9 m^{2} (97 sq ft) and the total length of the coastline 12 meters (39 ft) (in previous measurements 165 meters; 541 ft). It has been part of the protected areas of the pan-European program NATURA since 2011.

== Name ==
The name of the rock is first attested in a 1521 map by the Turkish explorer Piri Reis in the form of Zurafa Kaya (modern Turkish: Zürafa Kayalıkları), which means 'Giraffe Rocks'. Variations of the same name are Sgorafa or Tzourafa.

The name Ladoxera seems to derive from the presence of oily waters and the smell of oil. Its alternate name, Ladoxera "oil reef", was given to it by sailors who would often spot oil slicks around Zourafa.

In a Flemish map of 1585 it is called Halonesus, while in Venetian in the 1690s it appears to be referred to as Holonisus.

== Geography ==
Zourafa is located six nautical miles (11 km; 6.9 mi) east of Skepasto, the northeastern tip of the island of Samothrace, and 22 nautical miles (41 km; 25 mi) from Alexandroupoli. It has an estimated area of 9 square metres (97 sq ft) and measures 32 metres (0.020 mi) in circumference (undated). Zourafa has been gradually reduced in size by erosion. It peaks out of a 30-metre (98 ft) long underwater ledge, remnant of a volcanic island. Sailors are cautioned about navigating in the vicinity of Zourafa.

Zourafa is part of Greece, and there is a lighthouse on the island. In 2011, it was reported in Greek press that Turkey had started questioning the issue of treaties over the islet, however it is unclear if this is official Turkish policy (see Aegean dispute).

== Lighthouse ==
The lighthouse on Zourafa was destroyed by severe weather in the winter of 2012 and was rebuilt by September. The new lighthouse is powered by solar energy. An icon of Saint Nicholas was placed "in prominent view". Saint Nicholas is the patron saint of sailors, and his icon is found on many ships and in many ports in Greece.

== Preservation ==
Zourafa comprises a Natura 2000-designated area, along with the Fengari mountain and eastern coastal region of Samothrace and the bordering sea. The site was designated a Special Area of Conservation in 2011.
