= Komara =

Komara Κόμαρα
- Community
- Location within Greece
- Coordinates: 41°36′N 26°14′E
- Country: Greece
- Administrative region: East Macedonia and Thrace
- Regional unit: Evros
- Municipality: Orestiada
- Municipal unit: Trigono

Population (2021)
  - Community: 474
- Time zone: UTC+2 (EET)
  - Summer (DST): UTC+3 (EEST)

Komara (Greek: Κόμαρα) is a village in the northwestern part of the Evros regional unit in northern Greece. Komara is in the municipal unit of Trigono. Komara is situated on the left (northern) bank of the river Arda, near the border with Bulgaria. It is 2 km north of Kyprinos, the nearest larger village. It is 20 km south of the Bulgarian town Svilengrad, 27 km northwest of Orestiada and 29 km west of the Turkish city Edirne.

== Population ==
Year	Population
1961	1,119
1981	892
1991	921
2001	774
2011	628
2021	474

== History ==
Komara was founded by the Ottomans between 1780 and 1790. Greeks from Adrianople (Edirne), Ortaköy and Northern Thrace were employed in the manor. The name "Komara" comes from the Turkish phrase (kum aresi) which means "between the sands" in English. The residents came from Epirus, Ortaköy, Svilengrad and Kırklareli. In 1885, 45 to 50 families lived in the village, and a school was constructed. After a brief period of Bulgarian rule between 1913 and 1919, it became part of Greece. As a result, its Bulgarian and Turkish population was exchanged with Greek refugees, mainly from today's Turkey. After Komara was devastated by the floods of Arda in 1931, its inhabitants relocated to a higher location, 1 km north of the original village. In 1997 under the Kapodistrias reform, the community of Komara became part of the new municipality of Trigono with 16 other former communities. Since the 2011 local government reform it is part of the municipality Orestiada, of which it is a community.

== See also ==
- List of settlements in the Evros regional unit
