= Thourio, Evros =

Thourio Θούριο
- Community
- Location within Greece
- Coordinates: 41°26′N 26°33′E
- Country: Greece
- Administrative region: East Macedonia and Thrace
- Regional unit: Evros
- Municipality: Orestiada
- Municipal unit: Orestiada

Population (2021)
  - Community: 471
- Time zone: UTC+2 (EET)
  - Summer (DST): UTC+3 (EEST)
- Vehicle registration: OP

Thourio (Greek: Θούριο) is a village in the northern part of the Evros regional unit, in Greece. Thourio belongs to the municipality of Orestiada. It is located between Orestiada to the north and Didymoteicho to the south, about 4 km west of the river Evros, that forms the border with Turkey here. The nearest villages are Neo Cheimonio to the north and Sofiko to the south. Thourio lies 30 metres above sea level and is a lowland village with a fertile plain.

== History ==
In the present position of Thourio during the Ottoman Empire was a Turkish village, Urlu. With the exchange of populations in 1922, it was inhabited by the Greek Christian inhabitants who came to Urlu from various other parts of Thrace, mainly eastern Thrace. The refugee inhabitants of Thourio were mainly farmers. During the 20th century, the development of Thourio's economy was mainly based on the cultivation of the land, however, later some engaged in trade, others became craftsmen, and others servants. Some of the inhabitants of Thourio emigrated to other parts of Greece, particularly in the 60's when almost half of the village's population immigrated to countries such as Germany, the Netherlands, Belgium, France, Brazil, Australia and elsewhere.

== Population ==
Today approximately 500 people live permanently in Thourio and are engaged in agriculture, trade or are employees of the private or public sector or are retired. In Thourio there is a church, a special education school, a rural doctor's office and other small businesses as well as the community store of the local district of Thourio in the municipality of Orestiada. In Thourio you can also find a small football club "ASPIS", and dance group "TO ELEFTHEROCHORI".

The village has historically also been settled by Arvanites.

Famous people from Thourio include actor Yannis Stankoglou and singer Stefania Liberakakis who represented Greece in the Eurovision Song Contest 2021.

== Transport ==
=== Road ===
Thourio is on the Greek National Road 51 (Feres - Soufli - Didymoteicho - Orestiada - Ormenio - Svilengrad)

=== Rail ===
The settlement has a station on the Alexandroupolis–Svilengrad line.

== See also ==
- List of settlements in the Evros regional unit
