= Trigono =

Trigono Τρίγωνο
- Municipal unit
- Location within the regional unit

- Location within Greece
- Coordinates: 41°42′N 26°14′E
- Country: Greece
- Administrative region: East Macedonia and Thrace
- Regional unit: Evros
- Municipality: Orestiada

Area
  - Municipal unit: 392.5 km^{2} (151.5 sq mi)

Population (2021)
  - Municipal unit: 3,571
  - Municipal unit density: 9.098/km^{2} (23.56/sq mi)
- Time zone: UTC+2 (EET)
  - Summer (DST): UTC+3 (EEST)
- Vehicle registration: EB

Trígono (Greek: Τρίγωνο, [ˈtriɣono], meaning "triangle") is a former municipality in the Evros regional unit, East Macedonia and Thrace, Greece. Since the 2011 local government reform, it is part of the municipality Orestiada, of which it is a municipal unit. The municipal unit has an area of 392.538 km^{2}. The seat of the municipality was in Dikaia. The municipality was created in 1997 under the Capodistrian Plan. Trigono is the country's northernmost municipal unit, situated in the triangle between the rivers Evros and Ardas. It borders Bulgaria to the north and west, and Turkey to the northeast. The nearest cities are Svilengrad (Bulgaria) to the north, Edirne (Turkey) to the east, and Orestiada to the southeast. The area consists mainly of low hills, with plains in the river valleys, and higher elevations up to 400 m towards the west.

The area of Trigono was under Ottoman Turkish rule until 1912-1913 Balkan Wars. After 7 years of Bulgarian rule, it was ceded to Greece in 1920.

== Subdivisions ==
The municipal unit Trigono is subdivided into the following communities (constituent villages in brackets):

- Arzos (Arzos, Kanadas)
- Dikaia (Dikaia, Dilofos, Krios, Palli)
- Elaia
- Therapeio
- Komara
- Marasia
- Milia
- Ormenio
- Pentalofos
- Petrota
- Plati
- Ptelea
- Spilaio

== Population ==
Year	Municipal unit population
1991	8,706
2001	6,656
2011	5,370
2021	3,571
