= II-17 road (Bulgaria) =

Road in Bulgaria

Republic Road I-17
- Републикански път I-17

Route information
- Length: 6 km (3.7 mi)

Major junctions
- From: Km 188.7 of I-1 near Botevgrad
- To: Km 47.0 of Hemus motorway

Location
- Country: Bulgaria

Highway system
- Highways in Bulgaria

Republican Road II-17 (Bulgarian: Републикански път II-17) is a 2nd class road in Bulgaria, running entirely through the territory of Botevgrad Municipality of Sofia Province. With a length of six km, it is the shortest second class road in the country, a little shorter than the 6.5 km II-80 road. It has four lanes through most of its length.

The road starts at Km 188.7 of the first class I-1 road north of the town of Botevgrad and bypasses the town from the northeast and east, serving as its ring road. Some 3.5 km from its starting point, it forms a junction at Km 4.6 of the first class I-3 road and after another 2.5 km it reaches Km 47.0 of the Hemus motorway.
