= Valtos, Evros =

Valtos Βάλτος
- Community
- Location within Greece
- Coordinates: 41°32′N 26°21′E
- Country: Greece
- Administrative region: East Macedonia and Thrace
- Regional unit: Evros
- Municipality: Orestiada
- Municipal unit: Orestiada

Population (2021)
  - Community: 225
- Time zone: UTC+2 (EET)
  - Summer (DST): UTC+3 (EEST)
- Vehicle registration: OP

Valtos (Greek: Βάλτος) is a village in the municipality of Orestiada in the northern part of the Evros regional unit in Greece. It is 17 km west of the centre of Orestiada. The nearest larger village is Fylakio to its northwest. Valtos was annexed to Greece in 1920.

== Population ==
Year	Population
1981	708
1991	660
2001	565
2011	403
2021	225

== See also ==
- List of settlements in the Evros regional unit
