= Petrota =

Petrota Πετρωτά
- Community
- Location within Greece
- Coordinates: 41°41′N 26°09′E
- Country: Greece
- Administrative region: East Macedonia and Thrace
- Regional unit: Evros
- Municipality: Orestiada
- Municipal unit: Trigono

Population (2021)
  - Community: 125
- Time zone: UTC+2 (EET)
  - Summer (DST): UTC+3 (EEST)

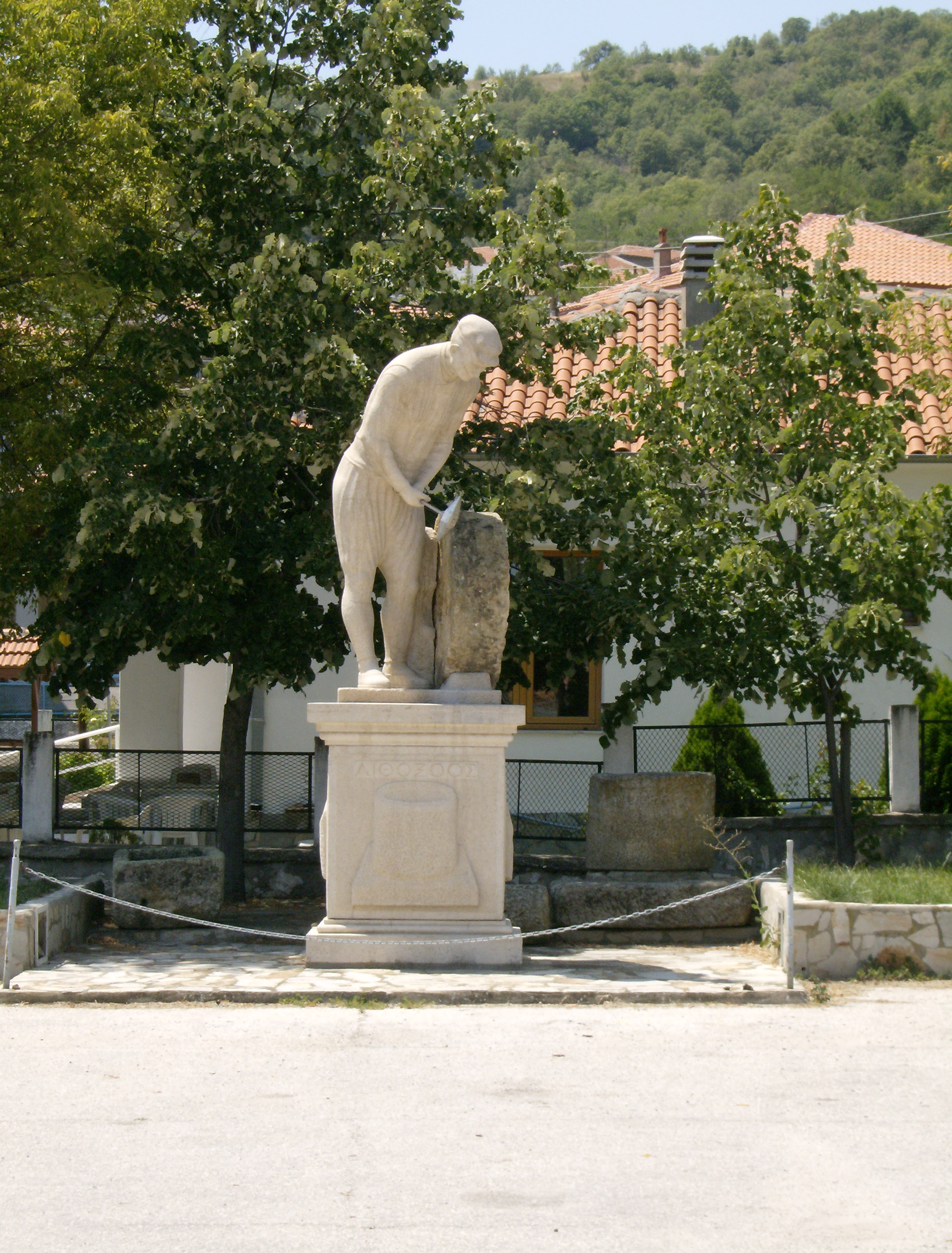
Petrota village

Petrota (Greek: Πετρωτά) is a village at the northernmost point of Greece, part of the municipal unit Trigono.

It was created around 1530 by Greeks that moved there from Epirus and Malta. In 1961 its population was 1,510. In the 1970s a lot of people from Petrota migrated to western Europe, especially to Germany. Its population was 125 at the 2021 census.
