= Dikaia =

Dikaia Δίκαια
- Community
- Location within Greece
- Coordinates: 41°42′N 26°18′E
- Country: Greece
- Administrative region: East Macedonia and Thrace
- Regional unit: Evros
- Municipality: Orestiada
- Municipal unit: Trigono

Population (2021)
  - Community: 557
- Time zone: UTC+2 (EET)
  - Summer (DST): UTC+3 (EEST)

Dikaia (Greek: Δίκαια, [ˈðikea]) is a village in the northern part of the Evros regional unit in Greece. Dikaia was the seat of the former municipality of Trigono, and is part of the municipality Orestiada since 2011. In 2021, its population was 557 for the community, which includes the villages Dilofos, Krios and Palli. It is located on the right bank of the river Evros, where it forms the border with Bulgaria. It is about 15 km southeast of Svilengrad, Bulgaria, and 25 km west of Edirne, Turkey.

== Transport ==
=== Road ===
Dikaia is bypassed by the Greek National Road 51/E85 (Alexandroupoli - Soufli - Orestiada - Ormenio - Svilengrad).

=== Rail ===
The settlement is served by railway station on the Alexandroupoli–Svilengrad line with services to Alexandroupoli, Ormenio and Didymoteicho.

== Population ==
Year	Village population	Community population
1981	1,693	-
1991	1,058	-
2001	797	1,177
2011	561	834
2021	390	557

The town is populated by Arvanites.

== See also ==
- List of settlements in the Evros regional unit
