= Kyani =

Village in Greece

Kyani Κυανή
- Community
- Location within Greece
- Coordinates: 41°22.4′N 26°23.0′E
- Country: Greece
- Administrative region: Eastern Macedonia and Thrace
- Regional unit: Evros
- Municipality: Didymoteicho
- Municipal unit: Didymoteicho

Population (2021)
  - Community: 411
- Time zone: UTC+2 (EET)
  - Summer (DST): UTC+3 (EEST)

Kyani (Greek: Κυανή meaning "blue") is a settlement in the municipality of Didymoteicho in the northern Evros regional unit, Greece. It is situated between farmlands in the plains on the right bank of the river Erythropotamos, at 40 m elevation. In 2021 its population was 411. It is 3 km northeast of Asvestades, 4 km southwest of Mani, and 10 km northwest of Didymoteicho.

== Population ==
Year	Population
1991	570
2001	557
2011	474
2021	411

== History ==
During the Ottoman period Kyani was known under the name Çavuşlu. At the beginning of the 20th century, a Greek school with 25 students was under operation in the village. Kyani became part of Greece after the end of World War I. Its current population is mostly descendants of Greek refugees from Eastern Thrace and Muslims.

== See also ==
- List of settlements in the Evros regional unit
