= Neochori, Evros =

Neochori Νεοχώρι
- Community
- Location within Greece
- Coordinates: 41°30′N 26°27′E
- Country: Greece
- Administrative region: East Macedonia and Thrace
- Regional unit: Evros
- Municipality: Orestiada
- Municipal unit: Orestiada

Population (2021)
  - Community: 655
- Time zone: UTC+2 (EET)
  - Summer (DST): UTC+3 (EEST)
- Vehicle registration: OP

Neochori (Greek: Νεοχώρι meaning new village) is a village and a community in the municipality of Orestiada in the northern part of the Evros regional unit in Greece. The community includes the village Patagi. It is situated 7 km (4.3 mi) west of the centre of Orestiada.

== Population ==
Year	Neochori village	Patagi	Community
1981	1,612	-	-
1991	1,138	-	-
2001	1,159	278	1,437
2011	739	163	902
2021	538	117	655

== History ==
Neochori was ruled by the Ottomans before being annexed to Greece in 1920. It adopted its current name after the annexation. Refugees flowed into the village and the Turkish population was displaced eastward.

== See also ==
- List of settlements in the Evros regional unit
