= Gregoris Mentzas =

Greek scientist and professor

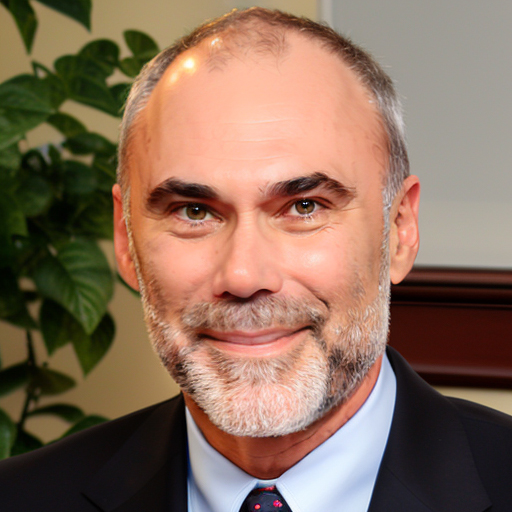
- Gregoris Mentzas
- Known for: trustworthy human-centric Artificial Intelligence, Knowledge Management, AI-driven Decision Support
- Awards: Four Best Paper Awards

Academic background
- Education: National Technical University of Athens (GR)

Gregoris Mentzas (born 1960 in Alexandroupoli, Greece) is a Greek scientist and Professor of Management Information Systems at the National Technical University of Athens, Greece. He is Director of the Information Management Unit, a multi-disciplinary research group at the Institute of Communication and Computer Systems.

His main research focus is on AI-enabled decision-making: augmenting human intelligence with data-driven approaches and using Artificial Intelligence to elevate human decision-making competence. Specifically his current research concerns the development of prescriptive analytics for digital assistants in industry 4.0, the integration of human feedback in reinforcement learning and the use of big data analytics in applications like personalised medicine, smart mobility, and sustainability applications.

Mentzas has published 4 books and more than 300 papers in international peer-reviewed journals and conferences. He sits on the editorial board of five international journals and has served as (co-)Chair or Program Committee Member in more than 55 international conferences. He has led or contributed in more than 50 European research and development projects conducted in collaboration with leading technology firms like SAP, IBM, HP, Siemens, Software AG and ATOS.

Research carried out by his group has led to the establishment of three internet technology companies. His experience includes twelve years of management consulting in corporate strategy and information systems strategy.

During 2006-2009 he served as member of the Board of Directors of the Institute of Communication and Computer Systems, while in the 2010-2019 period he was Director of the division of “Industrial Electric Devices and Decision Systems” at the School of Electrical and Computer Engineering, NTUA.

== Books ==
- Mentzas, G., D. Apostolou, A. Abecker, R. Young (2002) Knowledge Asset Management: Beyond the Process-centred and Product-centred Approaches, 2002, 1-85233-583-1, Springer London.
- Mentzas, G., A. Friesen (2009) Semantic Enterprise Application Integration for Business Processes: Service-Oriented Frameworks, 2009, DOI: 10.4018/978-1-60566-804-8, IGI Global, New York.
- A. Abecker, A. Sheth, G. Mentzas, and L. Stojanovic (2006) Semantic Web Meets eGovernment, Papers from 2006 AAAI Spring Symposium, Technical Report SS-06-01, 158 pp., ISBN 978-1-57735-267-9.
- A. Abecker, G. Mentzas, L. Stojanovic (Editors) Proceedings of the Workshop on Semantic Web and eGovernment, Workshop at the 3rd European Semantic Web Conference 12 June 2006, Budva, Serbia & Montenegro.
