= Arete Kosmidou =

Greek singer (born 1997)

Areti Kosmidou Αρετή Κοσμίδου
- Also known as: Aretha, Aretha the Greek
- Born: Areti Kosmidou; 1997 (age 28–29); Alexandroupoli, Greece
- Genres: Pop; alternative; pop rock
- Occupations: Singer; songwriter
- Instruments: Vocals; guitar; piano
- Years active: 2014–present
- Label: Minos EMI

Areti Kosmidou (Αρετή Κοσμίδου; born 1997), also known by her stage name Aretha, is a Greek singer and songwriter. She rose to prominence in 2014 as a finalist on the first season of The Voice of Greece, where she finished as joint runner-up at the age of sixteen. Following the competition, she released her debut album Distance through Minos EMI and subsequently relocated to London to pursue music studies.

== Early life ==
Kosmidou was born in 1997 in Alexandroupoli, a city in northeastern Greece. She developed an interest in music at an early age and began studying classical guitar and piano at the age of thirteen. Growing up, she was influenced by artists such as Madonna, Beyoncé, Alicia Keys, Christina Aguilera, and Pink, as well as bands including Radiohead, Gorillaz, TLC, Destiny's Child, Alice in Chains, The Cranberries, and The Flaming Lips.

== Career ==
=== The Voice of Greece (2014) ===
In 2014, at the age of sixteen, Kosmidou auditioned for the first season of The Voice of Greece, appearing in the eighth and final blind auditions episode. She performed "Let Her Go" by Passenger, prompting coaches Michalis Kouinelis and Despina Vandi to turn their chairs; she chose to join Kouinelis's team.

During the battle rounds, Kosmidou performed "I Was Made for Lovin' You" against Christina Miliou and was selected by Kouinelis to advance. Throughout the live shows, she performed "Big in Japan", "Little Talks", and "Royals".

In the semi-final, she performed "This Is the Life" as her solo performance and "Poison" as a duet with the band Melisses. She advanced to the final with 53 points from her coach and 57 points from the public. Her original song "So Cruel" was released on iTunes on 3 May 2014, the day after the semi-final.

In the final on 9 May 2014, Kosmidou performed "So Cruel" and a duet with Kouinelis titled "Prin Se Gnoriso". Advancing to the second round alongside Maria Elena Kyriakou and Lefteris Kintatos, she reprised "Let Her Go". Kosmidou finished as joint runner-up with Kintatos, while Kyriakou won the competition.

During her time on the show, Kosmidou received an invitation from Sakis Rouvas to perform at his upcoming concert in Athens. However, she declined due to competition rules prohibiting contestants from appearing at external concerts during the show.

=== Post-competition career ===
Following her appearance on The Voice of Greece, Kosmidou signed with Minos EMI and released her debut album Distance. In June 2015, she returned to perform at the season two finale of The Voice of Greece, singing "Ftani" as a duet with coach Panos Mouzourakis.

In 2015, at the age of eighteen, Kosmidou moved to London to study music at the University of East London. She has resided in the United Kingdom since then, pursuing her music career under the stage name "Aretha" or "Aretha the Greek". She has released several singles including "Diamond Stone" (2019) and "Feel Good".

== Personal life ==
Kosmidou met her partner, a music producer, at a recording studio in London. In February 2022, she became a mother to a daughter.

== The Voice of Greece performances ==
Stage	Song	Original artist	Result
Blind audition	"Let Her Go"	Passenger	Michalis and Despina turned; chose Michalis
Battle rounds	"I Was Made for Lovin' You"	Kiss	Won against Christina Miliou
Live show 2	"Big in Japan"	Alphaville	Saved by public
Live show 3	"Little Talks"	Of Monsters and Men	Saved by public
Live show 4	"Royals"	Lorde	Saved by coach
Semi-final (solo)	"This Is the Life"	Amy Macdonald	Advanced to final
Semi-final (duet)	"Poison"	Alice Cooper	—N/a
Final (solo)	"So Cruel"	Original song	Joint runner-up
Final (duet)	"Prin Se Gnoriso"	Stavento	—N/a
Final (reprise)	"Let Her Go"	Passenger	—N/a

== Discography ==
=== Albums ===
- Distance (2014)

=== Singles ===
- "So Cruel" (2014)
- "Ftani" (with Panos Mouzourakis) (2015)
- "Diamond Stone" (2019)
- "Feel Good" (2022)
