= Vyssa =

Vyssa Βύσσα
- Municipal unit
- Location within the regional unit

- Location within Greece
- Coordinates: 41°32′N 26°35′E
- Country: Greece
- Administrative region: East Macedonia and Thrace
- Regional unit: Evros
- Municipality: Orestiada

Area
  - Municipal unit: 170.2 km^{2} (65.7 sq mi)

Population (2021)
  - Municipal unit: 4,378
  - Municipal unit density: 25.72/km^{2} (66.62/sq mi)
- Time zone: UTC+2 (EET)
  - Summer (DST): UTC+3 (EEST)
- Vehicle registration: EB

Vyssa (Greek: Βύσσα) is a former municipality in the Evros regional unit, East Macedonia and Thrace, Greece. Since the 2011 local government reform it is part of the municipality Orestiada, of which it is a municipal unit. The municipal unit has an area of 170.179 km^{2}. Population 4,378 (2021). The seat of the municipality was in Nea Vyssa. It is named after a former village 4 km (2 mi) to its north that is now in Turkey. Refugees from that side fled into this area and settled into these villages.
