= Ormenio =

Ormenio Ορμένιο
- Community
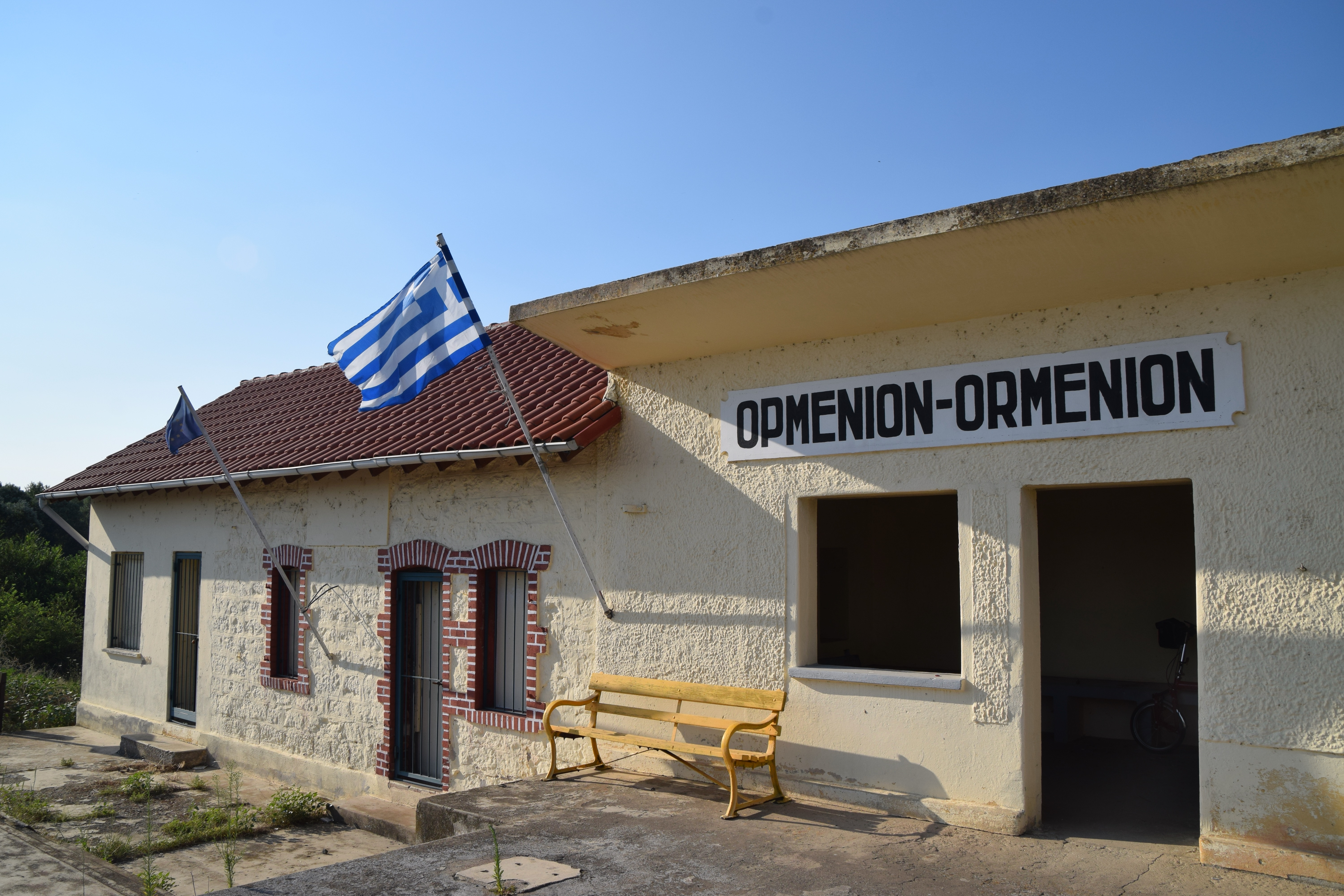
- Ormenio train station

- Location within Greece
- Coordinates: 41°43′N 26°13′E
- Country: Greece
- Geographic region: Western Thrace
- Administrative region: East Macedonia and Thrace
- Regional unit: Evros
- Municipality: Orestiada
- Municipal unit: Trigono

Population (2021)
  - Community: 344
- Time zone: UTC+2 (EET)
  - Summer (DST): UTC+3 (EEST)

Ormenio (Greek: Ορμένιο, romanized: Orménio; Turkish: Çirmen; Bulgarian: Черномен, romanized: Chernomen) is the northernmost place in all of Greece. It is part of the municipal unit of Trigono in the Evros regional unit of Thrace. It is situated near the right bank of the river Evros, which forms the border with Bulgaria here. On the other side of the Evros, 6 km to the north, lies the Bulgarian town Svilengrad. Nearby villages in Greece are Ptelea to its southeast and Petrota to its southwest.

== History ==
In 1371 Ormenio was the site of the Battle of Maritsa in which the Serb army under Ivan Uglesha and his brother Vukashin was decisively defeated by the Ottomans. It was known as "Çirmen" during Ottoman rule and was a sanjak centre until 1829. In 1530 it was inhabited by 394 non-Muslims and 1812 Muslims. By the end of the Russo-Turkish War in 1878, it was inhabited by 870 Bulgarians and 120 Muslims. After the Balkan Wars, the village was annexed to Bulgaria as "Chernomen" until 1919, when the village was ceded to Greece in the Treaty of Neuilly. In 1997 under the Kapodistrias reform, the community of Ormenio became part of the new municipality of Trigono with 12 other former communities. At the 2011 Kallikratis reform, Trigono became a municipal unit of the municipality Orestiada.

== Population ==
Year	Population
1871	990
1981	846
1991	967
2001	807
2011	557
2021	344

== Transport ==
=== Road ===
Ormenio is bypassed by the Greek National Road 51/European route E85 (Feres - Soufli - Orestiada - Ormenio), which continues across the border as the Bulgarian road 80 to Svilengrad.

=== Rail ===
The community is served by Ormenio railway station, the most northernly railway station in Greece and the terminal for (the Greek portion) the Alexandroupolis–Svilengrad line. There is currently no rail connection to Svilengrad via Ormenio. Ormenio had a railway station on the line from Didymoteicho to Harmanli in Bulgaria. During the Ottoman era, Ormenio was called Çirmen in Turkish.

== Notable locals ==
- Flavius Belisarius, the famous Roman general, was born in Germen, the Roman precursor of Ormenio.

== See also ==
- List of settlements in the Evros regional unit
