= Greek National Road 51 =

Trunk road in Greece

Coordinates: 41.3857°N 26.5165°E

National Road 51
- Εθνική Οδός 51
- Route of the EO51 road, in blue
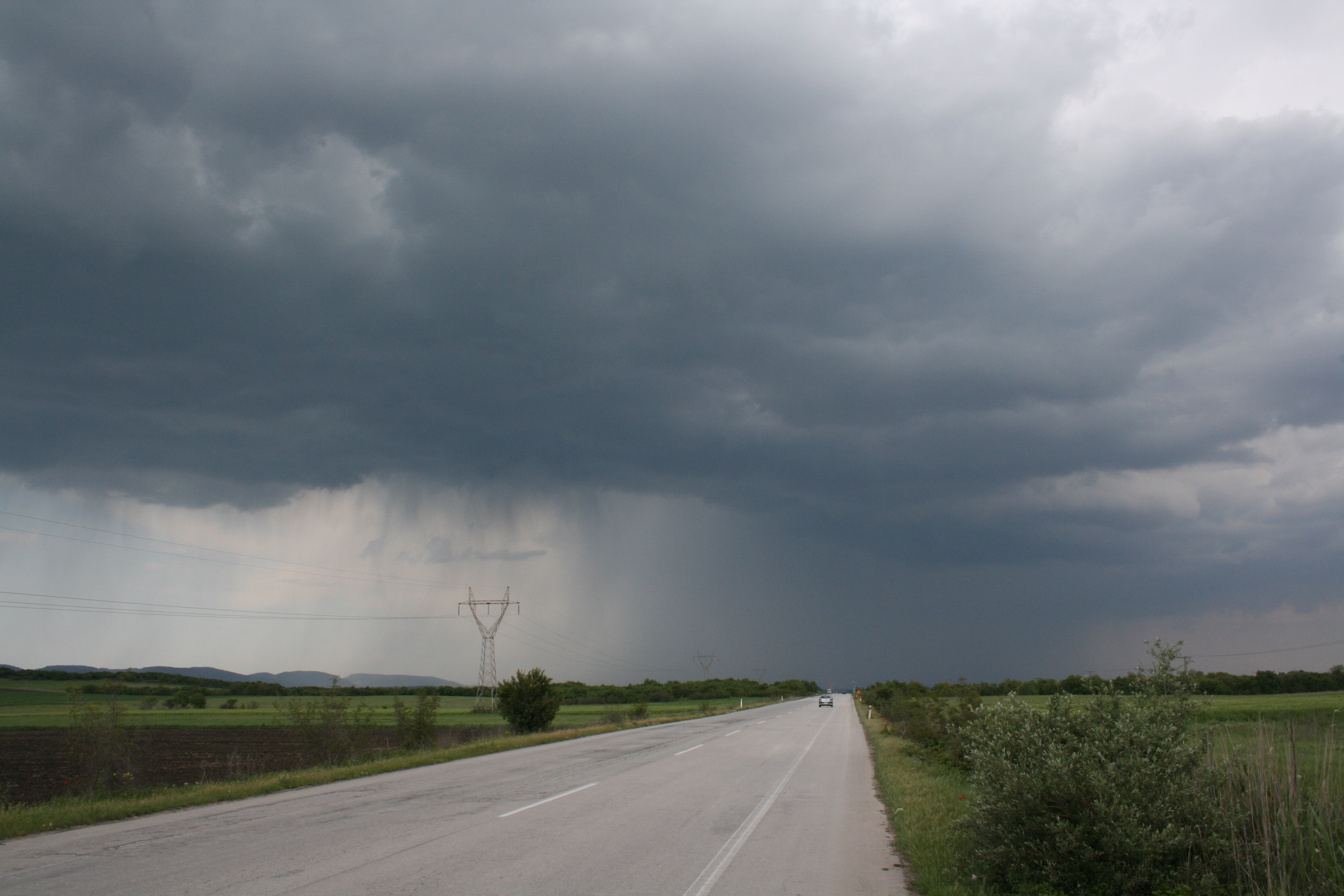
- EO51 in 2007

Route information
- Part of E85
- Length: 99.6 km (61.9 mi)
- Existed: 9 July 1963–present

Major junctions
- South end: Ardani
- North end: Border with Turkey (near Kastanies)

Location
- Country: Greece
- Regions: Eastern Macedonia and Thrace
- Primary destinations: Ardani; Didymoteicho; Orestiada; Kastanies; Border with Turkey

Highway system
- Highways in Greece; Motorways; National roads
| ← EO50 | → EO53 |

Greek National Road 51 (Greek: Εθνική Οδός 51, abbreviated as EO51) is a predominantly single carriageway road in the Evros regional unit of Greece. The road is a branch of the EO2 from Alexandroupolis and runs almost parallel to the Evros river from Ardani in the south to Kastanies in the north, before meeting the D.100 road at the Greece–Turkey border towards Edirne. The EO51 is about 128 km long, and forms part of the European route E85.

Part of the EO51, between the junction with the A2 motorway near Ardani and Mandra, is being upgraded to the A21 expressway: as of October 2026, the expressway is partially complete between Provatonas and Mandra.

== Route ==
The EO51 is officially defined as a branch of the EO2 from Ardani (about 40 km east of Alexandroupolis) to the Greece–Turkey border between Kastanies and Edirne (Adrianopolis), via Soufli, Didymoteicho and Orestiada. The EO51 generally runs parallel to the Evros river on the western bank, up towards Kastanies: the EO51 then turns east, south of the Arda river, to meet the D.100 road at the Greece–Turkey border, towards Edirne. There is an interchange with the A2 motorway (Egnatia Odos), 2 km north from the southern end of the EO51.

In the 2000s, a new single carriageway link road was built as a branch of the EO51 from Kastanies to Svilengrad in Bulgaria, avoiding Turkey and meeting the II-88 (now the II-80) road at the then-new border crossing at Ormenio: the Hellenic Statistical Authority designates the Kastanies–Ormenio link road as the EO52 road, but that number is not used in practice. The new road was part of a project to complete the European route E85, which on 12 September 1986 was rerouted from the then-planned road between Podkova and Komotini (now part of the A23 expressway in Greece) to cover almost the entirety of the EO51 towards Alexandroupolis, except for the connection between Kastanies and the D.100 road. Greece adopted the current E-road numbering system on 9 January 1989, when it joined the 1975 European Agreement on Main International Traffic Arteries (AGR).

== History ==
Ministerial Decision G25871 of 9 July 1963 created the EO51 from part of the short-lived EO41 from 1955, which followed the route of the current EO2 from Thessaloniki to Ardani, and then the current EO51 for the remainder.

== Future plans ==
Ministerial Decision DMEO/o/7157/e/1042 of 1 October 2008 planned to replace Kastanies–Ormenio National Road and part of the EO51 with the A21: in 2016, the project to convert part of the EO51 into a grade-separated expressway (between the junction with the A2 and Mandra) was approved. As of October 2026, the expressway is partially complete between Provatonas and Mandra.
