= European route E85 =

Road in trans-European E-road network

E85

Route information
- Length: 2,314 km (1,438 mi)

Major junctions
- North end: E272 in Klaipėda, Lithuania
- E40 in Dubno, Ukraine; E50 in Ternopil, Ukraine; E80 in Dimitrovgrad, Bulgaria
- South end: Alexandroupolis, Greece

Location
- Countries: Lithuania, Belarus, Ukraine, Romania, Bulgaria, Greece

Highway system
- International E-road network; A Class; B Class

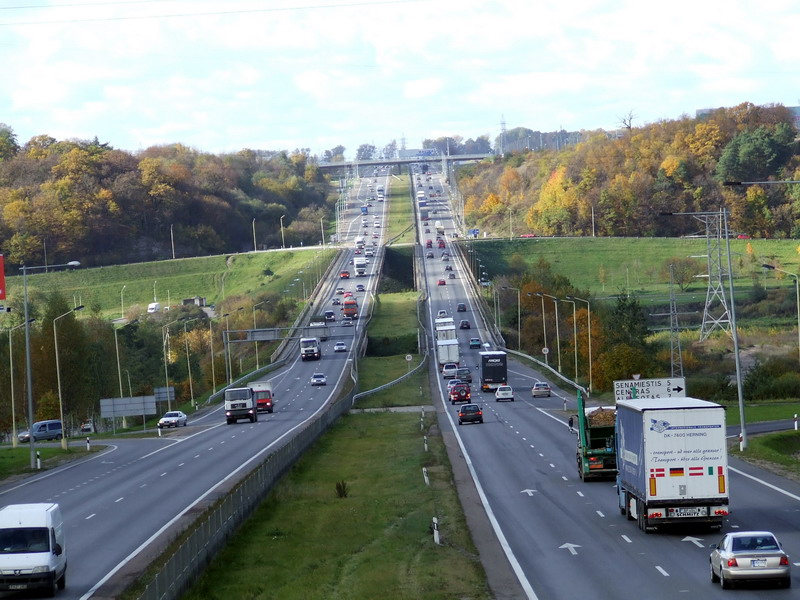
Expressway near Kaunas, Lithuania. Bridge over the Neris River.

European route E85 is part of the International E-road network, which is a series of main roads in Europe.

The E 85 starts from Klaipėda, Lithuania and ends at Alexandroupolis, Greece.

The E 85 is 2,314 km (1,438 mi) long.

The definition of its route by UNECE is: Klaipėda - Kaunas - Vilnius - Lida - Slonim - Kobrin - Luck - Černovcy - Siret - Suceava - Săbăoani - Roman - Bacău - Mărășești - Tișița - Buzău - Urziceni - București - Giurgiu - Ruse - Bjala - Veliko Tarnovo - Stara Zagora - Haskovo - Svilengrad - Ormenio - Kastanies - Didymoteicho - Alexandropouli.

== Route ==
=== Lithuania ===
- A 1: Klaipėda ( E272) - Kryžkalnis ( E77) - Kaunas ( E67 E262) - Vilnius ( E28 E272)
- A 3: Vilnius ( E28 E272)
- A 15: Vilnius ( E28) - Šalčininkai

=== Belarus ===
- M 11: Beiniakoni - Lida - Slonim - Ivatsevichy ( E30)
- M 1: Ivatsevichy (Start of Concurrency with E30) - Kobryn (End of Concurrency with E30)

=== Ukraine ===
- M 19: Domanove - Kovel ( E373) - Dubno ( E40) - Ternopil ( E50) - Chernivtsi - Porubne

=== Romania ===
- DN2: Siret - Suceava ( E58) - Săbăoani ( E583) - Roman - Bacău ( E574) - Tișița ( E581) - Focșani - Buzău ( E577) - Urziceni (Start of concurrency with E60) - Bucharest (End of concurrency with E60)
- DN5: Bucharest (Start of concurrency with E70) - Giurgiu

=== Bulgaria ===
- I-2: Ruse (End of Concurrency with E70)
- I-5: Ruse ( E70) - Byala ( E83) - Veliko Tarnovo ( E772) - Stara Zagora ( E773) - Dimitrovgrad ( E80) - Haskovo
- I-8: Haskovo - Harmanli - Novo Selo

=== Greece ===
- EO51: Ormenio – Ardanio ( E90) – Alexandroupolis

The E85 in Greece runs from Ormenio in the north to Alexandroupolis to the south, via Kastanies and Didymoteicho. In relation to the national road network, the E85 follows the EO51 road from Ormenio to Ardani at the crossing with E90/A2 motorway. The E85 it signposted to go along the EO51 from Ardani to Alexandroupolis past its airport.

== See also ==
- Danube Bridge
