= Orestiada =

City in Western Thrace, Greece

Orestiada Ορεστιάδα
- Municipality
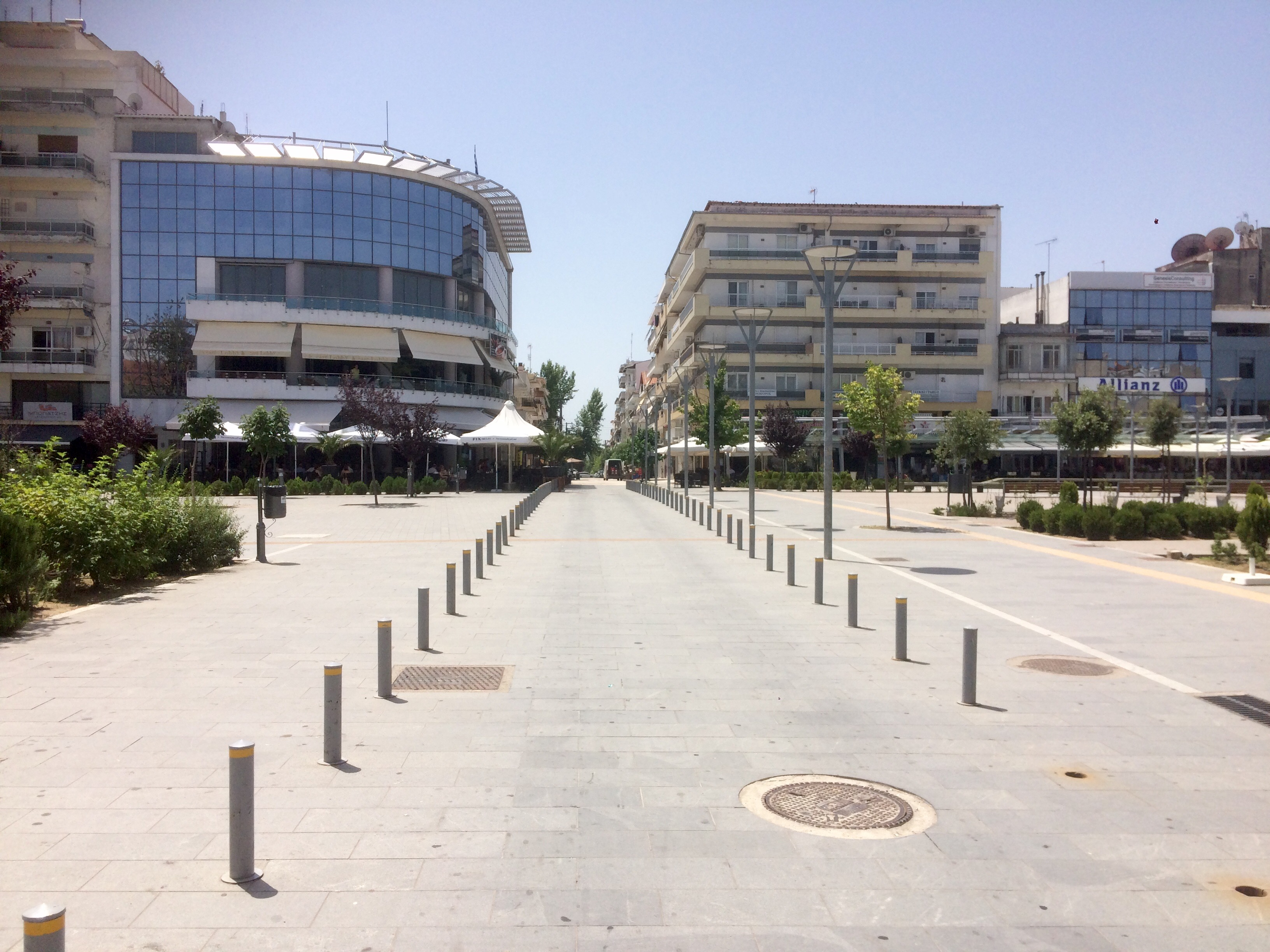
- City centre

- Location within Greece
- Coordinates: 41°30′N 26°32′E
- Country: Greece
- Geographic region: Thrace
- Administrative region: Eastern Macedonia and Thrace
- Regional unit: Evros
- City established: 12 August 1923; 103 years ago

Area
  - Municipality: 955.6 km^{2} (369.0 sq mi)
  - Municipal unit: 256.9 km^{2} (99.2 sq mi)
- Elevation: 35 m (115 ft)

Population (2021)
  - Municipality: 31,686
  - Density: 33.16/km^{2} (85.88/sq mi)
  - Municipal unit: 22,005
  - Municipal unit density: 85.66/km^{2} (221.8/sq mi)
  - Community: 19,666
- Time zone: UTC+2 (EET)
  - Summer (DST): UTC+3 (EEST)
- Postal code: 682 00
- Area code: 25520
- Vehicle registration: OP
- Website: www.orestiada.gr

Orestiada (Greek: Ορεστιάδα, romanized: Orestiáda, formerly Ancient Greek: Νέα Ορεστιάς, romanized: Néa Orestiás), is the northeasternmost, northernmost and newest city of Greece and the second largest of the Evros regional unit of Thrace. It was founded in 1923 by Greek refugees from Edirne, after the population exchange between Greece and Turkey. It has a population of about 20,000.

== History ==
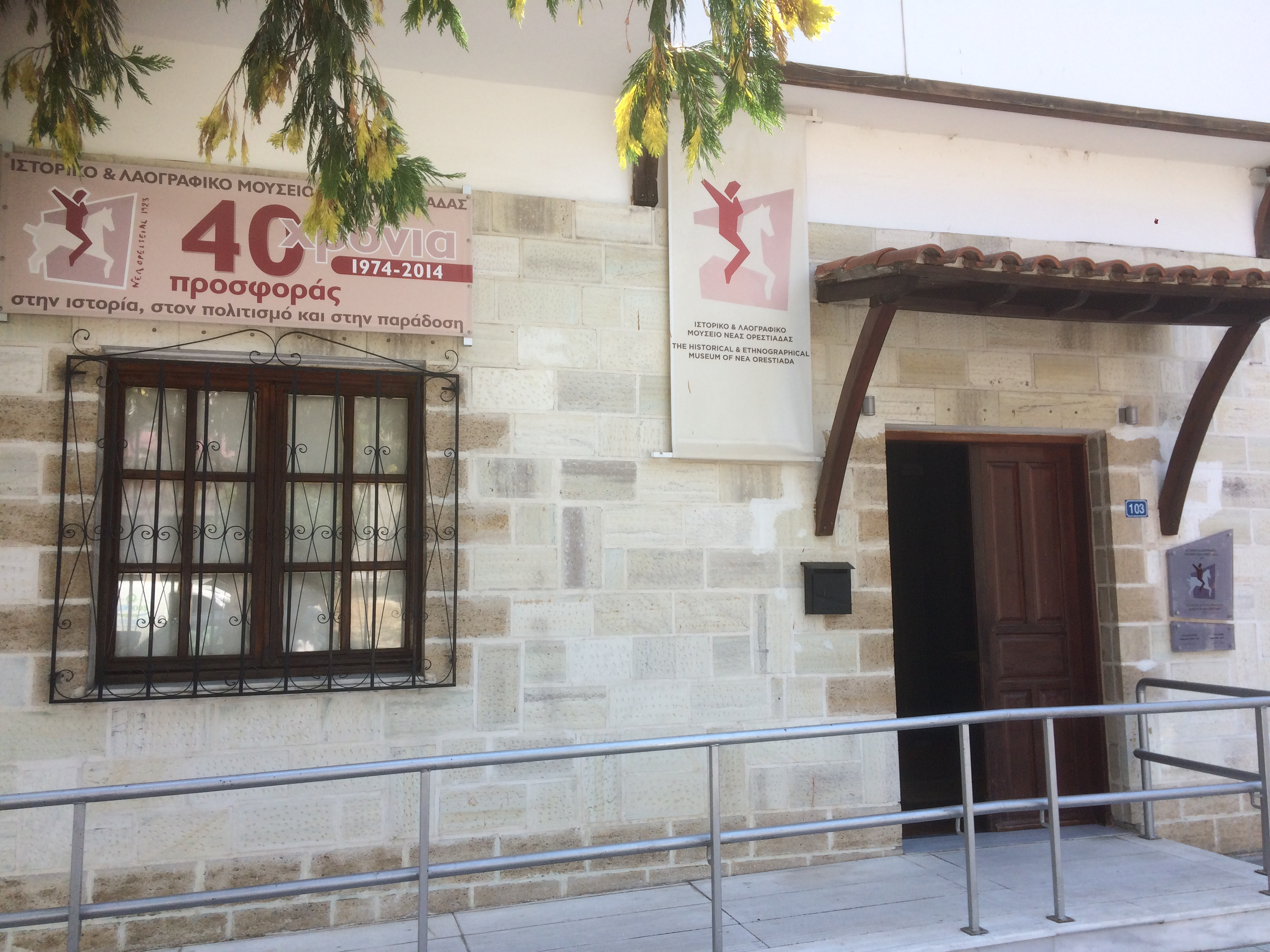
Historical and Folklore Museum of Orestiada

In ancient times, there was Orestias, a small settlement on this site which legends claim was founded by Orestes, the son of Agamemnon and Clytemnestra.

Following the Greco-Turkish War (1919–1922) and the Armistice of Mudanya (October 1922), the Western Forces surrendered Eastern Thrace to Turkey and the Greek army was ordered to withdraw within 15 days to positions east of Evros. As a result, Adrianople (renamed Edirne) which is located to the east of Evros, became Turkish, but Karagatch (Karaağaç), located to the west of Evros, remained in Greece. As Eastern Thrace was evacuated by its Greek population, several residents of Edirne fled to its neighboring suburb, Karagatch, on the other bank of the river (the west and still Greek), hoping that something would change and they could go back to their homes more easily. However at the Lausanne conference, Karagatch was transferred to Turkish control.

The 17,000 Greek inhabitants of the Karagatch Triangle learned of this concession on 27 May 1923. The abandonment of the old Orestiada began in July 1923, as the population moved beyond the Evros River, the new border. On 4 June 1923, a committee, which had only been formed the day before at a joint meeting of the inhabitants of old Orestiada, traveled 17 kilometers south, to the uninhabited rural site of Kum-Tsiflik (Sandy Estate), to view the possible new settlement. On 12 August 1923, the new city called New Orestiada was inaugurated to remind the old Orestiada, Karagatch. The inauguration of the new city took place in August 1923 by the Metropolitan of Adrianople Polycarpos, with Spyros Dassios also in attendance.

== Economy ==
Orestiada has a medical center, an orchestra, and a choir as well as a sugar factory, outside the city which processes locally grown sugar beets. Asparagus, potatoes, tobacco, watermelons, and corn are also grown. As well, a cattle breeding fund gives commercial impetus to the city and the whole area which is in such an economically strategic location in Europe.

It is also the site of the Fylakio detention center for refugees seeking asylum in Greece. In November 2010, the European Union sent Frontex forces to Orestiada to help Greek police patrol the local section of the border with Turkey. Some 31,400 people crossed just that portion of the border in the first nine months of 2010.

== Geography ==
Orestiada lies in the plain of the river Evros, at 40 metres above sea level. Orestiada is only 6 km west of the banks of the Evros, which forms a natural border between Greece and Turkey. Orestiada is located 17 km north of Didymoteicho, 19 km south of Edirne, 28 km southeast of the Greek-Turkish-Bulgarian tripoint, 40 km southeast of Svilengrad, 91 km northeast of Alexandroupoli, and 212 km west of Istanbul.

== Transport ==
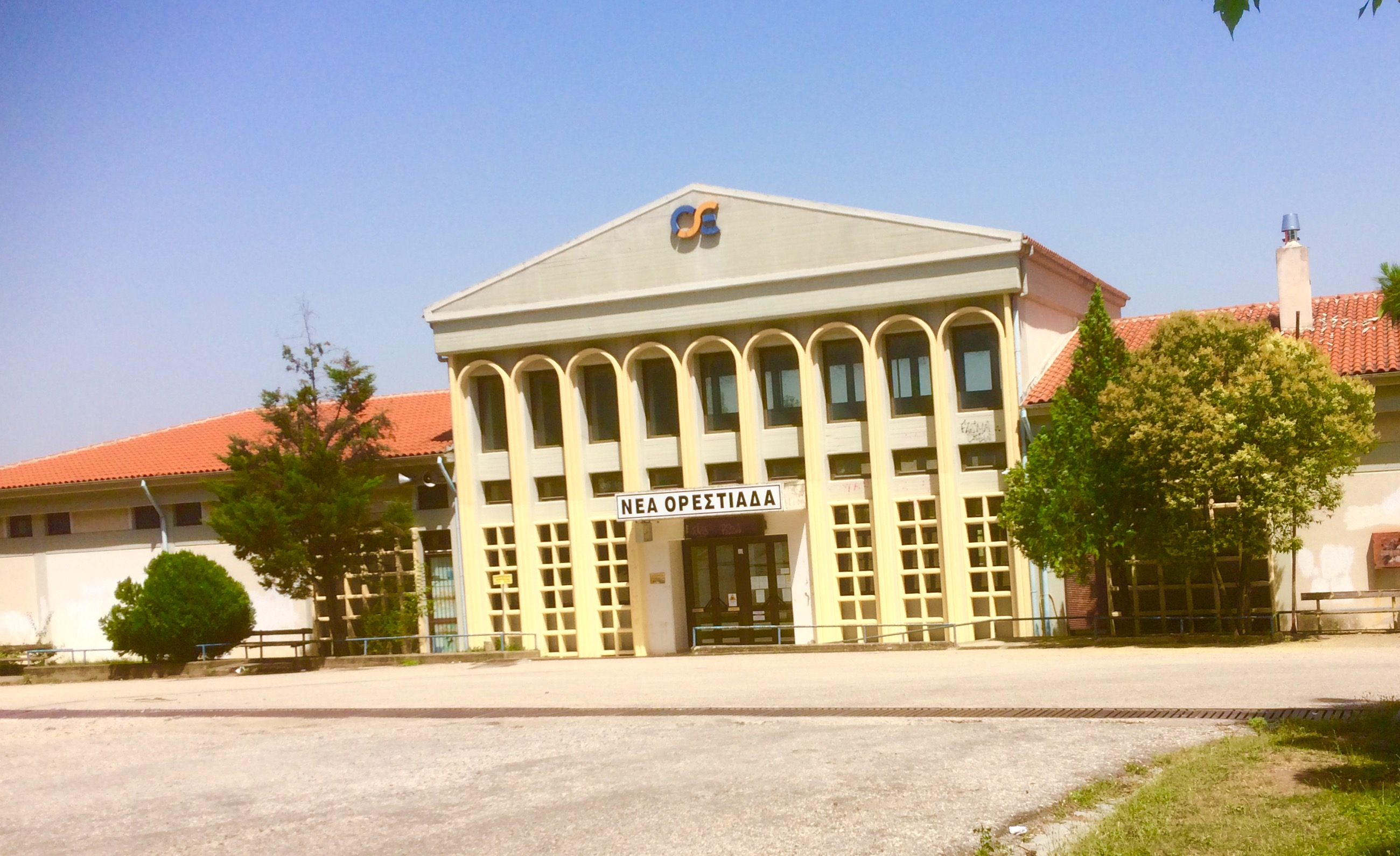
Railway station, taken in 2017

=== Road ===
The Greek National Road 51/E85 passes 1 km to the west of Orestiada.

=== Rail ===
The city is served by two railway stations, the larger Orestiada railway station, and a smaller station Sakkos, both on the Alexandroupoli–Svilengrad line. Historically the city was on the İstanbul Sirkeci-Svilengrad line, since 1971 a parallel railway line that runs exclusively over Turkish territory so that the Orestiada station is now touched only by regional traffic.

== Education ==
In 1999, Orestiada became the fourth town to host university departments (faculties) of the Democritus University of Thrace. The faculties based in Orestiada are the Department of Agricultural Development and the Department of Forestry, Environmental Management and Natural Resources. Both faculties have a five-year curriculum. More than 800 students live in the city.

== Sports ==
Orestias hosts two sports club with presence in the higher national divisions, Orestis Orestiada F.C. a football club and A.C. Orestias a volleyball club, playing in A1 Ethniki.

Sport clubs based in Orestiada
Club	Founded	Sports	Achievements
Orestis Orestiada F.C.	1927	Football	Earlier presence in Gamma Ethniki
A.C. Orestias	1970	Volleyball	Presence in A1 Ethniki, finalist of Greek championship and European CEV cup.

== Climate ==
Orestiada has relatively mild winters and hot summers. Rain falls mostly during the winter.

Climate data for Orestiada (2006-2023)
Month	Jan	Feb	Mar	Apr	May	Jun	Jul	Aug	Sep	Oct	Nov	Dec	Year
Mean daily maximum °C (°F)	7.6 (45.7)	10.8 (51.4)	14.6 (58.3)	20.1 (68.2)	25.9 (78.6)	30.4 (86.7)	33.3 (91.9)	33.7 (92.7)	28.2 (82.8)	20.8 (69.4)	15.2 (59.4)	9.3 (48.7)	20.8 (69.5)
Daily mean °C (°F)	3.6 (38.5)	6.1 (43.0)	9.1 (48.4)	13.6 (56.5)	19.0 (66.2)	23.3 (73.9)	25.6 (78.1)	25.9 (78.6)	21.0 (69.8)	15.0 (59.0)	10.4 (50.7)	5.3 (41.5)	14.8 (58.7)
Mean daily minimum °C (°F)	−0.5 (31.1)	1.3 (34.3)	3.6 (38.5)	7.0 (44.6)	12.0 (53.6)	16.1 (61.0)	17.8 (64.0)	18.1 (64.6)	13.8 (56.8)	9.1 (48.4)	5.5 (41.9)	1.3 (34.3)	8.8 (47.8)
Average rainfall mm (inches)	65.5 (2.58)	42.7 (1.68)	44.0 (1.73)	48.0 (1.89)	39.0 (1.54)	46.2 (1.82)	31.4 (1.24)	16.4 (0.65)	30.7 (1.21)	63.0 (2.48)	44.4 (1.75)	60.9 (2.40)	532.2 (20.97)
Source 1: National Observatory of Athens Monthly Bulletins (Jul 2006 - Sep 2023)
Source 2: Orestiada N.O.A station and World Meteorological Organization

== Municipality ==
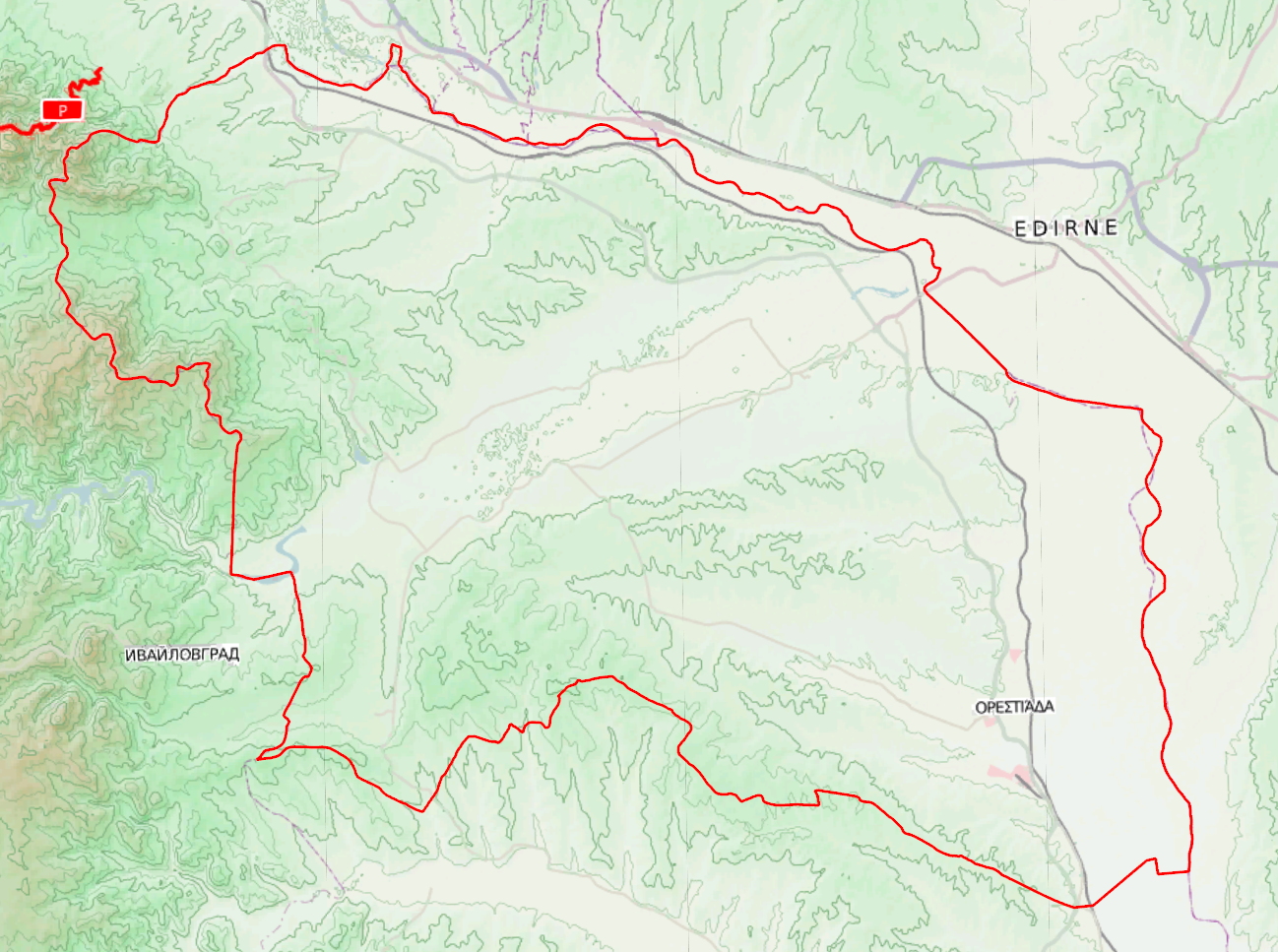
Orestiada municipality.

The municipality Orestiada was formed at the 2011 local government reform by the merger of the following 4 former municipalities, that became municipal units:

- Kyprinos
- Orestiada
- Trigono
- Vyssa

The municipality has an area of 955.591 km^{2}, the municipal unit 256.898 km^{2}.

=== Communities ===
The municipal unit Orestiada is subdivided into the following communities (constituent settlements in brackets):

- Orestiada (Orestiada, Lepti, Neos Pyrgos, Palaia Sagini, Sakkos)
- Ampelakia
- Chandras
- Megali Doxipara
- Neo Cheimonio
- Neochori (Neochori, Patagi)
- Thourio
- Valtos

== Province ==
The province of Orestiada (Greek: Επαρχία Ορεστιάδας) was one of the provinces of the Evros Prefecture. It had the same territory as the present municipality. It was abolished in 2006.

== Population ==
Year	town	municipal community	municipal unit (Kapodistrias)	municipality (Kallikratis)
1951	7,719	12,832	17,825	43,929
1961	10,281	12,908	19,441	48,821
1971	10,727	12,513	17,637	40,869
1981	12,685	14,727	20,297	43,141
1991	12,691	14,783	19,669	40,821
2001	15,246	17,194	21,730	39,485
2011	18,426	20,211	23,584	37,695
2021	18,164	19,666	22,005	31,686

The population of the settlements within the municipal community of Orestiada at the 2021 census was:

- Orestiada: 18,164
- Lepti: 483
- Neos Pyrgos: 855
- Palaia Sagini: 17
- Sakkos: 147

== See also ==
- List of settlements in the Evros regional unit
