= Evros (regional unit) =

Evros Περιφερειακή ενότητα Έβρου
- Regional unit
- Municipalities of Evros

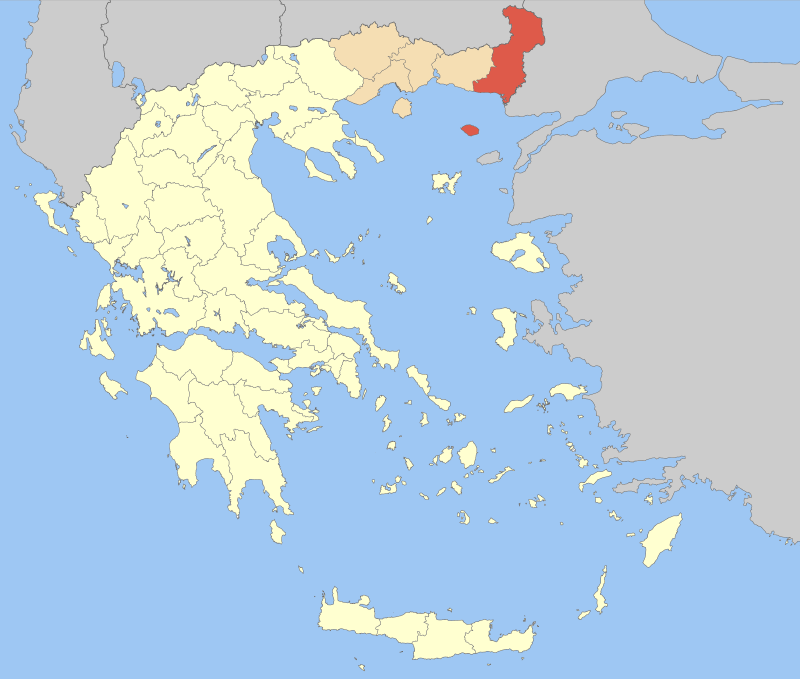
- Evros within Greece

- Location within Greece
- Coordinates: 41°10′N 26°05′E
- Country: Greece
- Administrative region: Eastern Macedonia and Thrace
- Seat: Alexandroupolis

Area
  - Total: 4,242 km^{2} (1,638 sq mi)

Population (2021)
  - Total: 133,802
  - Density: 31.54/km^{2} (81.69/sq mi)
- Time zone: UTC+2 (EET)
  - Summer (DST): UTC+3 (EEST)
- Postal code: 68x xx
- Area code: 255x0
- Vehicle registration: ΕΒ, ΟΡ

Evros (Greek: Περιφερειακή ενότητα Έβρου, romanized: Perifereiakí enótita Évrou) is one of the regional units of Greece. It is part of the region of East Macedonia and Thrace. Its name is derived from the river Evros, which appears to have been a Thracian hydronym. Evros is the northernmost regional unit. It borders Turkey to the east, across the river Evros, and it borders Bulgaria to the north and the northwest.

Its capital is Alexandroupolis. Together with the regional units Rhodope and Xanthi, it forms the geographical region of Western Thrace. The population density was 32 per km^{2} (2021).

== Geography ==
Flag of rebels of Evros region during the Greek War of Independence

Evros is one of the largest regional units of Greece. It forms the eastern part of the geographical region Western Thrace, and includes the island Samothrace in the northern Aegean Sea. Its length is about 150 km from north to south (excluding Samothrace). Its width ranges from 70 to 100 km from east to west. The most important rivers are the Evros and its tributary Arda.

The Rhodope Mountains lie in the west and the southwest. The Aegean Sea lies to the south. The Evros valley is flat. Samothrace is mountainous.

The coastal area has a predominantly Mediterranean climate, whereas the northern part and the mountains have a colder continental climate.

== Administration ==
The Evros regional unit is subdivided into 5 municipalities. These are (number as in the map in the infobox):

- Alexandroupolis (1)
- Didymoteicho (2)
- Orestiada (3)
- Samothrace (Samothraki, 4)
- Soufli (5)

=== Prefecture ===
Evros was established as a prefecture in 1930 (Greek: Νομός Έβρου), when the former Thrace Prefecture was divided into the Rhodope and Evros prefectures. As a part of the 2011 Kallikratis government reform, the prefecture was transformed into a regional unit within the East Macedonia and Thrace region, with no change in its boundaries. At the same time, the municipalities were reorganised, according to the table below.

New municipality (2011)	Old municipalities	Seat
Alexandroupolis	Alexandroupolis	Alexandroupolis
Alexandroupolis	Traianoupoli	Alexandroupolis
Alexandroupolis	Feres	Alexandroupolis
Didymoteicho	Didymoteicho	Didymoteicho
Didymoteicho	Metaxades	Didymoteicho
Orestiada	Orestiada	Orestiada
Orestiada	Vyssa	Orestiada
Orestiada	Kyprinos	Orestiada
Orestiada	Trigono	Orestiada
Samothrace (Samothraki)	Samothrace	Samothrace
Soufli	Soufli	Soufli
Soufli	Orfeas	Soufli
Soufli	Tychero	Soufli

=== Provinces ===
- Province of Orestiada - Orestiada
- Province of Didymoteicho - Didymoteicho
- Province of Soufli - Soufli
- Province of Alexandroupolis - Alexandroupolis
- Province of Samothrace - Samothrace

Note: Provinces no longer hold any legal status in Greece.

== History ==
The region had been under the rule of the Byzantine Empire from the time of the division of the Roman Empire into Eastern and Western empires in the early fourth century AD. It was part of the theme of Thrace and then part of the theme of Macedonia, from where the Macedonian dynasty originated. Manuel Erotikos Komnenos was born in the theme of Thrace, who was the first fully documented ancestor of the Komnenos dynasty. The emperor of Nicaea, John III Doukas Vatatzes, was born c. 1192 in Didymoteicho. Byzantine emperor John V Palaiologos was born in 18 June 1332 in Didymoteicho.

As a part of Western Thrace, the territory of the Evros regional unit followed the fate of that region. In 1821, several parts of Evros region rebelled, such as Lavara and Samothraki, and participated in the Greek War of Independence. It became part of Greece in 1920 when it was ceded by Bulgaria as a result of the Treaty of Neuilly-sur-Seine. Initially it was part of the Thrace Prefecture, which was subdivided in 1930.

During the Greco-Turkish War (1919-1922), many Greek refugees from Eastern Thrace, next door, settled in the Evros. New towns were built, including Orestiada. The Evros river valley has flooded several times, with the most recent floods taking place in 2005, 2006, 2014 and in 2021 where the multiple and largest floods took place.

== Transport ==
=== Railway ===
The Alexandroupolis–Svilengrad railway is the main railway within the Evros regional unit: the railway connects with the Thessaloniki–Alexandroupolis railway at Alexandroupolis, and the Istanbul–Pythio railway at Pythio. As of October 2026, passenger trains only run between Alexandroupoli and Ormenio.

=== Road ===
The A2 motorway (Egnatia Odos), part of the European route E90, passes through the regional unit to the south, leading to Thessaloniki and Igoumenitsa to the west: the A2 stops short of the border with Turkey at Kipoi, with the EO2 road connecting the A2 with the D.110 road. The EO2 also leads to Thessaloniki, but unlike the motorway it passes through Alexandroupolis and Feres.

The European route E85 runs between Alexandroupolis and the border with Bulgaria near Ormenio, via Kastanies. The route includes the EO2, EO51 and the Kastanies–Ormenio National Road: part of the EO51, between the junction with the A2 near Ardani and Mandra, is being upgraded to the A21 expressway.

The EO53 road runs between Alexandroupolis and Mikro Dereio, near the border with Bulgaria: however, the border crossing itself is unbuilt.

=== Air ===
The Alexandroupolis International Airport is served by mostly national flights. The airport is east of the city, accessible via the EO2 road.

== Sights ==
The most important sights of the prefecture are:

- Church of Theotokos Kosmosoteira. The church was founded in 1152. It is considered one of the best examples of Byzantine art in Greece.
- Samothrace with the Sanctuary of the Great Gods and its Archaeological Museum.
- Evros Delta National Park
- Lighthouse of Alexandroupolis
- The post-Byzantine churches in the villages of Alepochori (Church of Saint Athanasius), Metaxades (Church of Saint Athanasius) and Paliouri (Church of Saint Pantaleon)
- The ancient Mesimvria-Zoni
- Dadia Forest
- Fossilized Forest of Lefkimmi
- Cyclops Polyphemus Cave in Makri
- Burial Tomb of Mikri Doxipara: Roman Tomb which dates from the 2nd century
- Didymoteicho
  - Byzantine Castle
  - Çelebi Sultan Mehmed Mosque
  - Hamam of Oruç Paşa
  - Türbe of Oruç Pasha
  - the Kayali Cave and the Vouva Cave
- Castle of Pythio
- The thermal baths of Traianoupoli
- Castle of Avanta-Potamos
- The Ethnological Museum of Thrace in Alexandroupolis
- The Silk Museum of Soufli
- Zourafa islet
- The village Metaxades with its traditional architecture
- The Pomak villages Goniko and Roussa with the traditional architecture
  - The Seyyid Ali Sultan Tekke near Roussa

== Notable people ==
- Hrysopiyi Devetzi (1976, Alexandroupolis), Greek silver Olympic Champion in triple jump (Athens, 2004)
- Demis Nikolaidis (1973, Alexandroupolis), Greek international footballer, European Champion with Greece national football team (Portugal, 2004)
- Stelios Venetidis (1976, Orestiada), Greek international footballer, European Champion with Greece national football team (Portugal, 2004)
- Athanasios Tsigas (1982, Aristeino Alexandroupolis), Greek footballer
- Lefteris Hapsiadis (1953, Kila Feres), Greek lyricist and writer
- Andreas Andreadis (1982, Provatonas Soufli), Greek international volleyball player
- Marios Giourdas (1973, Alexandroupolis), international volleyball player
- Thanassis Moustakidis (1962, Soufli), Greek international volleyball player, player with the most appearances with Greece National football team
- Nikos Samaras (1970-2013, Orestiada), Greek international volleyball player, player-symbol for the Greek volleyball
- Constantin Carathéodory (1873-1950, Nea Vyssa), Greek mathematician
- Dimosthenis Michalentzakis (1998, Feres), Greek Gold Paralympic Champion Swimmer in category S9 (Rio, 2016)
- Marinos Ouzounidis (1968, Alexandroupolis), former international Greek footballer, now football coach
- Manolis Siopis (1994, Alexandroupolis), Greek international footballer
- Dimosthenis Magginas (1982, Alexandroupolis), Greek middle-distance, long-distance runner
- Fotis Kosmas, (1926-1995), Alexandroupolis) Mediterranean and 7th Olympic winner in decathlon
- Kostas Gatsioudis (1973, Didymoteicho), 6th Olympic winner, Mediterranean and Silver World champion, in Javelin throw
- Nikos Alavantas (1959, Krios Orestiada), former Greek international footballer
- Giannis Matzourakis (1949, Didymoteicho), former footballer, now football coach
- Nikos Hadjinikolaou (1962, Alexandroupolis), Greek journalist
- Renos Haralampidis (1970, Spilaio), Greek actor, film director
- Yannis Stankoglou (1974, Thourio), Greek actor
- John III Doukas Vatatzes (1192–1254, Didymoteicho), emperor of Nicaea
- John V Palaiologos (1332–1391, Didymoteicho), Byzantine Emperor
- Bayezid II (1481–1512, Didymoteicho) Sultan of the Ottoman Empire
- Eugenios Eugenidis (1882–1954, Didymoteicho), shipping magnate
- Sürmeli Ali Pasha, (1645-1695, Didymoteicho), Grand Vizier of the Ottoman Empire
- Konstantinos Malamatinas, founder of retsina Malamatina
- Paraskevas Tselios (1997, Alexandroupolis), Greek international volleyball player with Greece men's national volleyball team
- Savvas Gentsoglou (1990, Alexandroupolis), Greek football player
- Gregoris Mentzas (1960, Alexandroupolis), Greek management scientist and professor at the National Technical University of Athens
- Giorgos Valavanidis (1974, Alexandroupolis), Greek; former international basketball player, silver medalist with Greece women's national under-16 basketball team in 1991 and Greek champion with PAOK
- Arete Kosmidou (1997, Alexandroupolis), Greek singer
- Anestis Dalakouras (1993, Alexandroupolis), international Volleyball player with Greece men's national volleyball team
- Stavros Stathakis (1987, Alexandroupolis), Greece footballer
- Nikos Alavantas (1959, Orestiada), former international footballer with Greece national football team
- Stefania Liberakaki (2002), Greek-Dutch singer originally from Sofiko, a village near Didymoteicho
