= Dilofos railway station =

Greek railway station

Δίλοφος Dilofos

General information
- Location: Dilofos; Evros; Greece
- Coordinates: 41°41′35″N 26°22′40″E
- Owner: GAIAOSE
- Line: Alexandroupoli–Svilengrad railway
- Platforms: 1
- Tracks: 1
- Train operators: Hellenic Train
- Bus routes: Alexandroupoli Port, Dikaia
- Connections: Bus

Construction
- Structure type: at-grade
- Platform levels: 1
- Parking: No
- Cycle facilities: No

Other information
- Status: Unstaffed
- Website: https://www.ose.gr/en/

History
- Electrified: No

Services
Preceding station	Hellenic Train	Following station
Marasia towards Alexandroupoli	G6 Alexandroupoli-Ormenio	Dikaia towards Ormenio
Location
- Location within Greece

Dilofos railway station (Greek: Σιδηροδρομική Στάση Δίλοφος, romanized: Sidirodromiki stasi Dilofos) is a small unstaffed railway station that serves the village of Dikaia, Evros, in Eastern Macedonia and Thrace, Greece. Located just north of the settlement, Today Hellenic Train operates just two daily regional trains to Alexandroupoli and Ormenio.

== History ==
The railway was an important link during World War I as the Ottoman Empire, Bulgaria, and Austria-Hungary were all Central Allies. After the Ottoman Empire's defeat, its remaining imperial possessions were divided. The sections from Alexandroupoli to Svilengrad, except for a short section of about 10 kilometres (6.2 mi) in Turkey serving Edirne Karaagaç station and for 3 kilometres (1.9 mi) between the Greek border and Svilengrad station in Bulgaria come under the control of the French-Hellenic Railway Company (CFFH), a subsidiary of the CO, when the CFFH was incorporated in July 1929.

Under the Treaty of Lausanne of 1923, a new border between Greece and Turkey was established at the Evros river, just east of Ftelia railway station, which had the result that the railway from Istanbul to Bulgaria entered Greece at Pythio, then re-entered Turkey at Edirne (Karaağaç railway station), re-entered Greece at Marasia, and finally entered Bulgaria between Ormenio and Svilengrad. This arrangement continued until 1971 when two new lines were opened. In Turkey, the Edirne Cut-off was opened to allow trains from Istanbul to Bulgaria to run through Edirne entirely on Turkish territory so that trains such as the Orient Express no longer passed through Feres. In Greece, a line was opened to allow trains from Pythio to Bulgaria to stay on Greek territory and avoid Edirne. In 1954 the CFFH was absorbed by the Hellenic State Railways. In 1971, the Hellenic State Railways was reorganised into the OSE taking over responsibilities for most for Greece's rail infrastructure. In the 1990s, OSE introduced the InterCity service to the Alexandroupoli–Svilengrad line Which reduced travel times across the whole line.

in 2017, limited works were carried out at the station, the buildings were painted, and the platform was paved. In 2020 it was announced that the section of line between Pythio and Ormenio was to be upgraded, at the cost of €1.4 million as part of an ambitious integrated intergovernmental transport plan which will see this, and 39 other transport sector projects be built, with financing from the European Commission with a total of €117 million. The package of measures aims to build or improve transport connections and connectivity across Europe, with a focus on sustainable transport. The project for the Pythian-Ormenio section envisions upgrading the existing line infrastructure and trackbed, doubling of the track as well as the installation of electrification signalling (ETCS Level 1) along the entire stretch, with the aim of improving freight transport with Bulgaria and Turkey.

Following the Tempi crash, Hellenic Train announced rail replacement bus's on certain routes across the Greek rail network, starting Wednesday 15 March 2023.

In August 2025, the Greek Ministry of Infrastructure and Transport confirmed the creation of a new body, Greek Railways (Greek: Σιδηρόδρομοι Ελλάδος, romanized: Ellinikí Sidiródromi Monoprósopi) to assume responsibility for rail infrastructure, planning, modernisation projects, and rolling stock across Greece. Previously, these functions were divided among several state-owned entities: OSE, which managed infrastructure; ERGOSÉ, responsible for modernisation projects; and GAIAOSÉ, which owned stations, buildings, and rolling stock. OSE had overseen both infrastructure and operations until its vertical separation in 2005. Rail safety has been identified as a key priority. The merger follows the July approval of a Parliamentary Bill to restructure the national railway system, a direct response to the Tempi accident of February 2023, in which 43 people died after a head-on collision.

== Facilities ==
The station is housed in its original station building, however this is now closed. Adjoining it is a later 1970s building that houses a waiting shelter. Beside this, the station has no other facilities. The platform, which is long for this region, has no outside seating, Dot-matrix display departure and arrival screens, nor timetable poster boards for passenger information; the station remains little more than an unstaffed halt.

== Services ==
As of 2020, the stop is only served by one daily pair of regional trains Alexandroupoli–Ormenio. There are currently no services to Svilengrad.

The station is also severed by a limited number of regional buses: (as of 2024) Alexandroupoli Port 06:10, Dikaia 18:14 and Alexandroupoli Port 19:12.

As of October 2024 all services are run as a rail-replacement bus service.

== Line layout ==
L Ground/Concourse		Exits
Level; L1	Side platform, doors will open on the right/left
Level; L1	Platform 1a	towards Alexandroupoli (Marasia) ←
Level; L1	Platform 1b	towards Ormenio (Dikaia) →
