= Kastanies railway station =

Railway station in Greece

Καστανιές Kastanies

General information
- Location: Orestiada 680 01; Evros; Greece
- Coordinates: 41.6472867°N 26.4865270°E
- Owner: GAIAOSE
- Line: Alexandroupoli–Svilengrad railway
- Platforms: 1 side platform
- Tracks: 1
- Train operators: Hellenic Train

Construction
- Structure type: at-grade
- Parking: No
- Cycle facilities: No

Other information
- Status: Unstaffed
- Website: http://www.ose.gr/en/

History
- Opened: 1971
- Electrified: No

Services
Preceding station	Hellenic Train	Following station
Nea Vyssa towards Alexandroupoli	G6 Alexandroupoli-Ormenio	Marasia towards Ormenio
Location
- Location within Greece

Kastanies railway station (Greek: Σιδηροδρομική Στάση Καστανέων, romanized: Sidirodromiki Stasi Kastanies) is a railway stop in Kastanies, Greece. It was opened in 1971 by the OSE. It is one of the northernmost railway stops in Greece, close to the Turkish border. lies 1.1 km (0.68 mi) from the village center, down an unnamed road on the edge of the village. The journey from Kastanies to Alexandroupoli takes around 128 mins.

== History ==
The station opened in 1971 as part of Greek efforts to create a passing loop for the CO. The then SEK designed and constructed a 9 km (5.6 mi) direct connection between Nea Vyssa and Marasia within the Greek borders, bypassing Karaağaç. The new line section included Kastanies railway station and a new bridge over the river Ardas. Karaağaç railway station was abandoned, the track lifted and the building converted to other use.

Following the Tempi crash, Hellenic Train announced rail replacement bus's on certain routes across the Greek rail network, starting Wednesday 15 March 2023.

In August 2025, the Greek Ministry of Infrastructure and Transport confirmed the creation of a new body, Greek Railways (Greek: Σιδηρόδρομοι Ελλάδος, romanized: Ellinikí Sidiródromi Monoprósopi) to assume responsibility for rail infrastructure, planning, modernisation projects, and rolling stock across Greece. Previously, these functions were divided among several state-owned entities: OSE, which managed infrastructure; ERGOSÉ, responsible for modernisation projects; and GAIAOSÉ, which owned stations, buildings, and rolling stock. OSE had overseen both infrastructure and operations until its vertical separation in 2005. Rail safety has been identified as a key priority. The merger follows the July approval of a Parliamentary Bill to restructure the national railway system, a direct response to the Tempi accident of February 2023, in which 43 people died after a head-on collision.

== Facilities ==
The stations is equipped solely with a waiting room on the single platform. The unstaffed halt has been the victim of repeated graffiti and vandalism.

== Services ==
As of 2020 the stop is served by only one daily pair of local trains to/from Alexandroupoli. There are currently no services to Svilengrad.

As of October 2024 all services are run as a rail-replacement bus service.

== Stop layout ==
Ground level		Exit
Level; Ε1	Side platform, doors will open on the right/left
Level; Ε1	Platform 1Α	towards Alexandroupoli (Nea Vyssa) →
Level; Ε1	Platform 1Β	towards Ormenio (Marasia) ←
