= Dikaia railway station =

Railway station in Greece

Δίκαια Dikaia

General information
- Location: Epar.Od. Kiprinou - Dikeon; 680 07; Evros; Greece
- Coordinates: 41.7060°N 26.2974°E
- Owner: GAIAOSE
- Line: Alexandroupolis–Svilengrad railway
- Platforms: 2 (1 side platform, 1 island platform)
- Tracks: 2
- Train operators: Hellenic Train

Construction
- Structure type: at-grade

Other information
- Status: Unstaffed

History
- Opened: 1874
- Electrified: No

Services
Preceding station	Hellenic Train	Following station
Dilofos towards Alexandroupoli	G6 Alexandroupoli-Ormenio	Ptelea towards Ormenio
Location
- Location within Greece

Dikaia railway station (Greek: Σιδηροδρομικός Σταθμός Δικαίων, romanized: Sidirodromikos Stathmos Dikeon) is a railway station that serves the village of Dikaia, Evros in Eastern Macedonia and Thrace, Greece. Located less than 900 metres (3,000 ft) east of the centre of Dikaia, the station opened in 1874 by the Chemins de fer Orientaux (now part of OSE). Today TrainOSE operates just four daily regional trains to Alexandroupolis and Ormenio. The station is unstaffed however there are waiting rooms available. It is one of the northernmost operational railway stations in Greece, close to both the Bulgarian and Turkish borders.

== History ==
The station opened in 1874 when the line, built by the Chemins de fer Orientaux, from Istanbul to Vienna opened. The railway reached Dikaia in 1873, when the line from Istanbul to Edirne and Bulgaria was opened. When the railway was built it was all within the Ottoman Empire.

During World War I, the railway was an important link as the Ottoman Empire, Bulgaria and Austria-Hungary were all Central Allies. On 14 December 1916 Allied (British or French, it is not clear), aeroplanes bombed the bridge over the river Evros.

After the Ottoman Empire's defeat, its remaining imperial possessions were divided. The sections from Alexandroupolis to Svilengrad, except for a short section of about 10 kilometres (6.2 mi) in Turkey serving Edirne Karaagaç station and for 3 kilometres (1.9 mi) between the Greek border and Svilengrad station in Bulgaria come under the control of the French-Hellenic Railway Company, a subsidiary of the Chemins de fer Orientaux, when the French-Hellenic was incorporated in July 1929.

Under the Treaty of Lausanne of 1923, a new border between Greece and Turkey was established at the Evros river, just east of Ftelia railway station, which had the result that the railway from Istanbul to Bulgaria entered Greece at Pythio, then re-entered Turkey at Edirne (Karaağaç railway station), re-entered Greece at Marasia, and finally entered Bulgaria between Ormenio and Svilengrad. This arrangement continued until 1971, when two new lines were opened. In Turkey, the Edirne Cut-off was opened to allow trains from Istanbul to Bulgaria to run through Edirne entirely on Turkish territory, so that trains such as the Orient Express no longer passed through Feres. In Greece, a line was opened to allow trains from Pythio to Bulgaria to stay on Greek territory and avoid Edirne. In 1954 the CFFH was absorbed by the Hellenic State Railways. In 1971, the Hellenic State Railways was reorganised into the OSE taking over responsibilities for most for Greece's rail infrastructure.

In the 1990s, OSE introduced the InterCity service to the Alexandroupolis–Svilengrad line Which reduced travel times across the whole line.

In 2020 it was announced that a section of the line between Pythio and Ormenio was to be upgraded at a cost of €1.4 million as part of an ambitious integrated intergovernmental transport plan which will see this, and 39 other transport sector projects be built, with financing from the European Commission with a total of €117 million. The package of measures aims to build or improve transport connections and connectivity across Europe, with a focus on sustainable transport. The project for the Pythian-Ormenio section envisions upgrading the existing line infrastructure and trackbed, doubling of the track as well as the installation of electrification signalling (ETCS Level 1) along the entire stretch, with the aim of improving freight transport with Bulgaria and Turkey.

Following the Tempi crash, Hellenic Train announced rail replacement bus's on certain routes across the Greek rail network, starting Wednesday 15 March 2023.

In August 2025, the Greek Ministry of Infrastructure and Transport confirmed the creation of a new body, Greek Railways (Greek: Σιδηρόδρομοι Ελλάδος, romanized: Ellinikí Sidiródromi Monoprósopi) to assume responsibility for rail infrastructure, planning, modernisation projects, and rolling stock across Greece. Previously, these functions were divided among several state-owned entities: OSE, which managed infrastructure; ERGOSÉ, responsible for modernisation projects; and GAIAOSÉ, which owned stations, buildings, and rolling stock. OSE had overseen both infrastructure and operations until its vertical separation in 2005. Rail safety has been identified as a key priority. The merger follows the July approval of a Parliamentary Bill to restructure the national railway system, a direct response to the Tempi accident of February 2023, in which 43 people died after a head-on collision.

== Facilities ==
The station has no facilities. It is equipped with a small waiting room but little else. The platforms have no outside seating, Dot-matrix display departure and arrival screens or timetable poster boards for passenger information, and the station remains little more than an unstaffed halt.

== Services ==
As of 2020, the station is only served by only one daily pair of regional trains Alexandroupolis–Ormenion. There are currently no services to Svilengrad.

As of October 2024 all services are run as a rail-replacement bus service.

== Station layout ==
L Ground/Concourse		Exits
Level; L1	Side platform, doors will open on the right
Level; L1	Platform 1	towards Ormenio (Ptelea) ←
Level; L1	Platform 2	towards Alexandroupolis (Dilofos) →
Level; L1	Island platform, doors will open on the right
