= Soufli railway station =

Railway station in Greece

Σουφλί Soufli

General information
- Location: Soufli; Evros; Greece
- Coordinates: 41°11′15″N 26°18′06″E
- Owner: GAIAOSE
- Line: Alexandroupoli–Svilengrad railway
- Platforms: 3 (1 disused)
- Tracks: 5 (1 disused, 2 freight)
- Train operators: Hellenic Train

Construction
- Structure type: at-grade
- Platform levels: 1
- Parking: No
- Cycle facilities: No

Other information
- Status: Unstaffed
- Website: http://www.ose.gr/en/

History
- Electrified: No

Services
Preceding station	Hellenic Train	Following station
Lagyna towards Alexandroupoli	G6 Alexandroupoli-Ormenio	Mandra towards Ormenio
Location
- Location within Greece

Soufli railway station (Greek: Σιδηροδρομικός Σουφλί Λαγυνά, romanized: Sidirodromikós stathmós Soufli) is a railway station that serves the village of Soufli, Evros in Eastern Macedonia and Thrace, Greece. Located close to the village center, the station was (when) by the Chemins de fer Orientaux, (now part of OSE). Today Hellenic Train operates just 4 daily Regional trains to Alexandroupoli and Ormenio. The station is unstaffed however there are waiting rooms available. Didymoteicho is one of the northernmost operational railway stations in Greece.

== History ==
The station lies on the line, built by the Chemins de fer Orientaux (CO), from Istanbul to Vienna. The railway reached Lagyna during Ottoman rule, when in 1873, when the line from Istanbul to Edirne and Bulgaria was opened. A 112 km branch from Pythio to Alexandroupoli (then known as Dedeağaç) was opened in 1874. When the railway was built it was all within the Ottoman Empire. After World War I and the subsequent Greek-Turkish War from 1919 to 1922, and finally peace in the form of the Lausanne treaty, the Chemins de fer Orientaux (CO) ended up having a network straddling Turkey and Greece, Didymoteicho became part of Greece and the line administrated by Greece.

In 1920 it became part Hellenic State Railways. On 31 December 1970 Hellenic State Railways ceased to exist; the next day all railways in Greece (with the exception of private industrial lines and E.I.S.) were transferred to Hellenic Railways Organisation S.A., a state-owned corporation. In 2009, with the Greek debt crisis unfolding OSE's Management was forced to reduce services across the network. Timetables were cut back and routs closed as the government-run entity attempted to reduce overheads. Services from Orestiada to Alexandroupoli were cut back to three trains a day, reducing the reliability of services and passenger numbers.

In 2009, with the Greek debt crisis unfolding OSE's Management was forced to reduce services across the network. Timetables were cut back, and routes closed, as the government-run entity attempted to reduce overheads. Services from Feres to Alexandroupoli were cut back to three trains a day, reducing the reliability of services and passenger numbers. With passenger footfall in sharp decline. On 11 February 2011, all cross-border routes were closed and international services (to Istanbul, Sofia, etc.) were ended. Thus, only two routes now connect Feres with Thessaloniki and Athens (and those with a connection to Alex / Polis), while route time increased as the network was "upgraded". Services to/from Ormenio were replaced by bus. In 2014 TrainOSE replaced services to/from Dikaia with buses

On 13 February 2011, due to the Greek financial crisis and subsequent budget cuts by the Greek government, all international services were suspended. As a result, all cross border routes where closed and international services (to Istanbul, Sofia, etc.) ended. Thus, only two routes now connect Soufli with Thessaloniki and Athens (and those with a connection to Alex / Polis), while route time increased as the network was "upgraded".

In February 2015 flooding coursed severe delays across the whole line as points failed and embankments where wash away in and around Soufli. In 2017 OSE's passenger transport sector was privatised as TrainOSE, currently a wholly owned subsidiary of Ferrovie dello Stato Italiane infrastructure, including stations remained under the control of OSE. In July 2022, the station began being served by Hellenic Train, the rebranded TrainOSE.

Following the Tempi crash, Hellenic Train announced rail replacement bus's on certain routes across the Greek rail network, starting Wednesday 15 March 2023.

In August 2025, the Greek Ministry of Infrastructure and Transport confirmed the creation of a new body, Greek Railways (Greek: Σιδηρόδρομοι Ελλάδος, romanized: Ellinikí Sidiródromi Monoprósopi) to assume responsibility for rail infrastructure, planning, modernisation projects, and rolling stock across Greece. Previously, these functions were divided among several state-owned entities: OSE, which managed infrastructure; ERGOSÉ, responsible for modernisation projects; and GAIAOSÉ, which owned stations, buildings, and rolling stock. OSE had overseen both infrastructure and operations until its vertical separation in 2005. Rail safety has been identified as a key priority. The merger follows the July approval of a Parliamentary Bill to restructure the national railway system, a direct response to the Tempi accident of February 2023, in which 43 people died after a head-on collision.

== Facilities ==
As of (2009) the station is unstaffed.

== Services ==
As of 2020, Soufli is only serviced by one daily pair of Regional trains Alexandroupoli–Ormenio

The station is served by two buses to Alexandroupoli Port (07:31 & 20:33) and a single bus to Dikaia (16:52).

Between July 2005 and February 2011 the Friendship Express (an international InterCity train jointly operated by the Turkish State Railways (TCDD) and TrainOSE linking Istanbul's Sirkeci Terminal, Turkey and Thessaloniki, Greece) passed through Lagyna, but did not call at the station.

As of October 2024 all services are run as a rail-replacement bus service.

== Station layout ==
L Ground/Concourse	Customer service	Tickets/Exits
Level; Ε1	Side platform, doors will open on the right
Level; Ε1	Platform 3	In non-regular use
Level; Ε1	Island platform, doors open on the right/left
Level; Ε1	Platform 1	towards Alexandroupoli (Lagyna) ←
Level; Ε1	Island platform, doors to the left
Level; Ε1	Platform 2	towards Ormenio (Mandra) →
