= French-Hellenic Railway Company =

Former railway company in Greece and Turkey

French-Hellenic Railway Co.
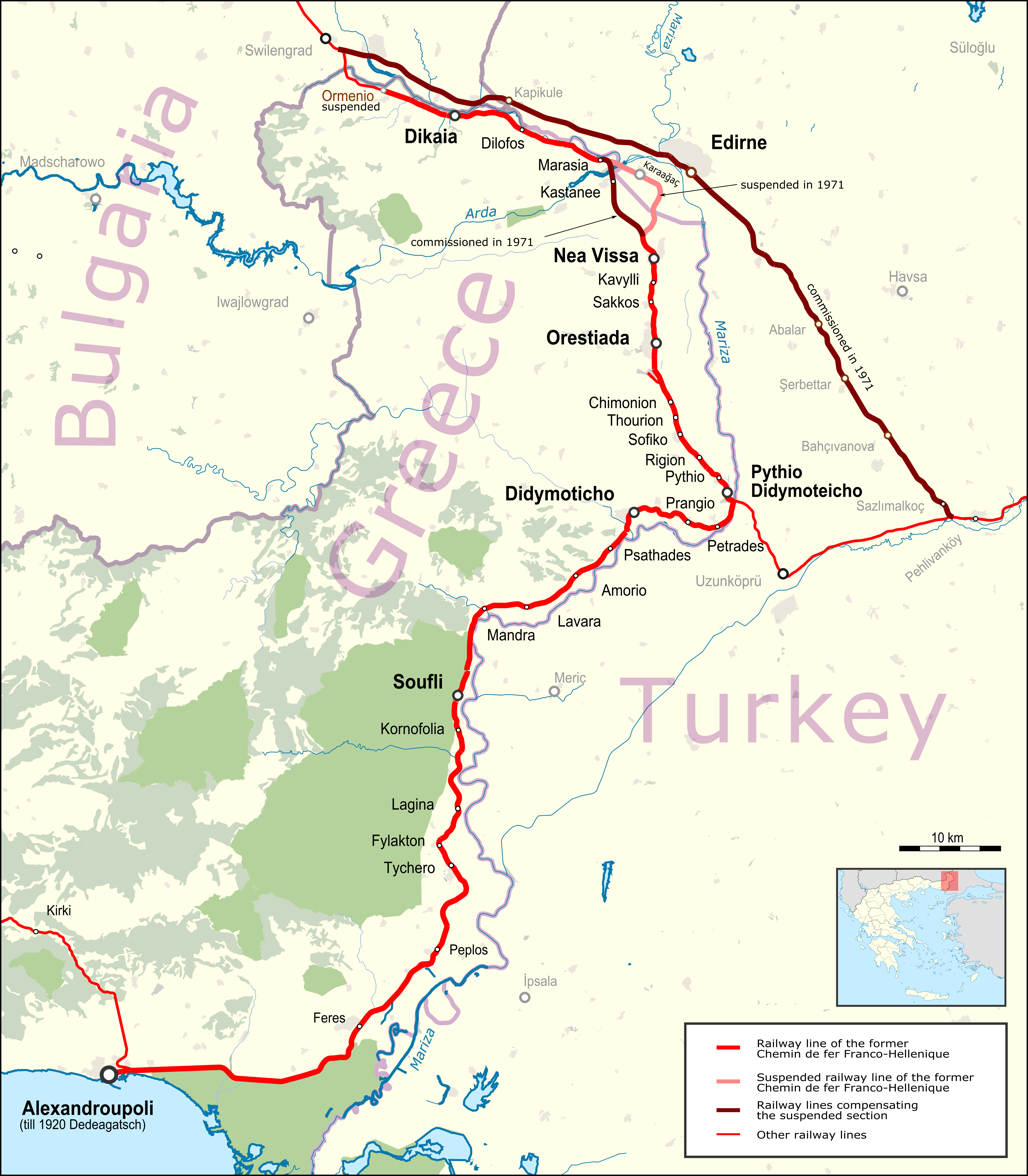
- Map of the line operated by the former French-Hellenic Railway Company as of 2015

Overview
- Main stationss: Dikaia; Edirne; Nea Vissa; Orestiada; Pythio; Didymoteicho; Soufli; Alexandroupoli
- Fleet: 19 steam engines
- Parent company: Chemins de fer Orientaux
- Reporting mark: CFFH

Technical
- Track gauge: 1435 mm
- Length: 173 km (107 mi)

The French-Hellenic Railway Co. (French: Chemin de fer Franco-Hellenique, or CFFH, full name: Cοmpanie franco-hellenique des chemins de fer, Greek: Γαλλοελληνική Εταιρεία Σιδηροδρόμων or ΓΕΣ) was a private railway company in Greece and Turkey which operated the former Chemins de fer Orientaux railway line from Alexandroupolis to Pythio, Ormenio and Svilengrad between 1929 and 1954. The company was absorbed by the Hellenic State Railways state-owned company in 1954.

== History ==
After World War I and the subsequent Greek-Turkish War from 1919 to 1922 and finally peace in the form of the treaty of Lausanne, the Chemins de fer Orientaux (CO) ended up having a network straddling Turkey and Greece. This created operational difficulties, each country having now its own set of rules & regulations, currencies, languages, ... In order to resolve this situation, the CO decided to split itself into two companies: one for the Greek part, one for the Turkish part of the railway.

The CO created the "Compagnie franco-hellenique des chemins de fer" (CFFH) as a subsidiary company. The CFFH was incorporated in July 1929 as a French company with headquarters located in Paris. The CO transferred to the CFFH the Greek part of its line from Alexandroupoli to Svilengrad, except for a short section of about 10km in Turkey serving the Edirne Karaagaç station and for about 3km between the Greek border and Svilengrad station in Bulgaria. Overall, this line was 165km long route from the Aegean Sea port city Alexandroupoli to Ormenio, the last station in Greece before entering Bulgaria. Pythion station was the junction towards Turkey. Along with the infrastructure, the CO transferred also some motive power and rolling stock to the CFFH. The CFFH stock was transferred to CO shareholders on the basis of 1 CFFH stock for every 5 CO stock. These CFFH stock started trading on the market in July 1931.

Regarding the Edirne Karaagaç railway enclave so to speak, the CO retained operating rights over the section Svilengrad to Pythion to be able to reach Edirne and even Svilengrad. On the other hand, the CFFH retained operating rights through the Edirne section of the line to access the Greek part of the line past Edirne, through to Svilengrad. When the Turkish part of the CO was sold to the Turkish railways, these operating rights were also sold, enabling TCDD to reach Edirne with its own motive power, albeit with a CFFH driver. Likewise, when Hellenic State Railways (SEK) took over from the CFFH, they kept the operating right through Edirne Karaagaç. Operational working was facilitated by a provision in the treaty of Lausanne allowing for trains to cross the borders in and out of Karaagaç without border control not custom taxes. These rights survived until 1971 when TCDD inaugurated its own line from Pehlivanköy to Edirne & Svilengrad fully on Turkish territory.

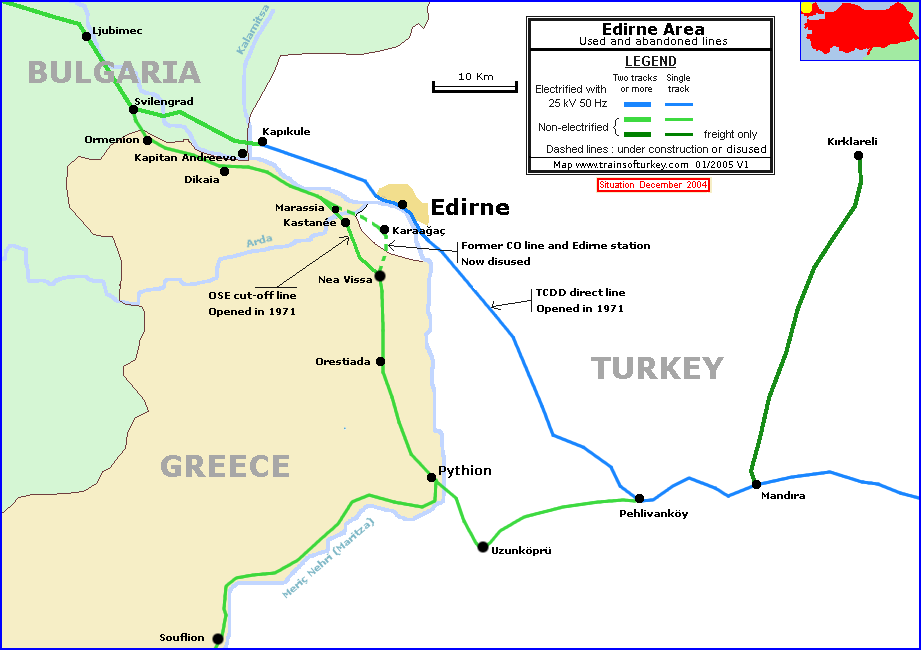
Edirne railway realignement in 1971

At the same time, SEK built a bypass of Edirne also inaugurated in 1971. This bypass was between Marassia and Nea Vyssa, avoiding Turkish territory. The former CO station in Edirne Karaagaç, west of the Maritsa, was no longer served, nor by TCDD nor by SEK and went into disuse.

The CFFH was the only railway connecting Turkey to Europe and enjoyed the related traffic and revenue. Some prestigious trains like the Orient Express transited on CFFH network. Otherwise, the CFFH did not generate any major traffic, either freight or passengers along its line. During the Greek Civil War until 1949, the trains operated only by daylight and were supplemented with empty freight cars in front of the locomotive and armed with escort to protect them from mines. SEK took over operations of the line and rolling stock, effective 1 January 1955, and the CFFH ceased to exist.

== Locomotives ==
The CFFH fleet consisted of some of the engines from the CO. Only 2 engines are known to have been purchased by the CFFH. These are 2 E types engine, originally from the Austrian State railways.

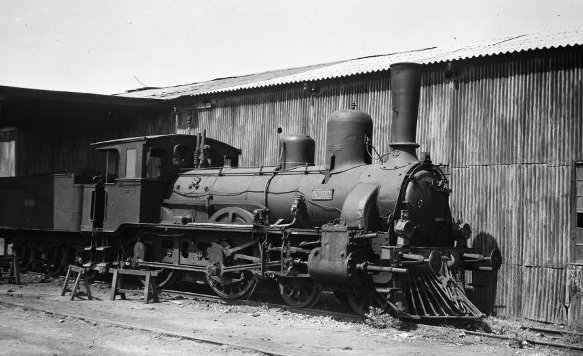
4-4-0 steam locomotive "102" of CFFH at Alexandroupolis

Number	Manufacturer	Qty	Year	Type	Comments	Picture
71–74	Hanomag	4	1912–14	1'C1'	Became SEK class Ζε	
101–110	StEG, Krauss	7	1888–1894	2'B	Silmilar to kkStB 4, became SEK class Γβ	
259–262	Batignolles, Schneider	4	1924–1927	1'D	Became SEK class Ηε	
291, 300	Hanomag	2	1871–75	C	Became SEK class Δβ, Ruse–Varna railway origin	
809–810	kkStB	2	1922	E	Engine type kkStB 80. SEK numbers, CFFH numbers unknowns (if any). These two engines were purchased from SNCF in 1950. SNCF clase 050A, from PLM class 5A. These engine arrived in France as 1st World War reparations. Became SEK class Kβ	

== See also ==
- Chemins de fer Orientaux
- Alexandroupoli–Svilengrad railway
