= Didymoteicho railway station =

Railway station in Greece

Διδυμότειχο Didymoteicho
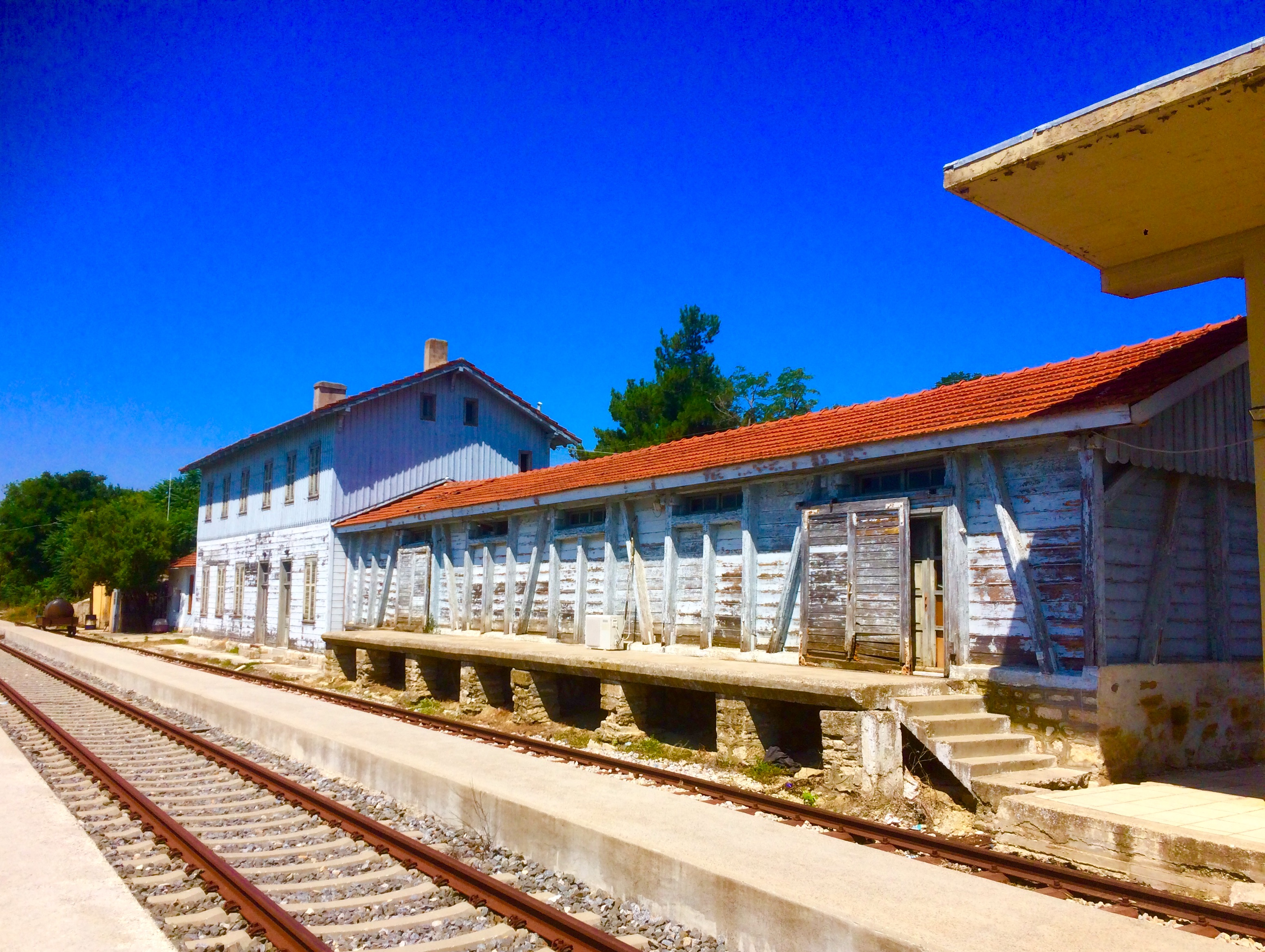
- Didymoteicho old railway station buildings, July 2017

General information
- Location: Didymoteicho; Evros; Greece
- Coordinates: 41°13′01″N 26°18′15″E
- Owner: GAIAOSE
- Line: Alexandroupoli–Svilengrad railway
- Platforms: 3
- Tracks: 4 (1 disused)
- Train operators: Hellenic Train

Construction
- Structure type: at-grade
- Platform levels: 1
- Parking: Yes
- Cycle facilities: No

Other information
- Status: Unstaffed
- Website: ose.gr/en/home/

History
- Electrified: No
- Former names: Demotika

Services
Preceding station	Hellenic Train	Following station
Psathades towards Alexandroupoli	G6 Alexandroupoli-Ormenio	Praggion towards Ormenio
Location
- Location within Greece

Didymoteicho railway station (Greek: Σιδηροδρομικός Σταθμός Διδυμότειχο, romanized: Sidirodromikós stathmós Didimòteicho) is a railway station that serves the town of Didymoteicho, Evros in Eastern Macedonia and Thrace, Greece. Located 2.4 kilometres (1.5 mi) northeast of the town centre, the station was opened in 1870 by the Chemins de fer Orientaux, (now part of OSE). Today Hellenic Train operates just 4 daily Regional trains to Alexandroupoli and Ormenio. The station is unstaffed however there are waiting rooms available The station lies 900 kilometres (560 mi) from Athens and 400 kilometres (250 mi) from Thessaloniki.

== History ==
The station lies on the line built by the Chemins de fer Orientaux (CO), from Istanbul to Vienna. The railway reached Didymoteicho, known as Demotika during Ottoman rule. In 1873, when the line from Istanbul to Edirne and Bulgaria was opened. A 112 kilometres (70 mi) branch from Pythio to Alexandroupoli (then known as Dedeağaç) was opened in 1874. When the railway was built, it was all within the Ottoman Empire. After World War I and the subsequent Greek-Turkish War from 1919 to 1922, and finally peace in the form of the Lausanne treaty, the Chemins de fer Orientaux (CO) ended up having a network straddling Turkey and Greece, Didymoteicho became part of Greece and the line administrated by Greece.

In 1920s, the station became part Franco-Hellenic railway. On 31 December 1970 Hellenic State Railways ceased to exist, the next day all railways in Greece (with the exception of private industrial lines and E.I.S.) were transferred to Hellenic Railways Organisation S.A., a state-owned corporation. In 1986 was created the new railway station of Didymoteicho, was nearby the old station. In 2009, with the Greek debt crisis unfolding OSE's Management was forced to reduce services across the network. Timetables were cut back, and routes closed as the government-run entity attempted to reduce overheads. Services from Orestiada to Alexandroupoli were cut back to three trains a day, reducing the reliability of services and passenger numbers.

On 13 February 2011, all international services were suspended due to the Greek financial crisis and subsequent budget cuts by the Greek government. As a result, all cross border routes were closed and international services (to Istanbul, Sofia, etc.) ended. Thus, only two routes now connect Didymoteicho with Thessaloniki and Athens (and those with a connection to Alex / Polis), while route time increased as the network was "upgraded".

Following the Tempi crash, Hellenic Train announced rail replacement bus's on certain routes across the Greek rail network, starting Wednesday 15 March 2023.

In August 2025, the Greek Ministry of Infrastructure and Transport confirmed the creation of a new body, Greek Railways (Greek: Σιδηρόδρομοι Ελλάδος, romanized: Ellinikí Sidiródromi Monoprósopi) to assume responsibility for rail infrastructure, planning, modernisation projects, and rolling stock across Greece. Previously, these functions were divided among several state-owned entities: OSE, which managed infrastructure; ERGOSÉ, responsible for modernisation projects; and GAIAOSÉ, which owned stations, buildings, and rolling stock. OSE had overseen both infrastructure and operations until its vertical separation in 2005. Rail safety has been identified as a key priority. The merger follows the July approval of a Parliamentary Bill to restructure the national railway system, a direct response to the Tempi accident of February 2023, in which 43 people died after a head-on collision.

The Greek writer and economist Konstantinos Triantaphyllakis visited the station in his youth to watch the train and the musical antics of the station master.

The old train station building features as a Print Designed by Hercules Milas

== Facilities ==
The original station buildings are a beautiful example of late 19th-century railway architecture, but rundown and almost abandoned. A new station complex was built in 1970s adjacent to the original structure, with a ticket office and waiting rooms. As of (2020) the station is unstaffed.

== Services ==
As of 2020, Didymoteicho is only serviced by four daily pairs of Regional trains Alexandroupoli–Ormenio, two of which are express services.

Between July 2005 and February 2011 the Friendship Express (an international InterCity train jointly operated by the Turkish State Railways (TCDD) and TrainOSE linking Istanbul's Sirkeci Terminal, Turkey and Thessaloniki, Greece) passed through Didymoteicho, but did not call at the station.

As of October 2024 all services are run as a rail-replacement bus service.

== Station layout ==
L Ground/Concourse	Customer service	Tickets/Exits
Level; Ε1	Side platform, doors will open on the right
Level; Ε1	Platform 3	In non-regular use
Level; Ε1	Island platform, doors open on the right/left
Level; Ε1	Platform 1	towards Alexandroupoli (Mandra) ←
Level; Ε1	Island platform, doors to the left
Level; Ε1	Platform 2	towards Ormenio (Prangio) →

== Gallery ==
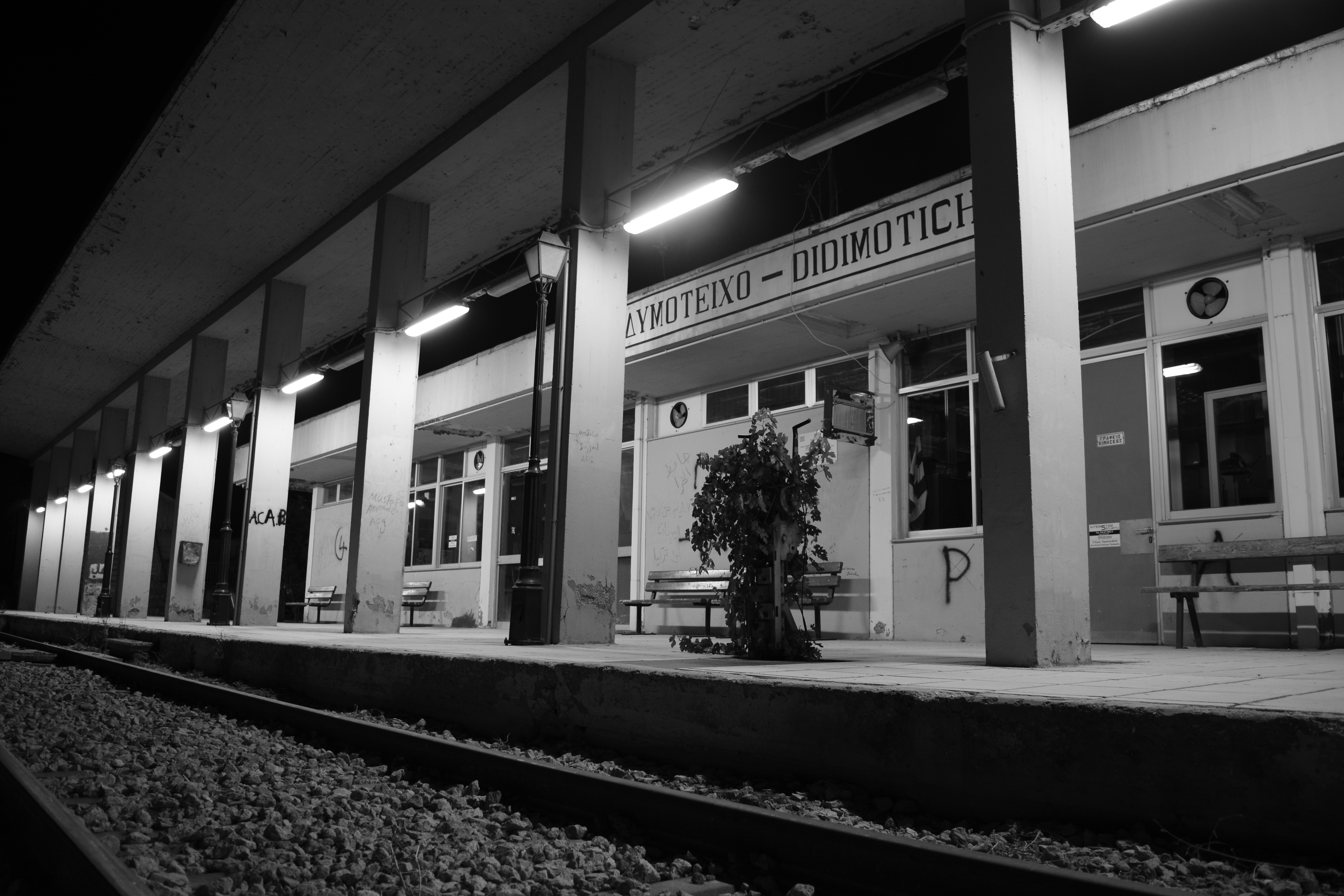
Didymoteicho new railway station new building and platform 1, 2018
