= Orestiada railway station =

Railway station in Greece

Ορεστιάδα Orestiada
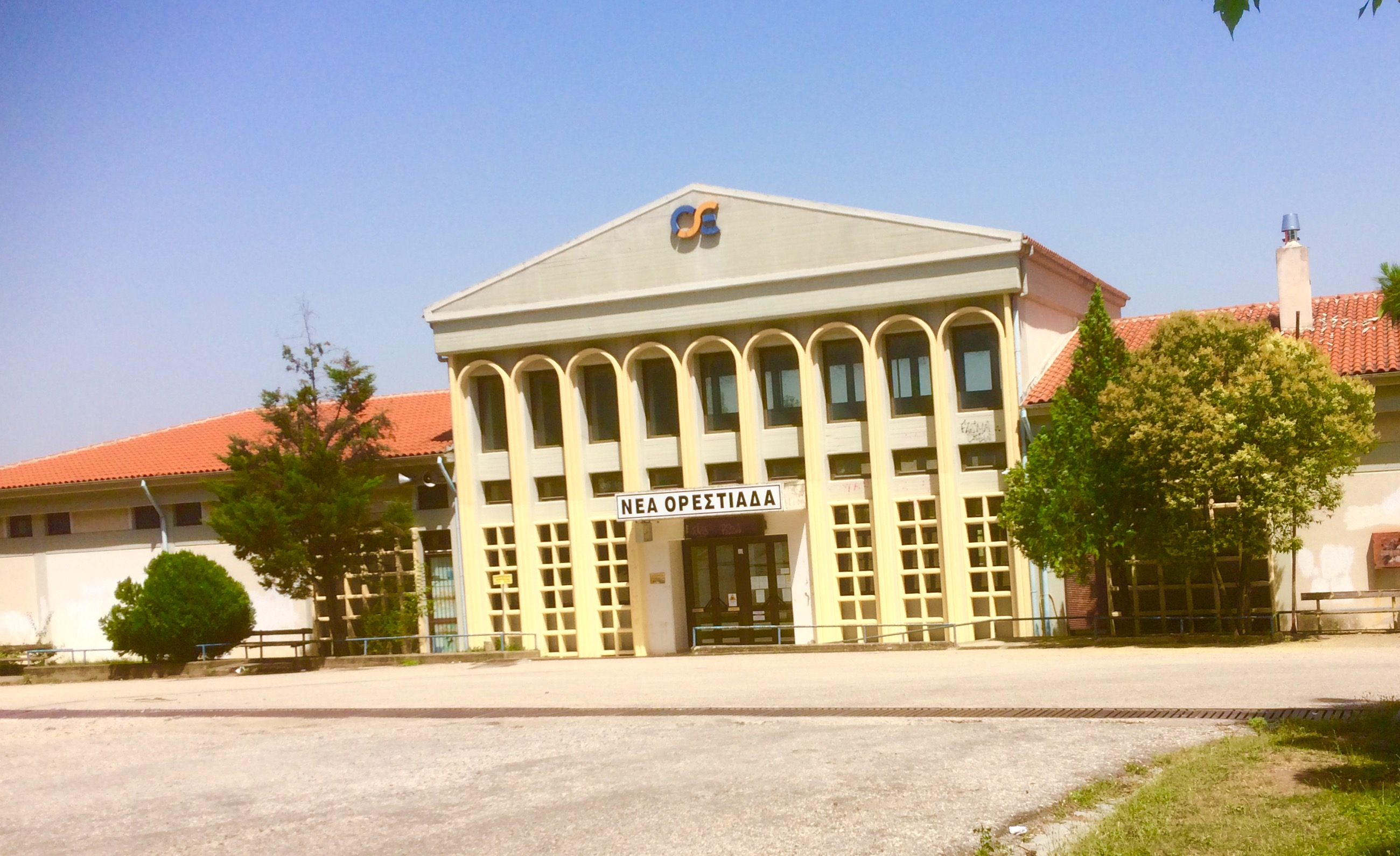
- Orestiada railway station buildings, July 2017

General information
- Location: Orestiada 682 00; Evros; Greece
- Coordinates: 41°30′11″N 26°32′14″E
- Owner: GAIAOSE
- Line: Alexandroupoli–Svilengrad railway
- Platforms: 3
- Tracks: 4
- Train operators: Hellenic Train

Construction
- Structure type: at-grade
- Platform levels: 1

Other information
- Status: Unstaffed

History
- Opened: 16 September 1996; 29 years ago
- Electrified: No

Services
Preceding station	Hellenic Train	Following station
Cheimonio towards Alexandroupoli	G6 Alexandroupoli-Ormenio	Sakkos towards Ormenio
Location
- Location within Greece

Orestiada railway station (Greek: Σιδηροδρομικός Σταθμός Ορεστιάδας, romanized: Sidirodromikos Stathmos Orestiádas) is a railway station that serves the town of Orestiada, in Evros, in Eastern Macedonia and Thrace, Greece. Located 1.8 kilometres (1.1 mi) from the centre of Orestiada, on the eastern edge of the town. The station was open by OSE in 1996, at a cost of €4.5 million. Today TrainOSE operates just 4 daily Regional trains to Alexandroupoli. The station is unstaffed however there are waiting rooms available.

== History ==
The station was built the mid-1990s to replace an older station (built in 1928) and was officially inaugurated on 16 September 1996. At the time, the line saw a large amount of commercial and passenger traffic and was the fourth busiest and third largest station in Northern Greece. In 2009, with the Greek debt crisis unfolding OSE's Management was forced to reduce services across the network. Timetables were cut back, and routes closed as the government-run entity attempted to reduce overheads. Services from Orestiada to Alexandroupoli were cut back to three trains a day, reducing the reliability of services and passenger numbers. With passenger footfall in sharp decline, the station building was closed and mothballed less than 15 years after it first opened. On 11 February 2011, all cross-border routes were closed and international services (to Istanbul, Sofia, etc.) were ended.

With usage down, the station suffered repeated attacks from vandalism, with the station clock and the Greek flag stolen, and the walls covered in graffiti. The canopies became shelters for immigrants entering from Turkey, the overpass filled syringes, even some broken windows and benches. However, the main building was left secured. In 2014, the station building was refurbished and reopened after being closed for 3 years.

Following the Tempi crash, Hellenic Train announced rail replacement bus's on certain routes across the Greek rail network, starting Wednesday 15 March 2023.

In August 2025, the Greek Ministry of Infrastructure and Transport confirmed the creation of a new body, Greek Railways (Greek: Σιδηρόδρομοι Ελλάδος, romanized: Ellinikí Sidiródromi Monoprósopi) to assume responsibility for rail infrastructure, planning, modernisation projects, and rolling stock across Greece. Previously, these functions were divided among several state-owned entities: OSE, which managed infrastructure; ERGOSÉ, responsible for modernisation projects; and GAIAOSÉ, which owned stations, buildings, and rolling stock. OSE had overseen both infrastructure and operations until its vertical separation in 2005. Rail safety has been identified as a key priority. The merger follows the July approval of a Parliamentary Bill to restructure the national railway system, a direct response to the Tempi accident of February 2023, in which 43 people died after a head-on collision.

== Facilities ==
Now the station is unstaffed and the waiting rooms are closed. The entrance is equipped with wheelchair ramps and parking in the forecourt.

== Services ==
As of 2020, the station is only served by one daily pair of regional trains, Alexandroupoli–Ormenio.

As of October 2024 all services are run as a rail-replacement bus service.
