= Egnatia Railway =

Planned railway line in Greece

Overview
- Status: Planned
- Owner: OSE
- Locale: Greece
- Termini: Alexandroupoli; Igoumenitsa

Service
- Type: Higher-speed rail
- Operator: Hellenic Train

Technical
- Line length: 565 km (351 mi)
- Number of tracks: Double track throughout
- Track gauge: 1,435 mm (4 ft 8 1/2 in) standard gauge

Egnatia Railway is a planned railway line between Alexandroupolis and Igoumenitsa in northern Greece. The project is planned to include existing track upgrades as well as new track. The projected cost of this project is €10 billion.

== Background ==
The Egnatia Railway consists of multiple smaller scale projects:

- the line from Alexandroupolis to Thessaloniki: electrification and installation of advanced signaling and telecommunication systems, wherever necessary, and new routing in selected subsections. This includes a section of new track from Xanthi to Thessaloniki via Kavala (projected to cost €1.25 billion), which will shorten the journey between the two by three hours.
- Thessaloniki-Kozani: electrification and signaling,
- Kozani-Krystallopigi: electrification and signaling, construction of new line for the subsection Florina–Krystallopigi,
- Kozani-Igoumenitsa: new line construction via Ioannina to connect with Igoumenitsa Port.

== Planning ==
Between 2017 and 2020 the project design of the Thessaloniki-Amfipoli-Kavala section was completed . A new rail line was planned as a single line with potential for being doubled in future. The new line has design speed of 200 km/h and total length of 174 km, including 9 km bridges and 22 km tunnels. The environmental assessment of the Thessaloniki - Nea Karvali section was announced ready and approved on 14 March 2022. The section length is 206 km with allocated budget of 1,68 billion euros.

As of 2022, the feasibility studies of the Kalambaka-Ioannina-Igoumenitsa section were still on-going. A new line of approximately 154 km was planned, having a design speed of 160 km/h, electrification, ETCS signaling and remote control.

== Construction ==
In 2019, Hellenic Railways Organisation awarded the contract to build the initial 31.8 km (19.8 mi) section between Xanthi and Kavala at a cost of €250 million.

In December 2021, ERGOSE SA published a tender note for the construction of the line between Thessaloniki and Toxotes railway station. Deadline for submission of expressions of interest is set at 14/01/2022. Three companies enlisted to participate.

== Costs ==
The cost is estimated at €10bn but the final cost will be determined when studies completed. The project cost break down:

- Thessaloniki-Alexandroupolis: €1,8bn (Section Alexandroupolis – Xanthi, €300m, Section Xanthi – Kavala – Thessaloniki, €1,5bn)
- Thessaloniki-Kozani: €800m
- Kozani-Igoumenitsa (incl. c) Kozani - Krystallopigi - Florina): €7,4bn

The proposed business model is that of a PPP. The construction and operation of the project will be undertaken by a Special Purpose Vehicle (SPV). Sources of revenues include rail exploitation and logistics services revenues. The funding will be from the European Fund for Strategic Investments (EFSI), and probably from EIB and EU programmes.

In 2023 the cost of the new 206 km railway line to Toxotes was estimated to €1,68 billion

== Other projects ==
A link from Krystallopigi into Albania is also proposed.

The planned overhaul of the Alexandroupoli–Svilengrad railway aims to ensure link of the Egnatia Railway with the Sea2Sea railway corridor.

== See also ==
- P.A.Th.E./P.
- Alexandroupoli–Svilengrad railway
- Thessaloniki–Alexandroupolis railway
