= André Langrand-Dumonceau =

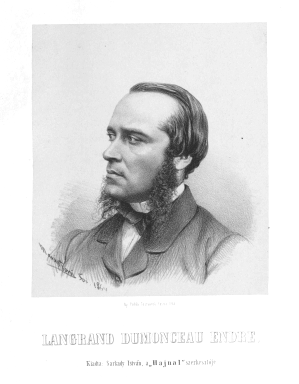
André Langrand-Dumonceau, etching

André Langrand-Dumonceau (1826–1900) was a Belgian financier, banker and entrepreneur and a major figure in European financial world of the 1860s.

He was born in 1826 in Vossem, now part of Belgium, but then part of the United Kingdom of the Netherlands until Belgian independence. He started his career in financial services, helped by his elder brother, who worked for a Belgian branch of a French insurance company. By the age of 36 he was in control of eleven companies across Europe.

He was involved in an attempt to build a "Catholic financial empire", a counterweight to the perceived Jewish dominance of the financial sector. He received international recognition, including a title of count at the Papal court, and "an international reputation as a financial genius". His fortune collapsed in the late 1860s, triggering a major financial-political scandal in Belgium.

During the period from the 1850s to 1870 he was involved with managing over twenty companies, including banks, and insurance and railway companies, a number of which he had founded; including Royale Belge. He received backing from a number of notable figures, including Pope Pius IX, Emperor Franz Joseph of Austria, Napoleon III of France, and King Leopold of Belgium.

His financial plan, however, was unsound, being built on using one company's equity capital to take up the loan capital of another. By the late 1860s, the strain of fund transfers on his network became too much to bear. In the financial Crash of 1870 he declared personal bankruptcy and fled into exile; he was accused of theft, bribery and criminal recklessness, and was condemned in absentia after a trial that ran from 1872 to 1879. He died in Rome in 1900.
