= Alexandroupolis–Svilengrad railway =

Railway connecting Alexandropoulis, Greece and Svilengrad, Bulgaria

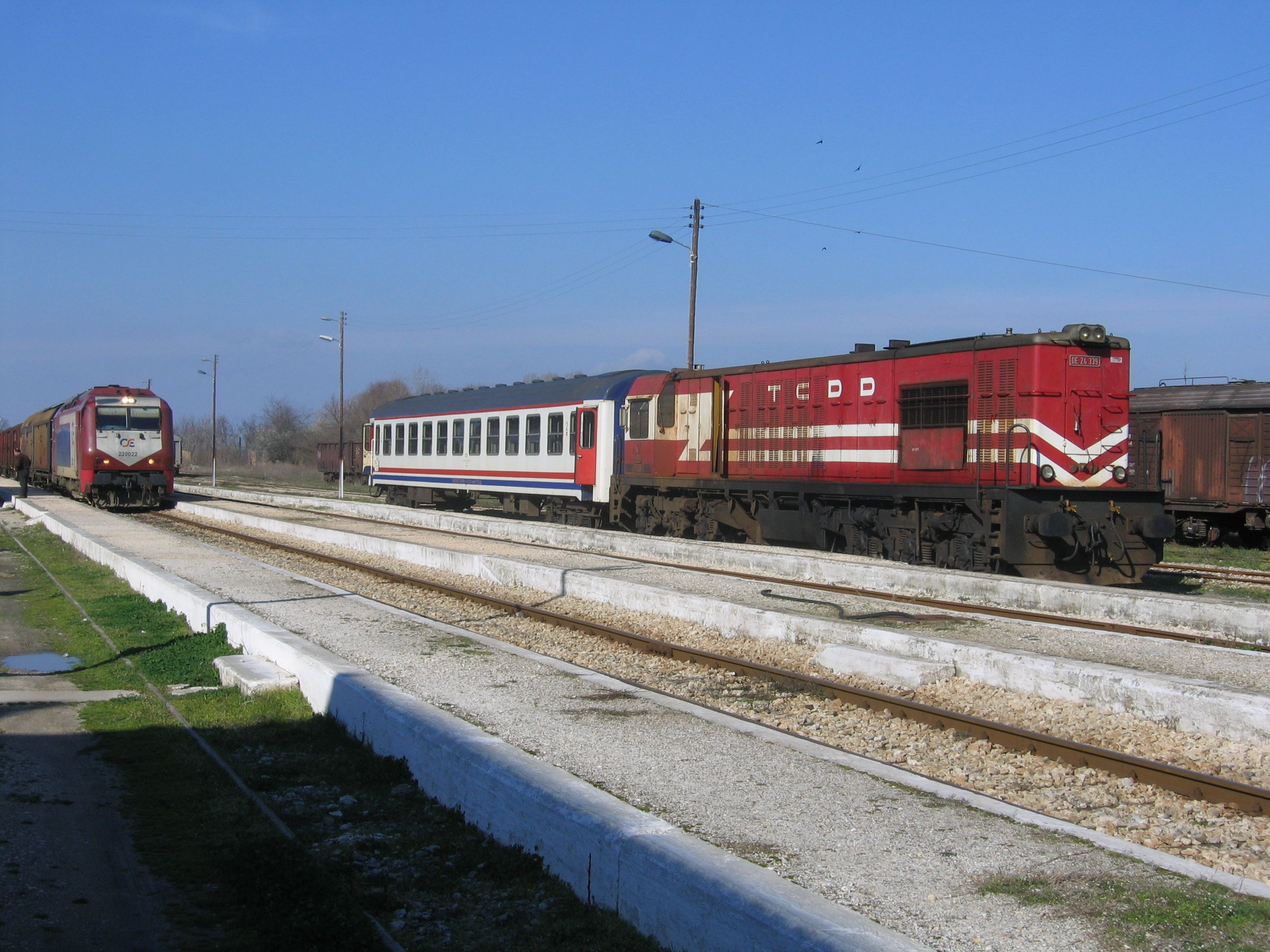
- Pythion railway station (27 March 2007)

Overview
- Status: Operational up to Dikaia
- Owner: GAIAOSE
- Line number: G6
- Locale: Greece (East Macedonia and Thrace), Bulgaria (Haskovo Province)
- Termini: Alexandroupolis 40.8451°N 25.8793°E; Svilengrad 41.7734°N 26.1451°E
- Stations: 29

Service
- Type: Regional rail
- Services: Regional (formally Intercity)
- Operator: Hellenic Train

History
- Opened: 1874

Technical
- Line length: 178.5 km (110.9 mi)
- Track length: 165 km (103 mi) (before 1971)
- Character: Secondary
- Track gauge: 1,435 mm (4 ft 8 1/2 in) standard gauge
- Electrification: no
- Operating speed: 90 km/h (56 mph) (average)

The Alexandroupolis–Svilengrad railway (Greek: Σιδηροδρομική γραμμή Αλεξανδρούπολης - Σβίλενγκραντ, romanized: Sidiródromos Alexandroúpolis-Svílen'nkrant) is a 178.5-kilometre (110.9 mi) long railway connecting the port of Alexandroupolis in Eastern Macedonia and Thrace, Greece with Svilengrad in Bulgaria, via the village of Ormenio. Despite its name, as of 2020 there is only passenger service on the section on Greek territory, between Alexandroupolis and Ormenio, as the international services to Sofia (via Svilengrad) and Istanbul ("Friendship Express") have been suspended as of 2011.

== Course ==
The southern terminus of the Alexandroupolis–Svilengrad railway is Alexandroupolis railway station. About 30 km east of Alexandroupolid the line starts following the river Evros upstream on its right bank. At Pythio, between Didymoteicho and Orestiada, the line to Istanbul branches off. It reaches Ormenio, the current terminus of all passenger services, shortly before crossing the Bulgarian border and continuing to Svilengrad, where it joins the railway from Sofia to Istanbul.

== History ==
The section between Alexandroupolis (formerly Dedeagatch) and Svilengrad was opened in 1873 by the Chemins de fer Orientaux (CO) when the entire Thrace was part of the Ottoman Empire. The part between Pythio and Svilengrad was part of the CO main line from Istanbul to western Europe. After World War I and the subsequent Greek-Turkish War from 1919 to 1922, and finally peace in the form of the Lausanne treaty, the Chemins de fer Orientaux (CO) ended up having a network straddling Turkey and Greece. This created operational difficulties, each country having now its own set of rules and regulations, currencies, and languages. In order to resolve this situation, the CO decided to split itself into two companies: one for the Greek part, one for the Turkish part of the railway.

After the Treaty of Lausanne was signed in 1923 and the borders between Greece and Turkey were drawn, the line was in Greek territory with the exception of a 10 km (6.2 mi) long section from Nea Vyssa to Marasia via Karaağaç that was in Turkey. In order to get from Alexandroupolis to Dikaia, Ormenio and Svilengrad in Bulgaria, trains of the French-Hellenic Railway Company (Chemin de fer Franco-Hellenique) and later of the Hellenic State Railways would travel through Turkish territory. Trains stopped at Karaağaç, which in Greek timetables was listed as Αδριανούπολις (Adrianoupolis)/Edirne.

In July 1929, the CO created the "Companie franco-hellenique des chemins de fer" (CFFH) or The French-Hellenic Railways Company (G.Ε.S.) as a subsidiary company to undertake the completion of the Alexandroupolis-Svilengrad section of the former Eastern Railways, its headquarters was located in Paris. The CO transferred to the CFFH the Greek part of its line from Alexandroupolis to Svilengrad, except for a short section of about 10 km in Turkey serving Edirne Karaagaç station and for about 3 km between the Greek border and Svilengrad station in Bulgaria. Overall, this line was 165 km long route from the Aegean Sea port city Alexandroupolis to Ormenio the last station in Greece before entering Bulgaria. Pythion station was the junction towards Turkey. Along with the infrastructure, the CO also transferred some motive power and rolling stock to the CFFH. The CFFH stock was transferred to CO shareholders on the basis of 1 CFFH stock for every 5 CO stock. These CFFH stock started trading on the market in July 1931.

Regarding the Edirne Karaagaç railway enclave so to speak, the CO retained operating rights over the section Svilengrad to Pythion to be able to reach Edirne and even Svilengrad. On the other hand, the CFFH retained operating rights through the Edirne section of the line to access the Greek part of the line past Edirne, through to Svilengrad. When the Turkish part of the CO was sold to the Turkish railways, these operating rights were also sold, enabling TCDD to reach Edirne with its own motive power, albeit with a CFFH driver. Likewise, when Greek State Railways (SEK) took over from the CFFH, they kept the operating right through Edirne Karaagaç. Operational working was facilitated by a provision in the Lausanne treaty allowing for trains to cross the borders in and out of Karaağaç without border control not custom taxes. These rights survived until 1971 when TCDD inaugurated its own line from Pehlivanköy to Edirne & Svilengrad fully on Turkish territory.

=== Realaignment in 1970s ===
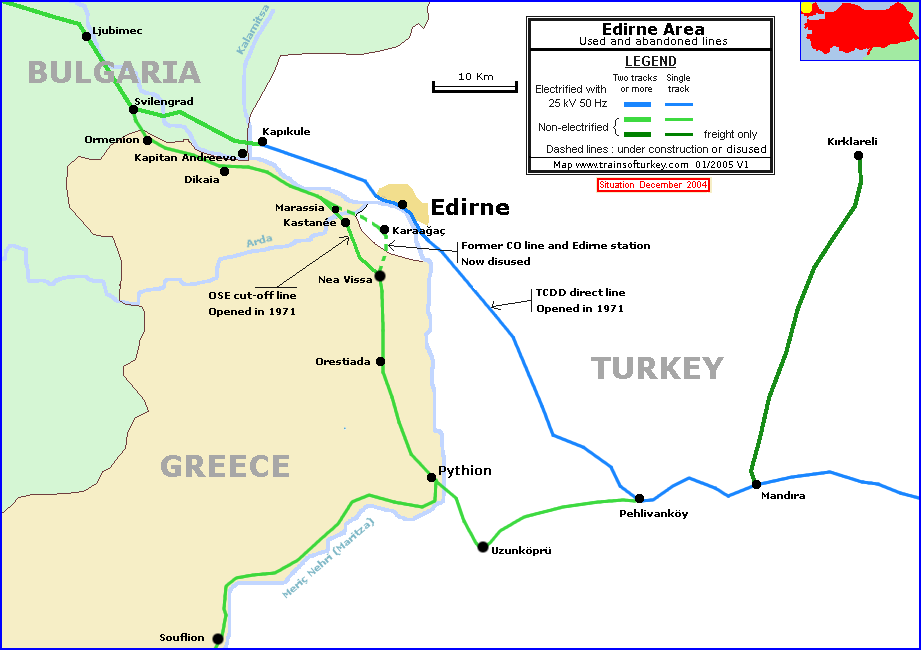
Edirne railway realignement in 1971

At the same time, in 1971, SEK designed and constructed a 9 km (5.6 mi) direct connection between Nea Vyssa and Marasia within the Greek borders, thus avoiding Turkish territory and bypassing Karaağaç and with a new intermediate station at Kastanies. The new passing loop section, which includes a new bridge over the river Ardas is still in use. Arda's bridge was the biggest railway bridge in Greece. The former CO station in Edirne Karaağaç, west of the Maritsa, was not no longer served by either TCDD or by SEK and went into disuse. The tracks lifted and the building converted to other use.

The CFFH was the only railway connecting Turkey to Europe and enjoyed the related traffic and revenue. Some prestigious trains like the Orient Express transited on CFFH network. Otherwise, the CFFH did not generate any major traffic, either freight or passengers along its line. During the Greek Civil War until 1949, the trains operated only by daylight and were supplemented with empty freight cars in front of the locomotive and armed with escort to protect them from mines. SEK took over operations of the line and rolling stock, effective 1 January 1955, and CFFH ceased.

=== Upgrades in 21st century ===
In 2020 it was announced that section of line between Pythion and Ormenio was to be upgraded, at a cost of €1.4m as part of an ambitious integrated intergovernmental transport plan which will see this, and 39 other transport sector projects be built, with financing from the European Commission with a total of €117 million. Some €2,77 million of that budget is allocated for feasibility study of the 62 km section. The package of measures aims to build or improve transport connections and connectivity across Europe, with a focus on sustainable transport. The project at the Pythion-Ormenio section envisions upgrading the existing line and the construction of a second one, as well as the installation of electrification signalling (ETCS Level 1) along the entire stretch, with the aim of improving freight transport with Bulgaria and Turkey.

Major overhaul including electrification and signaling upgrades was proposed in 2021 as one of the six railway projects of the Greek authorities submitted before the EU. In December 2021, ERGOSE SA published a tender note regarding the upgrade of the line between Alexandroupolis and Ormenio. The upgrade includes upgrade and doubling of the line, electrification and installation of ETCS signalling system. Deadline for submission of expressions of interest is set at 14/01/2022. The allocated budget was €1.08 billion euros, as of 2023. In July 2024 the EU Cohesion Fund approved €187 million euros for the line's overhaul. As of 2026 no tender was awarded and was yet to move into the tendering phase, with secured funding of €720 million from CEF 2021–2027.

The planned overhaul of the railway will provide a fast link between the Egnatia Railway and the other sections of the Sea2Sea railway corridor.

== Main stations ==
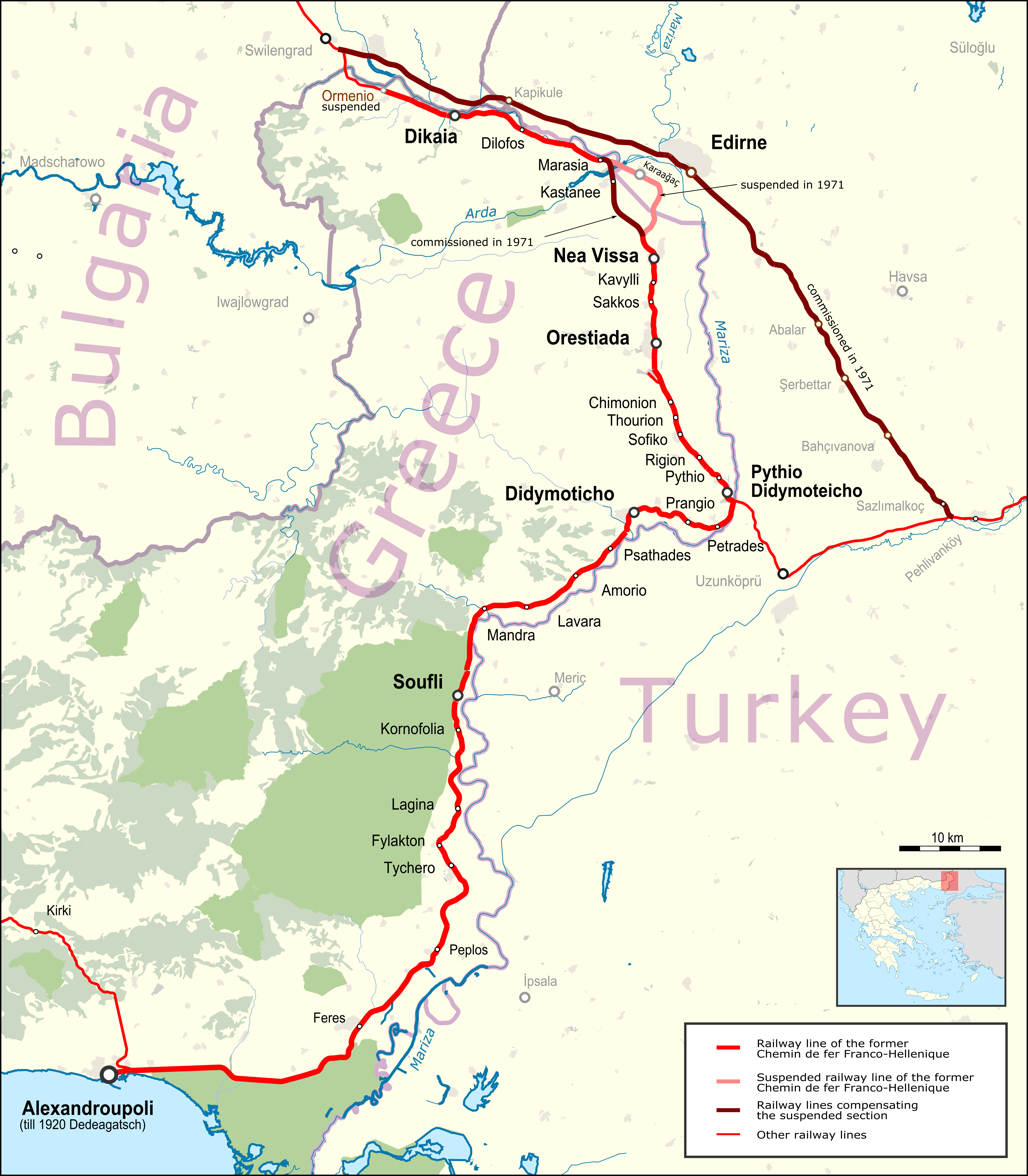
Map of the line in the state of 2015

The stations on the Alexandroupolis–Svilengrad railway are:

- Alexandroupolis railway station
- Feres railway station
- Peplos railway station
- Tychero railway station
- Lagyna railway station
- Soufli railway station
- Lavara railway station
- Didymoteicho railway station
- Pythion railway station
- Chimonio railway station
- Orestiada railway station
- Nea Vyssa railway station
- Dikaia railway station
- Ormenio railway station
- Svilengrad railway station

== Services ==
As of 2020, the Alexandroupolis–Svilengrad railway is only used by four daily pairs of local trains Alexandroupolis–Ormenio, two of which are express services.

== See also ==
- Chemins de fer Orientaux
- Chemins de Fer Franco Hellenique
- Egnatia Railway
