= Nea Vyssa =

Nea Vyssa Νέα Βύσσα
- Community
- Location within Greece
- Coordinates: 41°35′N 26°32′E
- Country: Greece
- Administrative region: East Macedonia and Thrace
- Regional unit: Evros
- Municipality: Orestiada
- Municipal unit: Vyssa

Population (2021)
  - Community: 1,679
- Time zone: UTC+2 (EET)
  - Summer (DST): UTC+3 (EEST)

Nea Vyssa (Greek: Νέα Βύσσα) is a village in the northeastern part of the Evros regional unit in Greece. It was the seat of the municipality of Vyssa until 2011. It is situated near the border with Turkey and the river Evros, about halfway between Orestiada and Edirne in Turkey. The nearest villages are Kavyli to the southwest, and Kastanies to the northwest.

== History ==
The name of the village under Ottoman rule was Achirkioi (Greek: Αχυροχώρι - Achyrochori/ Bulgarian: Ахоркьой). After the Greco-Turkish War (1919-1922) Greek refugees from the village Vyssa (now Bosna, 4 km to the north in Turkey) settled in Achyrochori. It was renamed to Nea Vyssa in 1932. The origin of the name Vyssa may be the Thracian tribe of Bessoi. The family of mathematician Constantin Carathéodory was from old Vyssa. In 1971, OSE, in a bid to avoid using the Edirne curve, built a cut off line just north of the village. Today, trains still call at Ormenio, and other stations to the north of Nea Vyssa, but no long use Karaağaç, which has since closed.

== Population ==
Year	Population
1981	3,935
1991	3,302
2001	2,844
2011	2,805
2021	1,679

== Transport ==
The village is served by the station Vyssa on the Alexandroupoli–Svilengrad Line, with services to Alexandroupoli and Ormenio.

== See also ==
- List of settlements in the Evros regional unit
