= Alexandroupolis railway station =

Railway station in Greece

Αλεξανδρούπολη Alexandroupolis
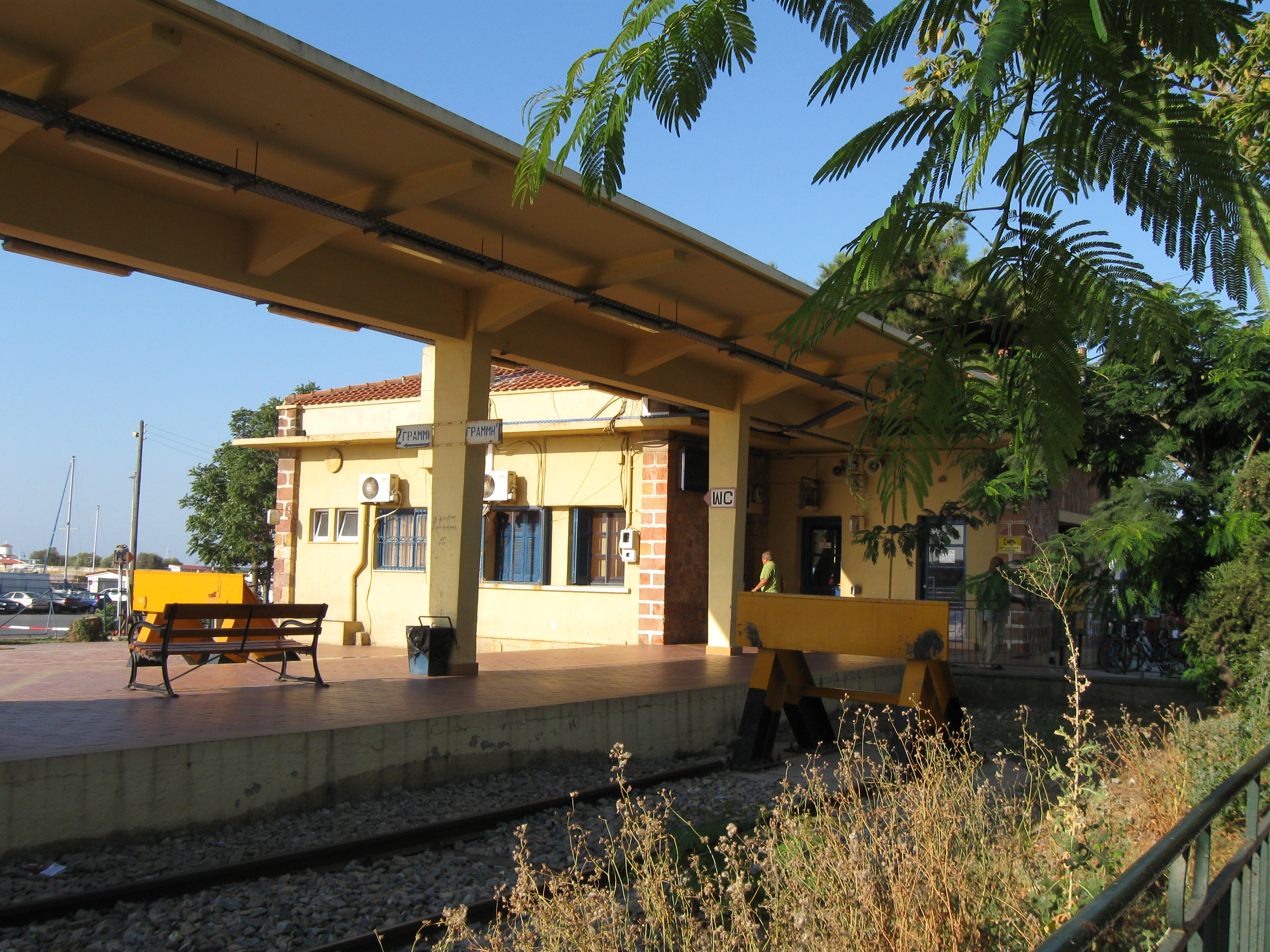
- Alexandroupolis station July 2012

General information
- Location: Alexandroupolis; Evros; Greece
- Coordinates: 40°50′42″N 25°52′45″E
- Owner: GAIAOSE
- Lines: Alexandroupolis–Svilengrad railway; Thessaloniki–Alexandroupolis railway
- Platforms: 2
- Tracks: 3
- Train operators: Hellenic Train

Construction
- Structure type: at-grade
- Platform levels: 1
- Parking: Yes
- Cycle facilities: Yes

Other information
- Status: Operational
- Website: http://www.ose.gr/en/

History
- Opened: 1874
- Rebuilt: 1958
- Electrified: No

Services
Preceding station	Hellenic Train	Following station
Terminus	G6 Alexandroupoli-Ormenio	Feres towards Ormenio
Former and suspended services
Preceding station	Hellenic Train	Following station
Kirki towards Thessaloniki	InterCity Thessaloniki–Alexandroupoli	Terminus
Preceding station	Turkish State Railways	Following station
Komotini towards Thessaloniki	Friendship Express	Pythion towards Istanbul
Location
- Location within Greece

Alexandroupolis railway station or Alexandroupolis Port railway station (Greek: Σιδηροδρομικός Σταθμός Λιμένα Αλεξανδρούπολης, romanized: Sidirodromikos Stathmos Limena Alexandroupolis) is the main railway station of Alexandroupolis in Eastern Macedonia and Thrace, Greece. Built in the 1950s to combine the city's then-two stations, the current station is located in the city centre and acts as an interchange for services to Ormenio and Thessaloniki. Trains approaching from Thessaloniki must reverse for a few hundred meters to reach the station.

== History ==
The central "French" station was opened in 1874, two years after the line from Alexandroupolis (then Dedeagac) to Istanbul via Edirne was completed. Built by the Chemins de fer Orientaux (CO), from Istanbul to Vienna. The railway reached Ftelia in 1873 when the line from Istanbul to Edirne and Bulgaria was opened. When the first station was built, the local rail network was self-contained within the Ottoman Empire. The "Poleos" Station would open later. Until 1909 there was no connection between the lines Istanbul–Alexandroupolis and Thessaloniki–Alexandroupolis (opened in 1896) at Alexandroupolis; a connection existed between Feres and Potamos (near current Avas).

During World War I, the railway was an important link for moving troops and equipment, as the Ottoman Empire, Bulgaria, and Austria-Hungary were all Central Allies. Following the defeat of the Ottoman Empire, its remaining imperial possessions were divided. The sections from Alexandroupolis to Svilengrad, except for a short section of about 10 kilometres (6.2 mi) in Turkey serving Edirne Karaagaç station and for 3 kilometres (1.9 mi) between the Greek border and Svilengrad station in Bulgaria come under the control of the French-Hellenic Railway Company (CFFH), a subsidiary of the CO, when the CFFH was incorporated in July 1929.

Under the Treaty of Lausanne of 1923, a new border between Greece and Turkey was established at the Evros river, just east of Ftelia railway station, which had the result that the railway from Istanbul to Bulgaria entered Greece at Pythion, then re-entered Turkey at Edirne (Karaağaç railway station), re-entered Greece at Marasia, and finally entered Bulgaria between Ormenio and Svilengrad. This arrangement continued until 1971 when two new lines were opened. In Turkey, the Edirne Cut-off was opened to allow trains from Istanbul to Bulgaria to run through Edirne entirely on Turkish territory so that trains such as the Orient Express no longer passed through Ormenio. In Greece, a line was opened to allow trains from Pythion to Bulgaria to stay on Greek territory and avoid Edirne. In 1954 the CFFH was absorbed by the Hellenic State Railways.

29 April 1954 Alexandroupolis Railway Station was the setting for a formal visit by King Paul and then Prince Constantine. In 1958 the station was rebuilt in a more modern style. The following year, the station saw the arrival of German, the Patriarch of Serbia.

In 1971, the Hellenic State Railways was reorganised into the OSE taking over responsibilities for most of Greece's rail infrastructure. In the 1990s, OSE introduced the InterCity service to the Alexandroupolis–Svilengrad line Which reduced travel times across the whole line.

In 2001 the infrastructure element of OSE was created, known as GAIAOSE; it would henceforth be responsible for the maintenance of stations, bridges and other elements of the network, as well as the leasing and the sale of railway assists. In 2005, TrainOSE was created as a brand within OSE to concentrate on rail services and passenger interface. In 2009, with the Greek debt crisis unfolding OSE's Management was forced to reduce services across the network. Timetables were cut back, and routes closed as the government-run entity attempted to reduce overheads. Services from Feres to Alexandroupolis were cut back to three trains a day, reducing the reliability of services and passenger numbers. With passenger footfall in sharp decline. On 11 February 2011, all cross-border routes were closed, and international services (to Istanbul, Sofia, etc.) were ended. Thus, only two routes now connect Alexandroupolis with Thessaloniki and Athens (and those with a connection to Alex / Polis), while route time increased as the network was "upgraded". Services to/from Ormenio were replaced by a bus service. In 2014 TrainOSE replaced services to/from Dikaia with buses

In 2014 TrainOSE replaced services to/from Dikaia with buses In 2017 OSE's passenger transport sector was privatised as TrainOSE, currently a wholly owned subsidiary of Ferrovie dello Stato Italiane infrastructure, including stations remained under the control of OSE. In Late January 2020 a fire "accidentally" started when the possessions of a homeless man (who had found shelter within the courtyard of the station) caught fire for "unknown reason". It was reported that just 20 days later the station was repaired. In July 2022, the station began being served by Hellenic Train, the rebranded TrainOSE.

Following the Tempi crash, Hellenic Train announced rail replacement buses on certain routes across the Greek rail network, starting Wednesday 15 March 2023.

In August 2025, the Greek Ministry of Infrastructure and Transport confirmed the creation of a new body, Greek Railways (Greek: Σιδηρόδρομοι Ελλάδος, romanized: Ellinikí Sidiródromi Monoprósopi) to assume responsibility for rail infrastructure, planning, modernisation projects, and rolling stock across Greece. Previously, these functions were divided among several state-owned entities: OSE, which managed infrastructure; ERGOSÉ, responsible for modernisation projects; and GAIAOSÉ, which owned stations, buildings, and rolling stock. OSE had overseen both infrastructure and operations until its vertical separation in 2005. Rail safety has been identified as a key priority. The merger follows the July approval of a Parliamentary Bill to restructure the national railway system, a direct response to the Tempi accident of February 2023, in which 43 people died after a head-on collision.

== Facilities ==
The station has waiting rooms and a staffed booking office within a 1960s-era building (which was renovated in 2020 following a fire). There are toilets, parking and a Taxi rank also available, as well as bike racks. There is a disabled ramp leading up to the island platform, which is shielded by 1960s-era concrete canopies.

== Services ==
The station is served by regional stopping services to Dikaia and Ormenio. InterCity trains also serve it to Thessaloniki.

On 30 December 2019, TrainOSE announced re-opening the Alexandroupolis-Ormenio route. As of 2020, the Thomas Cook European Timetable notes that the station is served by two daily trains to/from Thessaloniki, and by three pairs of regular trains to Dikaia. However As of 2022 it is reported that the timetable was cutback to just two services

There are currently no daytime through trains to/from Athens. International services such as the "Friendship Express" to Istanbul via Pythion remains suspended since 2011. Also, there are currently no regular passenger services to Bulgaria.

Between July 2005 and February 2011 the Friendship Express, (an international InterCity train jointly operated by the Turkish State Railways (TCDD) and TrainOSE linking Istanbul's Sirkeci station, Turkey and Thessaloniki, Greece) made scheduled stops at Central Station of Alexandroupolis.

As of October 2024 all services are run as a rail-replacement bus service, except for the Alexandroupolis to Ormenio route where regular trains continue.

== Station layout ==
	Dim Karaoli
P Platforms	Platform 1	Hellenic Train to Ormenio (Feres) (Terminal & Departure platform) →
P Platforms	Island platform, doors will open on the left
P Platforms	Platform 2	→ Hellenic Train to Ormenio (Feres) (Terminal & Departure platform) →

== Future ==
Alexandroupolis railway station and its port could see an upgrade if the plans for the Sea2Sea project go ahead.

== Gallery ==
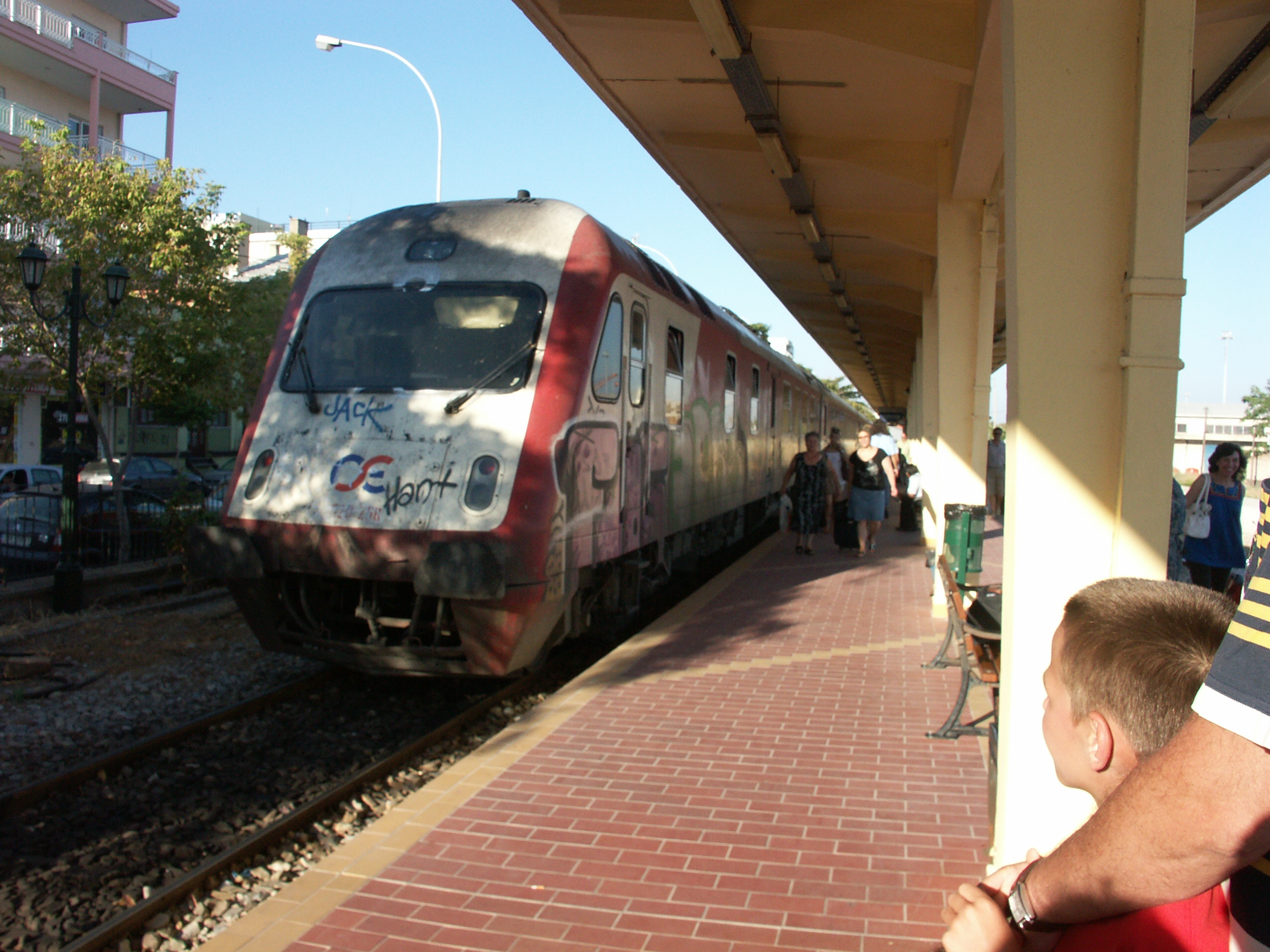
Diesel Multiple Unit DE-IC 2000N as an InterCity train stands at the Alexandroupolis after arriving from Thessaloniki.

== See also ==
- Railway stations in Greece
- Hellenic Railways Organization
- Hellenic Train
