= Ormenio railway station =

Railway station in Greece

Ορμένιο Ormenio
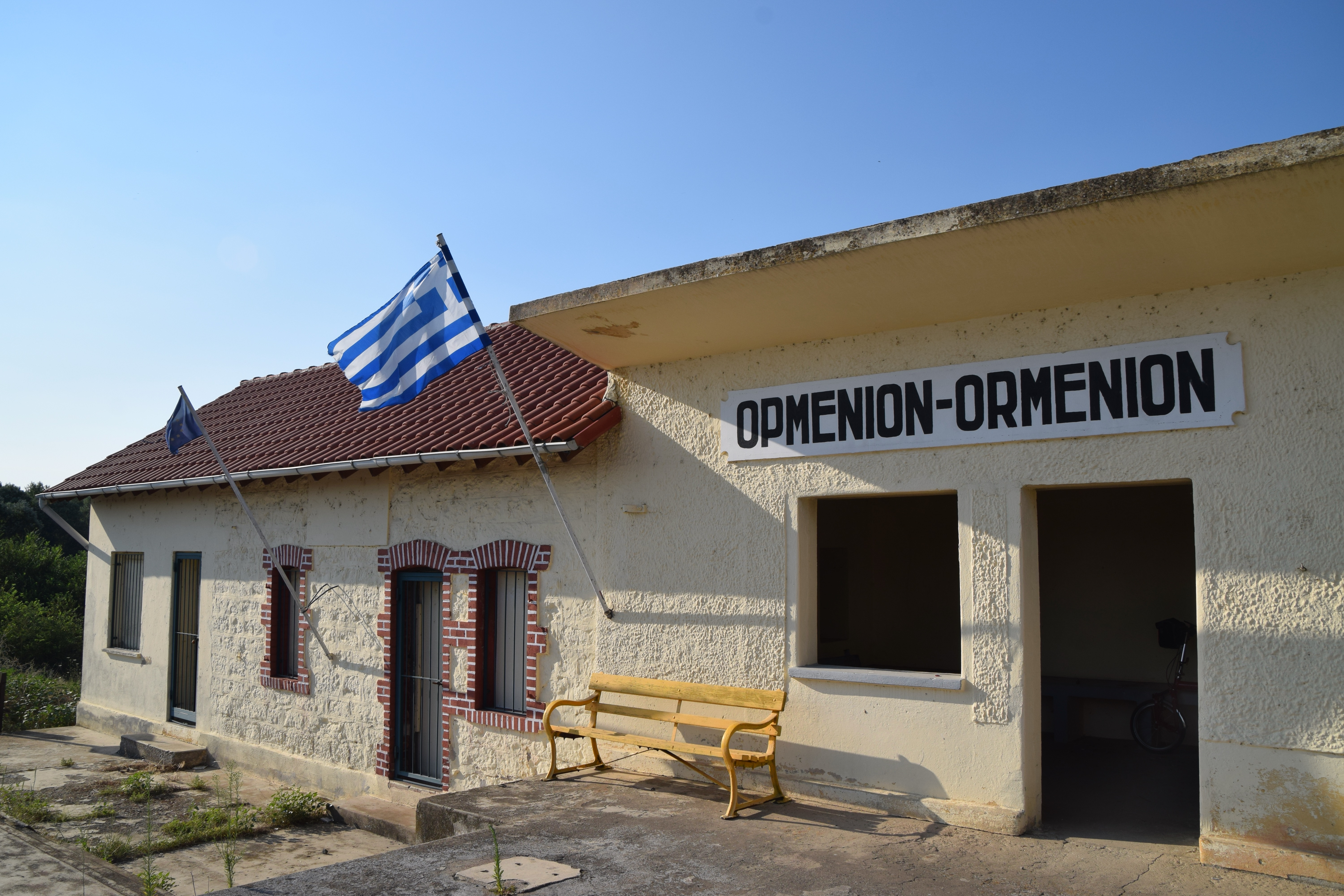

General information
- Location: Ormenio; Evros; Greece
- Coordinates: 41°43′42″N 26°12′45″E
- Owner: GAIAOSE
- Line: Alexandroupolis–Svilengrad railway
- Platforms: 1 (side platform)
- Tracks: 2 (1 disused)
- Train operators: Hellenic Train

Construction
- Structure type: at-grade
- Platform levels: 1
- Parking: No
- Cycle facilities: No

Other information
- Status: Unstaffed
- Website: https://www.ose.gr/en/

History
- Electrified: No

Services
Preceding station	Hellenic Train	Following station
Ptelea towards Alexandroupoli	G6 Alexandroupoli-Ormenio	Terminus
Location
- Location within Greece

Ormenio railway station (Greek: Σιδηροδρομικός Σταθμός Ορμένιου, romanized: Sidirodromikós stathmós Ormeniou) is a railway station that serves the village of Ormenio, Evros in Eastern Macedonia and Thrace, Greece. Located around 900 metres (3,000 ft) north of the centre of Ormenio, the station was opened by the Chemins de fer Orientaux, (now part of OSE). Today Hellenic Train operates just 1 daily Regional train; however, there are waiting rooms available. Ormenio is the northernmost railway station in Greece and the final stop before crossing the border into Bulgaria.

== History ==
The station lies on the line built by the Chemins de fer Orientaux (CO), from Istanbul to Vienna.

The railway was a vital link during World War I as the Ottoman Empire, Bulgaria, and Austria-Hungary were all Central Allies. Following the defeat of the Ottoman Empire, its remaining imperial possessions were divided. The sections from Alexandroupoli to Svilengrad, except for a short section of about 10 kilometres (6.2 mi) in Turkey serving Edirne Karaagaç station and for 3 kilometres (1.9 mi) between the Greek border and Svilengrad station in Bulgaria come under the control of the French-Hellenic Railway Company (CFFH), a subsidiary of the CO, when the CFFH was incorporated in July 1929.

Under the Treaty of Lausanne of 1923, a new border between Greece and Turkey was established at the Evros river, which had the result in the railway from Istanbul to Bulgaria entering Greece at Pythio, then re-entered Turkey at Edirne (Karaağaç railway station), re-entered Greece at Marasia, and finally entered Bulgaria between Ormenio and Svilengrad. This arrangement continued until 1971 when two new lines were opened. In Turkey, the Edirne Cut-off was opened to allow trains from Istanbul to Bulgaria to run through Edirne entirely on Turkish territory so that trains such as the Orient Express no longer passed through Ormenio. In Greece, a line was opened to allow trains from Pythio to Bulgaria to stay on Greek territory and avoid Edirne. In 1954 the CFFH was absorbed by the Hellenic State Railways. In 1971, the Hellenic State Railways was reorganised into the OSE taking over responsibilities for most of Greece's rail infrastructure.

In the 1990s, OSE introduced the InterCity service to the Alexandroupoli–Svilengrad line Which reduced travel times across the whole line.

In 2020 it was announced that a section of the line between Pythio and Ormenio was to be upgraded at the cost of €1.4 million as part of an ambitious integrated intergovernmental transport plan which will see this, and 39 other transport sector projects be built, with financing from the European Commission with a total of €117 million. The package of measures aims to build or improve transport connections and connectivity across Europe, with a focus on sustainable transport. The project for the Pythian-Ormenio section envisions upgrading the existing line infrastructure and trackbed, doubling of the track as well as the installation of electrification signalling (ETCS Level 1) along the entire stretch, with the aim of improving freight transport with Bulgaria and Turkey.

Following the Tempi crash, Hellenic Train announced rail replacement bus's on certain routes across the Greek rail network, starting Wednesday 15 March 2023.

In August 2025, the Greek Ministry of Infrastructure and Transport confirmed the creation of a new body, Greek Railways (Greek: Σιδηρόδρομοι Ελλάδος, romanized: Ellinikí Sidiródromi Monoprósopi) to assume responsibility for rail infrastructure, planning, modernisation projects, and rolling stock across Greece. Previously, these functions were divided among several state-owned entities: OSE, which managed infrastructure; ERGOSÉ, responsible for modernisation projects; and GAIAOSÉ, which owned stations, buildings, and rolling stock. OSE had overseen both infrastructure and operations until its vertical separation in 2005. Rail safety has been identified as a key priority. The merger follows the July approval of a Parliamentary Bill to restructure the national railway system, a direct response to the Tempi accident of February 2023, in which 43 people died after a head-on collision.

== Facilities ==
The station buildings have recently been repaired and upgraded; however, the waiting rooms are barely more than brick shelters. The platforms have no outside seating, Dot-matrix display departure and arrival screens or timetable poster boards for passenger information, and the station remains little more than an unstaffed halt.

== Services ==
As of 2020, the station is only served by one daily pair of regional trains Alexandroupoli–Ormenio. There are currently no services to Svilengrad.

As of October 2024 all services are run as a rail-replacement bus service.

== Station layout ==
L Ground/Concourse		Exits
Level; L1	Side platform, doors will open on the right
Level; L1	Platform 1	towards Alexandroupoli (Ptelea) →
Level; L1	Platform 2	towards Alexandroupoli (Ptelea) →
Level; L1	Side platform, Disused

== Migration Crisis ==
In September 2019, 26 Afghan and Pakistani men were found at the station, dressed only in underwear. They had been robbed and left close to the Bulgarian border. It was later reported that the men were left in Greece by Bulgarian smugglers after they first stole everything they had on them. Locals provided food and clothing to men, some no older than 16. The 26 were eventually transferred to the Orestiada Border Guard Department, which is in the process of drafting the case file and is then expected to be transferred to the PRT for recording and identification. Both the local authorities and Frontex are investigating the incident.
