= Svilengrad railway station =

Railway station in Svilengrad, Bulgaria

Svilengrad Свиленград
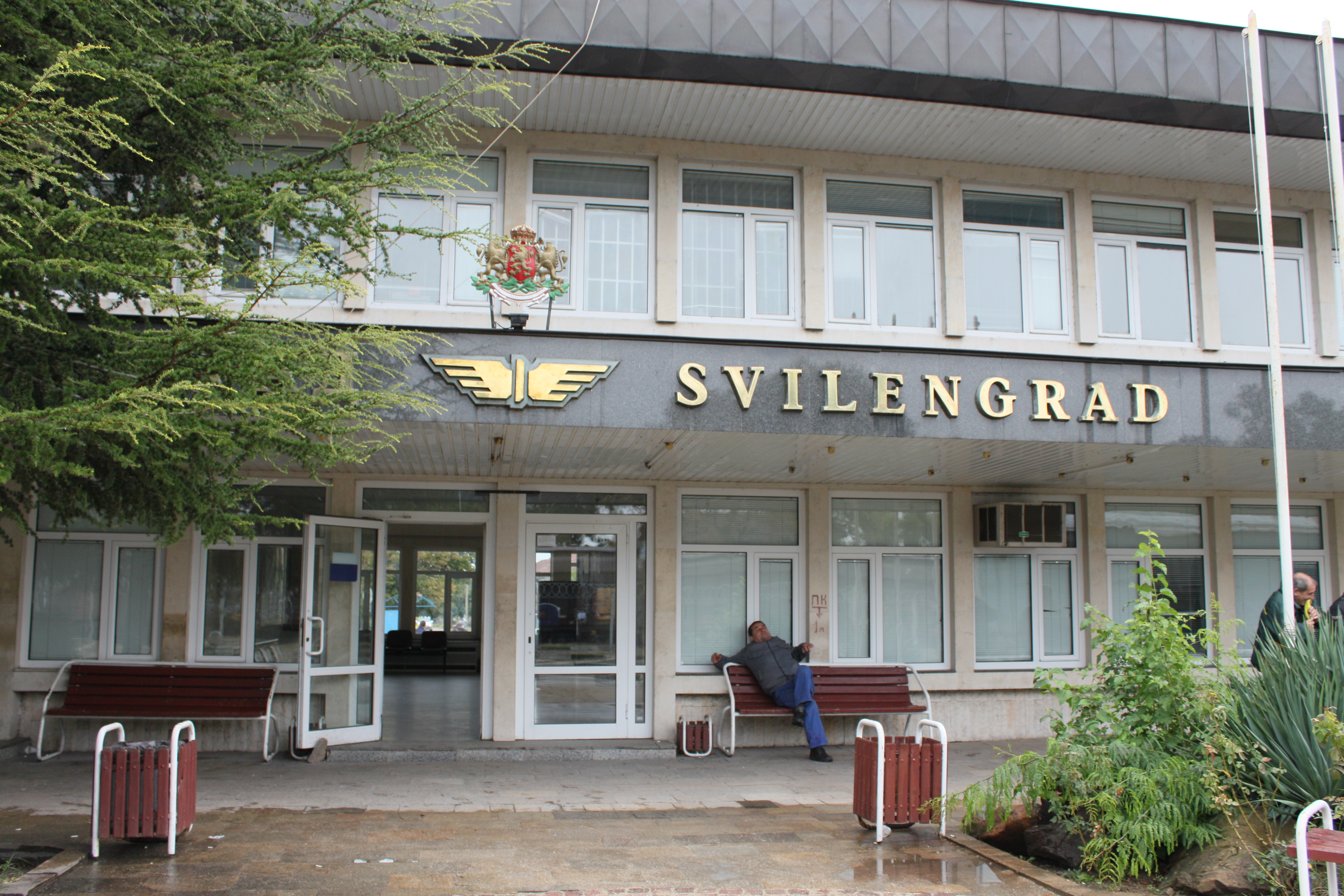
- The front entrance of the station building.

General information
- Location: Kap. Petko Voyvoda 6500; Svilengrad; Bulgaria
- Coordinates: 41.4624°N 26.0839°E
- Owner: Bulgarian State Railways
- Lines: Alexandroupolis–Svilengrad; Pehlivanköy–Svilengrad; Kalotina–Svilengrad
- Platforms: 3 (2 island platforms, 1 side platform)
- Tracks: 3

Construction
- Structure type: At-grade

History
- Opened: 1874
- Rebuilt: 1971
- Electrified: 25 kV AC, 50 Hz

Services
Preceding station	BDŽ	Following station
Lyubimec towards Sofia	Istanbul-Sofia Express	Kapıkule towards Istanbul
Lyubimec towards Bucharest	Bosphorus Express	Kapıkule towards Istanbul
Lyubimec towards Sofia	BDŽ Rapid	Terminus
Lyubimec towards Plovdiv	BDŽ Passenger	Terminus
Location

The Svilengrad railway station is the last station before the Bulgaria/Turkey and Bulgaria/Greece border. The station was built in 1874 by the Chemins de fer Orientaux as part of the Istanbul–Vienna railway. Regional trains to Dimitrovgrad as well as the Bosphorus Express to Bucharest and the Balkans Express to Belgrade via Sofia, both from Istanbul service the station.

== Services ==
Between 1991 and March 2013, the Balkan Express, (an international overnight InterCity sleeper train jointly operated by the Turkish State Railways (TCDD), Bulgarian State Railways (BDŽ), Serbian Railways (ŽS) and Hungarian State Railways (MÁV) linking Istanbul's Sirkeci station, Turkey and Budapest Keleti station, via Sofia, Bulgaria and Belgrade, Serbia, made scheduled stops at Svilengrad.
