= Karaağaç railway station =

Railway station in Edirne, Turkey

KARAAĞAÇ
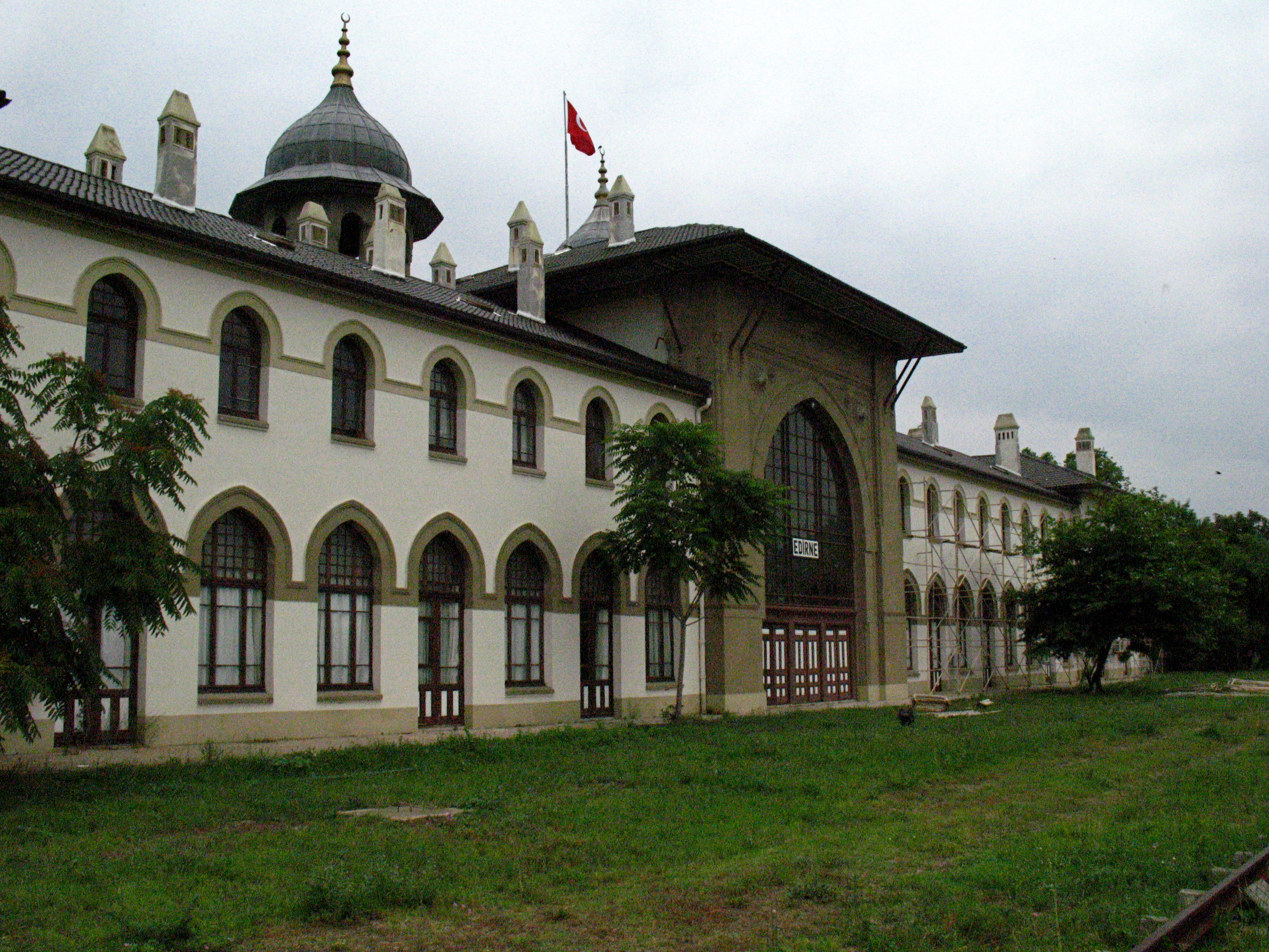
- The front facade of the railway station after redevelopment.

General information
- Location: Karaağaç Cd. 49, Karaağaç Mah., Edirne, Turkey 22100
- Coordinates: 41.6517°N 26.5219°E
- System: Former Turkish State Railways station
- Owner: Trakya University

Construction
- Structure type: At-grade
- Architect: Ahmet Kemaleddin
- Architectural style: Turkish Neoclassical

History
- Opened: 4 April 1873
- Closed: 4 October 1971
- Rebuilt: 1914
- Former names: Edirne
Location

The Karaağaç station (Turkish: Karaağaç Garı) or before 1971 Edirne station (Turkish: Edirne Garı) was the name of the former railway station in Edirne, located 4 km (2.5 mi) south-west of the city. Currently, it houses Trakya University's Faculty of Fine Arts.

== History ==
In 1868, the Compagnie des Chemins de Fer Orientaux (CO), Orient Railway Company, received a concession to build a railway to Vienna, Austria via Edirne. In 1871, the line reached Edirne but in order to avoid building a bridge across the Maritsa River, the station was built in Karaağaç in 1873. Edirne was a former capital in the Ottoman Empire, noted for grand architecture, and in 1914 the larger station was built that stands today, designed by Ahmet Kemaleddin in the Turkish Neoclassical style, similar to Sirkeci railway station in Istanbul. After the Turkish Independence War, and the signing of the Treaty of Lausanne, the Turkish-Greek border was on the Maritsa River except the Karaağaç section that remained in Turkish territory.

The line was used by the Greek State Railways (OSE) until 1971 when the Turkish State Railways (TCDD) built a line from Pehlivanköy through the city of Edirne to the Bulgarian border, and OSE built a short cut-off between Marasia and Nea Vyssa to avoid Turkish territory near Edirne. This resulted in the abandonment of the station in 1971.

== Today ==
Following redevelopment works, the railway station building was converted into Faculty of Fine Arts of Trakya University in Edirne. Opened in 1998, the Treaty of Lausanne Monument and Museum are located next to the former railway station.
