= Marasia =

Marasia Μαράσια
- Community
- Location within Greece
- Coordinates: 41°40′N 26°28′E
- Country: Greece
- Administrative region: East Macedonia and Thrace
- Regional unit: Evros
- Municipality: Orestiada
- Municipal unit: Trigono

Population (2021)
  - Community: 80
- Time zone: UTC+2 (EET)
  - Summer (DST): UTC+3 (EEST)

Marasia (Greek: Μαράσια, Turkish: Maraş, Bulgarian:Maраш) is a village in the northern part of the Evros regional unit in Greece. Marasia is part of the municipal unit of Trigono. It is situated between the rivers Evros and Ardas, close to their confluence. The Evros forms the border with Turkey here, and the Turkish city Edirne is 7 km to its east. Marasia is bypassed by the Greek National Road 51/E85 (Alexandroupoli - Orestiada - Ormenio - Svilengrad).

== History ==
An Early Iron Age settlement with hand-glazed pottery with ribbed and incised decoration has been identified at the Phylakes site on the low-lying slope. During the Turkish occupation, it was a mixed village with Christian and Muslim residents.

The village is first mentioned by name in 1400 and recorded in a document of 1528 as a waqf of Sultan Murat II and later as a suburb of Adrianople. Its name comes from the Turkish word Maraş meaning suburb and the Turkish name of the village was Maraşköy (ie the village suburb). As a settlement it was officially mentioned in 1924 in Official Gazette 194A-14/08/1924 to be annexed to the then community of Kastaneon. According to the "Kallikratis" Program, it is the local community of Marasia that belongs to the municipal unit of Trigonos of the municipality of Orestiada and according to the 2011 census it had a population of 140 inhabitants.

After the Greek-Turkish population exchange of 1923, refugees settled mainly from Adrianople, but also from the rest of Eastern Thrace. It is the birthplace of the Maraslis family and of the merchant Grigorios Maraslis (1780-1851), one of the first settlers of Odessa citation pending.

The village became famous when in 2007 the Academy of Athens awarded the "Lady of Marasians" (Vasiliki Lampidou - Fotaki), who died on 21 June 2011, at the age of 107 and was buried with the honours of an active officer of the Armed Forces.

== Population ==
Year	Population
1981	357
1991	323
2001	198
2011	140
2021	80

== Transport ==
=== Rail ===
The community is served by Marasia railway station, one of the most northerly railway stations in Greece on the Alexandroupolis–Svilengrad line. There is currently no rail connection to Svilengrad via Marasia.

== See also ==
- List of settlements in the Evros regional unit
