= Chemins de fer Orientaux =

Ottoman railway company

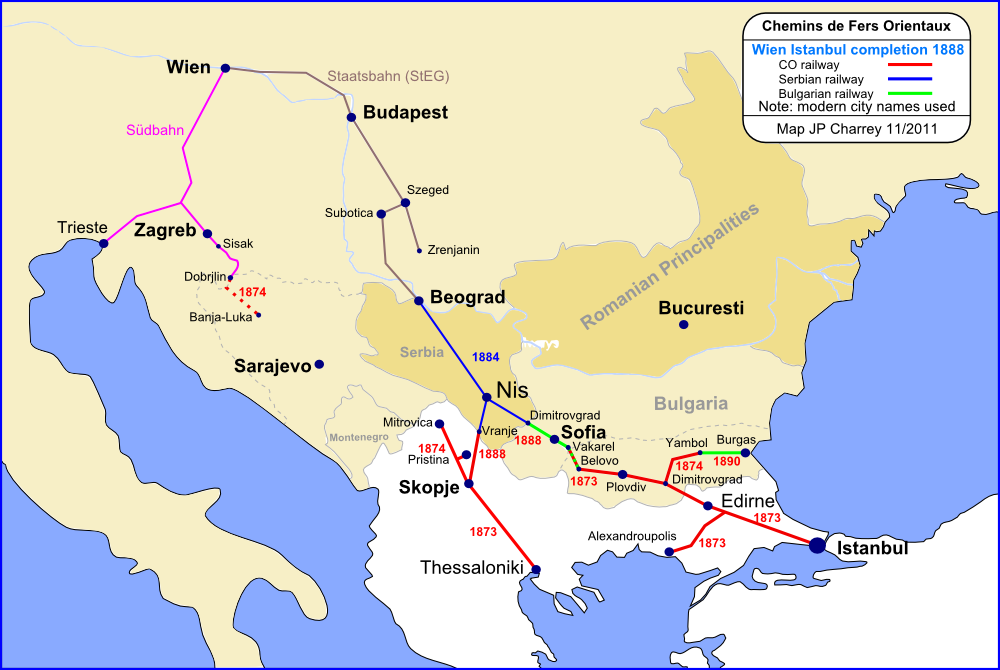
- CO system in 1888

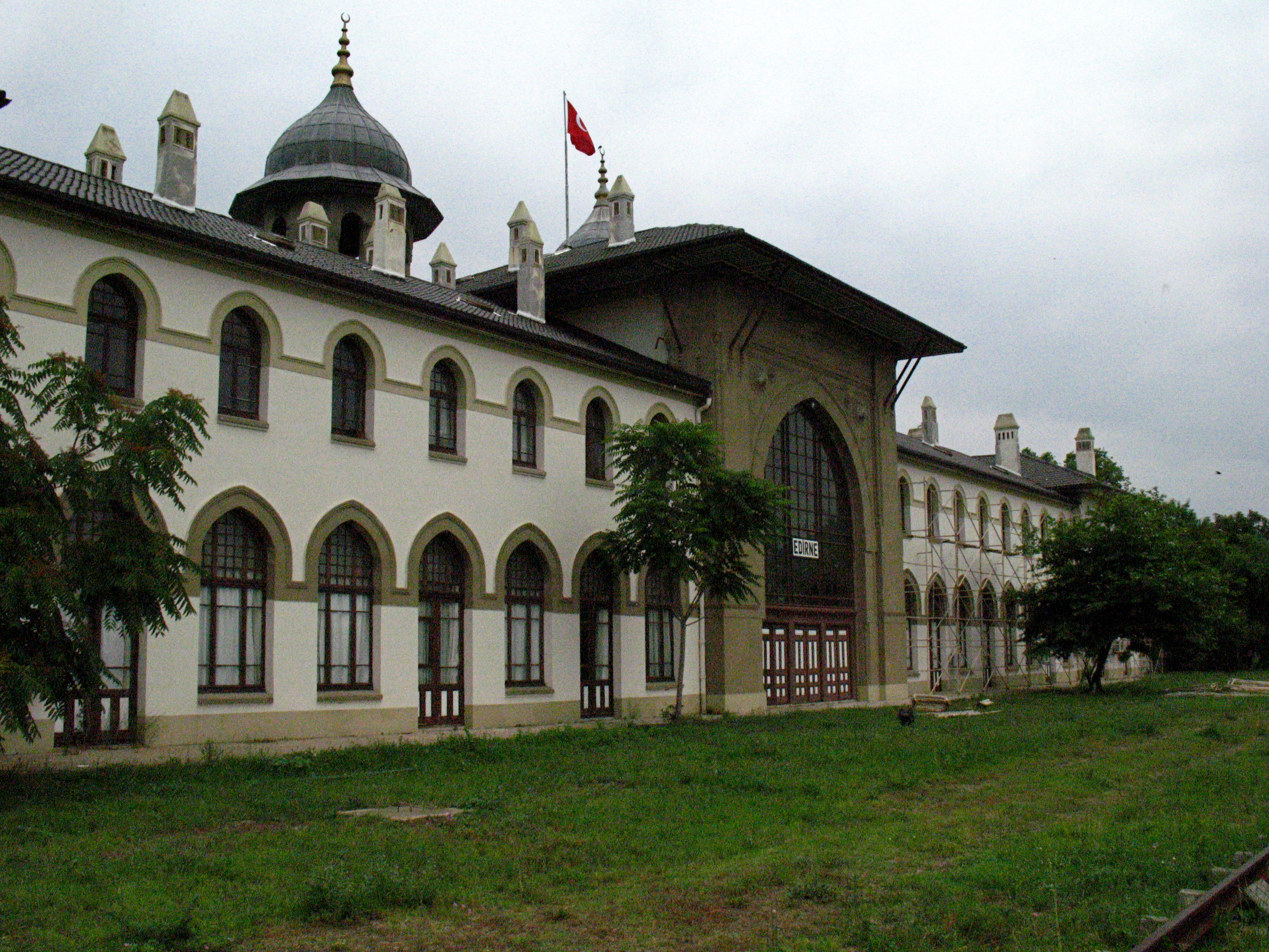
- Karaağaç railway station, built in 1873 by the CO, but no longer used.

Overview
- Headquarters: Paris (1869–1878); Vienna (1878–1912); Istanbul (1912–1937)
- Reporting mark: CO
- Locale: European Turkey, southern Bulgaria, northern Greece, Serbia, Bosnia and Herzegovina, Kosovo
- Dates of operation: 1870–1937
- Successor: TCDD, SDŽ, BDZ, SEK, ÖS, CFFH

Technical
- Track gauge: 1,435 mm (4 ft 8 1/2 in)

The Chemins de fer Orientaux (English: Oriental Railway; Turkish: Rumeli Demiryolu or İstanbul-Viyana Demiryolu) (reporting mark: CO) was an Ottoman railway company operating in Rumelia (the European part of the Ottoman Empire, corresponding to the Balkan peninsula) and later European Turkey, from 1870 to 1937. The CO was one of the five pioneer railways in the Ottoman Empire and built the main trunk line in the Balkans. Between 1889 and 1937, the railway hosted the world-famous Orient Express.

The railway was charted in 1870 to build a line from Istanbul to Vienna. Because of many political problems in the Balkans, construction started and stopped and ownership changed or split often. Not until 1888 did the CO complete its objective, but after the First Balkan War in 1912, the railway was limited to only Eastern Thrace. The CO continued operations as a regional railway until 1937, when the Turkish State Railways absorbed it.

== Headquarters ==
The company headquarters was in Paris (1869–1878), then Vienna (1878–1912) and finally in Istanbul] (1912–1937). The reporting mark was CO.

== History ==
=== Background ===
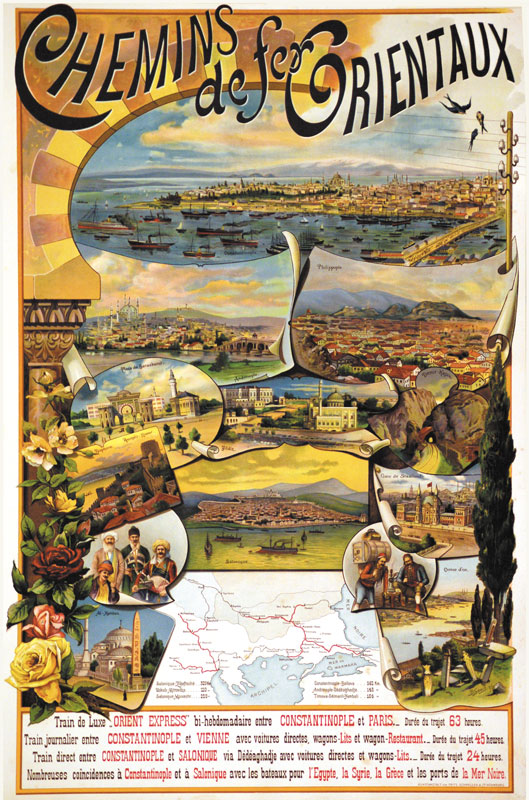
Poster from 1898

By the second half of the 19th century, the once powerful and dominant Ottoman Empire was declining greatly. The empire's territory in Europe extended from Constantinople to the Danube River and the Carpathian Mountains. However, due to the rise of nationalism in the Balkans, mostly provoked by Russia, the Ottoman Empire was slowly losing its control over the area. The Crimean War had just ended and gave the aging Empire a slight break against Russian influence over the Balkans. The Sultanate in Istanbul looked to strengthen its sovereignty in the region and help its declining economy during the short peace. Trade by sea was dominated by the British naval monopoly, so the Sublime Porte had to look at other ways of transport. Railways showed their effectiveness in western Europe and the Ottomans sought to bring this technology into the empire. The Sultanate looked to build a railway from Constantinople to Vienna. A trunk line such as that would allow easier deployments of troops in the European part of the Empire and would open up many new trade opportunities with western Europe. However, the railway would also bring Austrian influence into the Balkans.

The decision for a railway was finalized and Abdülaziz awarded a concession to Van der Elst and Cie, a Belgian construction company, on 31 May 1868, with the help of André Langrand-Dumonceau. Langrand-Dumonceau quickly took over the concession from Van der Elst and started the works himself. However. he ran into financial difficulties and could not continue construction of the line, so the Sultanate cancelled the concession on 12 April 1869. The concession was then given to Maurice de Hirsch, a German financier, to build the line. Hirsch had partnered with Dumonceau in the past on several railway works. The charter included a main line from Constantinople to the Austrian border at Dobrljin via Edirne, which would connect to the Austrian Southern Railway. This route was chosen over a more direct route through Belgrade in order to avoid building the line through Serbia, which was semi-independent. Austro-Hungary also was in favor of this route to increase their influence over Bosnia. This charter also included the construction of branch lines to Burgaz, Selanik and Dedeağaç. Hirsch then founded the Imperial Turkish European Railway, headquartered in Paris, to build the line in 1869. The company hired Wilhelm von Pressel, from the Austrian Southern Railway, to be the chief engineer of the project. In January 1870, construction started simultaneously in Constantinople, Dedeağaç, Selanik and Dobrljin. Operation of the line was to be given to the Austrian Southern Railway; but since negotiations failed, Hirsch founded the Oriental Railway (Chemins de fer Orientaux), also headquartered in Paris, to operate the line.

=== Construction ===
Construction of the line was well underway by 1871. Following a government change the same year, the new Grand Vizier Mahmud Nedim Pasha started to renegotiate the concession to reduce the budget of constructing the line because of the Empire's growing financial problems. The new concession no longer had completion to Vienna as a priority and was signed on 18 May 1872. Under the new agreement, Hirsch would continue to manage ongoing construction, but the Ottoman government would supervise in building new lines. The CO had completed over 1,300 km (810 mi) of railway, consisting of three main lines by 1874. These lines were not yet connected with each other, but the CO had started service on them. The longest and most important of these lines were Constantinople to Belovo via Edirne and Filibe, with branches to Dedeağaç and Yambol. The other two were from Thessaloniki to Mitrovica and Dobrljin to Banja Luka. The Dobrljin-Banja Luka line wasn't connected with the Austrian network yet so revenue on the line was low. The line later became a liability for the CO and was abandoned in 1876, until it was connected to the Austrian network.

Further construction slowed down during the Ottoman financial crisis of 1875, where most of the Empire faced a large famine. This led to several uprisings in the Balkans, the most notable being the April Uprising, which triggered a large war in the region, which halted all railway works. Many of the workers were drafted and fought against a large coalition army led by the Russian Empire. The Constantinople–Filibe line played an important role in transporting goods and soldiers to the frontier. However, the Ottoman army was heavily outnumbered as the Russian/Romanian/Bulgarian armies pushed from the north. The coalition forces captured much of the main line west of Edirne by the end of 1877 and once Filibe was captured, along with its large railway depot, in January 1878, the Ottomans looked for peace. The Congress of Berlin restored peace to the Balkans as the Ottoman Empire granted full independence to Romania, Serbia and Montenegro while Bosnia and Herzegovina would be occupied by Austria-Hungary and Bulgaria would become a self-governing vassal state of the Empire under Russian influence.

The future of the CO was also decided in the Congress of Berlin. According to a certain Viennese rumor which came about at a later date, Hirsch's fortune after the Treaty of San Stefano had been supposedly lost. It was only due to his connection to the Prince of Wales, and through him, the British representatives at the Congress of Berlin, that the final peace treaty was resolved in Hirsch's favor. Due to the railway falling into multiple countries, the congress had the CO put under a special committee with delegates from Austria-Hungary, Serbia, Bulgaria and the Ottoman Empire to oversee the railway. This committee was dubbed the Quadruple Committee by Berlin. Hirsch then moved the headquarters of the CO from Paris to Vienna in 1878. The newly established Kingdom of Serbia, under Austrian influence, looked to build a railway in its territory regardless to the Constantinople–Vienna railway. In 1881, King Milan awarded a concession to Paul Eugène Bontoux, a French entrepreneur, to construct a railway from Belgrade to Vranje via Nis. However his Catholic company General Union went bankrupt in April 1881. The concession was then split between German and French banks, which formed the Serbian National Railways. The Quadruple Committee finally met, after much delay, in Vienna in December 1882. After much negotiation, the committee signed an agreement on 9 May 1883. This new agreement changed the main line from its former southern route to a direct route through Serbia, something the Ottomans wished to avoid since the 1860s. This new route would continue from Belovo to Sofia and connect to the Serbian National Railways (SDZ) at Nis and a branch line would be built to connect Skopje to Nis. Once complete, the SDZ would have full ownership of the railway between Nis and Belgrade but operation of the line would be done by the CO via trackage rights. With all disputes settled, construction could finally continue. The SDZ completed the Belgrade–Nis railway on 15 September 1884, which was under construction since 1881. The SDZ also connected to the Austrian railways north of Belgrade the same year. The CO continued construction west of Belovo but construction was halted again, when Bulgaria violated the Berlin Congress and moved in to occupy Eastern Rumelia in 1885. This forced a new agreement where Bulgaria would own and operate tracks within its territory, while the CO would be permitted trackage rights. Meanwhile, the SDZ extended the railway from Nis to Leskovac on March 18 and to Vranje on 13 September 1886. The CO completed the southern part of the Nis–Skopje line, connecting to the SDZ at Vranje on 25 May 1888. With this, Selanik was connected to the rest of the system. The newly formed Bulgarian State Railways (BDZ) completed the Belovo–Sofia line on 1 August and connected it to the SDZ at Dragoman on 8 August 1888.

=== Opening and operation ===
The full Constantinople–Vienna main line was opened on 12 August 1888. The CO, along with the Hungarian State Railways and the Bulgarian State Railways - BDZ, inaugurated the first train from Istanbul to Vienna. One of the most famous trains in history, the Orient Express, started her first run from Paris to Istanbul on 1 June 1889. This train was operated by CIWL, an international hotel and logistics company. A railway terminus on the European side of Istanbul, Sirkeci railway station, which was under construction since February 1888, was opened on 3 November 1890.

=== Locomotives ===
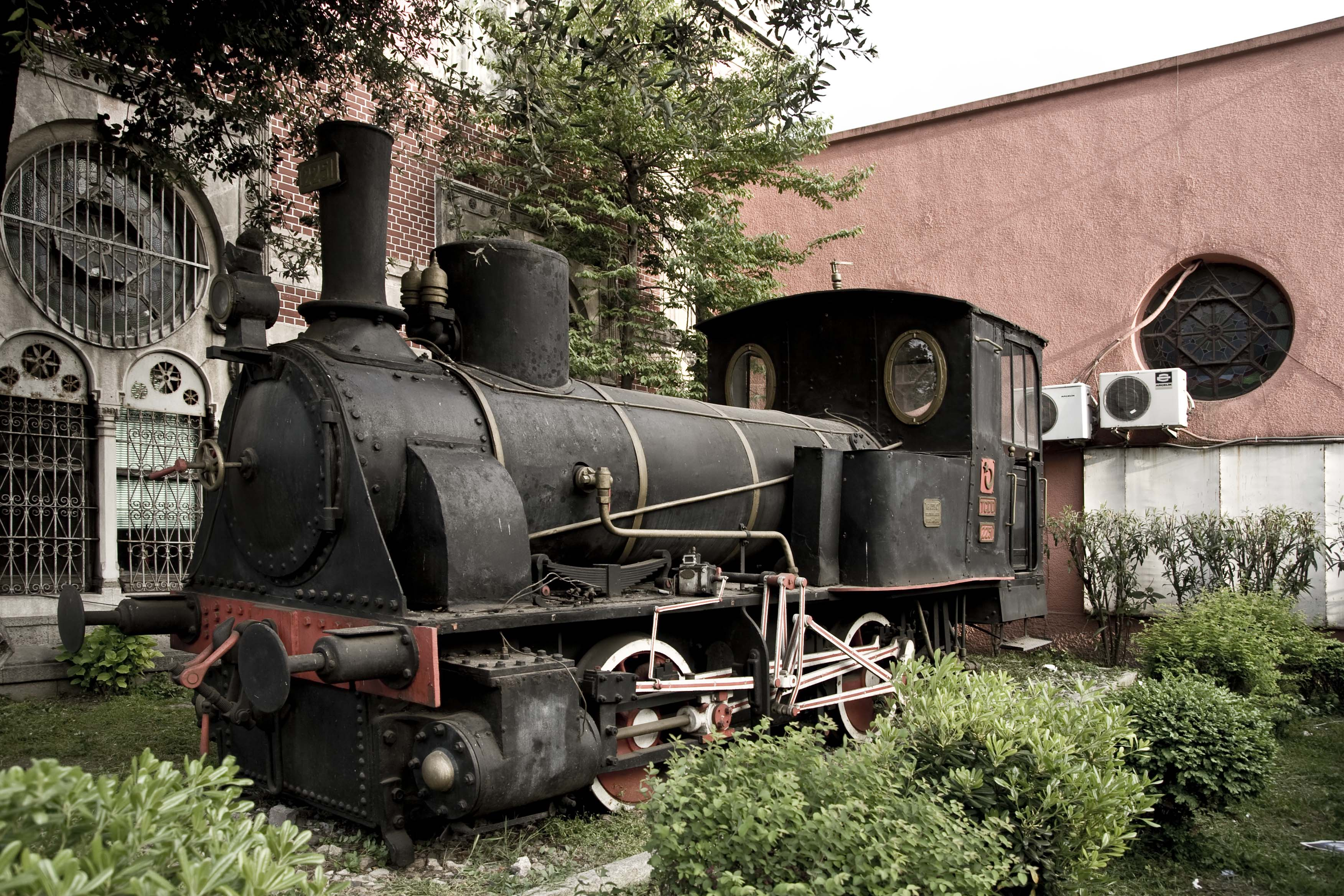
Locomotive 407 from the CO

The Oriental Railway only had steam locomotives. Its main suppliers were Austrian, German, French and Belgian manufacturers.

Locomotives with tenders were numbered 0 to 300, tank locomotives with tender were numbered 301 to 500. Locomotives transferred from the Thessaloniki - Monastir received separate numbers in the 500 to 600 range. The reason is no longer known. The 3 Mallet locomotives were numbered 601 to 603.

Oriental Railway locomotives were taken over by the various national railways that also overtook the network. Some locomotives went to the CFFH before going to either SEK or TCDD.

Several locomotives of the Oriental Railway have been preserved. The former Locomotive 407 built in 1874 and taken over by the TCDD under the number 2251 in 1937, stands as a memorial locomotive in front of Istanbul-Sirkeci station. Until 1965 it was still used by the TCDD, most recently in Adana, she was thus over 90 years in use. A 1912 locomotive supplied by Maffei with the CO number 338 is now in the Çamlık Railway Museum with TCDD 3558 number. Another locomotive of this series is monument locomotive at Amasya station. The TCDD 33508 is a monument locomotive in Sivas.

| Class | Number | Manufacturer | Qty | Year | Type | Comments | Picture |
|---|---|---|---|---|---|---|---|
| – | 1–10 | Sigl | 10 | 1871 | C | | |
| – | 11–54 | Hanomag | 44 | 1872–75 | C | 8 went to TCDD, 23 went to SEK | |
| VIII | 55–57 | Sigl | 3 | 1897 | 2'C | Became TCDD 35501–503 | |
| IX | 58–60 | Maffei | 3 | 1908 | 2'C | Type Bavarian P 3/5 N, became TCDD 35504–506 | |
| XIV | 71–74 | Hanomag | 4 | 1912–14 | 1'C1' | Went to CFFH in 1929 then to SEK class Ζε in 1955 | |
| – | 101–116 | StEG, Krauss | 16 (14 from StEG, 2 from Krauss) | 1888–1894 | 2'B | Silmilar to kkStB 4, 5 went to SEK, class Gß, 7 went to CFFH in 1929 | |
| – | 201–209 | Henschel | 9 | 1910–13 | D | Similar to Prussian G 8, became TCDD 44501–509 | |
| – | 241–262 | Batignolles, Schneider | 22 | 1924–1927 | 1'D | 18 became TCDD 45501–518, 4 went to CFFH in 1929 and then to SEK in 1955 | |
| – | 243–246 | StEG | 4 | 1878 | D | Taken over from Ruse–Varna railway, identical to StEG I 600–711, went to BDŽ in 1988 | |
| – | 279–290 | Beyer, Peacock & Company; Sharp, Stewart & Company | 12 | 1862–1868 | C | Taken over from Ruse–Varna railway, went to BDŽ in 1988 | |
| – | 291–300 | Hanomag | 10 | 1871–75 | C | Identical to 11–54, separate numbering likely to be connected to Ruse–Varna railway origin | |
| – | 301–305 | Schneider, Grafenstaden | 10 | 1869–70 | Ct | | |
| – | 311–319 | Couillet | 9 | 1865 | C1't | Taken over from Ruse–Varna railway | |
| – | 321–328 | Krauss | 8 | 1875 | 1'Bt | | |
| – | 331–340 | Maffei | 10 | 1911–12 | 1'C1't | Became TCDD 3551–60 | |
| – | 401–404 | Tubize | 4 | 1872 | Bt | | |
| – | 405–408 | Krauss | 4 | 1874 | Bt | Nr. 407 became TCDD 2251 | |
| – | 411–412 | Tubize | 2 | 1875 | Bt | | |
| – | 501–509 | Maschinenfabrik Esslingen | 9 | 1892–94 | C | From the Thessaloniki – Monastir railway, 4 units went to SEK. | |
| – | 510–511 | Maffei | 2 | 1908 | 1'C | Similar to Prussian G 5.1, From the Thessaloniki – Monastir railway, became SEK class Εβ | |
| – | 521–523 | Borsig | 3 | 1912 | 1'C | Similar to JDŽ class 20, From the Thessaloniki – Monastir railway, became SEK class Εγ | |
| – | 601–603 | MÁVAG | 3 | 1918 | (1'C)C | Mallet type locomotive. Identical to MÁV Class 601 | |

== See also ==
- Istanbul–Pythio railway
