= Alpullu railway station =

Railway station in Turkey

Alpullu
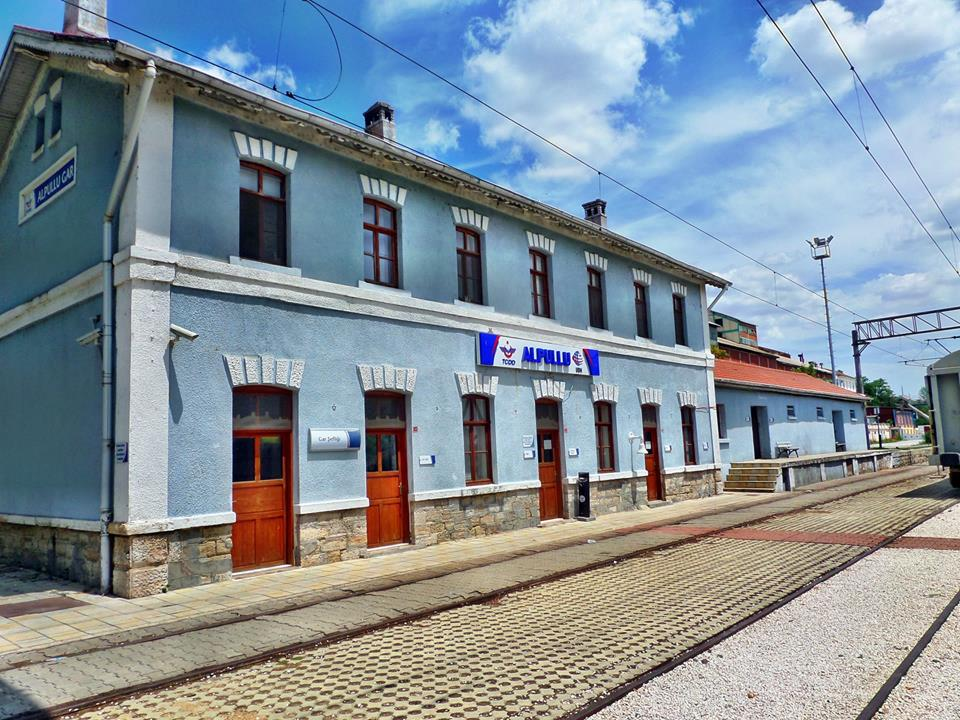
- Alpullu station house in 2016.

General information
- Location: D.555 3, Alpullu 39570; Babaeski/Kırklareli; Turkey
- Coordinates: 41.366337°N 27.142845°E
- System: TCDD intercity and regional rail station
- Owner: Turkish State Railways
- Operator: TCDD Taşımacılık
- Line: Istanbul–Pythio railway
- Platforms: 2 (1 side platform, 1 island platform)
- Tracks: 3

Construction
- Structure type: At-grade
- Parking: Located in front of station building.

History
- Opened: 1926

Services
Preceding station	TCDD Taşımacılık	Following station
Edirne towards Bucharest	Bosphorus Express	Çerkezköy towards Istanbul
Edirne towards Sofia	Istanbul–Sofia Express	Çerkezköy towards Istanbul
Pehlivanköy towards Uzunköprü	Istanbul–Uzunköprü	Lüleburgaz towards Istanbul
Former services
Preceding station	Turkish State Railways	Following station
Pehlivanköy towards Belgrade	Balkan Express	Çerkezköy towards Istanbul
Pehlivanköy towards Thessaloniki	Friendship Express	Halkalı towards Istanbul
Location

Alpullu station is a station in Alpullu, Turkey.

== History ==
The station was opened in 1926, by the Oriental Railway.

== Services ==
TCDD Taşımacılık operates two daily trains, both from Istanbul, that stop at Alpullu, one international intercity train, to Bucharest or Sofia, and one regional train to Kapıkule.

Between 1991 and March 2013 the Balkan Express, (an international overnight InterCity sleeper train jointly operated by the Turkish State Railways (TCDD), Bulgarian State Railways (BDŽ), Serbian Railways (ŽS) and Hungarian State Railways (MÁV) linking Istanbul's Sirkeci station, Turkey and Budapest Keleti station, via Sofia, Bulgaria and Belgrade, Serbia, made scheduled stops at Alpullu.

Between July 2005 and February 2011 the Balkan Express, (an international InterCity train jointly operated by the Turkish State Railways (TCDD) and TrainOSE linking Istanbul's Sirkeci station, Turkey and Thessaloniki, Greece) made scheduled stops at Alpullu.
