= Edirne railway station =

Railway station

Edirne
- The new railway station building, opened in 2026.

General information
- Location: İnci Sk. 2, İstasyon Mah. 22100, Edirne Merkez/Edirne; Turkey
- Coordinates: 41.6554°N 26.5802°E
- System: TCDD intercity and regional rail station
- Owner: Turkish State Railways
- Operator: TCDD Taşımacılık
- Lines: Istanbul–Kapıkule railway Pehlivanköy–Svilengrad railway
- Platforms: 2
- Tracks: 3

Construction
- Structure type: At-Grade
- Parking: Yes
- Accessible: Yes

History
- Opened: August 1971
- Electrified: 25 kV AC, 60 Hz

Services
Preceding station	TCDD Taşımacılık	Following station
Kapıkule towards Sofia	Istanbul–Sofia Express	Alpullu towards Istanbul
Kapıkule towards Bucharest	Bosphorus Express	Alpullu towards Istanbul
Terminus	Yüksek Hızlı Tren	Babaeski YHT towards Çerkezköy
Preceding station	Optima Tours	Following station
Kapıkule towards Villach Hbf	Optima Express (de)	Terminus
Former services
Preceding station	Turkish State Railways	Following station
Kapıkule towards Belgrade	Balkan Express	Pehlivanköy towards Istanbul
Edirne Şehir towards Kapıkule	Istanbul–Kapıkule	Şerbettar towards Istanbul
Location

Edirne railway station (Turkish: Edirne garı) is the main railway station in Edirne, Turkey. Located in the southeastern part of the city, TCDD Taşımacılık operates two international intercity trains, both from Istanbul, to Sofia, Bulgaria and Bucharest, Romania which stop at the station. Along with these two trains, TCDD Taşımacılık also operates a daily regional train from Kapıkule to Istanbul.

Edirne station was built in 1971 as a replacement to the 1873 station, built by the Oriental Railway.

== History ==
The original railway station in Edirne was built in 1873 by the Oriental Railway (CO) as part of a railway from Istanbul to Vienna. When the Treaty of Lausanne was signed in 1923, after Turkish War of Independence, the border between Turkey and Greece was placed along the Maritsa river, except for a small portion of land west of Edirne which remained Turkish. This proved problematic for trains heading to Europe via Bulgaria from Turkey and Greece, since trains need to enter Turkey, from Greece, and then exit back into Greece 7 kilometres (4.3 mi) further in order to continue northwest into Bulgaria.

In the late 1960s, the Turkish State Railways (TCDD) decided to build an 86.5 km (53.7 mi) long bypass connecting to Bulgaria directly. Part of this new railway line was a new railway station in Edirne. This new station was built in a more central location with a larger station building, built in the Postmodern style. The new station, along with the railway, was opened in August 1971. This led to the closure of Karaağaç station, which was closed to railway traffic on 4 October of the same year.

In 1989, Optima Tours began operating a motorail train service from Edirne to Villach, Austria. The train, named the Optima Express, was the first motorail train service in Turkey.

Edirne station was electrified in 1997, with 25 kV AC, 60 HZ overhead wire.

== Services ==
Between 1991 and March 2013 the Balkan Express, (an international overnight InterCity sleeper train jointly operated by the Turkish State Railways (TCDD), Bulgarian State Railways (BDŽ), Serbian Railways (ŽS) and Hungarian State Railways (MÁV) linking Istanbul's Sirkeci station, Turkey and Budapest Keleti station, via Sofia, Bulgaria and Belgrade, Serbia, made scheduled stops at Edirne.

== See also ==
- Van railway station – Opened in the same year, with the near-identical station buildings.
