= Çerkezköy railway station =

Railway station in Turkey

Çerkezköy
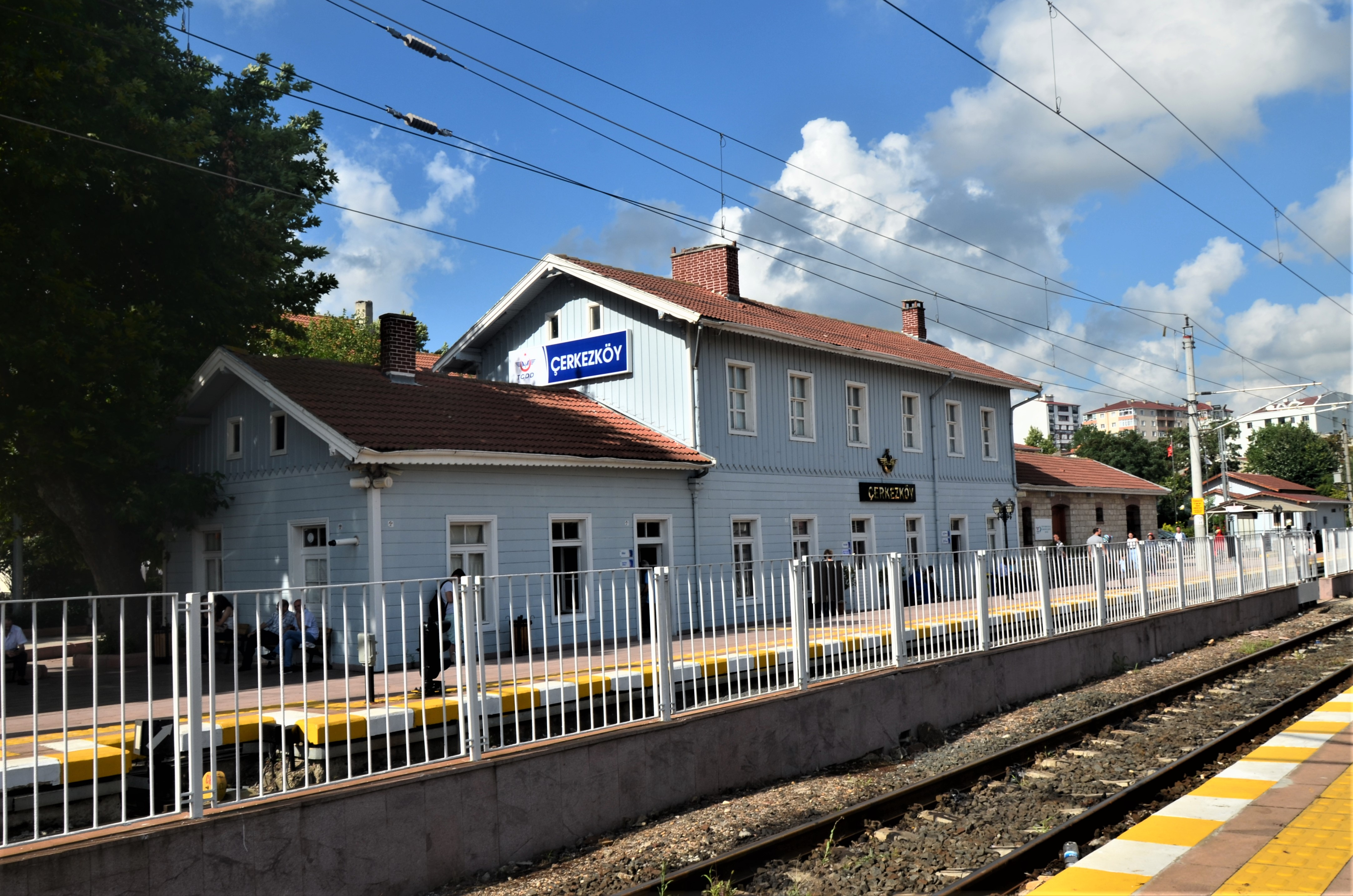
- Çerkezköy railway station

General information
- Location: İstasyon Cd. 64, İstasyon Mah., 59500; Çerkezköy/Tekirdağ; Turkey
- Coordinates: 39.2792°N 27.0106°E
- System: TCDD intercity and regional rail station
- Owner: Turkish State Railways
- Operator: TCDD Taşımacılık
- Lines: Istanbul–Pythio railway Istanbul–Kapıkule railway
- Platforms: 2 (1 side platform, 1 island platform)
- Tracks: 3

Construction
- Structure type: At-grade
- Parking: Yes

History
- Opened: 4 April 1873
- Electrified: 2016; 25 kV AC, 60 Hz

Services
Preceding station	TCDD Taşımacılık	Following station
Alpullu towards Sofia	Istanbul–Sofia Express	Istanbul Terminus
Alpullu towards Bucharest	Bosphorus Express	Istanbul Terminus
Büyükkarıştıran YHT towards Edirne	Yüksek Hızlı Tren	Terminus
Velimeşe towards Uzunköprü	Istanbul–Uzunköprü	Sinekli towards Istanbul
Former services
Preceding station	Turkish State Railways	Following station
Alpullu towards Belgrade	Balkan Express	Halkalı towards Istanbul
Location

Çerkezköy railway station is a railway station in Çerkezköy, Turkey. TCDD Taşımacılık operates three daily (four in summer months) trains, from Istanbul, that stop at the station. Two of these trains are international trains to Sofia, Bulgaria and Bucharest, Romania, the latter being seasonal. The other two trains are regional services to Kapıkule and Istanbul.

Çerkezköy has two platforms serving three tracks. Adjacent to the platforms are a small freight yard, which handles traffic from the nearby logistics facility.

The station was originally opened in 1873 by the Oriental Railway as part of their railway from Istanbul to Vienna.

Between 1991 and March 2013 the Balkan Express, (an international overnight InterCity sleeper train jointly operated by the Turkish State Railways (TCDD), Bulgarian State Railways (BDŽ), Serbian Railways (ŽS) and Hungarian State Railways (MÁV) linking Istanbul's Sirkeci station, Turkey and Budapest Keleti station, via Sofia, Bulgaria and Belgrade, Serbia, made scheduled stops at Çerkezköy.

== Images ==
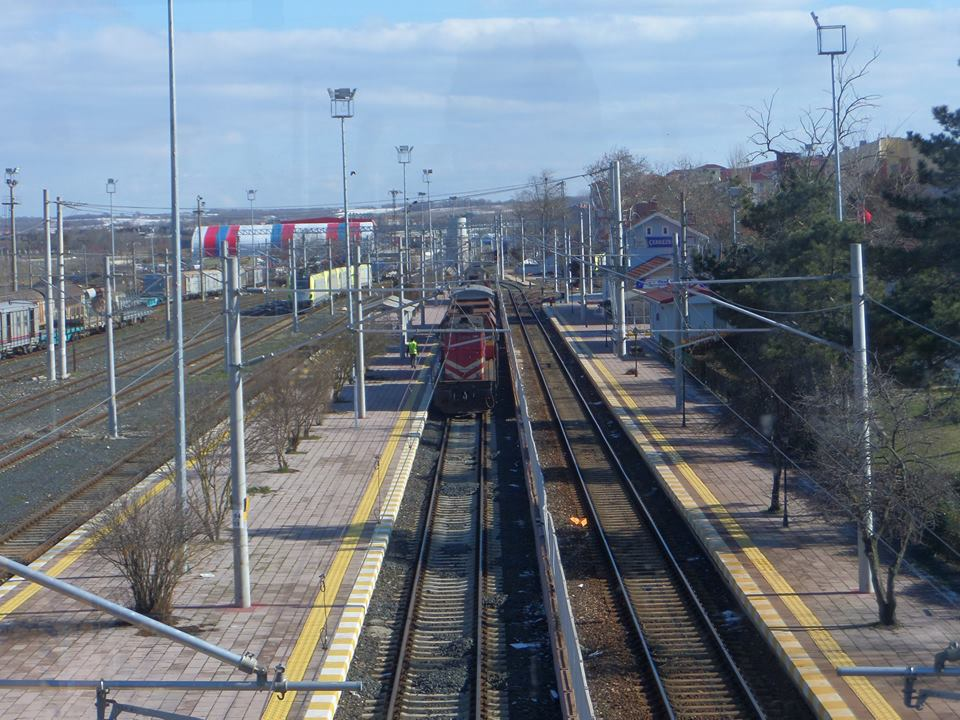
The station platforms.
