= Bahçıvanova railway station =

Railway station in Turkey

BAHÇIVANOVA

General information
- Location: D.550, 22360; Uzunköprü/Edirne; Turkey
- Coordinates: 41.4119°N 26.8226°E
- System: TCDD regional rail station
- Owner: Turkish State Railways
- Operator: TCDD Taşımacılık
- Line: Pehlivanköy–Svilengrad railway
- Platforms: 1 side platform
- Tracks: 1

Construction
- Structure type: At-grade

History
- Opened: 1971

Services
Preceding station	TCDD Taşımacılık	Following station
Şerbettar towards Kapıkule	Istanbul–Kapıkule	Pehlivanköy towards Istanbul
Track layout
Location

Bahçıvanova railway station (Turkish: Bahçıvanova istasyonu) is a station near Kırcasalih, Turkey. The station is located along the D.550, about 2.1 km (1.3 mi) northeast of Kırcasalih. TCDD Taşımacılık operates a daily regional train from Istanbul to Kapıkule, which stops at Bahçıvanova. The station consists of a short side platform servicing one track.

The station was opened in 1971 by the Turkish State Railways.
