= Şerbettar railway station =

ŞERBETTAR

General information
- Location: Şerbettar Köyü, 22530; Havza/Edirne; Turkey
- Coordinates: 41.4713°N 26.7628°E
- System: TCDD regional rail station
- Owner: Turkish State Railways
- Operator: TCDD Taşımacılık
- Line: Pehlivanköy–Svilengrad railway
- Platforms: 1 side platform
- Tracks: 1

Construction
- Structure type: At-grade

History
- Opened: 1971

Services
Preceding station	TCDD Taşımacılık	Following station
Edirne towards Kapıkule	Istanbul–Kapıkule	Bahçıvanova towards Istanbul
Track layout
Location

Şerbettar railway station (Turkish: Şerbettar istasyonu) is a station in the village of Şerbettar, Turkey in East Thrace. The station is located on an unnamed road in the extreme northwest of the village. TCDD Taşımacılık operates a daily regional train from Istanbul to Kapıkule, which stops at Şerbettar. The station consists of a short side platform servicing one track.

The station was opened in 1971 by the Turkish State Railways.
