= Pehlivanköy railway station =

Railway station in Kırklareli, Turkey

Pehlivanköy
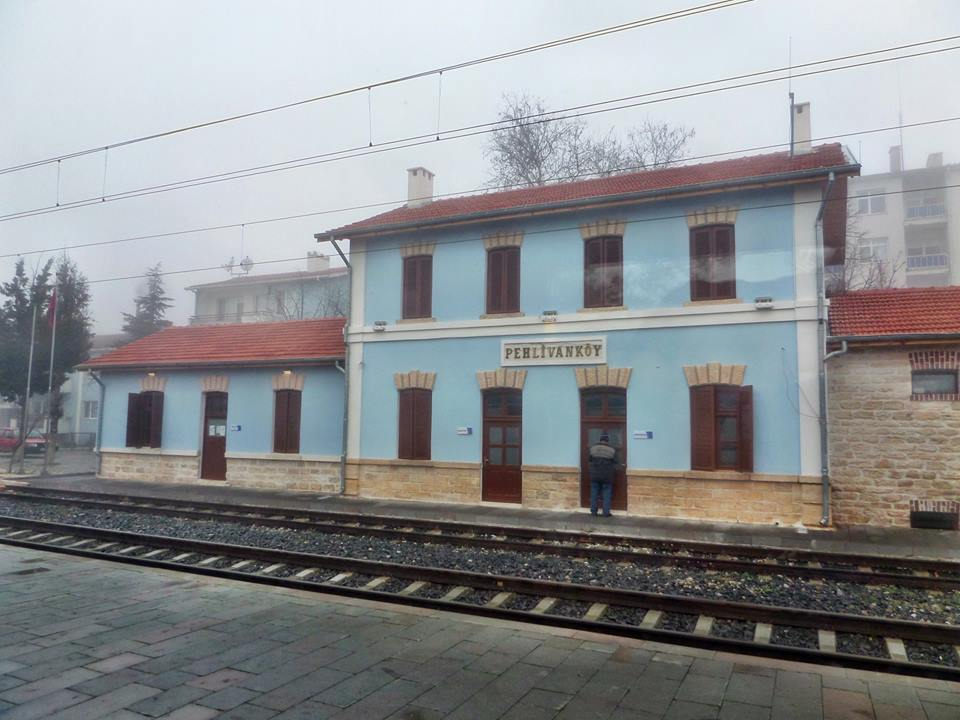
- Pehlivanköy station house in 2016

General information
- Location: İstasyon Sk., Kazımdirik Mah. 39600; Pehlivanköy/Kırklareli; Turkey
- Coordinates: 41.346159°N 26.918390°E
- System: TCDD regional rail station
- Owner: Turkish State Railways
- Operator: TCDD Taşımacılık
- Lines: Istanbul–Pythio railway Pehlivanköy–Svilengrad railway
- Platforms: 2 (1 side platform, 1 island platform)
- Tracks: 3

Construction
- Structure type: At-grade
- Parking: Located in front of station building.

History
- Opened: 4 April 1873

Services
Preceding station	TCDD Taşımacılık	Following station
Uzunköprü Terminus	Istanbul–Uzunköprü	Alpullu towards Istanbul
Former services
Preceding station	Turkish State Railways	Following station
Edirne towards Belgrade	Balkan Express	Alpullu towards Istanbul
Uzunköprü towards Thessaloniki	Friendship Express	Alpullu towards Istanbul
Location

Pehlivanköy station (Turkish: Pehlivanköy garı) is a station in Pehlivanköy, Turkey. The station is located just before the Edirne cut-off splits off the Istanbul-Pythio railway. TCDD Taşımacılık operates a daily regional train from Istanbul to Kapıkule, which stops at Pehlivanköy.

The station was opened on 4 April 1873, by the Oriental Railway.

Between July 2005 and February 2011 the Friendship Express, (an international InterCity train jointly operated by the Turkish State Railways (TCDD) and TrainOSE linking Istanbul's Sirkeci station, Turkey and Thessaloniki, Greece) made scheduled stops at made scheduled stops at Pehlivanköy.

Between 1991 and March 2013 the Balkan Express, (an international overnight InterCity sleeper train jointly operated by the Turkish State Railways (TCDD), Bulgarian State Railways (BDŽ), Serbian Railways (ŽS) and Hungarian State Railways (MÁV) linking Istanbul's Sirkeci station, Turkey and Budapest Keleti station, via Sofia, Bulgaria and Belgrade, Serbia, made scheduled stops at Pehlivanköy.
