= Şerbettar =

Şerbettar can refer to:

- Şerbettar, Havsa
- Şerbettar railway station
