= Edirne Şehir railway station =

Railway station in Turkey

EDİRNE ŞEHİR
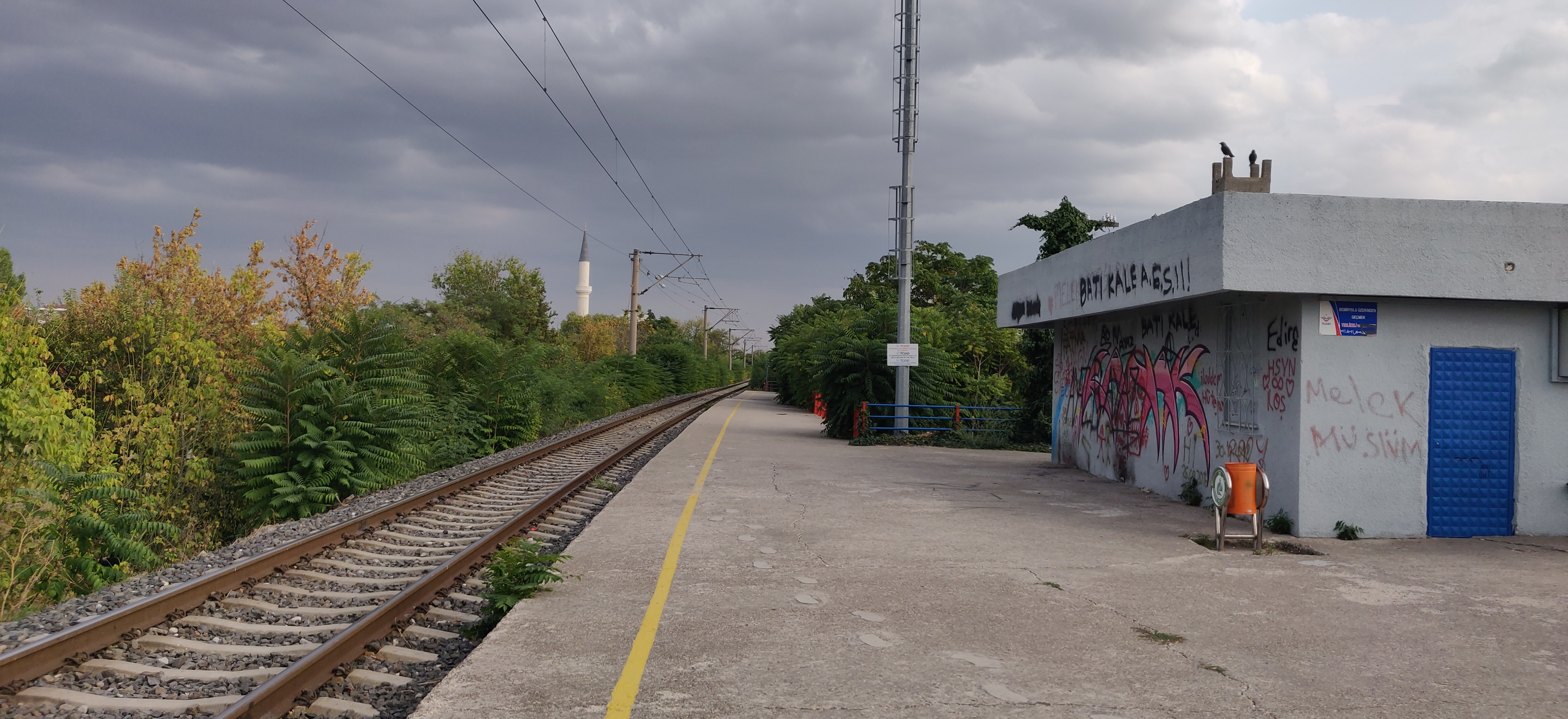
- Looking east toward the station shelter.

General information
- Location: Lozan Cd., Karaağaç Mah. 22100, Edirne, Turkey
- Coordinates: 41.6553°N 26.5802°E
- System: TCDD Regional rail station
- Owner: Turkish State Railways
- Line: Pehlivanköy–Svilengrad railway
- Platforms: 1 side platform
- Tracks: 1

Construction
- Parking: Yes

History
- Opened: 1971

Services
Preceding station	TCDD Taşımacılık	Following station
Kapıkule Terminus	Istanbul–Kapıkule	Edirne towards Istanbul
Location

Edirne Şehir railway station (Turkish: Edirne Şehir Tren İstasyonu) is the smaller of the two railway stations in Edirne. The station has one side platform servicing one track and was opened in 1971, along with the Edirne cut-off. Edirne Şehir is serviced by one train a day, the Istanbul-Kapıkule Regional.
