= Kapıkule railway station =

Railway station in Edirne, Turkey

Kapıkule
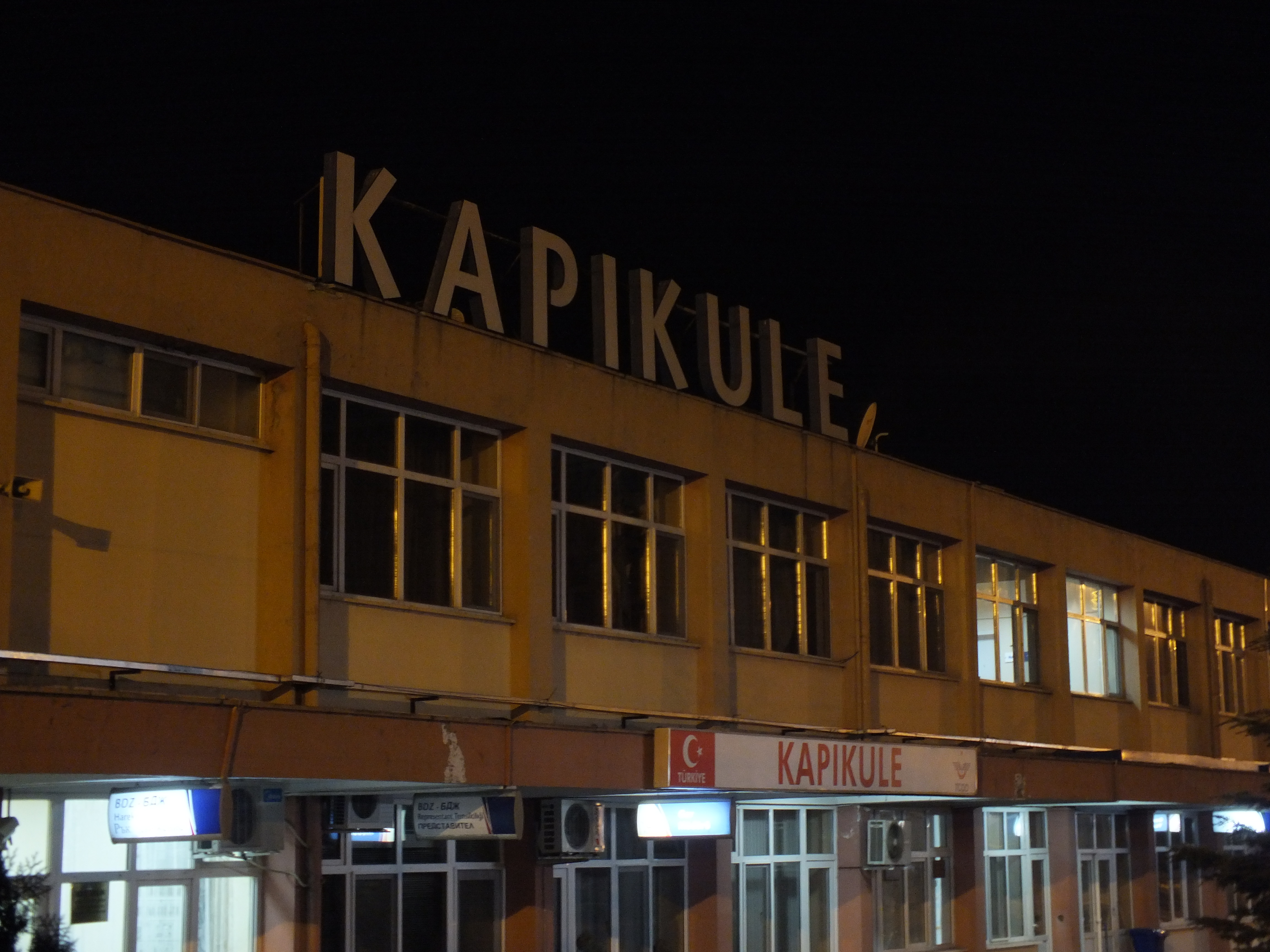
- The station building.

General information
- Location: Gar Gümrük Road, Kemal Mah. 22130; Edirne; Turkey
- Coordinates: 41.018889°N 28.766667°E
- System: TCDD Taşımacılık intercity and regional rail station
- Owner: Turkish State Railways
- Operator: TCDD Taşımacılık
- Lines: Istanbul–Kapıkule railway Pehlivanköy-Svilengrad railway
- Platforms: 1 side platform, 1 island platform
- Tracks: 3

Construction
- Structure type: At-grade
- Parking: Yes

History
- Opened: 23 May 1971
- Electrified: 25 kV 50 Hz AC OL (1997)

Services
Preceding station	TCDD Taşımacılık	Following station
Svilengrad towards Sofia	Istanbul–Sofia Express	Edirne towards Istanbul
Svilengrad towards Bucharest	Bosphorus Express	Edirne towards Istanbul
Preceding station	Optima Tours	Following station
Kalotina West towards Villach Hbf	Optima Express (de)	Edirne Terminus
Former services
Preceding station	Turkish State Railways	Following station
Svilengrad towards Belgrade	Balkan Express	Edirne towards Istanbul
Terminus	Istanbul–Kapıkule	Edirne Şehir towards Istanbul
Location

Kapıkule station (Turkish: Kapıkule garı), is the westernmost railway station in Turkey. It is located towards the north of Kapıkule, the frontier town on the Turkey/Bulgaria border. Kapıkule is a border station and the terminus for domestic trains in European Turkey. Only the Bosphorus Express to Bucharest and the Balkan Express to Belgrade continue across the border into Bulgaria. The station is the busier of the 2 operational border stations of the Turkish State Railways in Turkey, the other one being Kapıköy on the border with Iran.

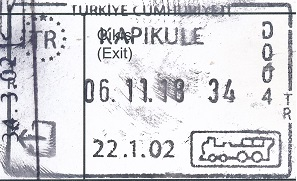
Exit passport stamp issued at the station

Kapıkule station was opened in 1971 as part of the Edirne cut-off to bypass the main line of the former Oriental Railways in the Ottoman Empire. The construction of this line, however, resulted in the abandonment of Edirne's historic Karaağaç railway station, which became first the Rectorate (1998–2011) and later the Faculty of Fine Arts building of Trakya University.

== Services ==
Between 1991 and March 2013, the Balkan Express, an international overnight InterCity sleeper train jointly operated by the Turkish State Railways (TCDD), Bulgarian State Railways (BDŽ), Serbian Railways (ŽS) and Hungarian State Railways (MÁV) linking Istanbul's Sirkeci station, Turkey and Budapest Keleti station, via Sofia, Bulgaria and Belgrade, Serbia, made scheduled stops at Kapıkule.
