= Demirtaş, Uzunköprü =

Demirtaş
- Neighbourhood
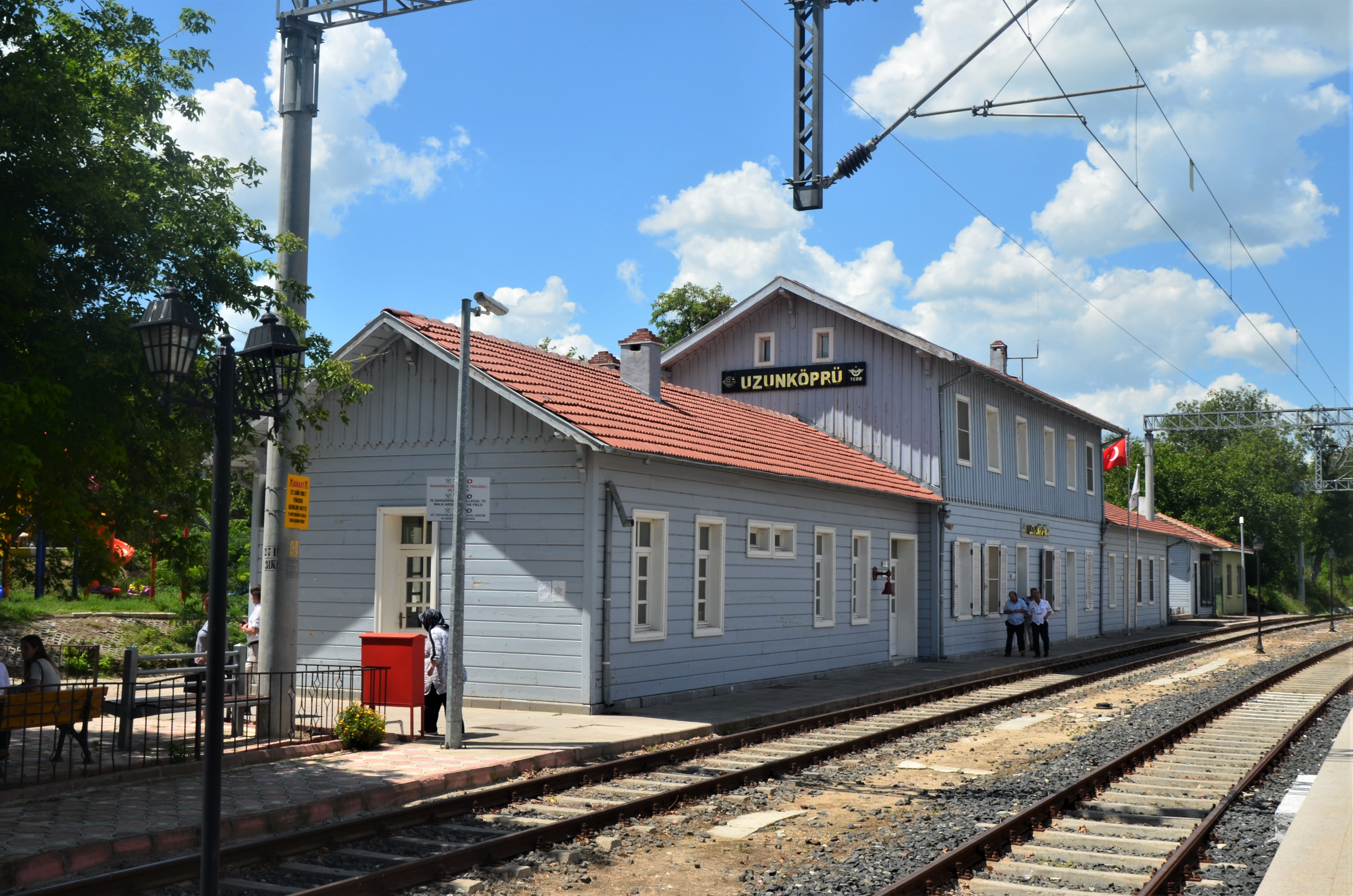
- Uzunköprü railway station.

- Location within Turkey Location within Marmara
- Coordinates: 41°17′N 26°41′E
- Country: Turkey
- Province: Edirne
- District: Uzunköprü
- Municipality: Uzunköprü
- Elevation: 37 m (121 ft)
- Population (2022): 318
- Time zone: UTC+3 (TRT)
- Postal code: 22300
- Area code: 0284

Demirtaş is a neighbourhood (Turkish: mahalle) of the municipality of Uzunköprü, Uzunköprü District, Edirne Province, Turkey. Its population is 318 (2022). It is located about 3 km (1.9 mi) north of Uzunköprü town centre. The Istanbul-Pythio railway runs through the village and owns the Uzunköprü railway station. The Turkish Grain Board (TMO) maintains a small office in Demirtaş for freight railway shipments.
