= Şerbettar, Havsa =

Village in Turkey

Şerbettar
- Village
- Location within Turkey Location within Marmara
- Coordinates: 41°28′N 26°46′E
- Country: Turkey
- Province: Edirne
- District: Havsa
- Population (2022): 663
- Time zone: UTC+3 (TRT)

Şerbettar is a village in the Havsa District of Edirne Province in Turkey. The village had a population of 663 in 2022.
