= Uzunköprü railway station =

Railway station in Edirne, Turkey

Uzunköprü
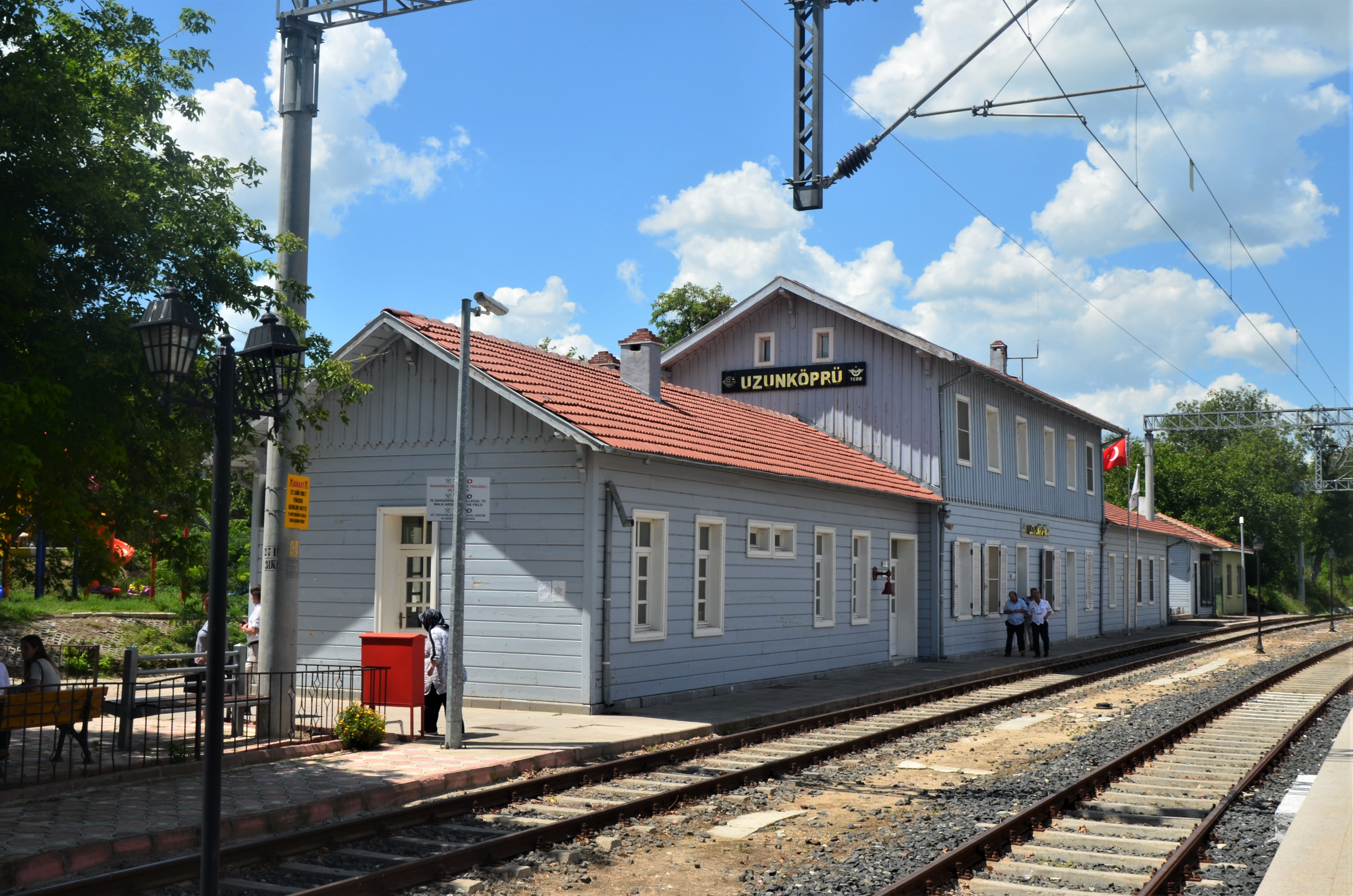

General information
- Location: İstasyon Yolu, Demirtaş Mah. 22300; Uzunköprü, Edirne; Turkey
- Coordinates: 41.295374°N 26.690606°E
- System: TCDD Taşımacılık regional rail station
- Owner: Turkish State Railways
- Operator: TCDD Taşımacılık
- Line: Istanbul–Pythio railway
- Platforms: 2 (1 side platform, 1 island platform)
- Tracks: 3

Construction
- Structure type: At-grade

History
- Opened: 4 April 1873

Services
Preceding station	TCDD Taşımacılık	Following station
Terminus	Istanbul–Uzunköprü	Pehlivanköy towards Istanbul
Former services
Preceding station	Turkish State Railways	Following station
Pythio towards Thessaloniki	Friendship Express	Pehlivanköy towards Istanbul
Location

Uzunköprü railway station (Turkish: Uzunköprü garı) is a railway station on the Istanbul-Pythio railway. Located just north of Uzunköprü, the station is in the village of Demirtaş along the D.550 state highway. It is the last serviceable station on the railway before it crosses over into Greece. Prior to the Greek debt crisis, the Friendship Express, running from Istanbul to Thessaloniki, stopped at the station, until service was indefinitely suspended in February 2011.

== History ==
Uzunköprü station was opened on 4 April 1873 by the Oriental Railway as part of their main line from Istanbul to Sofia.

== Services ==
TCDD Taşımacılık operates a daily regional train to Istanbul from Uzunköprü.

Between July 2005 and February 2011 the Friendship Express, (an international InterCity train jointly operated by the Turkish State Railways (TCDD) and TrainOSE linking Istanbul's Sirkeci station, Turkey and Thessaloniki, Greece) made scheduled stops at Uzunköprü.
