= Istanbul-Sofia Express =

Passenger train operating daily between Istanbul, Turkey and Sofia, Bulgaria

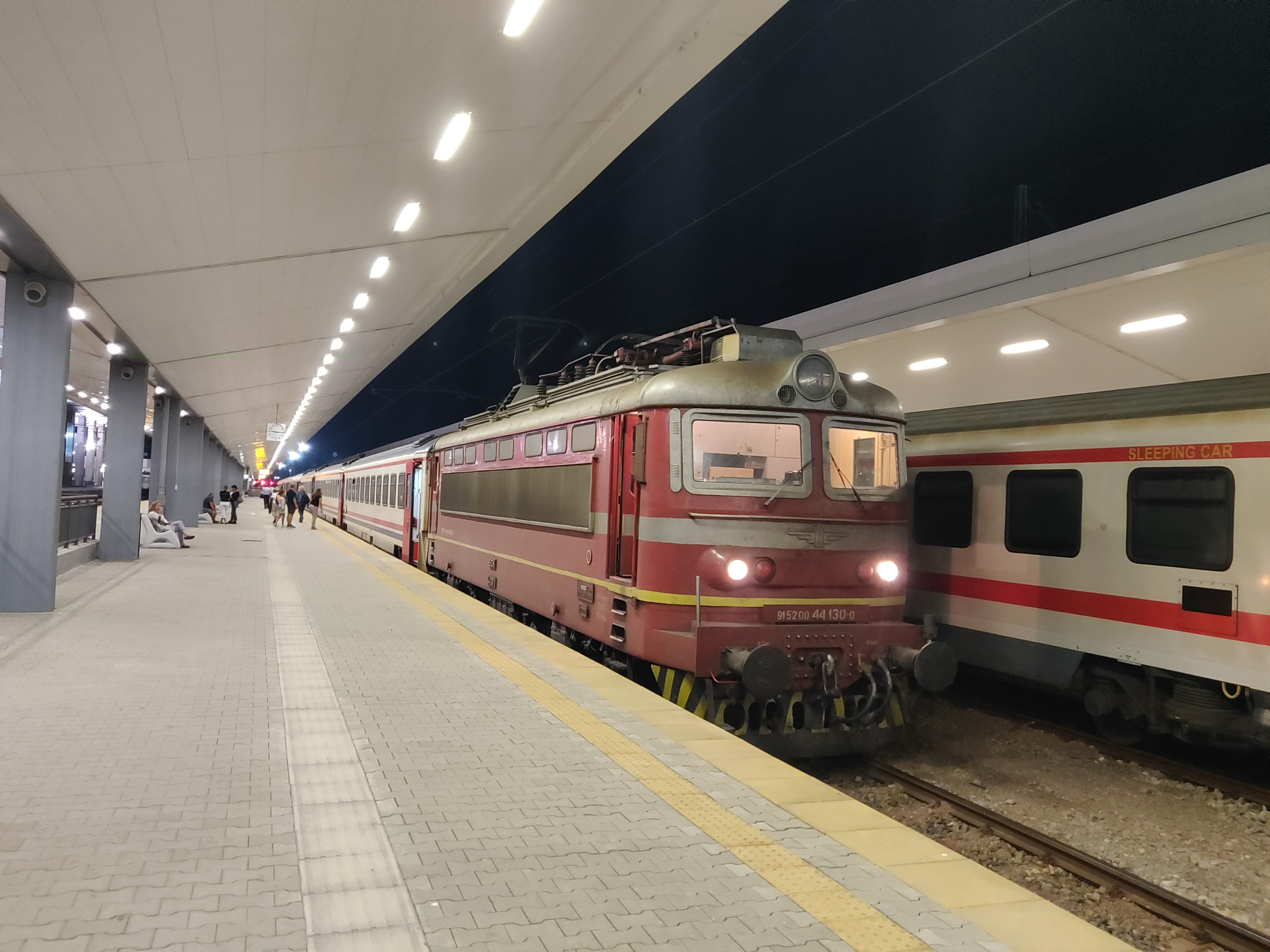
- Eastbound train 493/81031 waiting to depart Sofia.

Overview
- Service type: Inter-city rail
- Status: Operating
- Locale: Bulgaria and East Thrace, Turkey
- Predecessor: Balkan Express
- First service: 21 February 2017
- Current operators: TCDD Taşımacılık, Bulgarian State Railways

Route
- Termini: Halkalı station, Istanbul; Central station, Sofia
- Stops: 19
- Distance travelled: 571.2 km (355 mi)
- Average journey time: 9 hours, 10 minutes (westbound); 9 hours, 49 minutes (eastbound)
- Service frequency: Daily
- Train numbers: 492/81032 (westbound); 493/81031 (eastbound)

On-board services
- Sleeping arrangements: Sleeping car

Technical
- Track gauge: 1,435 mm (4 ft 8 1/2 in) standard gauge

The Istanbul-Sofia Express (Turkish: Istanbul-Sofya Ekspresi, Bulgarian: Истанбул-София Експрес, Istanbul-Sofiya Ekspres) is an international passenger train operating daily between Istanbul, Turkey and Sofia, Bulgaria. The train runs 571.2 km (354.9 mi) from Halkalı station in Istanbul, west to Sofia Central Station in Sofia. The first train departed Halkalı station at 22:40 on 21 February 2017, carrying 22 passengers. The Istanbul-Sofia Express is the successor to the Balkan Express, which operated between Istanbul and Belgrade, Serbia until June 2013.

== Overview ==
Train 493/81031 departs Sofia Central Station at 21:00 (EET) each day, while its counterpart, train 492/81032, departs Halkalı station at 22:40 (TRT) each day. These two trains meet at Kapıkule, on the Turkish/Bulgarian border, where customs and passport control takes place. During non-DST days, the train enters/leaves Turkish time (UTC+3) and leaves/enters Eastern European Time (UTC+2), setting the clock forwards/backwards by one hour after crossing the border.

Between Istanbul and Dimitrovgrad the Istanbul-Sofia Express runs together with the Bosphorus Express (464/465). From Dimitrovgrad, the Bosphorus Express disconnects and heads north to Bucharest, Romania.

== Route ==
The Istanbul-Sofia Express operates on routes owned by the Turkish State Railways (TCDD) and the Bulgarian State Railways (BDŽ).

- TCDD Istanbul-Pythio railway, Halkalı to Pehlivanköy
- TCDD/BDŽ Edirne cut-off, Pehlivanköy to Svilengrad
- BDŽ Plovdiv-Svilengrad railway, Svilengrad to Plovdiv
- BDŽ Sofia-Plovdiv railway, Plovdiv to Sofia

Prior to 2013, the express operated from Sirkeci station in Istanbul, before switching to Halkalı station.
