= Halkalı railway station =

Railway station in Istanbul, Turkey

Halkalı
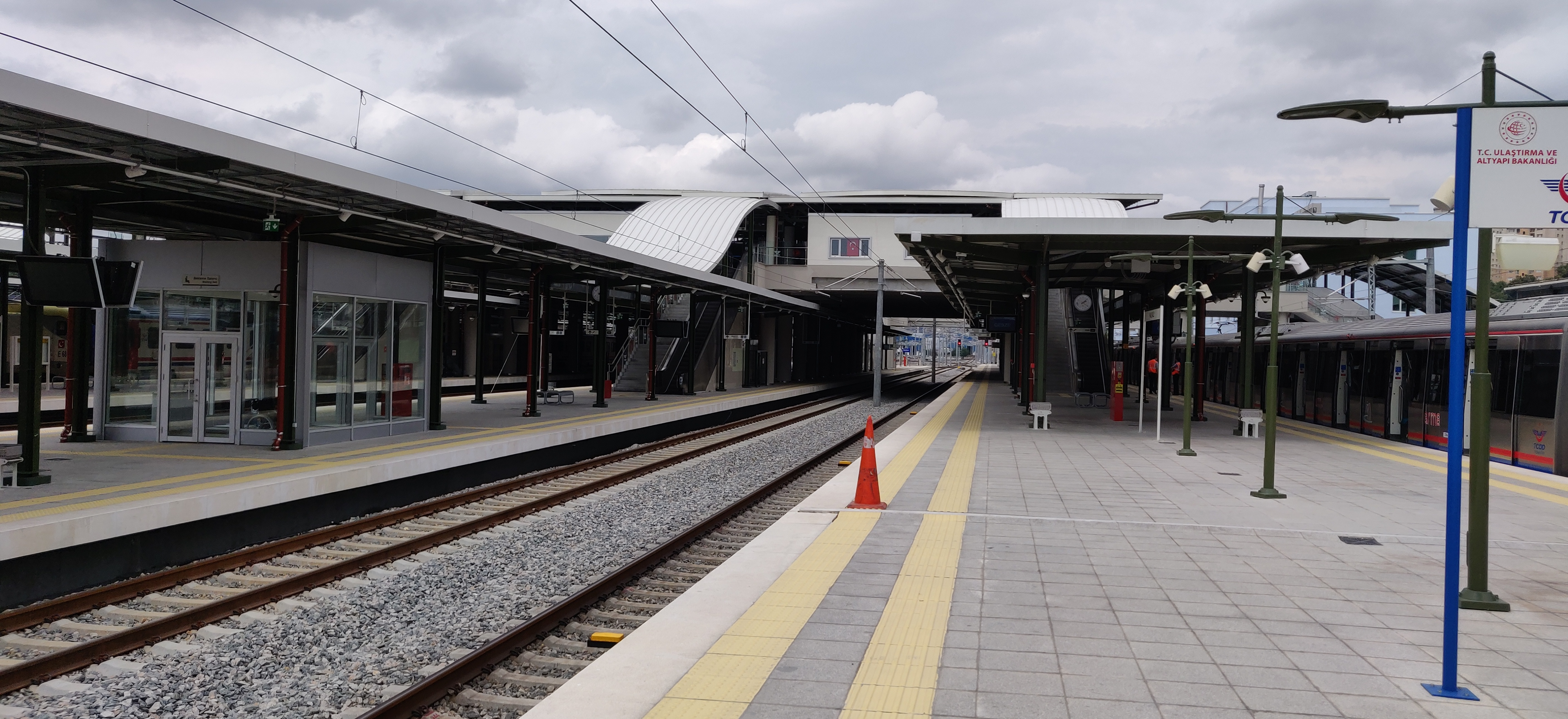
- Looking at the station lobby from the Marmaray platform.

General information
- Location: İstasyon Cd., İstasyon Mah., 34303; Küçükçekmece/Istanbul; Turkey
- Coordinates: 41°01′08″N 28°46′00″E
- System: TCDD Transport intercity and commuter rail station
- Owner: Turkish State Railways
- Operator: TCDD Taşımacılık
- Lines: Istanbul–Pythio railway Istanbul–Kapıkule railway (Future)
- Platforms: 4 island platforms
- Tracks: 8
- Bus stands: 2
- Bus operators: İETT Bus: 79Y, 89A, 143, BN1, H-3, MR40, MR42, MR50, MR51, MK16, MR52, MR54; Istanbul Minibus: K.S.S Hastanesi–Cennet Metrobüs, Deprem Konutları–Küçükçekmece, Küçükçekmece–Kayaşehir
- Connections: Istanbul Metro: M11 (Halkalı)

Construction
- Structure type: At-Grade
- Parking: Yes
- Accessible: Yes

History
- Opened: 22 July 1872
- Closed: 2013-16
- Rebuilt: 1955, 2013-16
- Electrified: 1955; 25 kV AC, 50 Hz OL

Services
Preceding station	TCDD Taşımacılık	Following station
Çerkezköy towards Sofia	Istanbul–Sofia Express	Terminus
Çerkezköy towards Bucharest	Bosphorus Express	Terminus
Çatalca towards Uzunköprü	Istanbul–Uzunköprü	Terminus
Terminus	Yüksek Hızlı Tren	Bakırköy towards Ankara
Terminus	Yüksek Hızlı Tren	Bakırköy towards Karaman
Terminus	Ankara Express	Bakırköy towards Ankara
Terminus	Marmaray	Mustafa Kemal towards Gebze
Former services
Preceding station	Turkish State Railways	Following station
Çerkezköy towards Belgrade	Balkan Express	Istanbul Terminus
Alpullu towards Thessaloniki	Friendship Express	Istanbul Terminus
Terminus	Istanbul suburban	Kanarya towards Sirkeci
Location

Halkalı station (Turkish: Halkalı garı) is the westernmost station on the Marmaray line as well as in Istanbul. The station also services regional trains to Edirne, Uzunköprü, Çerkezköy and international trains to Sofia. In summer, there may be through trains to Bucharest too. Halkalı station is 27.63 km (17.17 mi) from the Istanbul Sirkeci Terminal .

== Overview ==
The Halkalı logistics center and the old Halkalı electric train maintenance depot are located near the station. The station is next to Lake Küçükçekmece and services the population in north-central Küçükçekmece.

The terminal is the departure terminal for all freight trains to Europe and is an important container terminal, used by rail container lines IFB, Express Interfracht, Europe Intermodal and Metrans. It is possible that the Marmaray will eventually be extended to Ispartakule, which may cause further construction works and closures in the future.

As Halkalı is now surrounded by residential areas due to the growth of the city, its role as the main customs post for trucks to Europe is due to end, with trucks using the new Muratbey Customs Office (Muratbey Gümrük Müdürlüğü) in Çatalca instead.

Between July 2005 and February 2011 the Friendship Express, (an international InterCity train jointly operated by the Turkish State Railways (TCDD) and TrainOSE linking Istanbul's Sirkeci station, Turkey and Thessaloniki, Greece) made scheduled stops at Halkalı.

Between 1991 and March 2013 the Balkan Express, (an international overnight InterCity sleeper train jointly operated by the Turkish State Railways (TCDD), Bulgarian State Railways (BDŽ), Serbian Railways (ŽS) and Hungarian State Railways (MÁV) linking Istanbul's Sirkeci station, Turkey and Budapest Keleti station, via Sofia, Bulgaria and Belgrade, Serbia, made scheduled stops at Halkalı.

On 20 June 2026, an extension of Istanbul Metro Line 11 from the station to the new Istanbul Airport opened, allowing passengers to reach the airport in 30 minutes.

== Future services ==
M1B of the Istanbul Metro is planned to expand to Halkalı.

Halkalı will be the future terminus of the Istanbul–Kapıkule railway heading west to the Bulgarian border, just west of Edirne. The railway has been under construction since 2019 and is expected to open in 2028.
