= Balkan Express (train) =

Overnight train operating between İstanbul and Belgrade

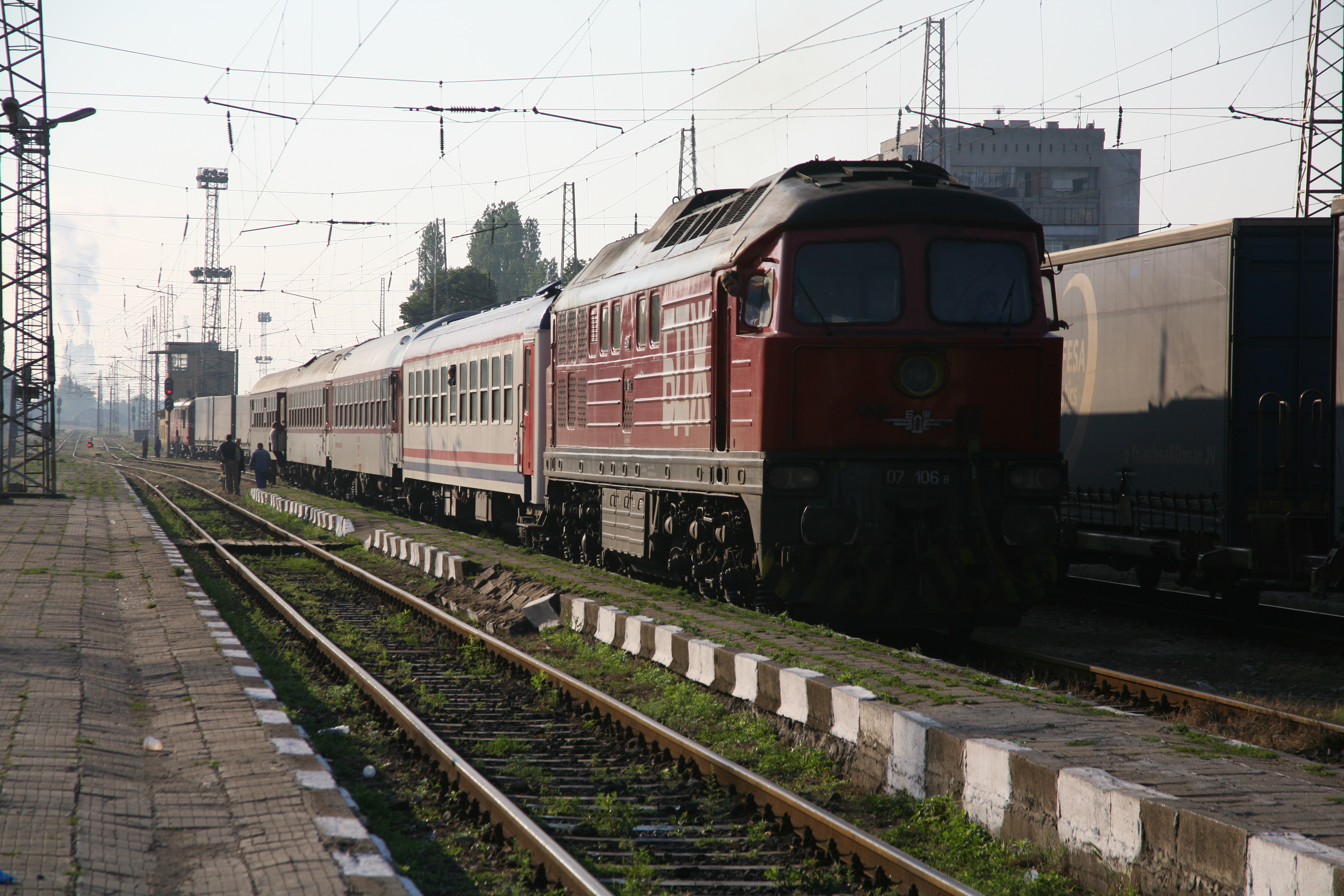
- The Balkan Express at Dimitrovgrad, with a BDŽ Class 07 locomotive.

Overview
- Service type: Inter City
- Status: Discontinued
- Locale: Southeastern Europe
- First service: 1991
- Last service: 2013
- Successor: Istanbul-Sofia Express
- Former operators: TCDD; BDŽ; ŽS (2005–2013); JŽ (1991–2005); MÁV (1991–2000)

Route
- Termini: Sirkeci station, Istanbul; Main station, Belgrade (2000–2013); Keleti station, Budapest (1991–2000)
- Average journey time: 21 hours, 55 minutes
- Train numbers: 490/491 (1993–2013); 412/413 (1991–1993)

On-board services
- Classes: 2nd, 1st
- Disabled access: Limited, due to older equipment
- Seating arrangements: Open coach car; Couchette car
- Sleeping arrangements: Couchette car; Sleeping car
- Baggage facilities: Overhead racks

Technical
- Track gauge: 1,435 mm (4 ft 8 1/2 in)
- Electrification: 25 kV AC, 50 Hz; Istanbul-Kapıkule; Plovdiv-Dmitrovgrad; Niš-Belgrade

The Balkan Express (Turkish: Balkan Ekspresi) was an international overnight passenger train that ran between Istanbul, Turkey and Belgrade, Serbia, via Sofia, Bulgaria. The train began operations in 1991 from Istanbul to Budapest, Hungary, but was cut back to Belgrade after 2000. Service was discontinued in March 2013, when Sirkeci station closed for the construction of the Marmaray commuter rail network. In 2017, the Istanbul-Sofia Express was inaugurated as a successor to the Balkan Express, although the route was shortened to Sofia.

== History ==
The name "Balkan Express" was used on a number of different train services from Europe to Istanbul, before the modern iteration of the train.

=== Previous Iterations ===
The Balkan Express was launched on 1 January 1916 as a sleeping car service between Berlin and Istanbul. The twice weekly service had a schedule of 58 hours for the 1,200 miles (1,900 km), and it ran through Dresden, Vienna, Belgrade and Sofia. Departures were from Berlin on Wednesdays and Saturdays, and Istanbul on Tuesdays and Saturdays. The train was discontinued in October 1918.

From 1927 the name was given to a train service between the Hook of Holland and Istanbul. With a connecting London and North Eastern Railway service from London Liverpool Street to boat train at Harwich, the journey time from London to Istanbul was 70 hours and 8 minutes. In 1935, the service was accelerated and three hours was cut from the schedule.

In May 1955 a new Balkan Express was launched from Vienna via Graz and Belgrade (avoiding Bulgaria) to Athens and Istanbul.

=== Balkan Express (1991–2013) ===
Following the revolutions of 1989, new international train services were inaugurated throughout Eastern Europe. The main train connecting Istanbul to central Europe was the Istanbul Express (Ex 1292/1293), operating between Munich, Germany and Istanbul, via Salzburg, Ljubljana, Zagreb, Belgrade and Sofia. In 1991, a new train service from Istanbul to central Europe was inaugurated, the Balkan Express. This train, numbered Ex 412/413, followed the same route as the Istanbul Express until Belgrade, where the train continued north to Subotica and into Hungary. The train also had through cars to Košice, Czechoslovakia and Warsaw, Poland as well as extra coaches that were added and removed during the trip. In its first years of service, the Balkan Express was a popular train in the Balkans, consisting of equipment from five railways.

According to the 1991 schedule, the train departed Sirkeci station in Istanbul at 18:30 with nine cars, six of which would make the entire trip to Budapest: a baggage car, four couchette cars, three corridor-coach cars and a mail car. The train would reach the Bulgarian/Turkish border at midnight and proceed with custom controls. The next morning, the train would arrive at Sofia at 7:22. Four more cars would be added at Sofia: a dining car, three corridor-coach cars; one of which would continue to Warsaw. The extra cars were added for passengers traveling the daytime section of the route. Arriving at Belgrade at 15:40, the Yugoslavian equipment of the train (a corridor-coach, couchette-coach and mail car) were detached from the train. Arriving at Subotica at 19:20, the train would cross into Hungary and reach Budapest at 22:43. The three through-cars would then be switched onto the R 330 "Polonia" and continue overnight to Warsaw or Košice.

The Balkan Express widely avoided the conflict zones of the Yugoslav Wars, but was still victim to sporadic cancellations. However, the train continued to operate without major changes to its route. In 1994, through car service from Istanbul to Košice was extended further to Petrovice u Karviné, Czech Republic, via Žilina.

In the late 1990s, through-car service to Poland and the Czech Republic/Slovakia were discontinued. Ridership from Turkey greatly declined at the turn of the century, due to a growing economic crisis along with the NATO bombing of Yugoslavia during the Kosovo War. Because of this decline, only two cars regularly made the entire journey from Istanbul to Budapest, a baggage car and a couchette car. The majority of passengers traveled between Sofia, Belgrade and Budapest. After 2000, the train was shortened by 341 km (212 mi) from Budapest to Belgrade. Within Turkey, the Balkan Express was then merged with the Istanbul-Bucharest Bosphorus Express and the two trains operated between Istanbul and Dimitrovgrad as one train. Through-cars to Budapest were re-introduced in 2004, together with new through-car service to Prague, Czech Republic and Chișinău, Moldova. However, these cars were attached to the Boshphorus Express and would detach from the Balkan Express at Dimitrovgrad. The through-cars to Budapest and Prague were then attached to the Transbalkan (460/461), which became the main train connection from central Europe to the Balkan countries.

In the beginning of the 2010s, the Balkan Express had greatly lost its popularity from Turkey, as flying between Balkan countries became more efficient. By 2010, the joint Balkan/Bosphorus Express would depart Istanbul with only three cars, sometimes four. However, the closing of Sirkeci station for the construction of the Marmaray commuter rail project in 2013, led to the discontinuation of the Balkan Express. The Bosphorus Express however, continued to operate to Bucharest. Following the discontinuation of the Balkan Express as an overnight train, the most popular section of the route, between Sofia and Belgrade, remained in service. This train was renamed "Balkan" (1490/1491) and operates as a daily day-time service between the two cities. In 2017, the Turkish State Railways and the Bulgarian State Railways launched a new overnight train service from Istanbul to Sofia, using modern TVS2000 passenger cars. The Istanbul-Sofia Express (492/493) operates daily along the same route as the former Balkan Express, but does not make the full journey to Belgrade.

== Gallery ==
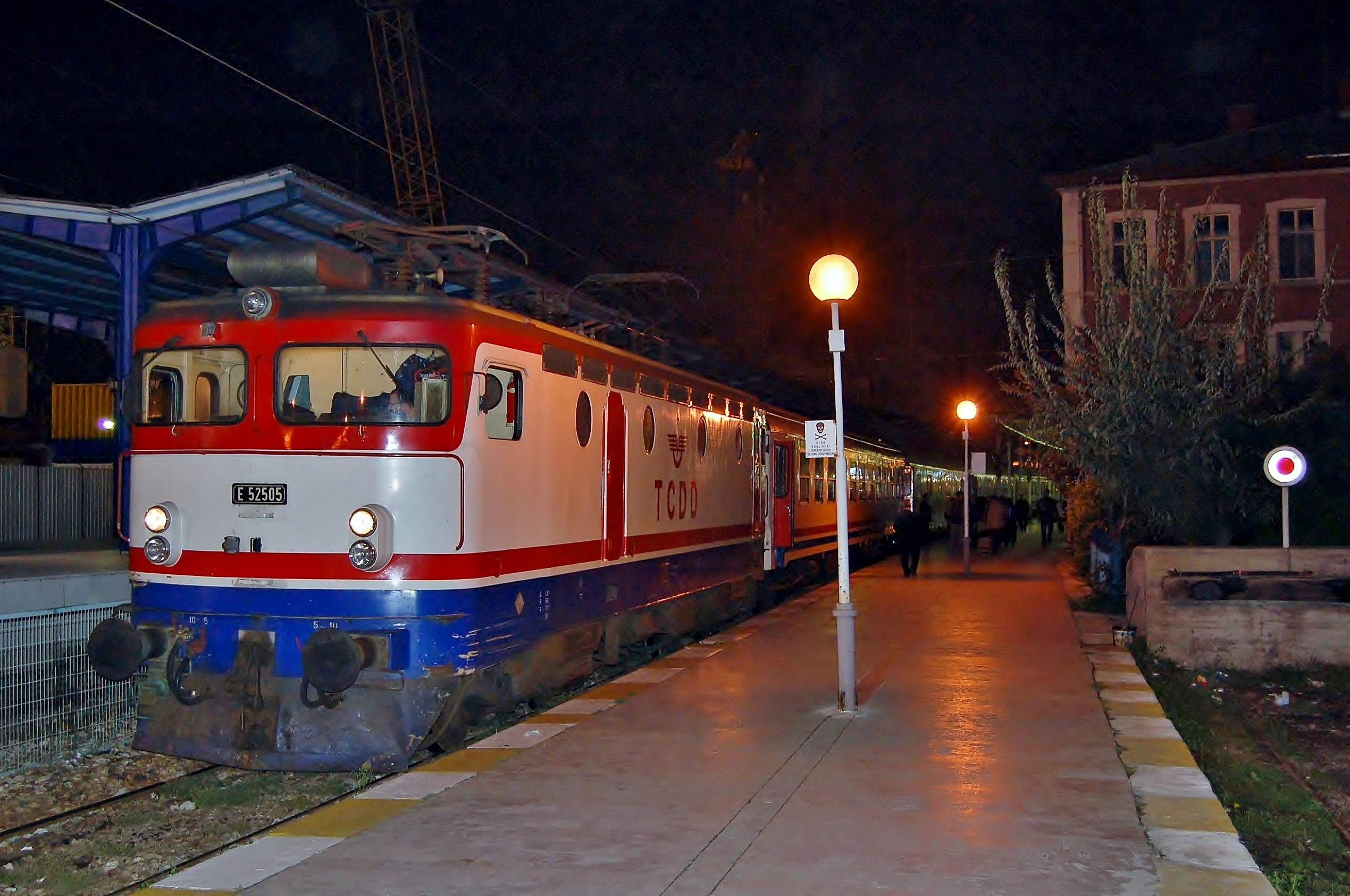
The joint Balkan/Bosphorus Express waiting to depart Sirkeci station with a TCDD E52500 series electric locomotive.

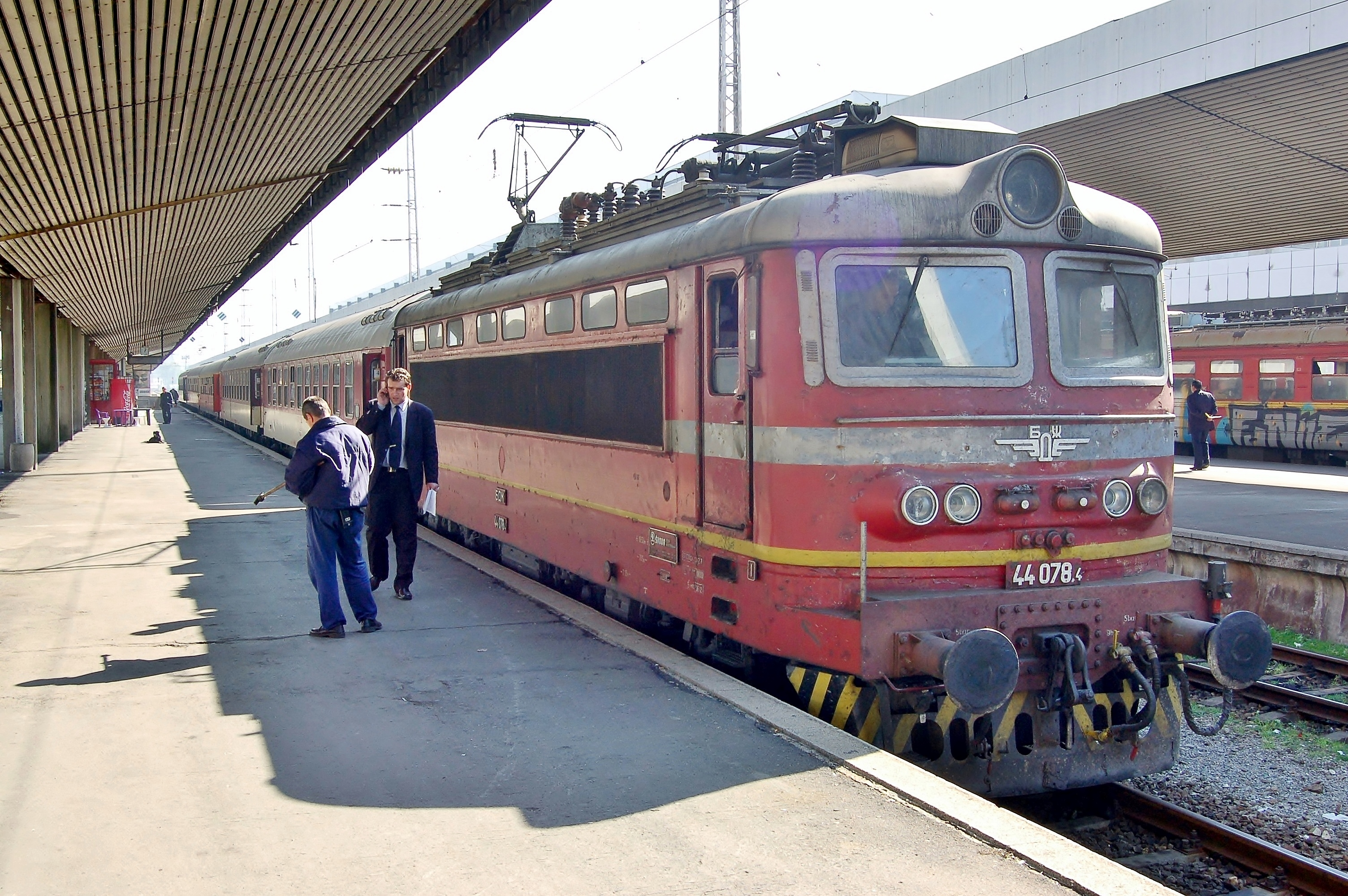
The Balkan Express in Sofia.

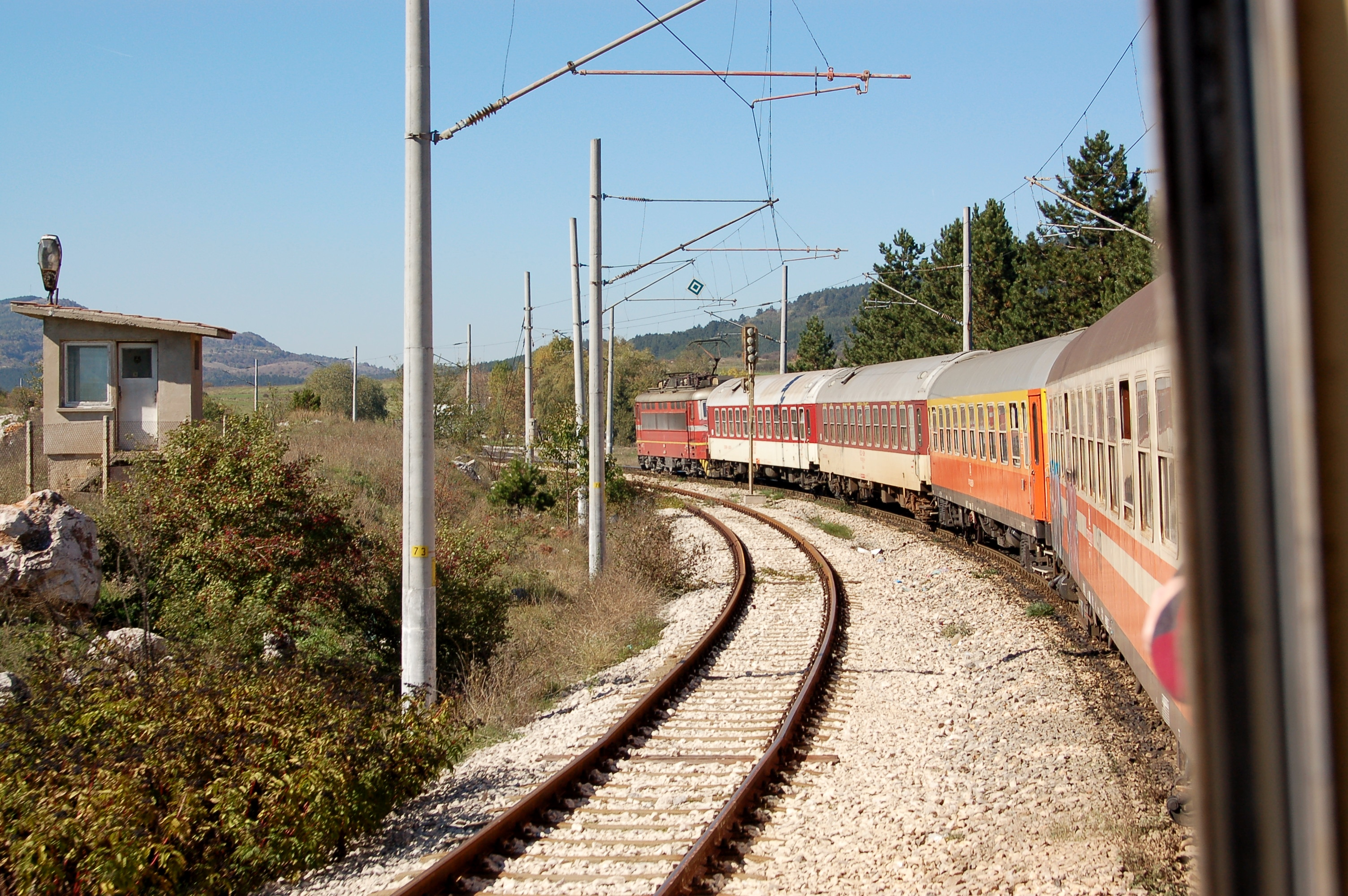
The Balkan Express departing Dragoman with a BDŽ Class 44 locomotive pulling.

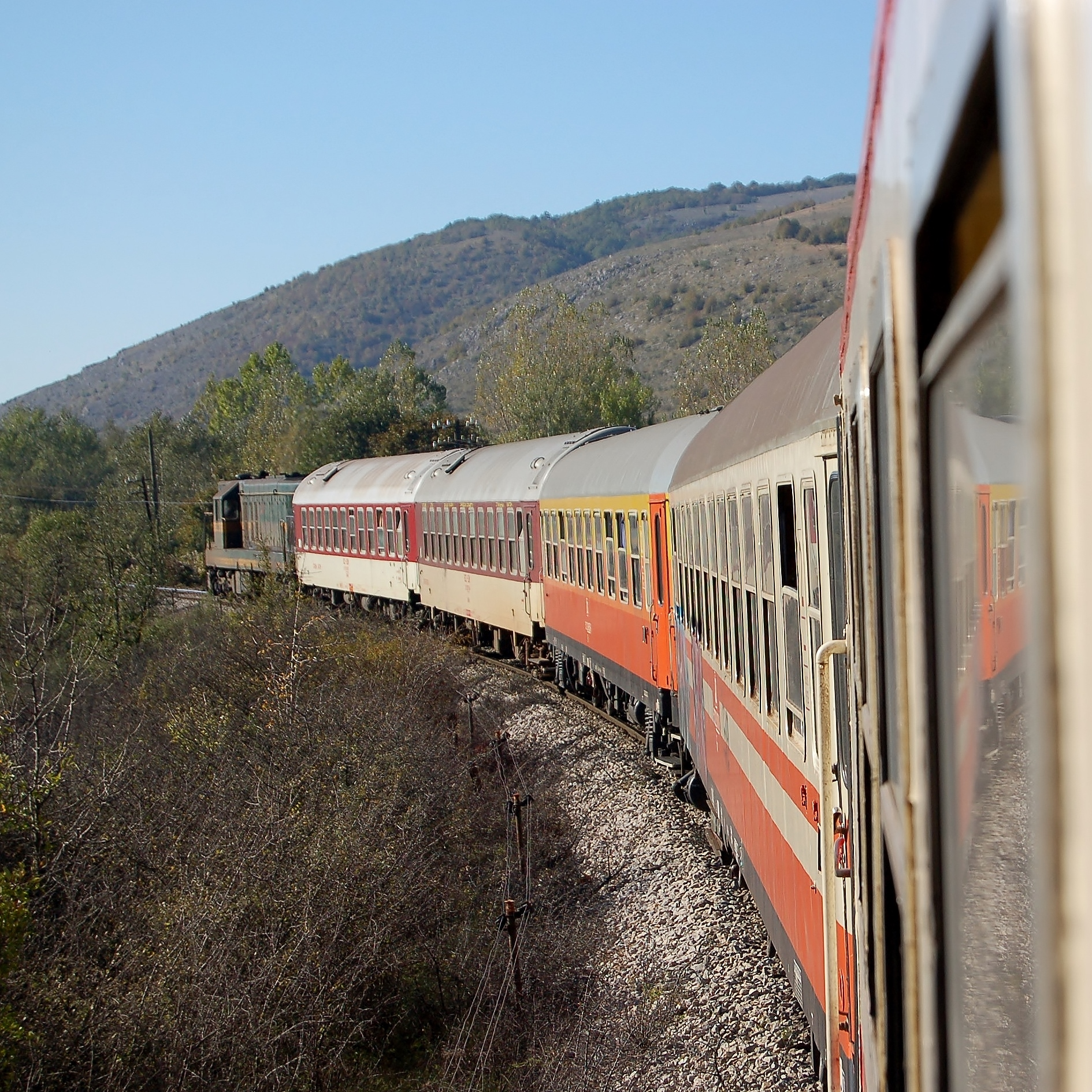
The Balkan Express near Pirot with a ŽS series 661 locomotive pulling. The train is running between the non-electrified section between Kalotina and Niš.

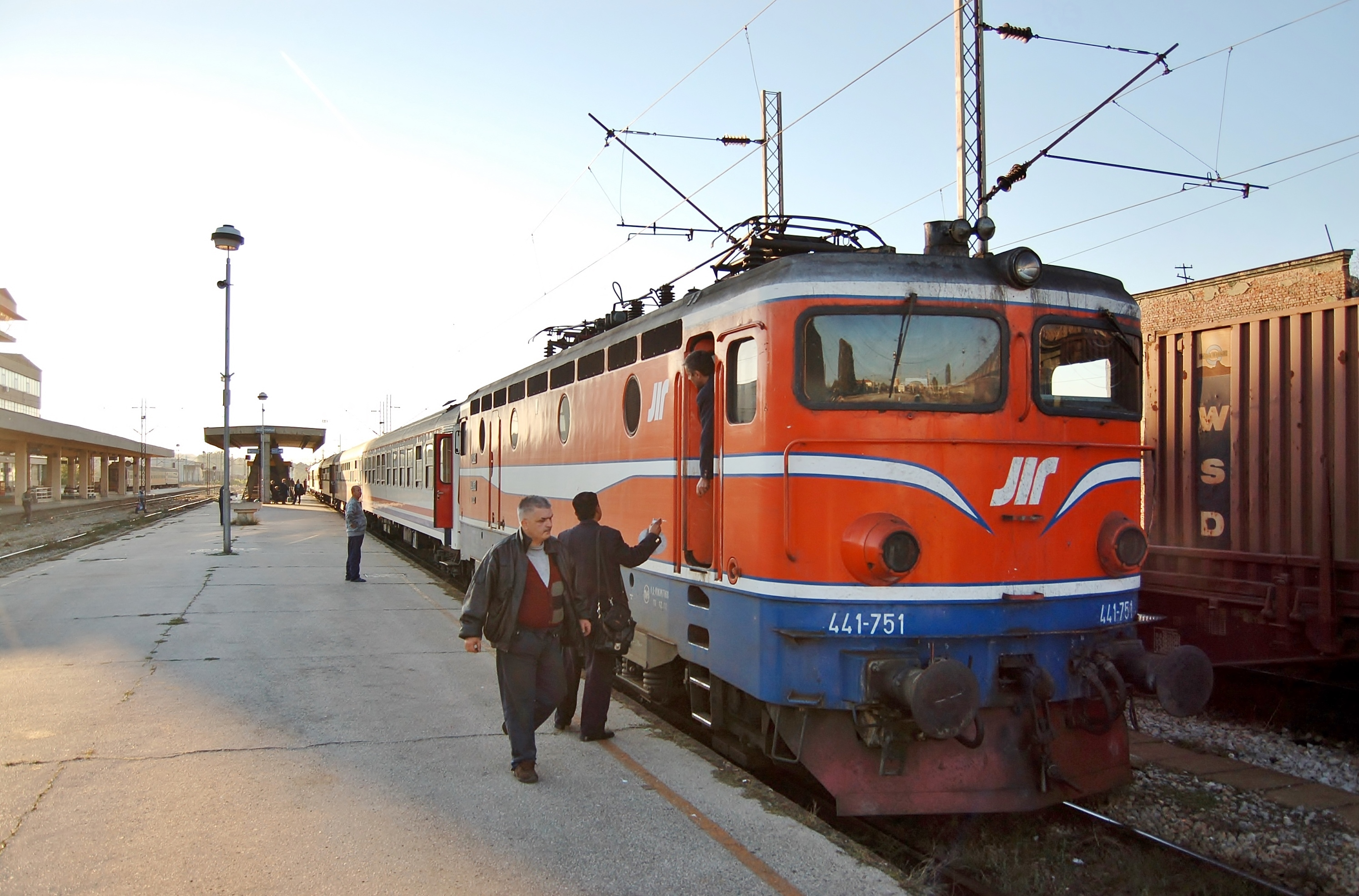
The Balkan Express in Niš. The JŽ class 441 locomotive takes over for the third and final electrified stretch to Belgrade.

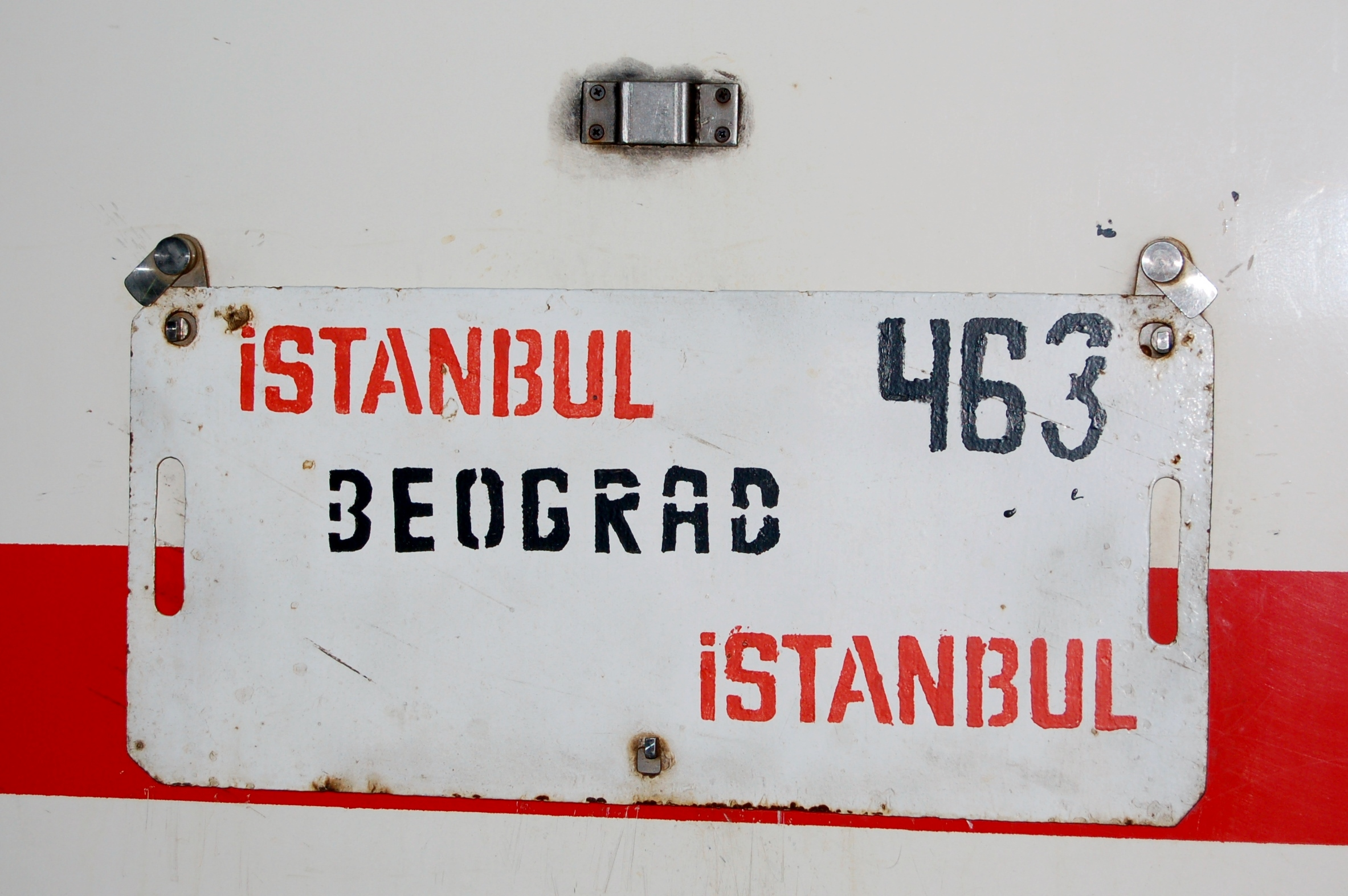
Destination board.

== See also ==
- Budapest–Belgrade–Skopje–Athens railway
