= Pehlivanköy–Svilengrad railway =

Rail line from Pehlivanköy, Turkey to Svilengrad, Bulgaria

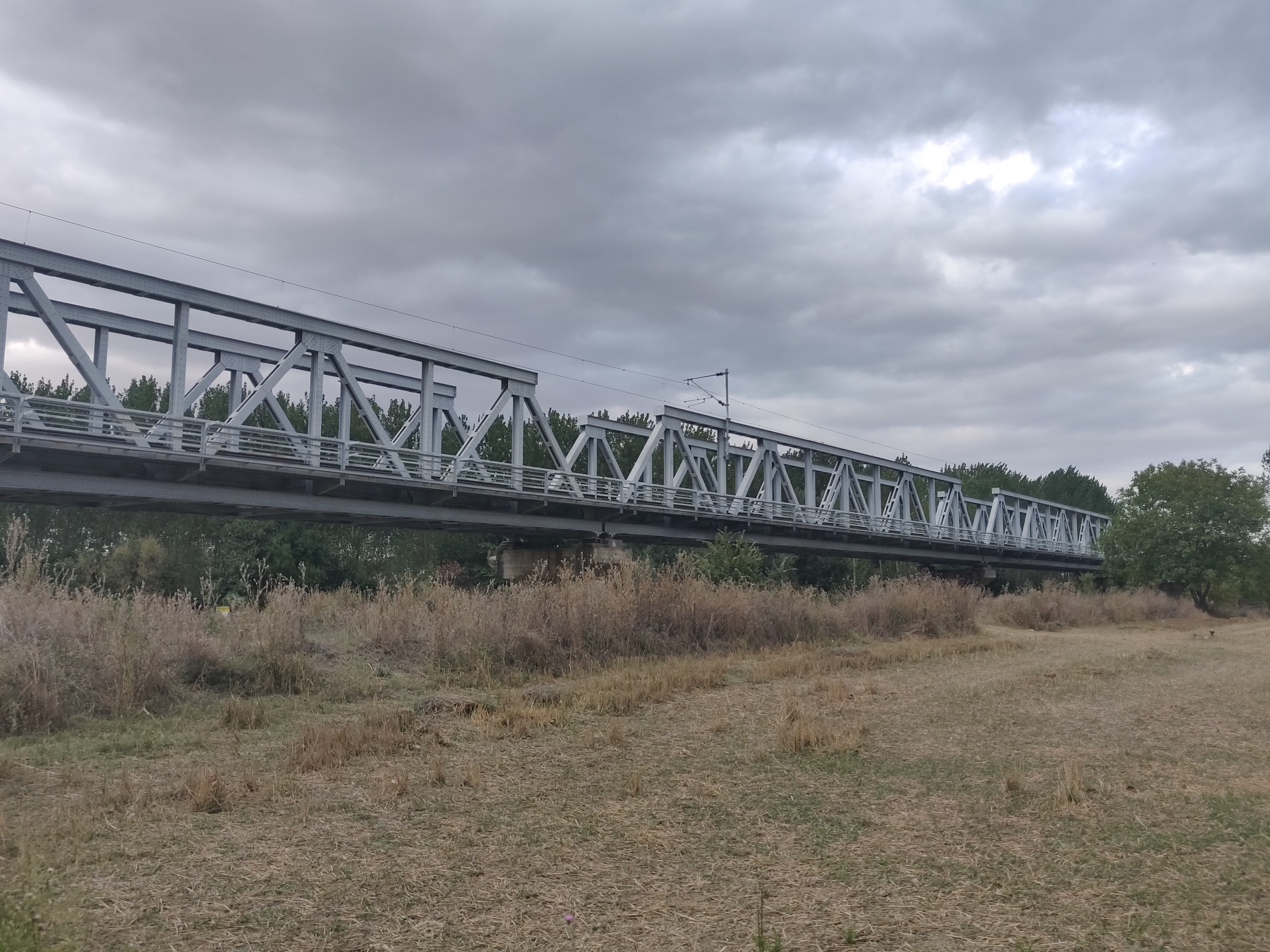
- The Tundzha bridge in Edirne.

Overview
- Status: Operating
- Owner: Turkish State Railways (Pehlivanköy–Kapıkule); Bulgarian State Railways (Kapıkule–Svilengrad)
- Locale: Western Thrace
- Termini: Pehlivanköy, Turkey; Svilengrad, Bulgaria
- Stations: 7

Service
- Type: Heavy rail
- System: TCDD, BDZ
- Depot(s): Edirne Yard, Kapıkule Yard

History
- Opened: 23 May 1971

Technical
- Line length: 80 km (50 mi)
- Number of tracks: 1
- Character: Mainline
- Track gauge: 1,435 mm (4 ft 8 1/2 in) standard gauge
- Electrification: 25 kV 50 Hz
- Operating speed: 100 km/h (62 mph)
Route map
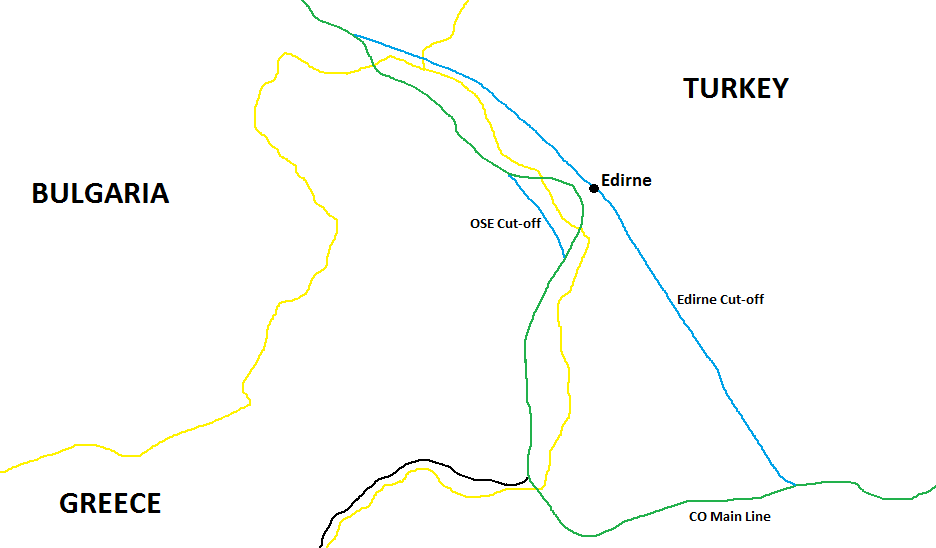

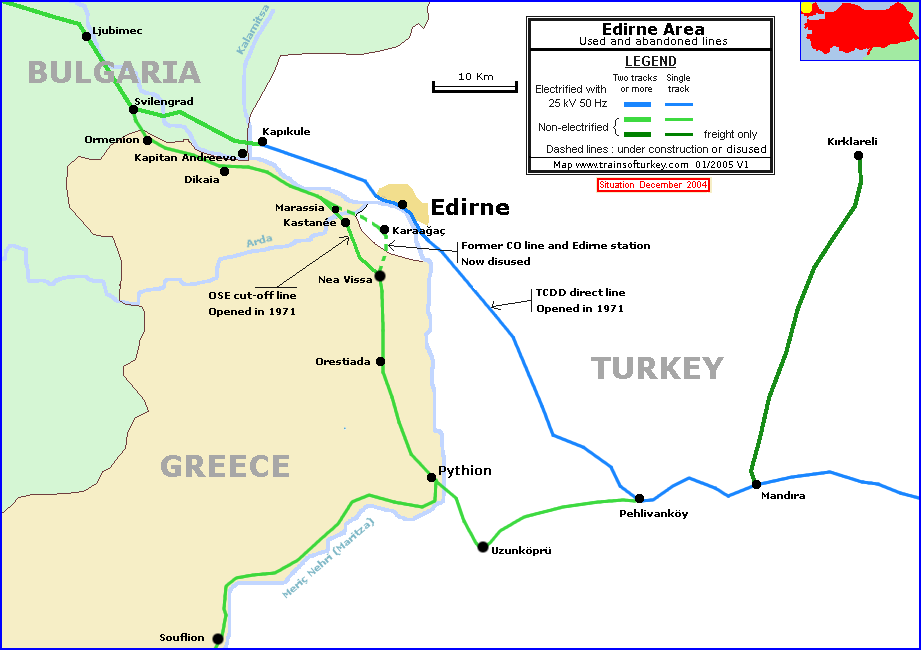
Map of the railway lines around Edirne

The Edirne cut-off is an 80 km (50 mi) long rail line from Pehlivanköy, Turkey to Svilengrad, Bulgaria. The line was built in 1971 by the Turkish State Railways in order to avoid crossing the border with Greece twice, on the former Oriental Railway's main line, in order to get to Edirne. The Hellenic Railways Organisation (OSE) also built a cut-off from Neo Vyssa to Marasia in the same year. These two new rail lines led to the abandonment of the former CO main line in to Edirne Karaağaç Railway Station.

== Route description ==
From Pehlivanköy, the line follows the line to Pythio for about 5 km before turning North West to go to Edirne in almost straight line across flat lands. Near Edirne, the line is on the bank of the Meriç River (Maritsa), squeezed between the river itself and the old city. The line goes over the Tunca (Tundzha) river and then goes in almost straight line again to Kapıkule railway station. the Bulgarian border is crossed after Kapıkule and before Kapitan Andrevo. Finally, the line will cross the Maritsa to enter Svilengrad station.

== See also ==
- Istanbul–Pythio railway
