= Former Belgrade Main railway station =

Former railway station in Belgrade, Serbia

Belgrade Main Railway Station Железничка станица Београд Главна
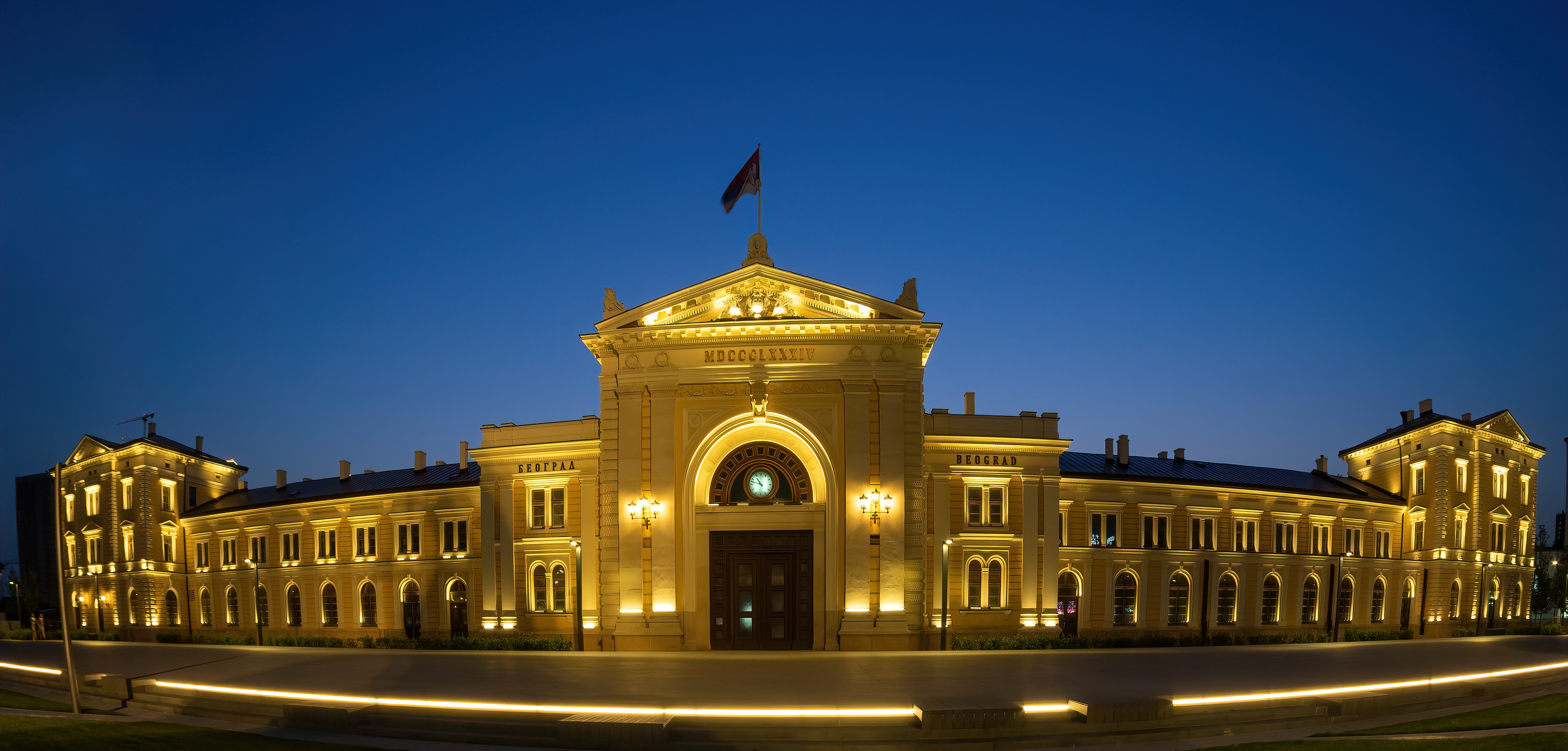
- Station building

General information
- Location: Savski trg 2, Belgrade; Serbia
- Coordinates: 44°48′31″N 20°27′20″E
- Owner: Serbian Railways
- Platforms: 6 bay platforms
- Tracks: 13
- Connections: 100 m: Belgrade Bus Station; 36, 46, 51, 78, 83, 91, 92, 511, 551, 552, 553, 601, A1, E1; 2, 3, 7, 9, 12, 13

Construction
- Structure type: At-grade
- Parking: Yes

History
- Opened: 23 August 1884; 142 years ago
- Closed: 30 June 2018; 8 years ago
- Electrified: 31 May 1970; 56 years ago
Location
- Location within Belgrade

The Belgrade Main Railway Station (Serbian: Железничка станица Београд Главна, romanized: Železnička stanica Beograd Glavna) is a former train station in Belgrade, the capital of Serbia. It was built between 1882 and 1885 according to the designs of the architect Dragutin Milutinović, and it has the status of a сultural monument of great importance. Until the opening of the new Belgrade Center station (Prokop) in 2016, it was the city's main station, and the busiest in the country. In order to free up the space for the Belgrade Waterfront project, the station was closed on 1 July 2018, and repurposed to become a museum.

Passenger trains were gradually relocated to the new Prokop station during 2016 and 2017. Most national railway traffic was moved to the new station in December 2017, thus leaving only international trains and two trains to Novi Sad at the old station. The Main station operated until 30 June 2018, when the last train, international train 340 to Budapest, left the station at 21:40. International trains were relocated to Prokop and trains to Bar relocated to the Topčider railway station.

== History ==
=== Origin ===
At the 1878 Congress of Berlin the Principality of Serbia was de jure recognized as an independent state. The great powers of the day decided that Serbia should construct a railway. Not economically developed to begin with, Serbia was additionally pauperized after the Serbian-Ottoman wars from 1876 to 1878, so it lacked the necessary funds. Prince Milan Obrenović and the government announced a request for tender and the bidding was won by a French company. According to a popular - but unproven - version of events, Prince Milan accepted a bribe of 1 million francs in gold to give the job to the French.

=== Construction ===
The concession included the construction of the Belgrade–Niš railway, the train bridge over the Sava river and a railway that would connect Belgrade to Zemun, a border town of Austria-Hungary at the time. The location of the future station building was chosen in 1881. It was a marshy bog called Ciganska bara ("Gypsy pond"). The bog was charted for the first time in an Austrian map from 1789. It was a marsh which covered a wide area stretching from the present-day Karađorđeva street to the mouth of the Topčiderska Reka into the Sava, across the northern tip of Ada Ciganlija. The marshy area covered the today's location of the Belgrade Main railway station and parts of the Sarajevska and Hajduk-Veljkov venac streets. Ciganska bara drained two other bogs. One was located on Slavija, which drained through the creek of Vračarski potok which flew down the area of the today's Nemanjina Street. The other pond was Zeleni Venac. The eponymous Gypsies inhabiting the area used the mud from the bog to make roof tiles. They lived in small huts or caravans (called "čerge"), between the high grass and rush, with their horses and water buffalos grazing freely in the area. As most of the huts were actually stilt houses built on piles due to the marshy land, the area was gradually named Bara Venecija ("Venice pond").

As such, the location was inappropriate for any construction work and the marsh had to be filled first. The remains of the demolished Stambol Gate in 1866 also finished in the bog. By 1884 the bog was drained and buried under the rubble from all parts of the city but especially from Prokop, Prokop is located in the eastern section of the former neighborhood of Jatagan Mala. Previously, it was a geographical reference, as the area was located in the lower valley of the now-underground stream of Mokroluški Potok. Earth and gravel were dug and used to cover and drain the swamps on the right bank of the Sava, so that the neighborhoods of Savamala and Bara Venecija could be constructed, along with the building of central railway station. After the works were completed, the area around Mokroluški Potok was left as a steep, elongated cut in the ground, thus acquiring its name (Serbian prokop, cut or dug through). Prince Milan personally suggested this area, which stretched above Đorđe Vajfert's brewery and the neighborhood of Smutekovac. Among his many reasons he cited the quality of the earth and the fact that the proximity of the construction site would reduce the transportation costs. However, that land belonged to his wife, Princess Natalie, so the prince even earned money from the station's construction. In a historical twist, Prokop is the location of Belgrade's designated present-day central railway station.

When the location was chosen, it was also disconnected from Belgrade in terms of transportation. The former village of Savamala was closest, but the city could only be reached using a fiaker, and this along a bypass route leading through Spomenička Street (modern Nemanjina).

The construction of the railway and station initially met with fierce opposition. The law on railway construction barely passed in the National Assembly of Serbia, while for the railway itself it was said that it was both costly and unnecessary; a "devil's snake"; a "destroyer of the people", a threat to female fertility and a conduit of infiltration by foreign powers.

=== Opening ===
The foundation stones were laid by prince Milan: for the railway on 3 July [O.S. 21 June] 1881, for the station on 15 April [O.S. 3 April] 1883. The building of the station lagged behind the construction of the railway and the bridge, so when the time came for the first train to pass through Belgrade, the object wasn't finished. As it was obvious that the station won't be finished on time, the temporary object was built to serve the purpose instead. Even though at one point in 1884 it was recorded that 5,575 workers were employed on the building's construction, it couldn't be finished in time. It had to be ceremonially open, even though it was still covered with scaffolds. The first train from this station departed towards Zemun with courtly honours, on 1 September [O.S. 20 August] 1884, at 3 p.m. As Serbia was declared a kingdom in 1882, the first passengers were now King Milan, Queen Natalie and the Crown Prince Alexander, on the way to Vienna. More than 200 foreign guests and couple of thousands of citizens attended the opening ceremony.

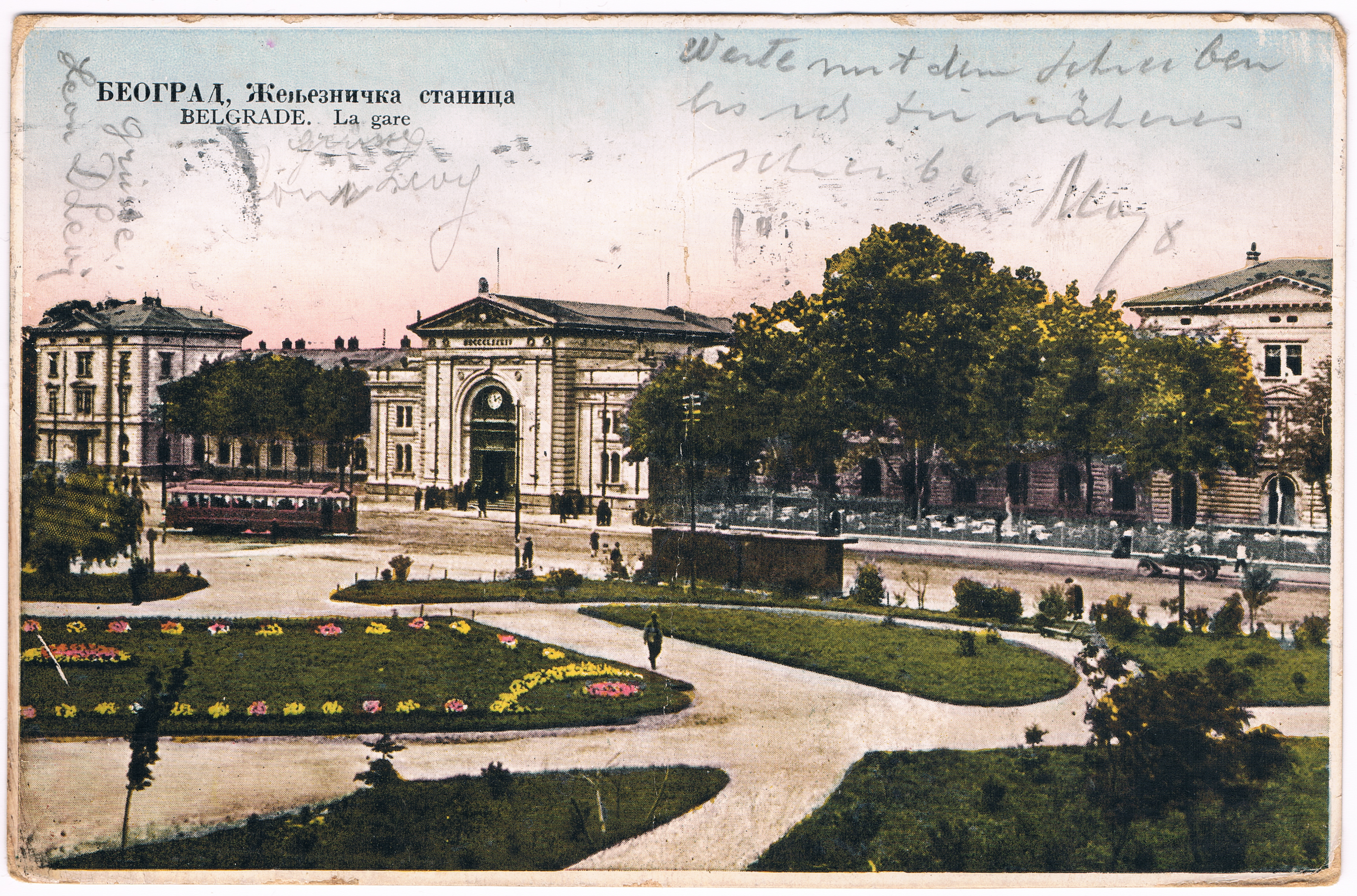
The Main Station 1929

Military orchestra played music all the way until the train crossed the bridge. Three days later the station was again decorated with flags and flowers as the railway to Niš was open and the first, promotional composition towards Niš departed. Cannons from the Belgrade Fortress marked the occasion while the military orchestras played marches. The journal Novi beogradski dnevnik wrote: "Young and old, rich and poor, pretty and ugly, they all gathered in Bara Venecija to see the start of the first Serbian railway". The first train departed at 8:45, with 100 passengers in nine cars with three classes. Just to accommodate the huge crowds of journalists and cheering citizens, another train departed just five minutes later.

The first passenger line started on 16 September [O.S. 4 September] 1884 at 8:30. It was a line to Niš, and the train had 20 cars with 200 passengers. On the same day, the line to Pest was established, and at the beginning only two trains a day departed on these lines. Archbishop of Belgrade and Metropolitan of Serbia, Teodosije Mraović, blessed the two first locomotives. The regular traffic was established 10 days later. Until the station was finished, a small building in front of it functioned as a temporary facility (ticket booths, administration, etc.). On that spot, today is exhibited a steam locomotive, just in front of the building. The fully finished station became operational on 21 September 1885.

At the time, the central section of the building was occupied by the offices of the station's personnel, telephone exchange, telegraph, cashier boxes, wardrobes and police offices. The left wing of the station was adapted into the royal waiting room, while the right one was for the regular passenger. In this section there were also restaurants, while the upper floor was occupied by the living quarters for the station's employees.

=== Later developments ===
After being completed in September 1885 and soon became the most important railway hub in this part of Europe. In 1888 it became a stop on the Orient Express route and in 1892 a ceremonial reception for Nikola Tesla was organized. The very first automobile in Belgrade arrived by train, via the main station, on 3 April 1903. The first ice rink in Belgrade was built near the station in 1900. The building originally had a gas lighting, which was later replaced with the electrical one. As it was a major consumer, it was decided that the building will have its own power generator. A mini electrical plant was built next to the station building in 1909 and demolished in 1929, when the building of the Post Office No. 6 was built instead.

After the station was finished, the area to the east developed into the square which, due to its location close both to the railway and the port, served for the transshipment of the goods, especially the cereals and grains, so in time it was named Žitni trg ("Grains square"). It was also well connected with the roads which lead outside of the city. It was directly connected with the road which is today the Savska Street in the direction of the Mostar neighborhood. There, it was splitting in two directions, one to the east (later neighborhoods of Jatagan Mala and Prokop) in the direction of Kragujevac in central Serbia, and the other to the south (neighborhoods of Senjak, Čukarica, Žarkovo) and further to the west Serbia. The square was renamed Vilsonov trg ("Wilson's Square") after World War I, in honor of the US president Woodrow Wilson and today is named Savski trg ("Sava Square").

In 1924 the station was connected to Požarevac, and further with eastern Serbia, while in 1928 it was connected to Obrenovac and Sarajevo. Soon after, direct connection was established with Dubrovnik and Zelenika (Herceg Novi).

=== World War II and reconstruction ===
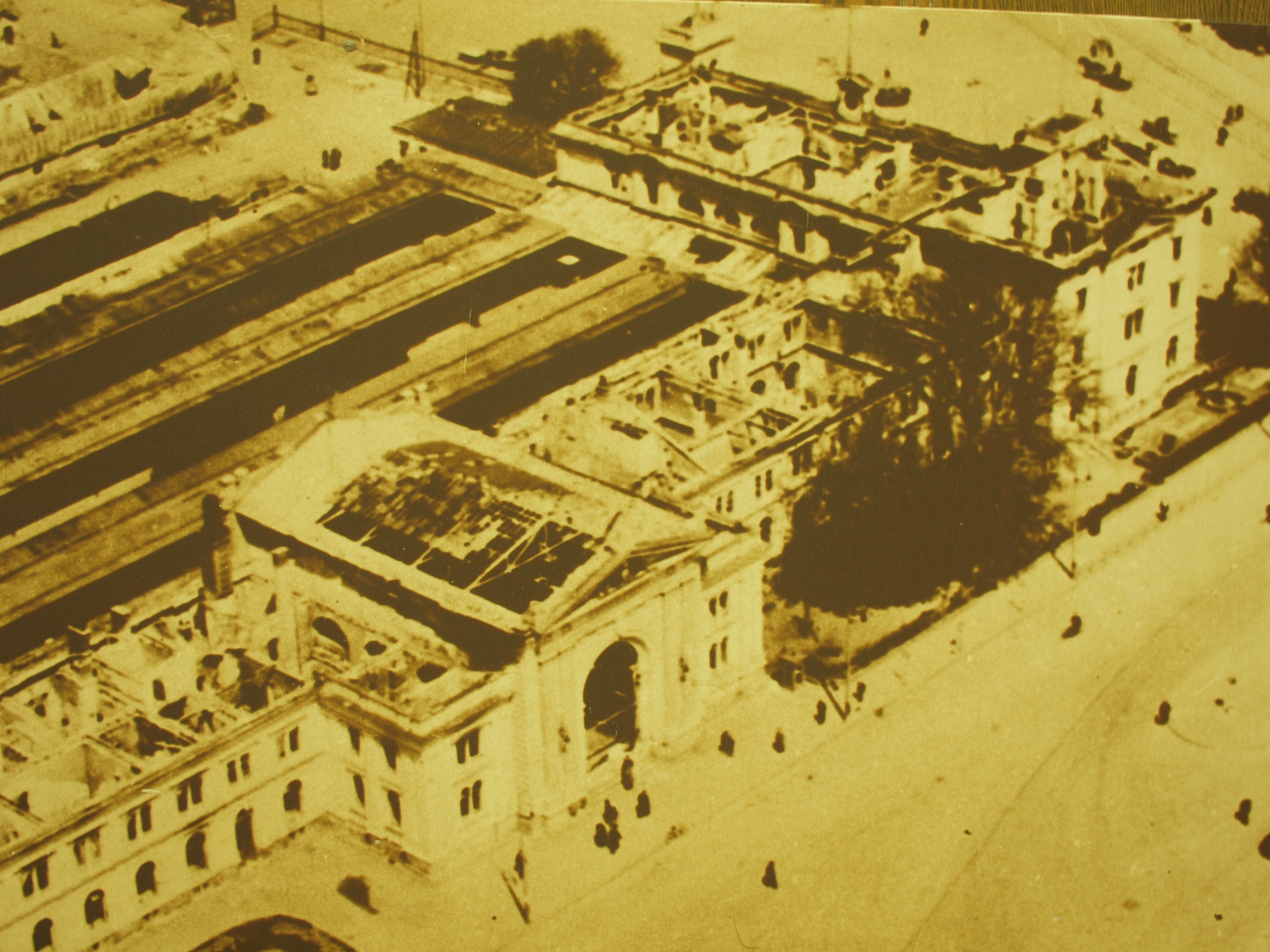
1941 bombardment

The building was damaged during World War II. It was hit during the bombing of Belgrade, part of the German attack on Yugoslavia on 6 April 1941. Immediately after entering Belgrade, Germans constructed an improvised stationary building next to the damaged building, on the location where the Tito's Blue Train was exhibited in 1980. This building was constructed by the Ukrainian émigré architect Pavel Krat. The modernist building was known for the narrow corridor which allowed for the agents of the Gestapo and Nedić's special police to control passengers. The station was further damaged during the heavy Easter Bombing, conducted by the Allies in 1944. The building was reconstructed after the war, being fully finished in 1953. Two side towers, one of the main architectural and visual marks of the station in the direction of the Karađorđeva Street, weren't rebuilt but were completely demolished instead.

The post-war reconstruction was headed by the Russian contractors. The clock, placed above the main entrance immediately after the opening in 1885, was also damaged. New mechanism was placed inside and the clock was returned to its original place, but the clock's decorative lace of wrought iron wasn't restored. The door at the main entrance were replaced, but the decoration from the same material as the clock's also hasn't been restored. The glass roof was completely destroyed during the war, but the Russian opted for a built roof instead for restoring the original, glass one. Above the clock, in the tympanum there was a coat of arms of the Kingdom of Serbia, held by sculptured, stone winged lions (gryphons. Above this composition, the Roman numerals MDCCCLXXXIV, marking the year of 1884, were written over the architrave. New Communist authorities took down the royal coat of arms immediately after taking over after World War II. The stone lions and the cartouche, the decorative round shield around them, were removed later and disappeared after a while. The late 2010s plans for the reconstruction include the restoration of the coat of arms, but none of the other destroyed or removed parts of the building.

The coat of arms composition on the tympanum (fronton) was 3.9 m (13 ft) long and 1.15 m (3 ft 9 in) tall. It was reconstructed in 2019 and made of metal core covered with clay, which is used to make the plaster cast. This cast was used for the new sculpture, which was made of the mix of concrete and three types of crushed Aranđelovac stone. The coat of arms was placed on 11 February 2020.

=== Post war development ===
In 1939, 23,298 trains departed from the station. In 1966, there were 60,119 trains with 6.4 million passengers. That same year, half of the international mail from Yugoslavia was shipped from the station. The "golden age" of the station were the 1970s and 1980s, when the peak of 150 trains per day was reached. Following Breakup of Yugoslavia in the early 1990s, abrupt demise of railway traffic in Serbia followed, consequences of which are felt also today. Meanwhile, construction of the new Belgrade railway junction was continued, and plans for dislocating main station to "Belgrade Center", colloquially called Prokop, became realistic.

A 1959 plan envisioned urban axis Belgrade Main Railway Station-SIV Building (New Belgrade) as the baseline for the future development of both old and new parts of Belgrade. The area between these two points, described as "two basal foundations", was to be spanned with nine urban blocks, spreading on both sides of the Sava. Railway station itself was to preserve its function, with additional overhaul which would make it look like the largest railways stations in Europe ("large lace made of glass and steel"). Savamala was to be populated with hotels, bus station, terminus for the airport transport, megamarkets, etc. However, disliked by the group of influential architects, in the future development the envisioned urban tissue was effectively "cut" in its Savamala section by the new projects, and almost nothing of the planned has done.

According to the city's general urban plan (GUP) in the 1960s, Cvetni Trg was envisioned as the location of the future central underground subway station of Belgrade, which would also replace the main railway station. The tunnels would conduct the traffic in the north to south direction. The railroad authorities opposed the project, so the plans were abandoned. In 1966, the Belgrade Bus Station was built, adjoining the station's complex on the north. Starting with 1967, the Yugoslav Railways pursued an electrification programme, initially focusing on railways in Bosnia and Herzegovina. On 31 May 1970, the Zagreb to Belgrade railway corridor was electrified, and it marked the first time when an electric railway (excluding trams and industrial railways) reached the Serbian soil.

On 25 September 1968, three steel-made bombs exploded in the station's cloakroom, injuring 13 people. Miljenko Hrkać, member of the Ustashe terrorist organization, planted the bombs, so as earlier that year when on 13 July a bomb exploded in the cinema "20. Oktobar", which killed one and injured 86 audience members. Hrkać was later apprehended, sentenced to death and executed in 1978.

=== Closing ===
Gradual moving of trains to the new station began in the early 2016. In December 2017, all but two national trains were dislocated to "Belgrade Center".

Problems arose immediately. The Prokop is still not finished, has no station building and a proper access road and public transportation connections with the rest of the city. Additionally, it has no facilities for loading and unloading cars from the auto trains, nor was ever planned to have one. Still, in January 2018 it was announced that the station will be completely closed for traffic on 1 July 2018, even though none of the projects needed for a complete removal of the railway traffic are finished. The Prokop is incomplete, a projected main goods station in Zemun is not being adapted at all while there is even no project on Belgrade railway beltway.

=== After shut down ===
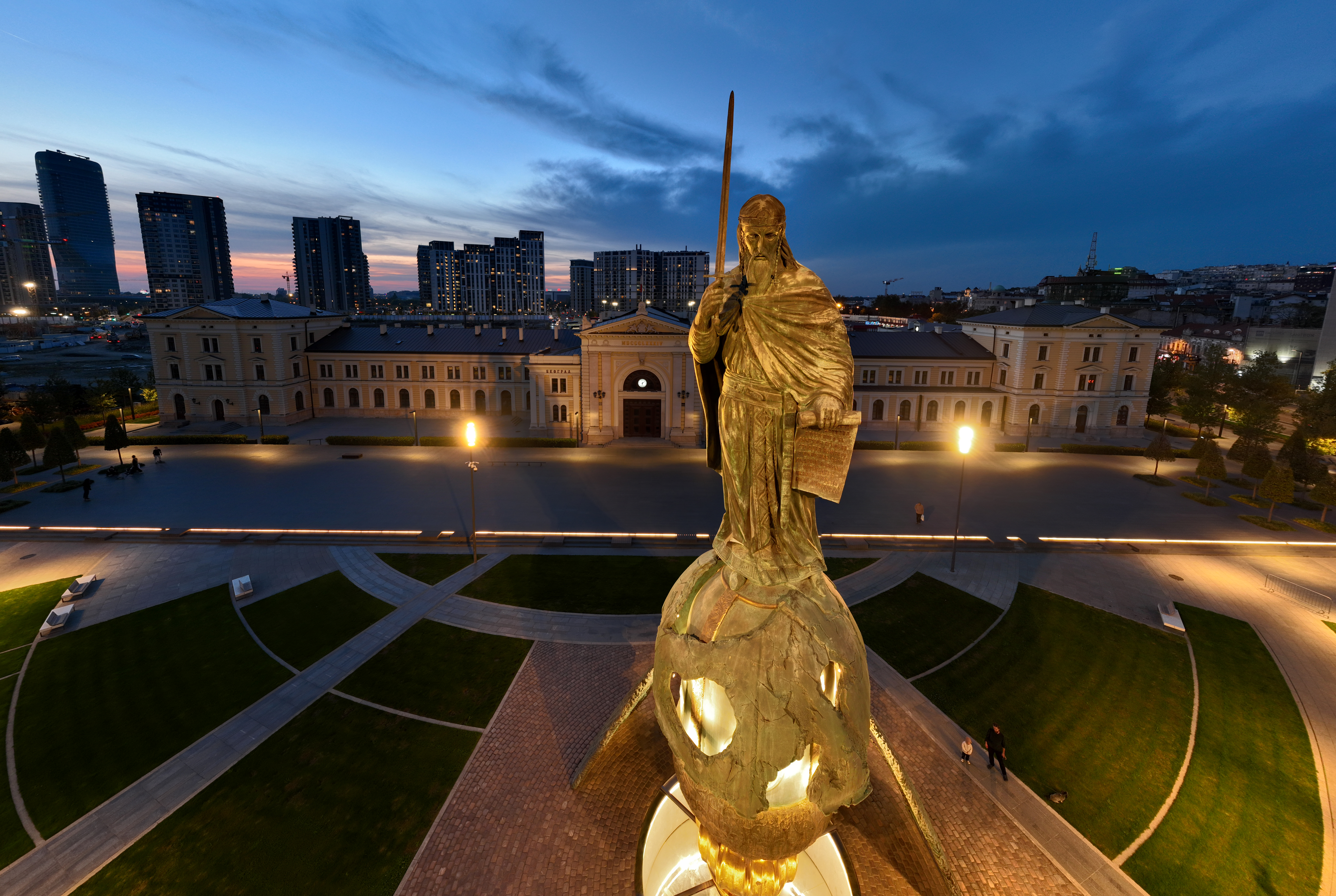
Aerial view to (closed) Railway Station and monument to Stefan Nemanja on Sava Square (2023)

After closing, the building was removed from the possession of the state railway company and became directly administered by the state.

The overhaul of the building was planned to start in the autumn of 2018 and to be finished in February 2020. The renovation includes the reconstruction of the façade and new decorative lights. The venue will then be transformed into the museum. The railway company wanted it to be the museum of the railway, but the government rejected the proposal straightaway, announcing the transformation into the Museum of Medieval Serbia or the Historical Museum. In February 2020 it was confirmed that the Nikola Tesla Museum will be relocated here from Krunski Venac, instead of the previously planned location of the Old Power Plant in Dorćol. A few days later, the government stated that they actually didn't decide where the museum will be relocated and that it may be some completely different location. City later stated that the building will host the Museum of Nikola Tesla after all, but in September 2020 president Aleksandar Vučić said that the Museum of Medieval Serbia will be formed instead.

Project Belgrade Waterfront envisioned a complete change of the square area in front of the building. The plans are to turn it into the plateau with a large monument to Stefan Nemanja in front of the former railway station, facing Nemanjina Street, named after him. The existing street routes will be turned into the semi-circular crossroad and the traffic will be relocated to the edge of the square. The existing roundabout of the public transportation and a memorial for the 1990–1999 war victims, placed in the 2000s, will be relocated. The existing buildings around the square will be kept, but some will change their purpose.

The size and the design of the monument to Stefan Nemanja provoked public and artistic criticism. Historian Predrag J. Marković called it the continuation of almost two decades long "Arkanization of the monumental skyline" in Belgrade, while rector of the University of Arts in Belgrade, Mileta Prodanović, said that the proposed project is devastating for the building of the railway station and that Belgrade is being transformed into Skopje. President of the Academy of Architecture of Serbia, Bojan Kovačević called the project "irritation" and a part of the city administration's "fifth year of spite towards the public and profession" and "logorrheic phase of the spatial auto-goals". He criticized the bidding process as fake and farcical and pointed that important Belgrade architects boycotted the bidding, adding that we "used to laugh at Skopje". Architect Slobodan Maldini pointed to the inadequacies of the competition, including the composition and competency of the jury and a fact that the name of the winner leaked 8 days before it was officially announced. Spanish work is formally flawed as it has no documentation needed, the monument is different in appearance, size and location from the already chosen Russian sculpture. Maldini stated that the competition is a result of the greed and incompetence and described the project as "unacceptable concreting without ideas" and the sculpture as pricey and megalomaniacal.

Reconstruction of the station's façade was announced to start in September 2019. The job was given to the "Koto" company, which is involved in another controversial project of the city government, the Kalemegdan gondola lift. Though the price is much higher than 5 million dinars (€42,500; estimated to 240 million dinars, or €2,035,000), which means that public bidding is obligatory by law, the government gave the project in direct negotiations with the company, citing "hastiness due to the weather issues". Government and city institutions connected with the reconstruction remained silent on any further explanation of the illogicalities regarding the reconstruction: if the building was already left as it is for over a year, why the sudden hastiness; if the weather is a problem, why are the works pushed for the upcoming, winter season; lack of the public invitation to tender; who is really financing the works - the city, the government or the Belgrade Waterfront; if this was planned for several years, why are funds secured via budget reserves and not allocated previously. The deadline was set to February 2020, when the coat-of-arms was restored to the facade.

=== Deterioration ===
In November 2020, the government decided to relocate the Historical Museum of Serbia into the building, announcing the possible interior reconstruction for late 2021. As it was left unkept, the interior had seriously deteriorated by June 2021. The plaster on the walls was peeled off, on some places uncovering the reed, which was used for plating at the time. The basement was flooded, the roof beams were covered in mold, and the parquet flooring dried and bent. Dušica Bojić, director of the Historical Museum of Serbia which took over the building on 19 November 2020, said that the situation in the building was very bad. All communal infrastructure had been ruptured, with wastewater flooding the basement. The power grid also collapsed, causing the exterior clock to stop working. All three exterior clocks (main entrance, side entrance, inner platform entrance) were then removed in August 2021, and their analog mechanisms were replaced with digital ones. The hands of the face clocks were replaced with lighter ones, while the GPS antenna and solar panels have been placed above the main entrance.

The Minister for Culture, Maja Gojković, announced in February 2022 that the reconstruction of the building would start in July 2022, and would be finished in November 2023. By July 2022, the inner yard where the former platforms were, was littered with garbage, resembling a dump. Derelict, partially flooded, and covered in overgrowth and waste, former station was labeled the Belgrade's "greatest abomination and shame". The garbage continued to pile up, including in the building itself. The smell became unbearable as dead animals were also left at the dump, too. Both the new museum administration and the Ministry of Culture claim to have pleaded with the government for months to solve the problem, but to no avail. In September 2022, city communal services cleaned the inside of the building and the area adjoining the building but left the piles of garbage on the former platforms and tracks, claiming it is on the land of Belgrade Waterfront. The authorities blamed homeless people and migrants for creating the dump. The Belgrade Waterfront company started to remove the garbage in October 2022.

Only a smaller quantity of the garbage was removed, leaving large piles. By November 2022, the interior was damaged by fires, presumably lit by the homeless and migrants, as the building is basically left to the elements. At this time, it was announced that the funding for the reconstruction was secured.

== Criticism of shut down ==
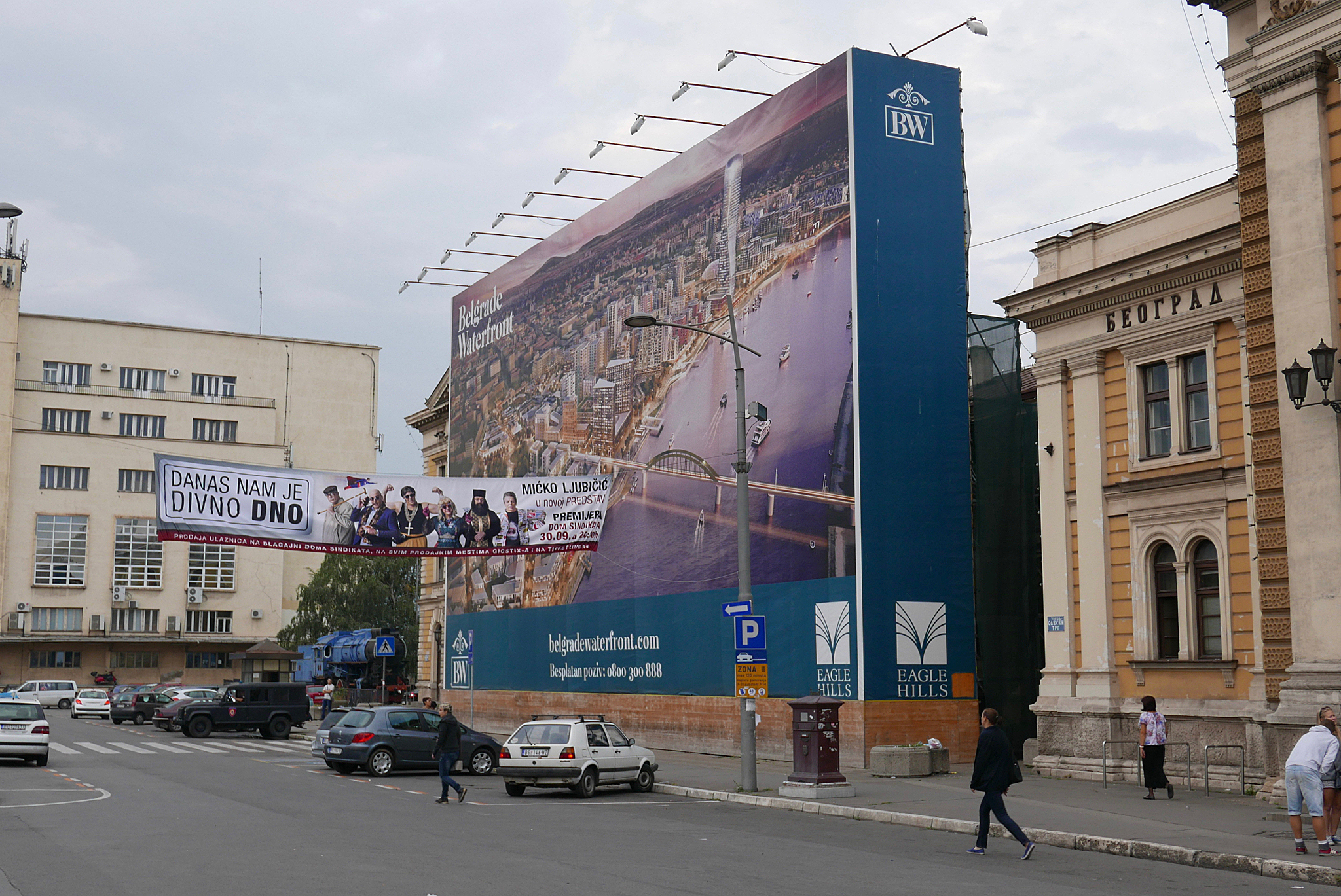
Belgrade Waterfront ad in front of the station

The complete removal of the railway traffic and the total shut down of the station, planned for 1 July 2018, has been met with the opposition from experts and the public, especially the notion that it has been hastily done because of the controversial Belgrade Waterfront project, while some openly doubt that the investors from the United Arab Emirates really asked for this to happen and that it is all part of a "special story". As of June 2018, it was estimated that in the best case scenario Prokop would become a fully functional station, with all necessary and supporting services, only by 2021.

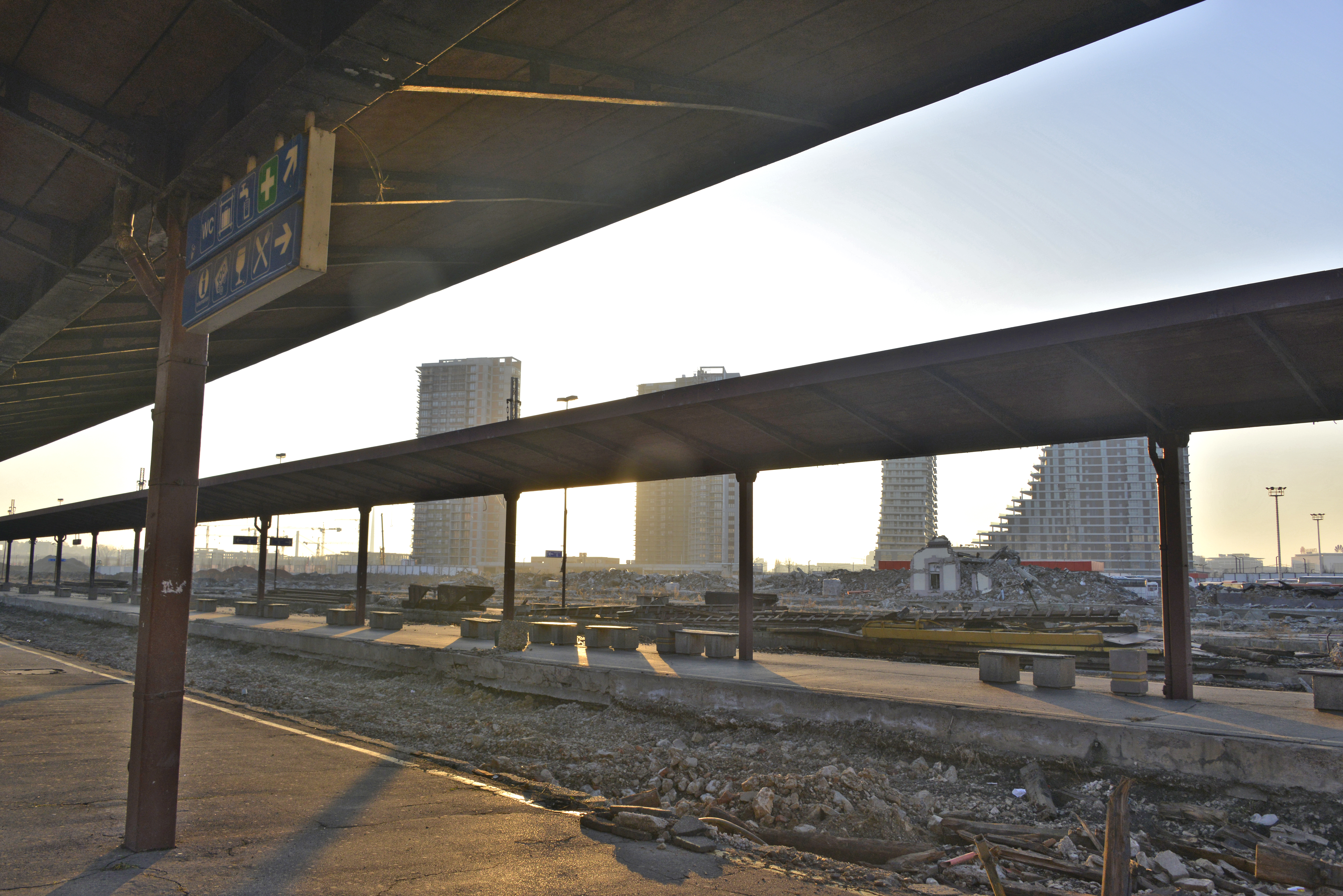
Demolition of the platforms underway by 17 February 2019

Member of the Serbian Academy of Sciences and Arts and public transportation expert Vukan Vučić described the closing of the station and its transfer to Prokop as the "most disastrous error of the Belgrade transportation". Citing numerous disadvantages of the new station, he asserted that the old, Main station is better suited for the railway traffic and that it should be kept. Main station is interconnected through the public transportation lines with almost all parts of Belgrade, and only 6 tram lines go to 11 parts of the city. The location is much better and, as Belgrade grew around it, most urban life unfolds around it. He disputed the claim of the city administration that the railway prevents the city from being able to "come out on the river banks" as the removal only of the tracks which are not in use will do the trick. The station will be of major importance for the future Belgrade Metro and that Prokop in functional terms is not a station at all; with the closing of the Main station, central Belgrade would not have a proper railway station. Vučić concluded that the interests of investors take precedence over those of commuters. He also maintains that the isolation of the new station's location will cause a further decrease in the number of railway passengers. Another member of the Academy, transportation engineer Dušan Teodorović, also criticized the project.

Nenad Kecman, executive manager of the Serbian Railways, stated that none of the objections or suggestions by experts from the railway transportation branch were adopted by the city administration. The new system will marginalize railway transportation, he added, claiming that the professionals are against both the closing of the station, as the entire city gravitates to it, and the planned demolition or adaptation into a pedestrian bridge of the Old Railway Bridge. Saying that such a luxurious complex like the planned Belgrade Waterfront cannot function without some kind of a railway system, especially for connecting it to the airport, the experts insisted on keeping the old station in at least a diminished capacity, but the city refused that, claiming that the investors from the United Arab Emirates, who are partners in the Belgrade Waterfront project, rejected any idea of a railway.

Architect Bojan Kovačević, president of the Academy of Architecture of Serbia, labeled the hastiness in pushing the Belgrade Waterfront agenda - like the closing of the Main Railway Station even though the new railway facilities weren't finished - as the "raping" of Belgrade. Smaller protests against the shut down were organized in the final period, including the day of the closing.

== Architecture and protection ==
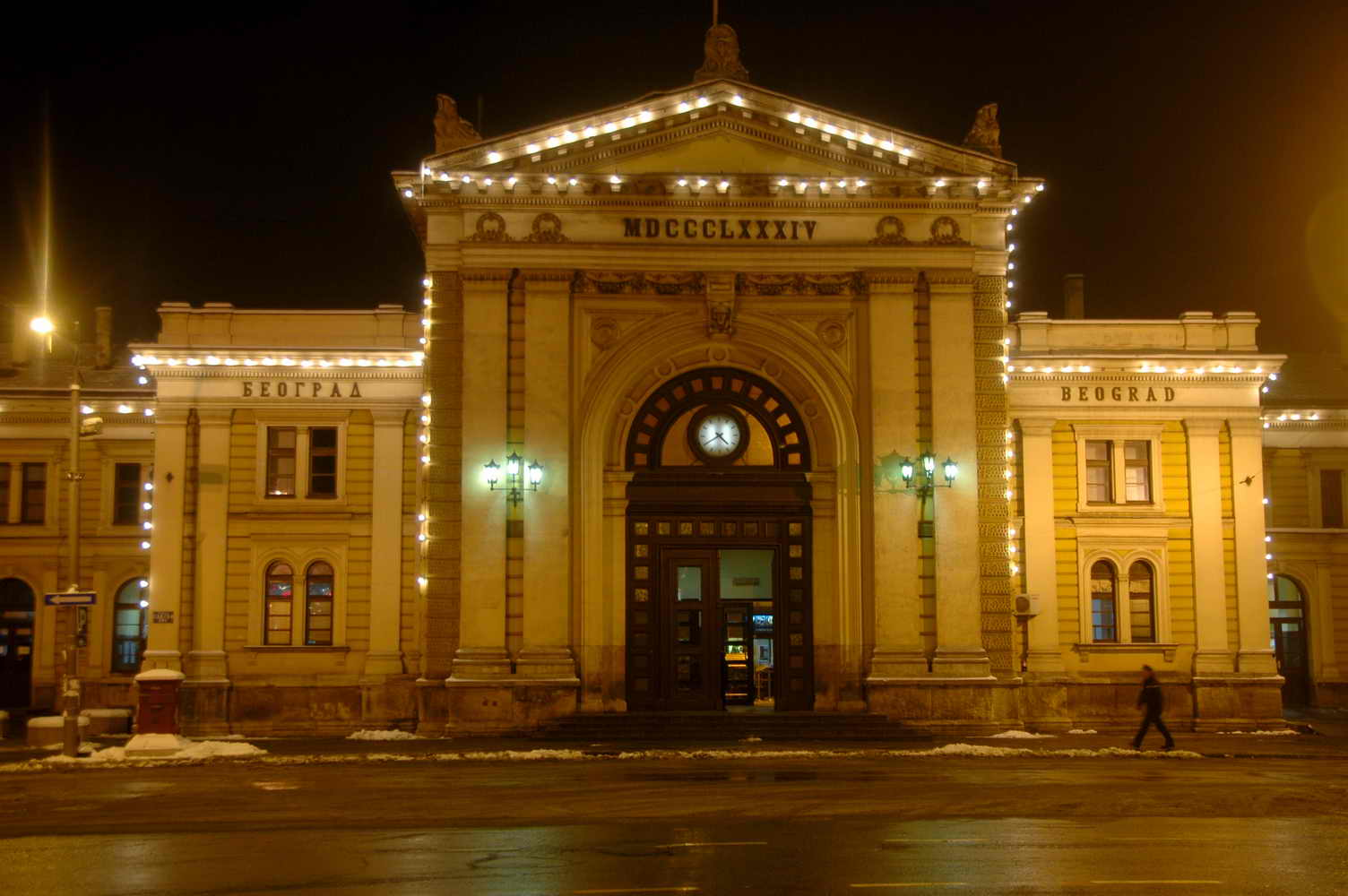
Main entrance by night

The building is constructed in the fashion of railway stations of major European countries and is a monumental edifice. The project was drafted by the Austrian architect Wilhelm von Flattich, while the definite elaboration of the project was done by Dragiša Milutinović. The contractors were the companies of Neischloss and Freind.

At the time of the construction, the building represented one of the most monumental buildings and the symbols of royal capital of the time. It is one of the first railway stations in Serbia, whose design included a specific architectural program and contents adapted to European technical achievements. It is designed in the style of academism, as a representative edifice, with a dynamic floor plan. The central classicist projection of the main entrance with the triangular tympanum dominates over the architectural composition. With its specific solutions, the building stands as proof of the technical and architectural development of Serbia in the last decades of the 19th century.

On 10 April 1984, a Tito's Blue Train steam locomotive (1947-1978) was put on open display next to the railway station entrance. It was produced in 1947 in the "MÁVAG" factory in Budapest and was declared a memorial under the administration of the Railway Museum as the only one of its kind in Serbia. With all the changes regarding the station building and the Sava Square, in February 2022 it was announced that it will be relocated behind the building, on the track No. 1. By October 2023 the locomotive was not removed and was left to the elements, deteriorating a lot.

The building was declared a cultural monument in 1981, and a cultural monument of great importance in 1983.

== See also ==
- Belgrade railway junction
