= Chavannes =

Chavannes may refer to:

== In France ==
- Chavannes, Cher, in the Cher department
- Chavannes, Drôme, in the Drôme department
- Chavannes-les-Grands, in the Territoire de Belfort department
- Chavannes-sur-l'Étang, in the Haut-Rhin department
- Chavannes-sur-Reyssouze, in the Ain department
- Chavannes-sur-Suran, in the Ain department

== In Switzerland ==
- Chavannes-de-Bogis, in the canton of Vaud
- Chavannes-des-Bois, in the canton of Vaud
- Chavannes-le-Chêne, in the canton of Vaud
- Chavannes-les-Forts, in the municipality of Siviriez, canton of Fribourg
- Chavannes-le-Veyron, in the canton of Vaud
- Chavannes-près-Renens, in the canton of Vaud
- Chavannes-sous-Orsonnens, in the municipality of Villorsonnens, canton of Fribourg
- Chavannes-sur-Moudon, in the canton of Vaud
- Chavannes, Berne, in the municipality of La Neuveville, canton of Berne

== Surname ==
- Chavannes family, a family from Vaud, Switzerland
- Alexandre César Chavannes (1731–1800), Swiss theologian
- Celina Caesar-Chavannes, Canadian politician
- Cornélie Chavannes (1794–1874), Swiss educator
- Daniel-Alexandre Chavannes (1765–1846), Swiss pastor and zoologist
- Édouard Chavannes, French sinologist
- Édouard-Louis Chavannes (1805–1861), Swiss botanist
- Ernest Chavannes (1821–1895), Swiss pastor and bookseller
- Félix Chavannes (1802–1863), Swiss pastor and writer
- Fernand Henri Chavannes (1897-1985), French World War I flying ace
- Frédéric Chavannes (1803–1893), Swiss pastor and writer
- Jean-Baptiste Chavannes, Haitian revolutionary
- Jean-Baptiste Chavannes (agronomist), Haitian agronomist
- Jules Chavannes (1805–1874), Swiss pastor and writer
- Marc Chavannes, Dutch professor for journalism
- Marguerite Duvillard-Chavannes (1851–1925), Swiss women's movement activist
- Charles de Chavannes, French colonial administrator and author
- Pierre Puvis de Chavannes, French artist

== See also ==
- Chavanne, Haute-Saône, France
- La Chavanne, Savoie, France
