= Orestias =

Ancient Greek settlement in Turkey

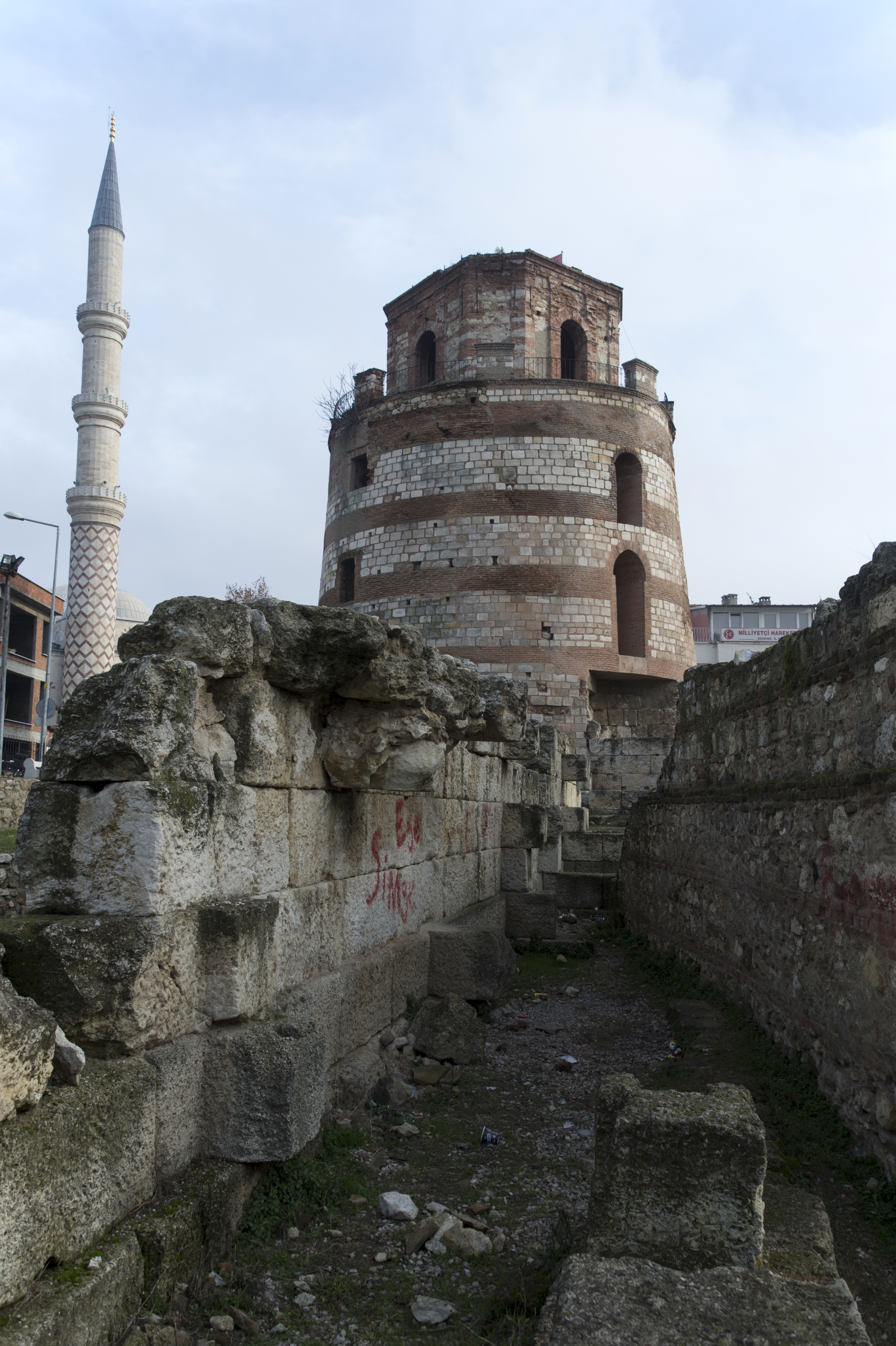
The remains of Roman and Byzantine fortifications next to the Macedonian tower.

Orestias (Greek: Ὀρεστιάς), later refounded by Hadrian as Adrianople (Greek: Άδριανούπολις), was an ancient Greek settlement next to the Evros river in Thrace, near or at the site of present-day Edirne, and close to the current border between Turkey and Greece.

== Foundation by Orestes and history ==
Legends claim that Orestias was founded by Orestes, the son of Agamemnon and Clytemnestra. Orestias or Orestia is thought to have been the same town as Uscudama (other variants: Uskudama, Uskadama, Uskodama) or Odrysa (other variants: Odrysia, Odrysos, Odrysus) which was the first Odrysian capital.

Orestias took its name by the Greeks, at least from the time Philip II of Macedon took over the town. The Roman emperor Hadrian expanded the town into a city, gave it a strong fortification and renamed it to Hadrianopolis (Greek: Άδριανούπολις). However the name Orestias was still used by many writers at the Byzantine era, along with Adrianoupolis. It was the capital of the Byzantine theme of Macedonia. During the Ottoman period the name of Adrianou(polis) was paraphrased by the Turks and eventually became Edirne.

In 1920 when the Greeks took over most of Eastern Thrace including Edirne, they restored the city's Roman name (Adrianoupolis) and not its old Greek name (Orestias), which was given to its suburb Karaağaç, in remembrance of the ancient Thracian town.

Orestiada (or Nea Orestias or New Orestias) is a modern Greek town founded in 1923 on a site 17 km (11 mi) to the south of Orestias, to house Greek refugees who had to abandon the latter border town, which was given to Turkey (along with two villages) by the Treaty of Lausanne.

== See also ==
- List of ancient Greek cities
