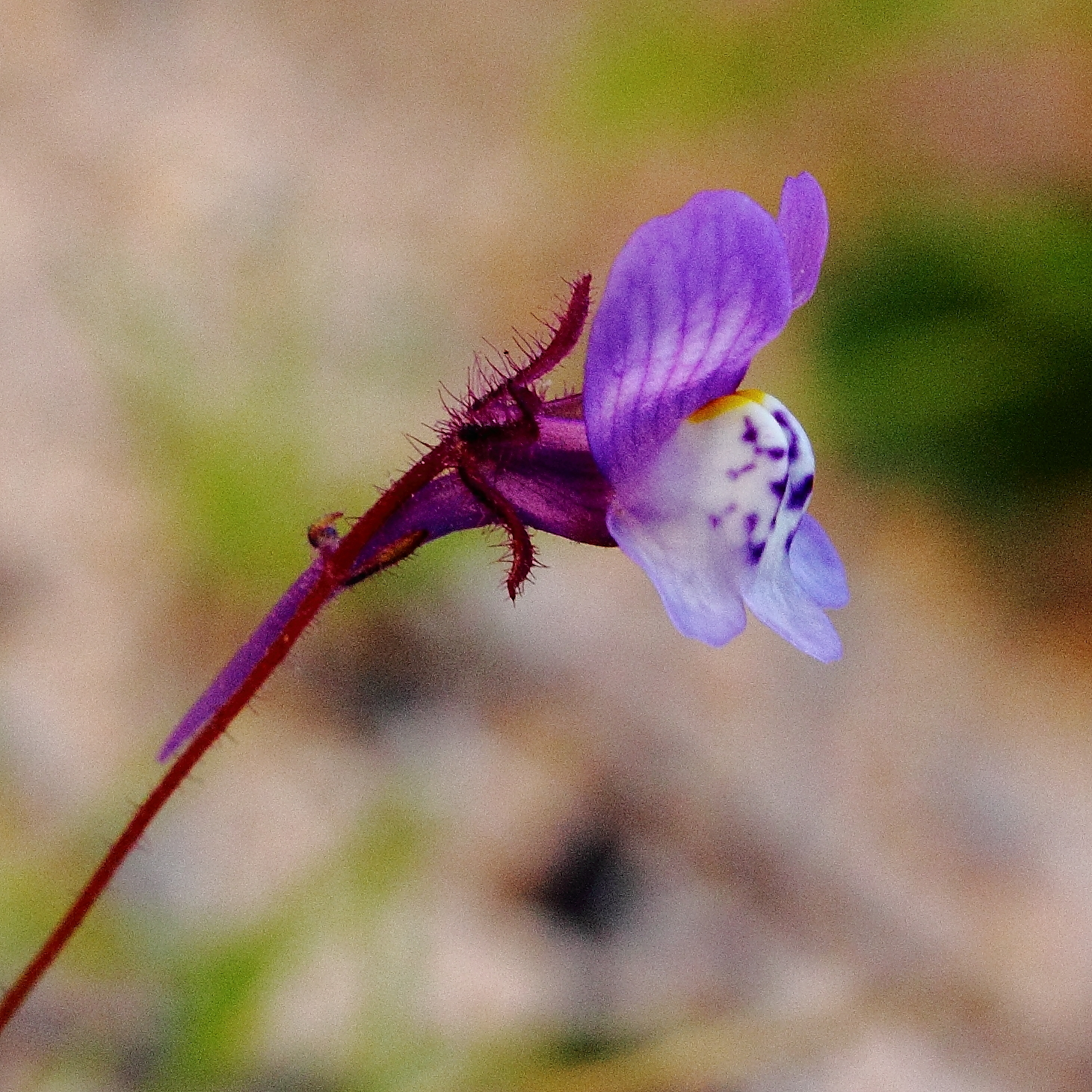

Conservation status
- Near Threatened (IUCN 3.1)

Scientific classification
- Kingdom: Plantae
- Clade: Embryophytes
- Clade: Tracheophytes
- Clade: Spermatophytes
- Clade: Angiosperms
- Clade: Eudicots
- Clade: Asterids
- Order: Lamiales
- Family: Plantaginaceae
- Genus: Linaria
- Species: L. algarviana

Binomial name
- Linaria algarviana Chav.

Synonyms
- Linaria spartea var. violacea Lange; Linaria salzmannii var. violacea Bourg. ex Lange

= Linaria algarviana =

Species of toadflax endemic to southern Portugal

Linaria algarviana, commonly known as the Algarve toadflax (Portuguese: pombinhas-do-Algarve), is a species of flowering plant in the family Plantaginaceae, endemic to the Algarve region of southern Portugal. It was first described by the Swiss botanist Édouard-Louis Chavannes in 1833.

== Description ==
Linaria algarviana is an annual herb reaching heights of 14–25 centimetres (6–10 in). It typically produces 1–15 stems, which are usually simple or slightly branched. The leaves are glaucous and fleshy; lower leaves are arranged in whorls, while the upper leaves are alternate and oblong-lanceolate in shape.

The inflorescence is a loose raceme of 1–8 flowers. The corolla is 16–25 mm long and distinctly violet, featuring a yellow or beige palate (the "lower lip" bulge) marked with violet veins and spots. The nectar spur is relatively long and straight or slightly curved.

The species is very similar to Linaria amethystea, differing in the looser, less stiffly erect stems, and in the finely ridged seeds lacking a wing.

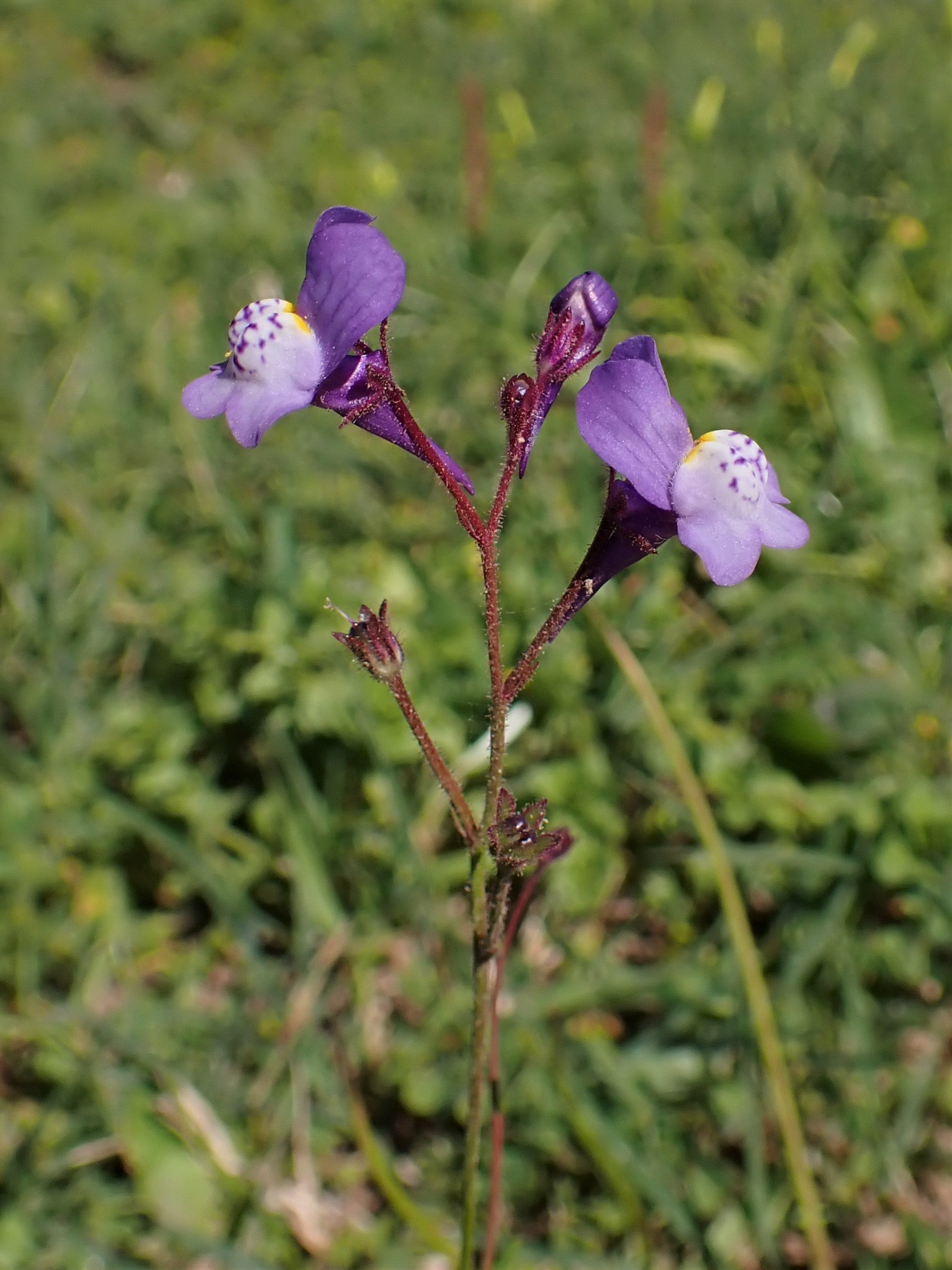
Linaria algarviana at Lagoa dos Salgados

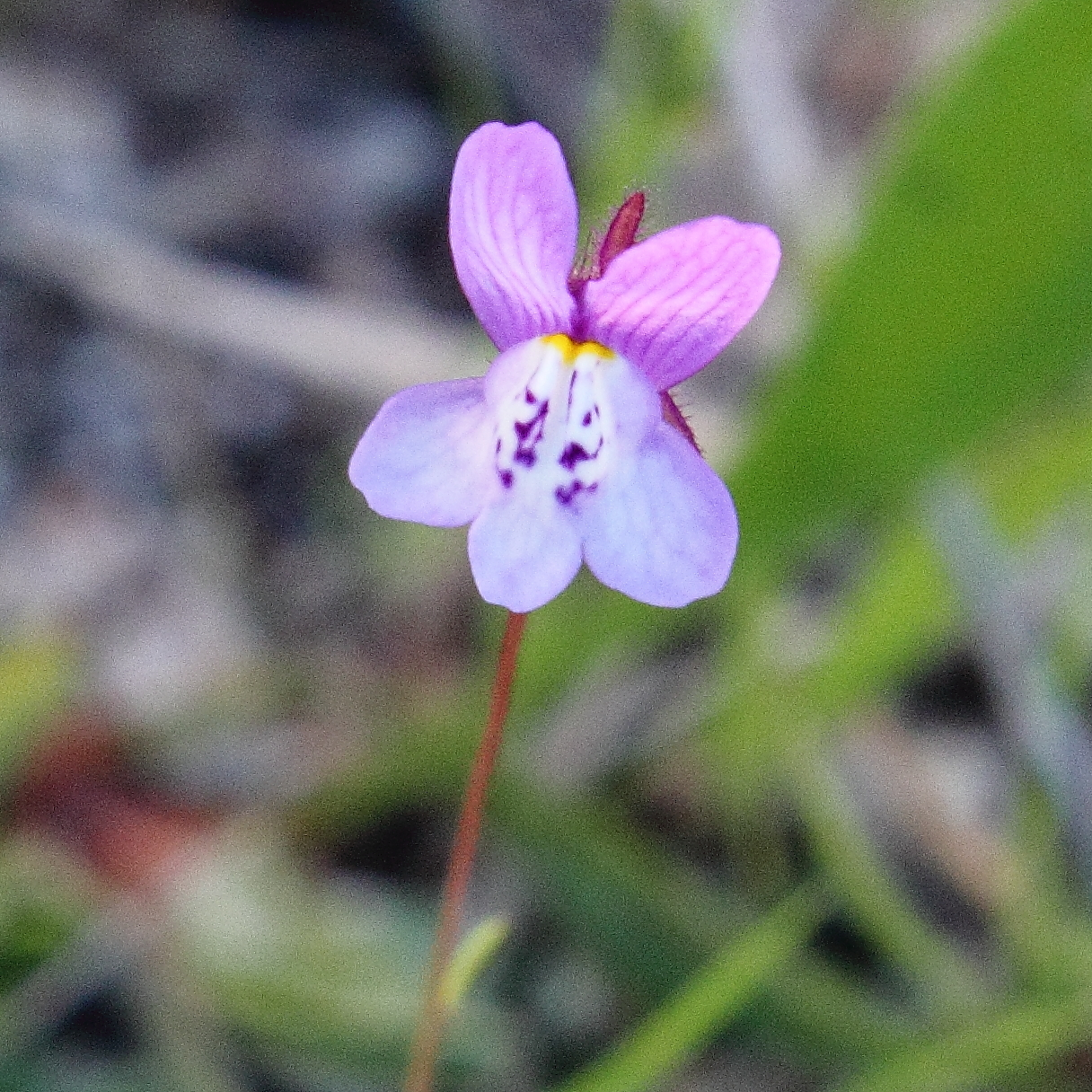
Linaria algarviana corolla

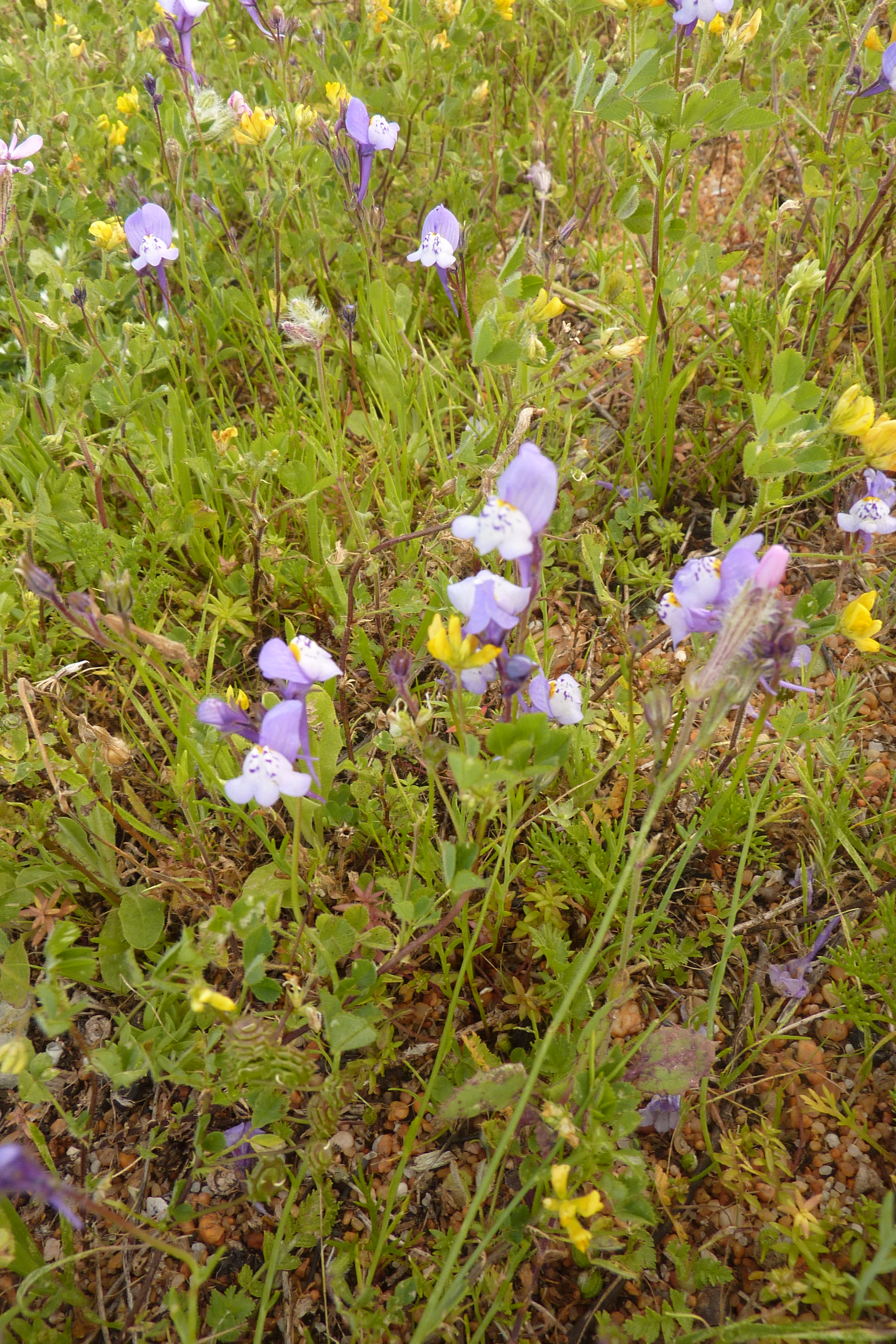
Linaria algarviana (Pombinhas) in Lagos

=== Leaves ===
The leaves are somewhat fleshy in consistency. The lower leaves are arranged in whorls of three or four and are oblong-lanceolate. The upper leaves are alternate, linear-lanceolate, and measure approximately 5–15 mm in length and 1–3 mm in width.

=== Flowers ===
The inflorescence is a raceme that is initially dense but becomes lax as it elongates. The flowers are distinctly zygomorphic.

- Corolla: The corolla is 17–25 mm long and predominantly violet. It features a prominent pale yellow spot at the throat grading to a creamy-white to pinkish-white palate (the bulge at the throat) that is strikingly marked with dark violet veins and spots.
- Spur: The nectar spur is 9–13 mm long, slender, and usually straight or only slightly curved.

Floral formula:

$$X \text{ or } * K_{(5)}, [C_{(5)}, A_{4}], G_{\underline{(2)}}, \text{capsule}$$

=== Fruit and seeds ===
The fruit is a subglobose capsule measuring 4–6 mm, which opens via apical pores (porocidal). The seeds are small (0.5–0.8 mm), black, and lack the membranous wing found in some other Linaria species; instead, they are covered in fine longitudinal ridges or crests.

== Phenology ==
Linaria algarviana typically flowers from February to May, with the peak flowering period occurring in March and April. Seed dispersal occurs shortly after the capsules mature in late spring.

== Distribution and habitat ==
This species is native and restricted to the western Algarve (the Barlavento), primarily between Lagos and the Sagres peninsula. It inhabits clearings of xerophilic scrubland, coastal pastures, and sandy meadows. It is occasionally found in open pine forests and vineyards, almost exclusively on shale or sandy substrates near the coastline.

== Conservation ==
Previously considered by the IUCN Red List as a species of Least Concern, it is currently evaluated as Near Threatened on the IUCN Red List. While it remains locally abundant in some areas, its restricted range makes it vulnerable to habitat loss from tourism development and agricultural intensification.

In Portugal, it is listed on the Red List of Vascular Flora of Mainland Portugal. It is a protected species under the European Union's Habitats Directive (Annexes II and IV) and the Berne Convention (Annex I).
