= Chevannes =

Chevannes is the name or part of the name of the following communes in France:

- Chevannes, Côte-d'Or, in the Côte-d'Or department
- Chevannes, Essonne, in the Essonne department
- Chevannes, Loiret, in the Loiret department
- Chevannes, Yonne, in the Yonne department
- Billy-Chevannes, in the Nièvre department
- Chevannes-Changy, in the Nièvre department
- see also Chavannes
