= Jules Chavannes =

Swiss pastor and writer (1805–1874)

- Born: 12 October 1805; Vevey, Switzerland
- Died: 1 May 1874 (aged 68); Vevey, Switzerland
- Occupations: Pastor; writer
- Spouse: Marianne-Françoise Duvillard (m. 1832)
- Parents: Etienne Chavannes (father); Julie Comte (mother)

Jules Chavannes (12 October 1805 – 1 May 1874) was a Swiss pastor and writer from the Chavannes family. He resigned from the ministry in 1845 and was from then on one of the driving forces of the Free Church (Église libre) and its faculty. He published several studies on the history of Protestantism.

== Biography ==
Jules Chavannes was born in Vevey, the son of Etienne, a pastor, and Julie Comte. He was a nephew of Daniel-Alexandre Chavannes. In 1832 he married Marianne-Françoise (Ninette) Duvillard, daughter of François Louis Duvillard and Albertine Marianne Bugnion.

After studying theology in Lausanne, Chavannes was ordained in 1829. He was assistant pastor (suffragant) in Corsier from 1829 to 1838 and in Vevey from 1839 to 1841, then pastor in Mollens from 1841 to 1844 and in Colombier from 1844. He resigned from the ministry in 1845 and retired to the area around Vevey. From then on he was one of the driving forces of the Free Church and its faculty.

Chavannes contributed to several journals, among them the Bibliothèque universelle and the Revue chrétienne. He published several studies on the history of Protestantism, including a work on the Huguenot religious refugees (the Refuge).

== Bibliography ==
- E. Chavannes, Notes sur la famille Chavannes, [1882]
