= Jules Duvillard =

Swiss foundry owner and politician

- Born: 29 July 1835; Coppet, Switzerland
- Died: 11 May 1914 (aged 78); Lausanne, Switzerland
- Occupations: Foundry owner; politician
- Spouse: Marguerite Duvillard-Chavannes (m. 1874)
- Father: Louis François Duvillard

Jules Duvillard (29 July 1835 – 11 May 1914) was a Swiss foundry owner and politician. In 1863 he bought the Fonderie du Vallon in Lausanne, and from 1878 to 1897 he was a liberal member of the Grand Council of Vaud.

== Biography ==
Jules Duvillard was born in Coppet, the son of Louis François Duvillard. He attended the Collège Galliard in 1850–1851 and a school of mechanics, and then trained with André Koechlin & Cie in Mulhouse. In 1874 he married Marguerite Chavannes.

In 1863 Duvillard bought the Fonderie du Vallon in Lausanne, which made a wide range of products: agricultural machinery, threshing machines, saws, water wheels, wine presses and other presses, metal frameworks, hydrants and turbines. In 1913 he sold premises to the Société des tramways lausannois, which built a depot there. The foundry was bought by Adolphe Gisling the same year.

Duvillard was a liberal member of the Grand Council of Vaud from 1878 to 1897 and of the constituent assembly (Constituante) in 1884–1885.

== Bibliography ==
- J. Faucherre, Du Vallon à Moudon, 1963
- Encyclopédie illustrée du Pays de Vaud, 3, 132
