= Treaty of Lausanne =

1923 treaty between Turkey and the Allies of WWI

Treaty of Peace and Exchange of War Prisoners with Turkey Signed at Lausanne Accord relatif à la restitution réciproque des internés civils et à l'échange des prisonniers de guerre, signé à Lausanne Lozan'da Türkiye ile Barış ve Savaş Esirlerinin Değişimi üzerine İmzalanan Antlaşma
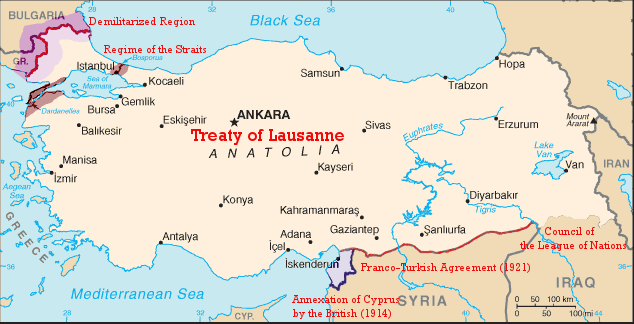
- Borders of Turkey set by the Treaty of Lausanne.
- Signed: July 24, 1923
- Location: Lausanne, Switzerland
- Effective: 6 August 1924
- Condition: Following ratification by Turkey and any three of the United Kingdom, France, Italy and Japan, the treaty would come into force for those "high contracting parties" and thereafter for each additional signatory upon deposit of ratification
- Parties: France; United Kingdom; Italy; Japan; Greece; Romania; Kingdom of Serbs, Croats and Slovenes; (Ottoman Empire) Turkey
- Depositary: French Republic
- Language: English and French

Full text
- Treaty of Lausanne at Wikisource

The Treaty of Lausanne (French: Traité de Lausanne; Turkish: Lozan Antlaşması) is a peace treaty negotiated during the Lausanne Conference of 1922–1923 and signed in the Palais de Rumine in Lausanne, Switzerland, on 24 July 1923. The treaty officially resolved the conflict that had initially arisen between the Ottoman Empire and the Allied French Republic, British Empire, Kingdom of Italy, Empire of Japan, Kingdom of Greece, Kingdom of Yugoslavia, and the Kingdom of Romania since the outset of World War I. The original text of the treaty is in English and French. It emerged as a second attempt at peace after the failed and unratified Treaty of Sèvres, which had sought to partition Ottoman territories. The earlier treaty, signed in 1920, was later rejected by the Turkish National Movement which actively opposed its terms. As a result of Greek defeat in the Greco-Turkish War, Turkish forces recaptured İzmir, and the Armistice of Mudanya was signed in October 1922. This armistice provided for the exchange of Greek-Turkish populations and allowed unrestricted civilian, non-military passage through the Turkish Straits.

Turkey ratified the treaty on 23 August 1923, and all other signatories did so by 16 July 1924. The Treaty of Lausanne became effective on 6 August 1924.

Additionally, a declaration of amnesty was issued, granting immunity for crimes committed between 1914 and 1922, including the Armenian genocide and Greek genocide.

== Background ==
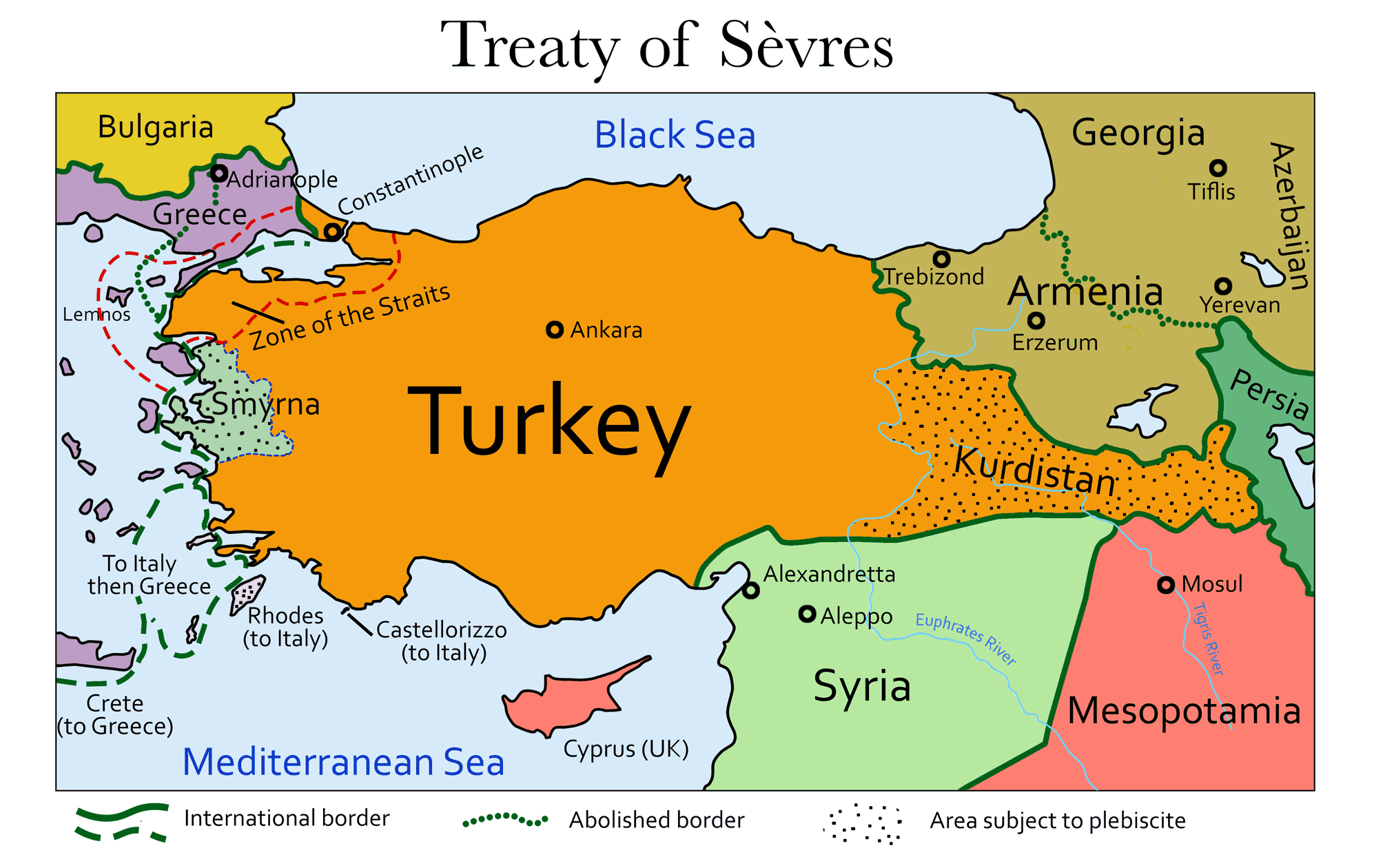
Borders of Turkey according to the unratified Treaty of Sèvres (1920) which was annulled and replaced by the Treaty of Lausanne (1923) in the aftermath of the Turkish War of Independence

After the withdrawal of the Greek forces in Asia Minor and the expulsion of the Ottoman Sultan by the Turkish army under the command of Mustafa Kemal Atatürk, the Ankara-based Kemalist government of the Turkish National Movement rejected the territorial losses imposed by the 1920 Treaty of Sèvres, previously signed by the Ottoman Empire but remaining unratified. Britain had sought to undermine Turkish influence in Mesopotamia and Kirkuk by seeking the creation of a Kurdish state in Eastern Anatolia. Secular Kemalist rhetoric relieved some of the international concerns about the future of Armenians who had survived the 1915 Armenian genocide, and support for Kurdish self determination similarly declined. Under the Treaty of Lausanne, signed in 1923, Eastern Anatolia became part of modern-day Turkey, in exchange for Turkey's relinquishing Ottoman-era claims to the oil-rich Arab lands.

Negotiations were undertaken during the Conference of Lausanne. İsmet İnönü was the chief negotiator for Turkey. Lord Curzon, the British Foreign Secretary of that time, was the chief negotiator for the Allies, while Eleftherios Venizelos negotiated on behalf of Greece. The negotiations took many months. On 20 November 1922, the peace conference was opened; the treaty was signed on 24 July 1923 after eight months of arduous negotiation, punctuated by several Turkish withdrawals. The Allied delegation included U.S. Admiral Mark L. Bristol, who served as the United States High Commissioner and supported Turkish efforts.

== Stipulations ==
The treaty was composed of 143 articles with major sections including:

Treaty
Parts
Convention on the Turkish Straits
Trade (abolition of capitulations) – Article 28 provided: "Each of the High Contracting Parties hereby accepts, in so far as it is concerned, the complete abolition of the Capitulations in Turkey in every respect."
Agreements
Binding letters

The treaty provided for the independence of the Republic of Turkey but also for the protection of the Greek Orthodox Christian minority in Turkey and the Muslim minority in Greece. However, most of the Christian population of Turkey and the Muslim population of Greece had already been deported under the earlier Convention Concerning the Exchange of Greek and Turkish Populations signed by Greece and Turkey. Only the Greek Orthodox population of Constantinople, Imbros and Tenedos (about 270,000 at that time), and the Muslim population of Western Thrace (about 129,120 in 1923) were excluded. Article 14 of the treaty granted the islands of Imbros (Gökçeada) and Tenedos (Bozcaada) "special administrative organisation", a right that was revoked by the Turkish government on 17 February 1926. Turkey also formally accepted the loss of Cyprus (which had been leased to the British Empire following the Congress of Berlin in 1878, but de jure remained an Ottoman territory until World War I). The fate of the province of Mosul was left to be determined through the League of Nations. Turkey also explicitly renounced all claims to the Dodecanese Islands, which Italy had been obliged to return to Turkey according to Article 2 of the Treaty of Ouchy in 1912 following the Italo-Turkish War (1911–1912).

=== Summary of contents of treaty ===
Lausanne Treaty I. Treaty of Peace
Parts	Sections
	Preamble
Part I	Political Clauses
Part II	Financial Clauses
Part III.	Economic clauses
Part IV	Communications and Sanitary Questions
Part V.	Miscellaneous Provisions
Part IV.	Convention respecting conditions of Residence and Business and Jurisdiction
Part V	Commercial Convention
Part VI	Convention concerning the Exchange of Greek and Turkish Populations
Part VII	Agreement between Greece and Turkey respecting the reciprocal restitution of interned civilians and the exchange of prisoners of war
Part VIII	Declaration relating to the Amnesty
Part IX	Declaration relating to Muslim properties in Greece
Part X	Declaration relating to sanitary matters in Turkey;
Part XI	Declaration relating to the administration of justice;
Part XII	Protocol relation to certain concessions granted
Part XIII	Protocol relating to the accession of Belgium and Portugal to contain provisions and instruments signed at Lausanne
Part XIV	Protocol relating to the evacuation of the Turkish territory occupied by the British, French and Italian forces
Part XV	Protocol relative to the Karagatch territory and the Islands of Imbros and Tenedos
Part XVI	Protocol relative to the Treaty concluded at Sèvres between the principal Allied Powers and Greece on 10 August 1920, concerning the protection of minorities in Greece, and the Treaty concluded on the same day between the same Powers relating to Thrace.
Part XVII	Protocol relating to signature by the Serb-Croat-Slovene State

=== Borders ===
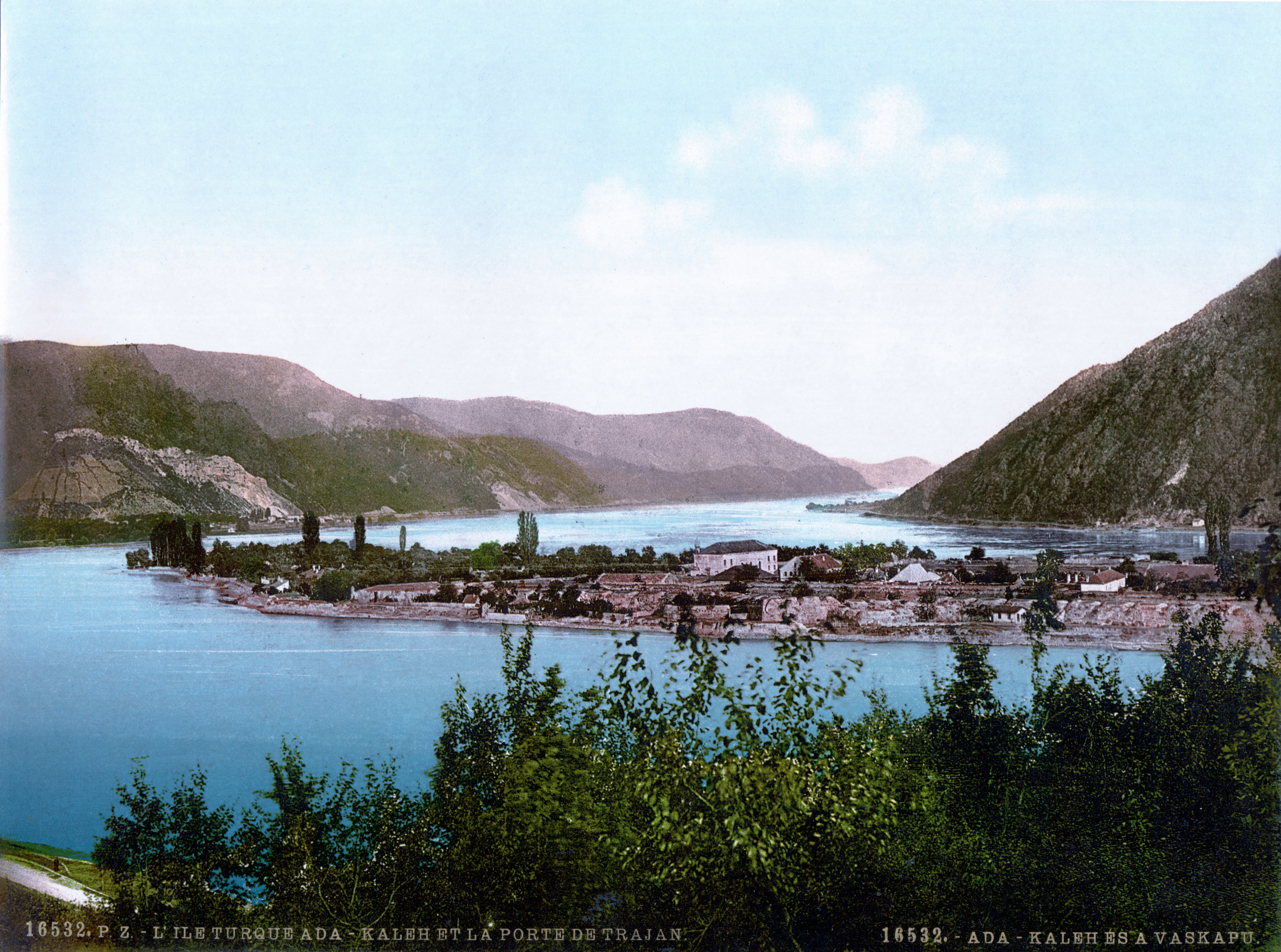
Adakale Island in River Danube was forgotten during the peace talks at the Congress of Berlin in 1878, which allowed it to remain a de jure Ottoman territory and the Ottoman Sultan Abdülhamid II's private possession until the Treaty of Lausanne in 1923 (de facto until Romania unilaterally declared its sovereignty on the island in 1919 and further strengthened this claim with the Treaty of Trianon in 1920). The island was submerged during the construction of the Iron Gates hydroelectric plant in 1970, which also removed the possibility of a potential legal claim by the descendants of Abdul Hamid II.

The treaty delimited the boundaries of Greece, Bulgaria, and Turkey. Specifically, the treaty provisioned that all the islands, islets and other territories in the Aegean Sea (Eastern Mediterranean in the original text) beyond three miles from the Turkish shores were ceded to Greece, with the exception of Imbros, Tenedos and Rabbit islands (Articles 6 and 12). There is a special notation in both articles, that, unless it is explicitly stated otherwise, the Turkish sovereignty extends three miles from Asia Minor shores. The Greek population of Imbros and Tenedos was not included in the population exchange and would be protected under the stipulations of the protection of the minorities in Turkey (Article 38).

The major issue of the war reparations, demanded from Greece by Turkey, was abandoned after Greece agreed to cede Karaağaç to Turkey.

Turkey also formally ceded all claims on the Dodecanese Islands (Article 15); Cyprus (Article 20); Egypt and Sudan (Article 17); Syria and Iraq (Article 3); and (along with the Treaty of Ankara) settled the boundaries of the latter two nations.

The territories to the south of Syria and Iraq on the Arabian Peninsula, which still remained under Turkish control when the Armistice of Mudros was signed on 30 October 1918, were not explicitly identified in the text of the treaty. However, the definition of Turkey's southern border in Article 3 also meant that Turkey officially ceded them. These territories included the Mutawakkilite Kingdom of Yemen, Asir and parts of Hejaz like the city of Medina. They were held by Turkish forces until 23 January 1919.

By Articles 25 and 26 of the Treaty of Lausanne, Turkey officially ceded Adakale Island in the Danube River to Romania by formally recognizing the related provisions in the Treaty of Trianon of 1920. Due to a diplomatic irregularity at the 1878 Congress of Berlin, the island had technically remained part of the Ottoman Empire.

Turkey also renounced its privileges in Libya which were defined by Article 10 of the Treaty of Ouchy in 1912 (per Article 22 of the Treaty of Lausanne in 1923.)

=== Agreements ===
Among many agreements, there was a separate agreement with the United States, the Chester concession. In the United States, the treaty was opposed by several groups, including the Committee Opposed to the Lausanne Treaty (COLT), and on 18 January 1927, the United States Senate refused to ratify the treaty by a vote of 50–34, six votes short of the two-thirds required by the Constitution. Consequently, Turkey annulled the concession.

Besides, Turkey was obliged to instate four European advisors on juridical matters for five years. The advisors were to observe a juridical reform in Turkey. The advisors contract could be renewed if the suggested reforms would not have taken place. Subsequently, Turkey worked on and announced a new Turkish constitution and reformed the Turkish justice system by including the Swiss Civil code, the Italian criminal law and the German Commercial law before completion of the five years in question.

== Declaration of Amnesty ==
Declaration of Amnesty

Annex VIII to the treaty, called "Declaration of Amnesty", granted legal immunity to any Turkish or Greek resident who between 1914 and 1922 committed acts "on account of any military or political action taken by him, or any assistance of any kind given by him to a foreign Power signatory of the treaty of peace." The treaty thus put an end to the effort to prosecute Ottoman war criminals for crimes such as the Armenian genocide, the Sayfo, the Greek genocide, and codified impunity for these crimes.

== Legacy ==
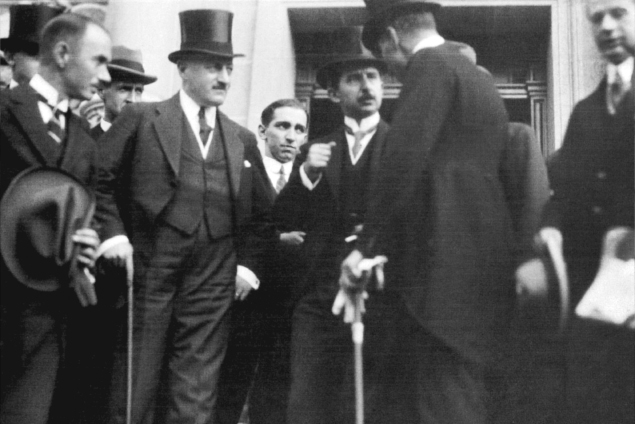
Turkish delegation after having signed the Treaty of Lausanne. The delegation was led by İsmet İnönü (in the middle).

The Treaty of Lausanne led to the international recognition of the sovereignty of the new Republic of Turkey as the successor state of the Ottoman Empire. As result of the Treaty, the Ottoman public debt was divided between Turkey and the countries which emerged from the former Ottoman Empire. The convention on the Straits lasted for thirteen years and was replaced with the Montreux Convention Regarding the Regime of the Straits in 1936. The customs limitations in the treaty were shortly after reworked.

For Greece, the treaty brought to an end the impetus behind the Megali Idea, the notion that modern Greece should encompass those territories in Asia Minor which had been populated with Greek speakers for up to 3000 years and which also formed the core of the Eastern Roman Empire.

Hatay Province remained a part of the French Mandate of Syria according to the Treaty of Lausanne, but in 1938 gained its independence as the Hatay State, which later joined Turkey after a referendum in 1939. Political amnesty was given to opponents of the new Turkish regime but the government reserved the right to make 150 exceptions (the 150 personae non gratae of Turkey). Among them were Mustafa Sabri, the penultimate Shaykh al-Islām of the Ottoman Empire and Ali Sami Bey, a former Ottoman naval officer who fought for the Greek Army during the war, among many others.

Lloyd George declared the treaty an "abject, cowardly and infamous surrender".

Historian Norman Naimark states, "The Lausanne Treaty served as a pivotal international precedent for transferring populations against their will throughout the twentieth century."

Historian Ronald Grigor Suny states that the treaty "essentially confirmed the effectiveness of deportations or even murderous ethnic cleansing as a potential solution to population problems".

Historian Hans-Lukas Kieser states, "Lausanne tacitly endorsed comprehensive policies of expulsion and extermination of hetero-ethnic and hetero-religious groups, with fatal attraction for German revisionists and many other nationalists".

== Conspiracy theories ==
The Treaty of Lausanne has given rise to a number of Islamist conspiracy theories in Turkey to defame the post-war Turkish secular nationalist rule of the country. For example, it has been claimed that the treaty was signed to be effective for a century and there are "secret articles" in the treaty regarding Turkey's mining of natural resources. One conspiracy theory that had following in the 2010s held that the treaty would expire in 2023 and Turkey would be allowed to mine boron and petroleum. This appears not to have happened.

== See also ==
- Aftermath of World War I
- Freedom of religion in Turkey
- Conspiracy theories in Turkey
- Greek refugees
- Greeks in Turkey
- Human rights in Turkey
- Karamanlides
- Minority Treaties
- Muslim minority of Greece
- Outline and timeline of the Greek genocide
- Population exchange between Greece and Turkey
- San Remo conference
- Treaty of Lausanne Monument and Museum in Karaağaç, Edirne, Turkey
- Turks of the Dodecanese
- Turks of Western Thrace
