= Palais de Rumine =

Historic building in Lausanne, Switzerland

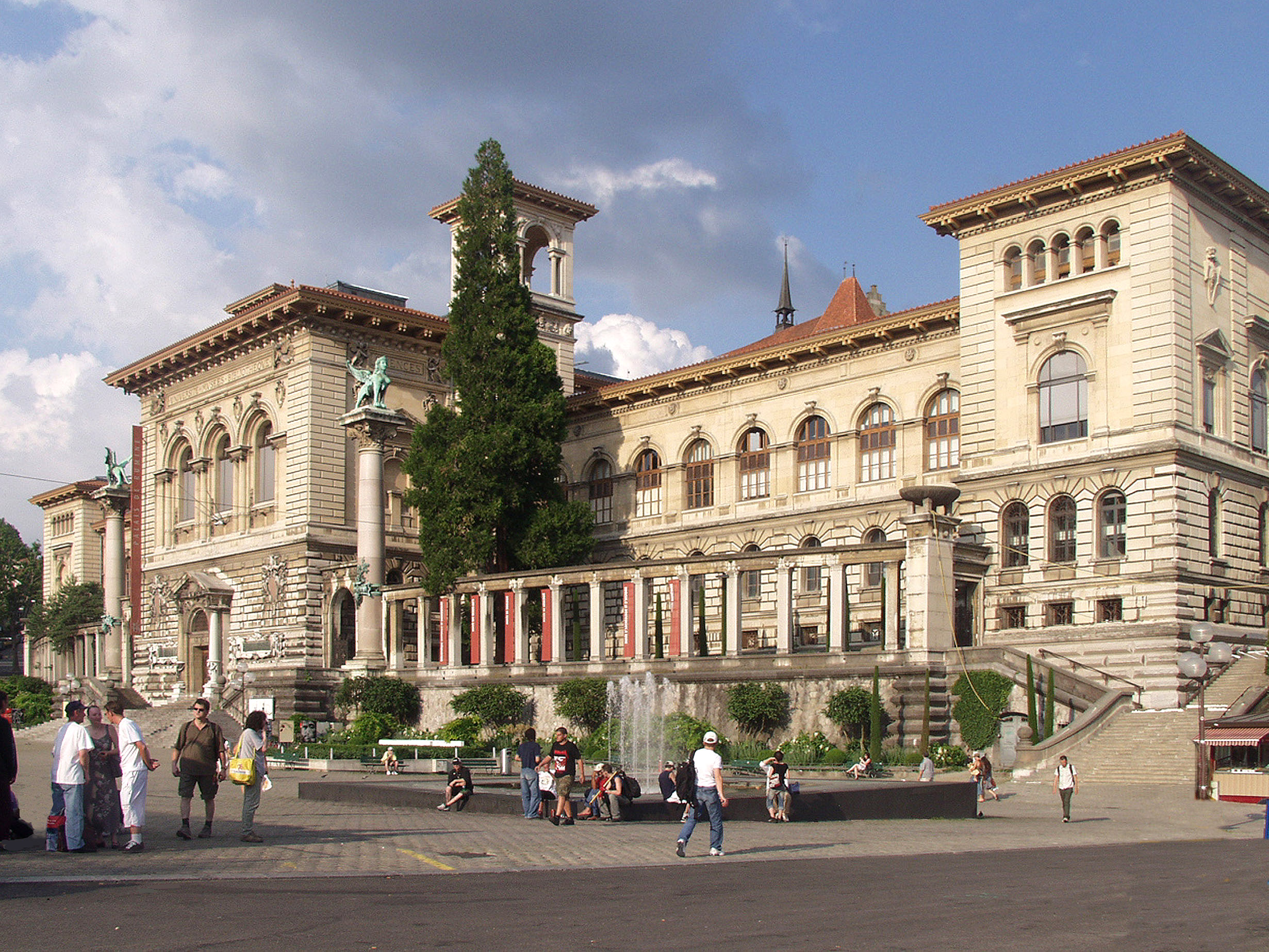
- Interactive map of the Palais de Rumine area

General information
- Architectural style: Florentine Renaissance
- Location: Lausanne, Switzerland
- Coordinates: 46°31′25″N 6°38′02″E
- Inaugurated: November 3, 1902

Design and construction
- Architect: Gaspard André

Website
- http://www.palaisderumine.ch/le-palais/accueil/

The Palais de Rumine (French pronunciation: [palɛ d(ə) ʁymin]) is a late 19th-century building in Florentine Renaissance style in Lausanne, Switzerland.

== History ==
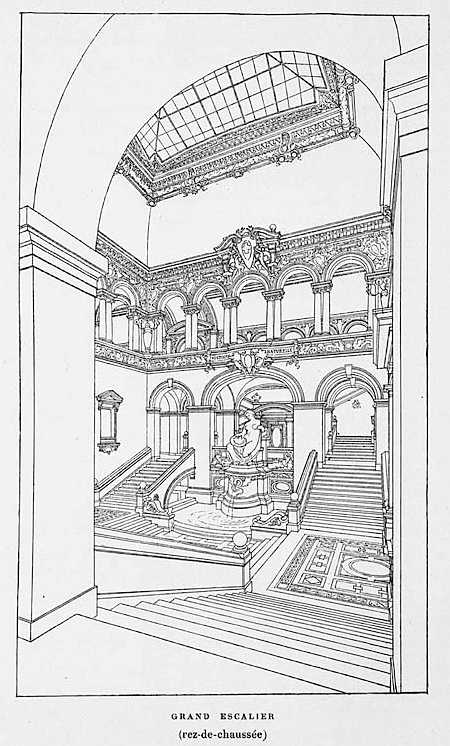
Perspective of the grand staircase, drawn by Gaspard André

On his death, Gabriel de Rumine, son of Russian nobility, left the city of Lausanne 1.5 million Swiss Francs to erect a building for the use of the public.

Building began in 1892 according to the design of the Lyonnais architect Gaspard André. The Palais was inaugurated on 3 November 1902, although building work continued until 1904.

On 24 July 1923, the Treaty of Lausanne was signed in Palais de Rumine.

It housed facilities such as the library of the University of Lausanne, and scientific and artistic collections belonging to the Canton of Vaud. In the 1980s, the university moved to its current location by Lake Geneva due to lack of space, and the Palais was restructured.

== Current use ==
The building currently hosts one of the three sites of the Cantonal and University Library of Lausanne. Additionally, it contains the following museums:

- Musée cantonal des beaux-arts (Cantonal Museum of Fine Arts)
- Musée cantonal d'archéologie et d'histoire (Cantonal Museum of Archeology and History)
- Musée monétaire cantonal (Cantonal Museum of Money)
- Musée cantonal de géologie (Cantonal Museum of Geology)
- Musée cantonal de zoologie (Cantonal Museum of Zoology)

== Gallery ==
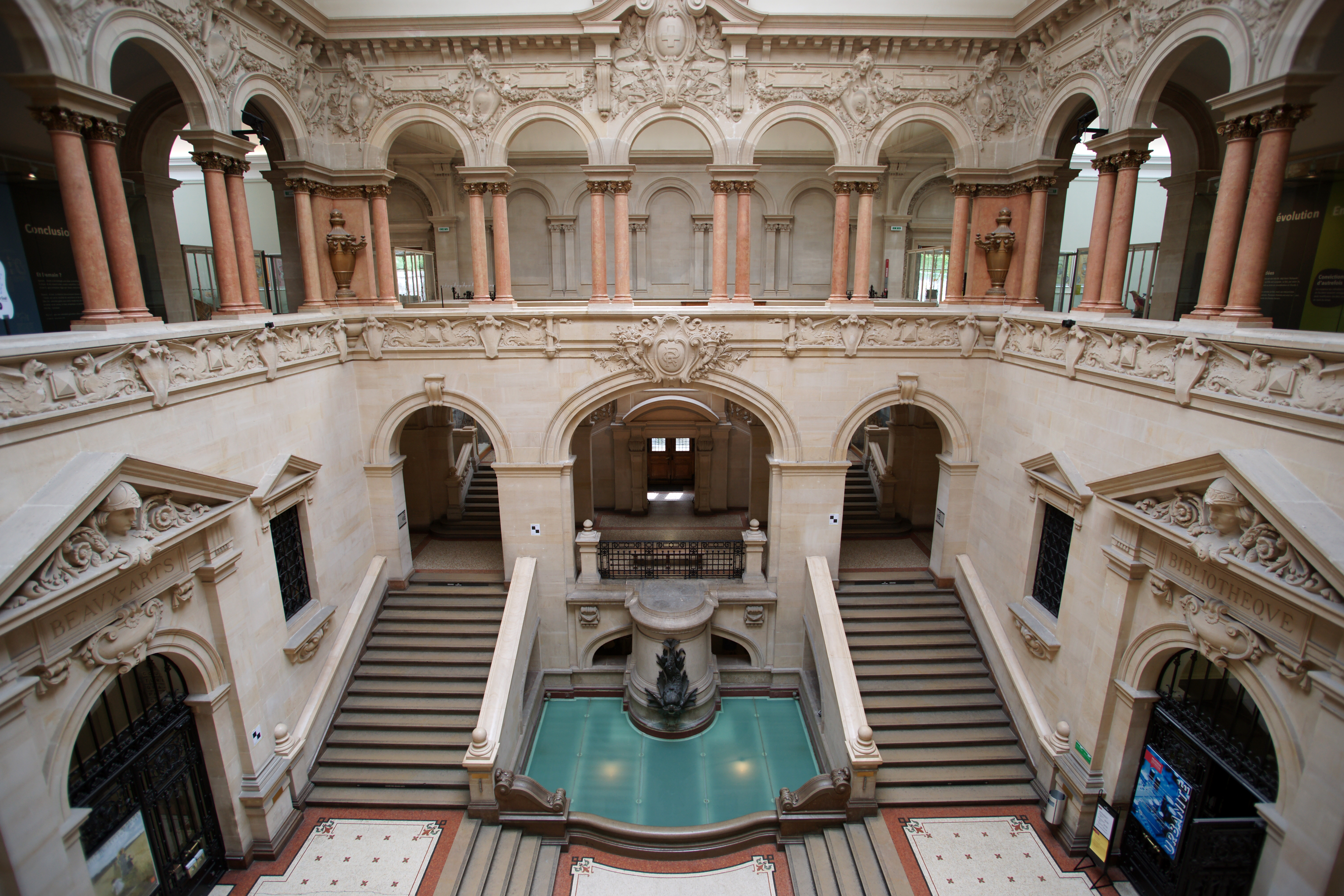
The main hall

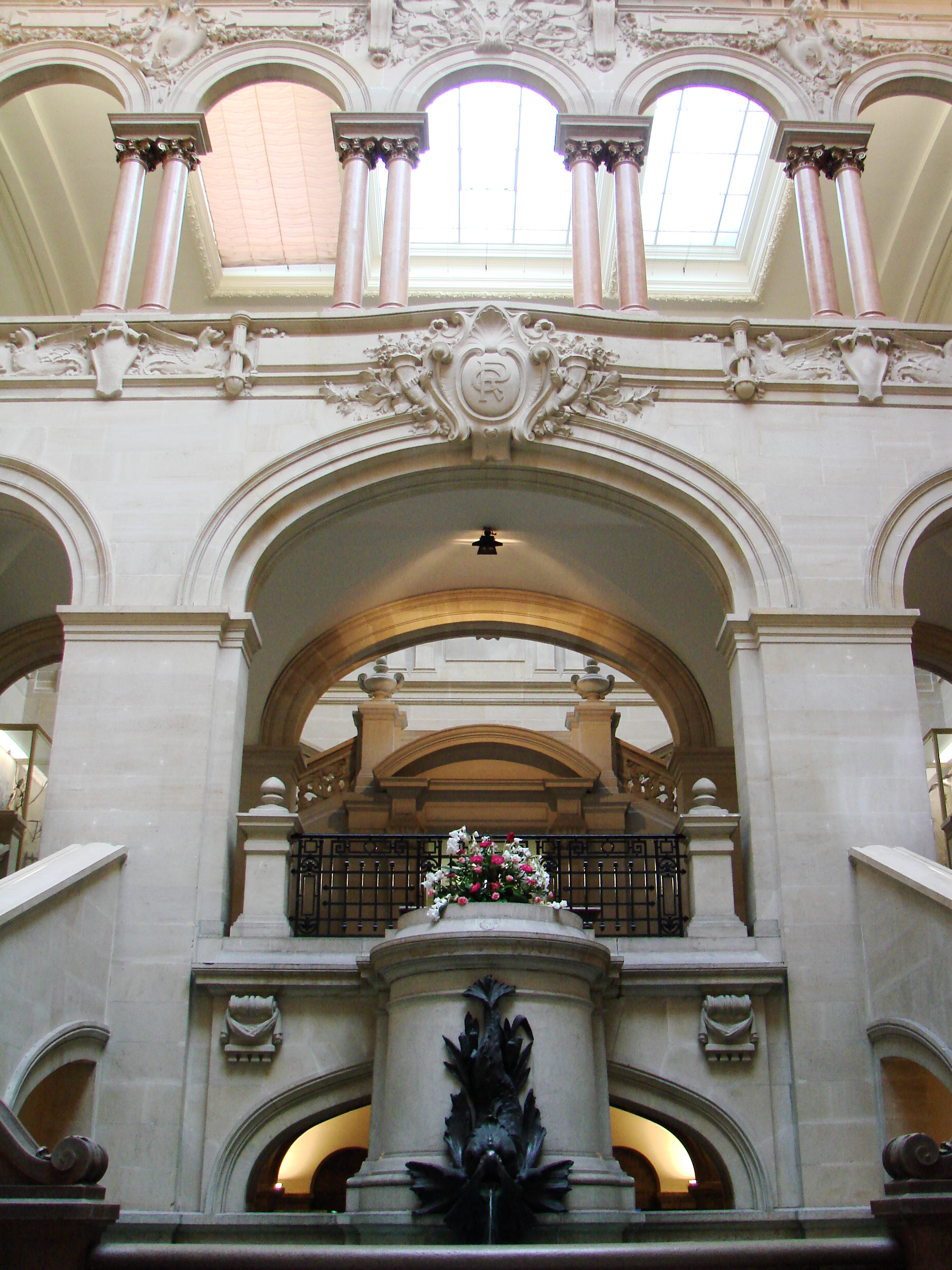
The fountain

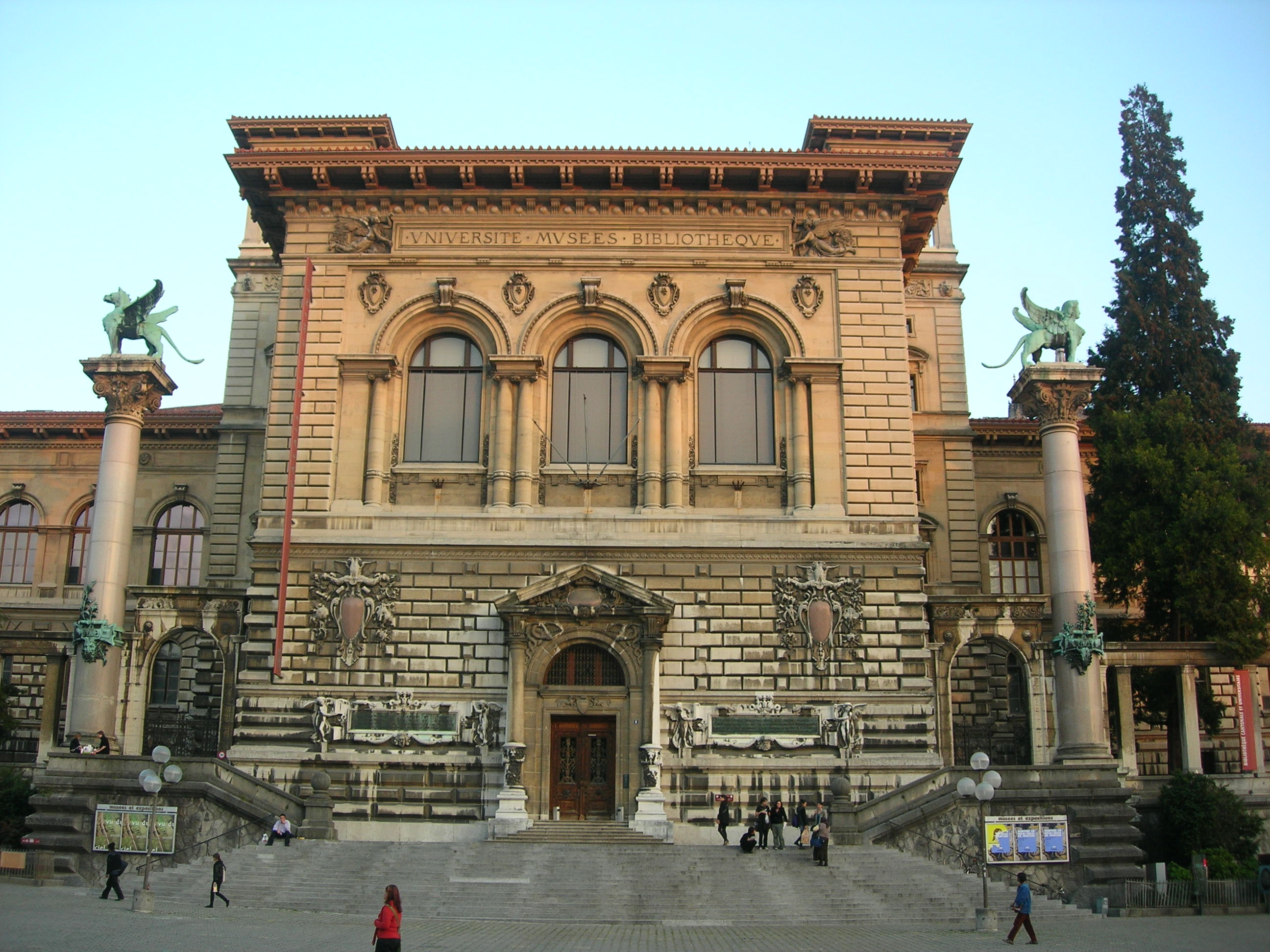
Main entrance of the Palais de Rumine, on the Place de la Riponne

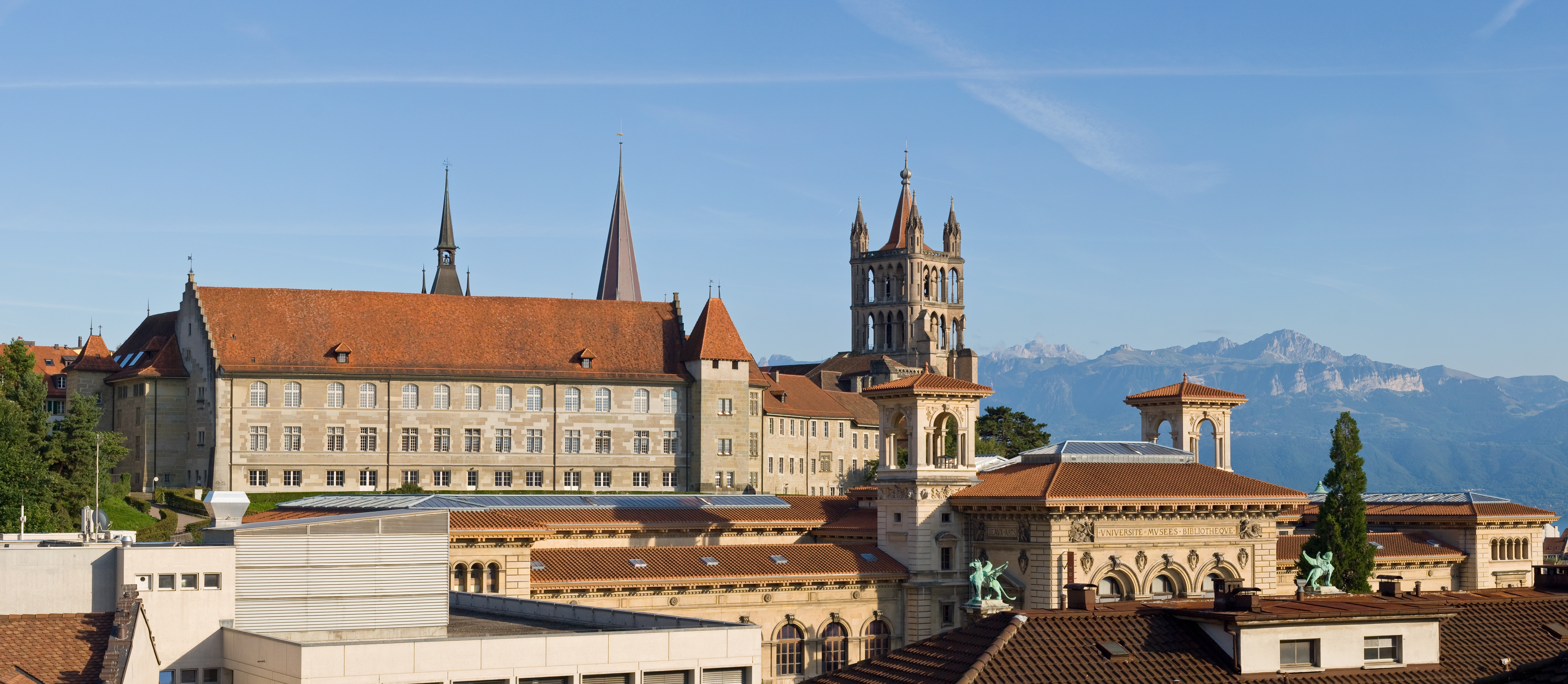
Panorama, showing Lausanne Cathedral, the Ancienne Académie, and the Palais de Rumine

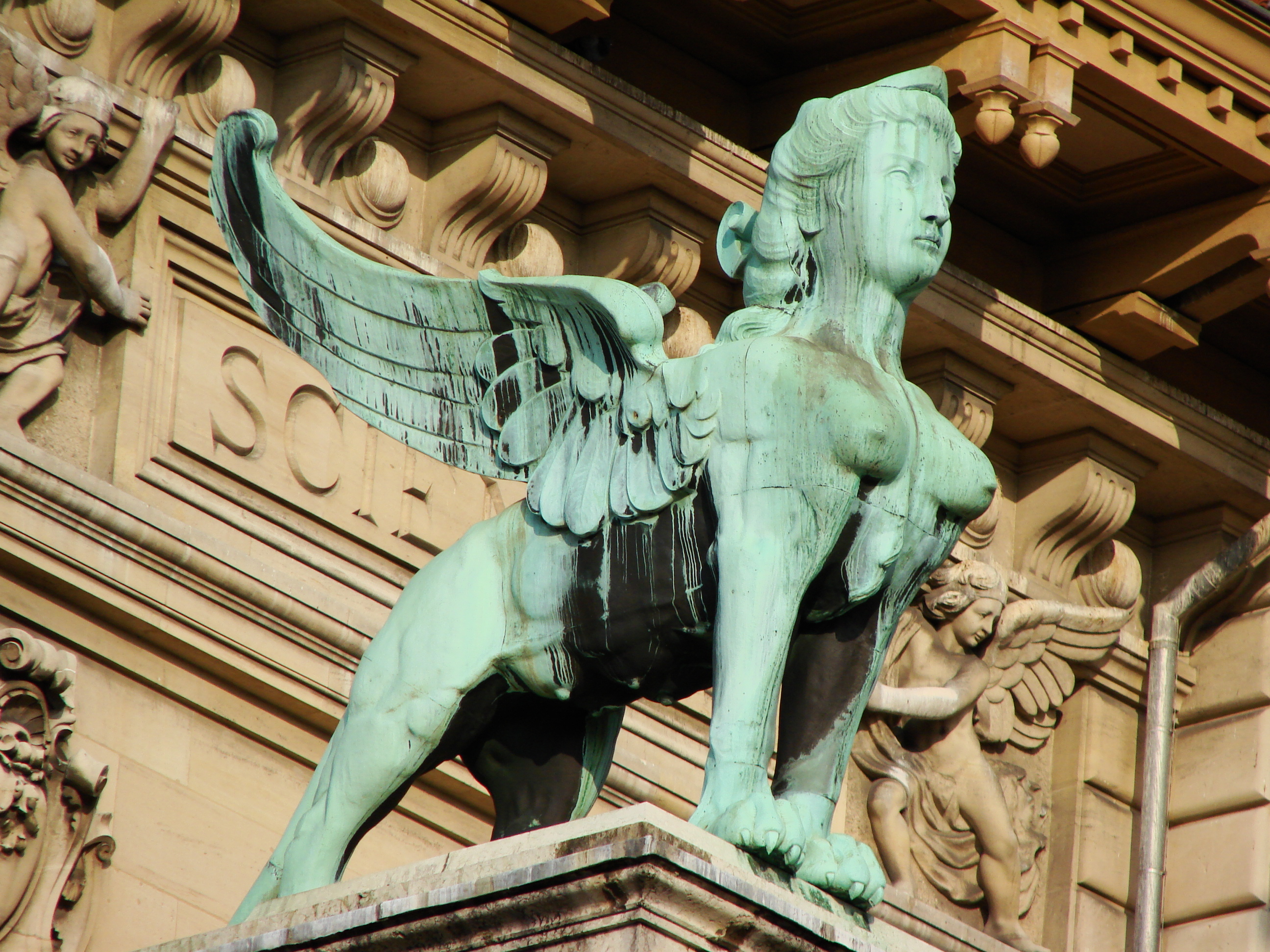
Statue

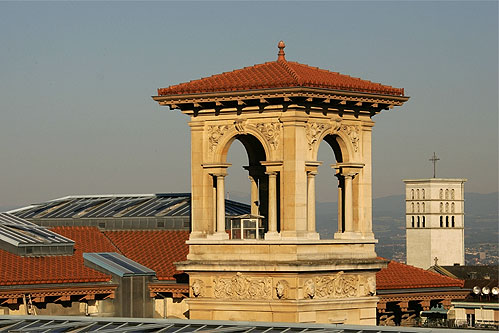
Turret

== See also ==
- List of cultural property of national significance in Switzerland: Vaud
- University of Lausanne

== Notes and references ==
- Édouard Aynard, L'œuvre de Gaspard André, Lyon : A. Storck, 1898. p. 161- 168. OCLC 5107808
- www.vd.ch. "Le palais de Rumine". Archived from the original on 2007-08-14.
- "Dossier des latinistes - Lausanne : quelques exemples d'architecture néo-classique". Archived from the original on 2007-12-02.
