= Treaty of Lausanne Monument and Museum =

Monument and museum in Edirne, Turkey

Treaty of Lausanne Monument
- Lozan Anıtı
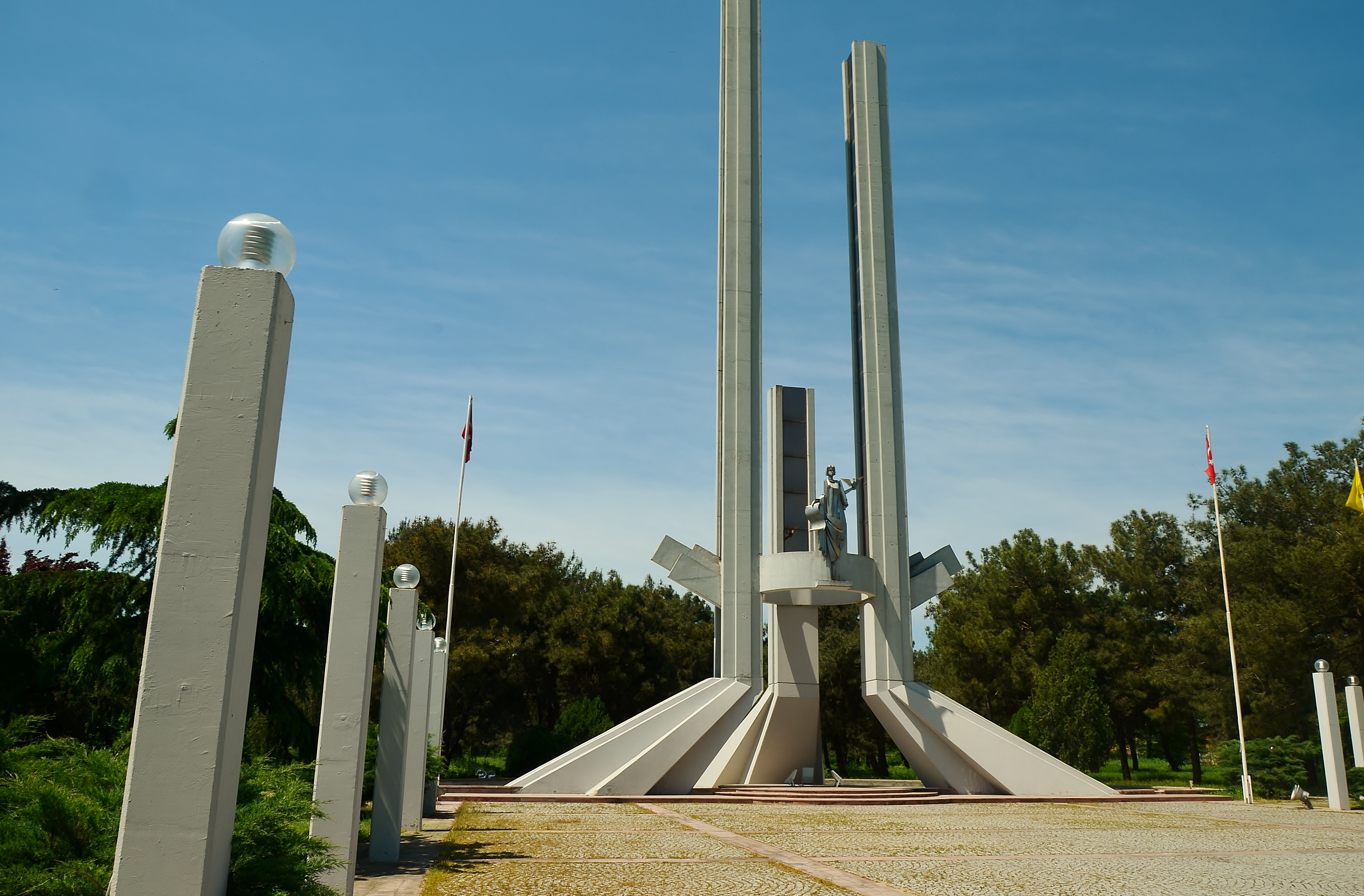
- Treaty of Lausanne Monument
- Interactive map of Treaty of Lausanne Monument
- Location: Karaağaç, Edirne, Turkey
- Coordinates: 41.65256°N 26.52005°E
- Material: Concrete
- Height: 36.45 m (119.6 ft); 31.95 m (104.8 ft); 17.45 m (57.3 ft)
- Beginning date: March 29, 1998
- Opening date: July 19, 1998; 28 years ago
- Dedicated to: Treaty of Lausanne

Treaty of Lausanne Museum
- Lozan Müzesi
- Established: July 19, 1998; 28 years ago
- Location: Karaağaç, Edirne, Turkey
- Type: History
- Founder: Trakya University

The Treaty of Lausanne Monument and Museum (Turkish: Lozan Anıtı ve Müzesi) are a monument and a museum dedicated to the Treaty of Lausanne of 1923. The monument, opened in 1998, is located at Karaağaç, Edirne in Turkey, and the museum is next to it in the former train station building.

== Background ==
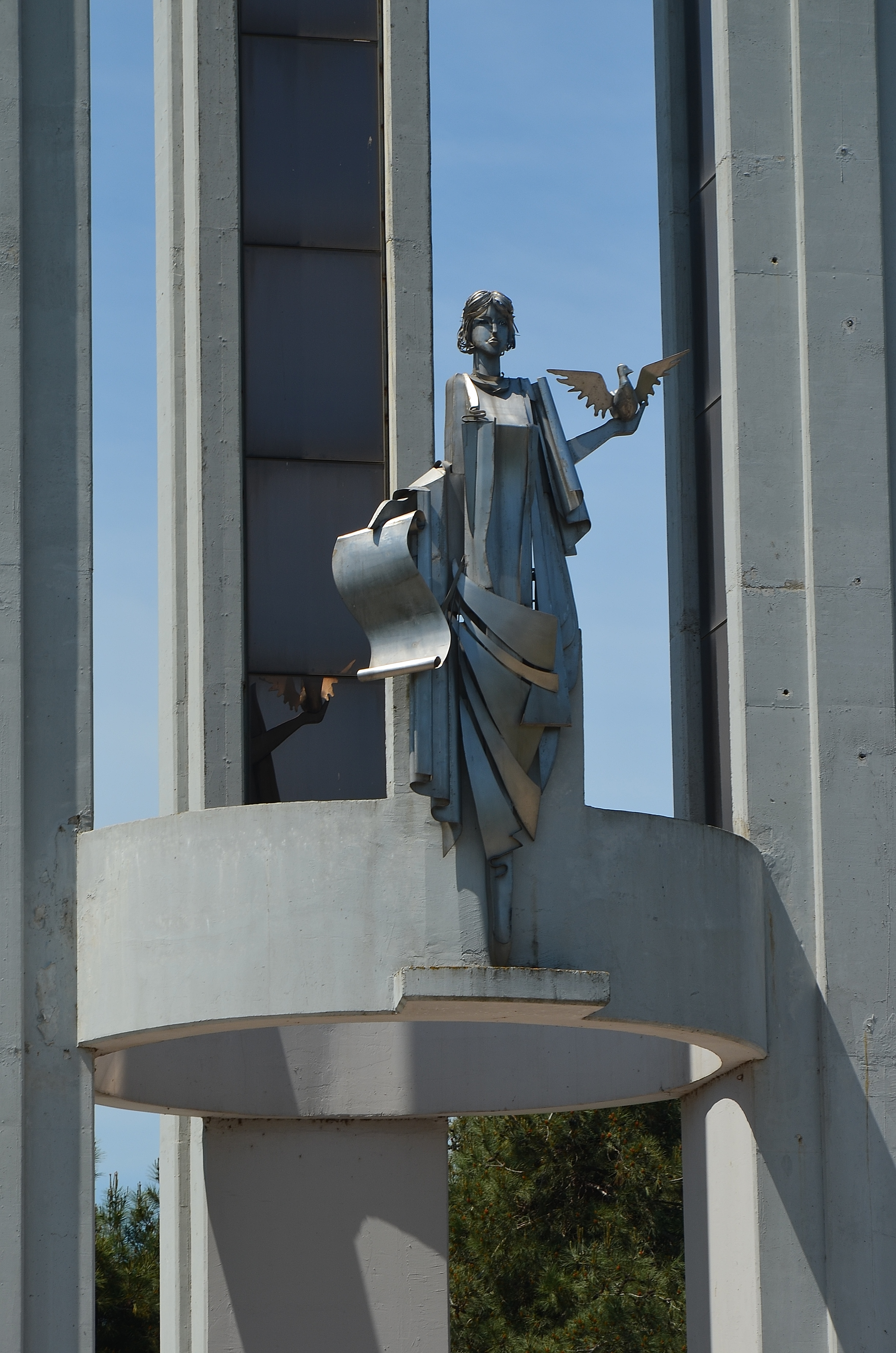
Treaty of Lausanne Monument

The Treaty of Sèvres, that marked the end of World War I, was signed between the Ottoman Empire and the Allies on 10 August 1920.

It was, however, rejected by the Turkish national movement due to significant loss of territory, and accordingly failed. Following the victorious Turkish War of Independence fought against the Allied forces of British Empire, French Republic, Kingdom of Italy and Kingdom of Greece, who had occupied a great portion of Turkish mainland, the Treaty of Lausanne was signed in Lausanne, Switzerland on 24 July 1923.

This second peace treaty ended the conflict between the Turkish nationalists and the Allies, and also defined the borders of the modern Turkish Republic.

In line with the treaty, the Greek-Turkish border was redrawn, and Karaağaç quarter of Edirne (then known in English as Adrianople), on the south bank of the Maritsa river, was returned from Greece to Turkey. Karaağaç railway station, which was the main train station of Edirne, was in use until 1971 when a new station was built on the other side of the Maritsa.

The old railway station buildings and the surrounding area were subsequently assigned to Trakya University. and following redevelopment housed the university administration.

In 1996, the senate of Trakya University decided upon the establishment of a monument and a museum adjacent to the former railway station.

Breaking of the ground for the new monument took place on 29 March 1998, and its construction took just four months. It was inaugurated by the then President Süleyman Demirel (in office 1993–2000) on 19 July 1998, on the 75th anniversary of the Republic.

The area surrounding the monument was established as a public park through the planting of 74 young trees to commemorate the 74th anniversary of the foundation of the Turkish Republic. Following this it was decided that every year a new young tree should be planted.

Trakya University budgeted the project to ₺ 148 billion (approximately US$617,000 at that time).

== Monument ==
The monument consists of three concrete columns in different sizes, erected onto three separate concrete consoles, inclined at 45 degrees and standing on raft foundation. The longest column with 36.45 m (119.6 ft) height represents Anadolu (Anatolia) as the mainland of Turkey on Asia. The second column is 31.95 m (104.8 ft) tall and symbolizes Trakya (Thrace), the western part of Turkey on Europe. The third column, standing in the mid of the other two, represents Karaağaç with its 17.45 m (57.3 ft) height.

A concrete ring at 7.20 m (23.6 ft) height, which ties the columns, represents unity and solidarity. In front of the ring, a 4.20 m (13.8 ft) tall metal statue of a young woman represents aesthetics, grace and justice. The young woman figure holds a dove in her left hand symbolizing peace and democracy, and a document in the right hand, which stands for the Treaty of Lausanne. A semicircular pool with 15 m (49 ft) radius at the feet of the monument represents the seas around three sides of Turkey.

A bust of İsmet İnönü (1884–1973), who acted as the chief negotiator for Turkey during the Conference of Lausanne, is situated at entrance inside the park.

== Museum ==
A museum was established in the auxiliary building of Karaağaç railway station. It contains in two rooms all the documents, records and photographs belonging to the Treaty of Lausanne as well as personal belongings of İsmet İnönü and cartoons depicting him. Various books related to the peace treaty are displayed in the entrance hallway.
