= Félix Chavannes =

Swiss pastor and writer (1802–1863)

- Born: 5 December 1802; Vevey, Helvetic Republic
- Died: 6 September 1863 (aged 60); Lausanne, Switzerland
- Occupations: Pastor; military chaplain; writer
- Spouse: Adélaïde Rochat (m. 1831)
- Father: Daniel-Alexandre Chavannes

Félix Chavannes (5 December 1802 – 6 September 1863) was a Swiss pastor and writer from the Chavannes family. He was a pastor in Lausanne from 1848 to 1856, an army chaplain during the Sonderbund War, and one of the founders of the Société d'histoire de la Suisse romande.

== Biography ==
Félix Chavannes was born in Vevey, the son of Daniel-Alexandre Chavannes. In 1831 he married Adélaïde Rochat, daughter of David Moïse Rochat, a pastor.

Chavannes studied in Lausanne and was ordained a pastor in 1829. He was assistant pastor (suffragant) first in Yverdon and from 1832 in La Sarraz, then pastor in Chevroux from 1842 to 1844, in La Sarraz from 1844 to 1845 and in Lausanne from 1848 to 1856. He served as an army chaplain during the Sonderbund War and again in 1849.

A friend of Frédéric de Gingins, Chavannes was among the founders of the Société d'histoire de la Suisse romande. He published Les Etrennes vaudoises (1858), Le Quêteur (1858), Le Quêteur du Léman (1860) and Méditations bibliques (1862). From 1817 to 1819 he was a member of the academic society Belles-Lettres.

== Bibliography ==
- E. Chavannes, Notes sur la famille Chavannes, [1882]
- Belles-Lettres (Lausanne), Livre d'or du 175e anniversaire, 1806–1981, 1981, 33
