= Cornélie Chavannes =

Swiss educator (1794–1874)

- Born: 22 March 1794; Vevey, Old Swiss Confederacy
- Died: 14 May 1874 (aged 80); Lausanne, Switzerland
- Occupations: Teacher; school director
- Father: Daniel-Alexandre Chavannes

Cornélie Chavannes (22 March 1794 – 14 May 1874) was a Swiss educator from the Chavannes family. From its foundation in 1837 until 1845 she was director of the teacher training college for women of the canton of Vaud, and in 1840 she published a textbook for girls' education, the Cours d'économie domestique.

== Biography ==
Cornélie Chavannes was born in Vevey, the daughter of Daniel-Alexandre Chavannes. She was educated within her family and did not marry. Her sister was the painter and writer Herminie (1798–1853).

Chavannes was director of the teacher training college for women of the canton of Vaud (école normale des institutrices) from its foundation in 1837. She was chosen for the post because she was involved in primary education and ran a free school. In 1840 she published a textbook for the instruction specific to girls, the Cours d'économie domestique (5th edition 1868), which was translated into German in 1843.

At the time of the Radical revolution of 1845 she resigned, together with Frédéric Gauthey, director of the teacher training college for men (école normale des instituteurs), who like her sympathized with the Réveil movement. She then opened a private school in Lausanne.

== Bibliography ==
- Une école pour l'école, 1983
