= Cantonal Museum of Zoology =

Swiss national sciences museum

Coordinates: 46.5236°N 6.6339°E

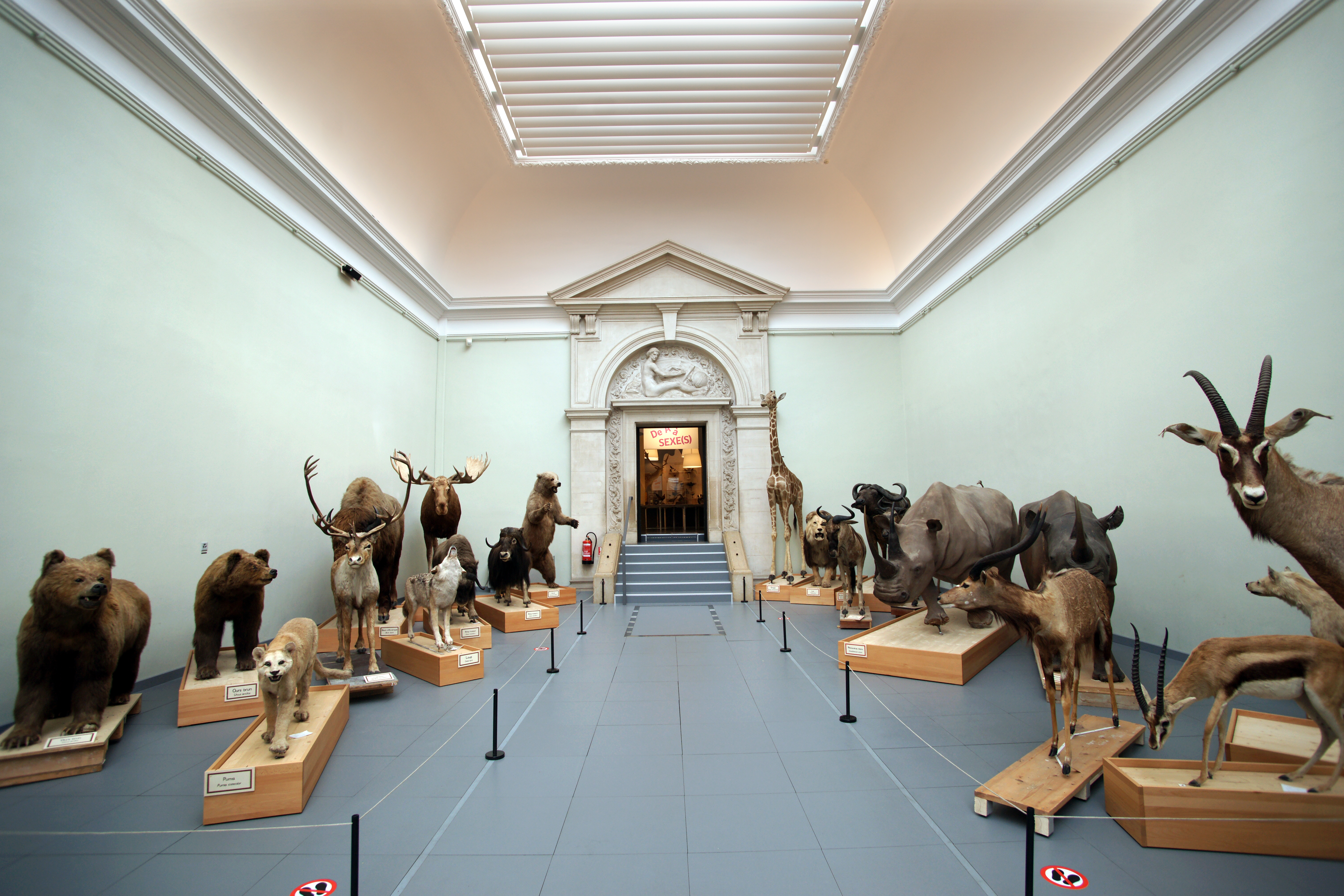
Inside the Cantonal Museum of Zoology

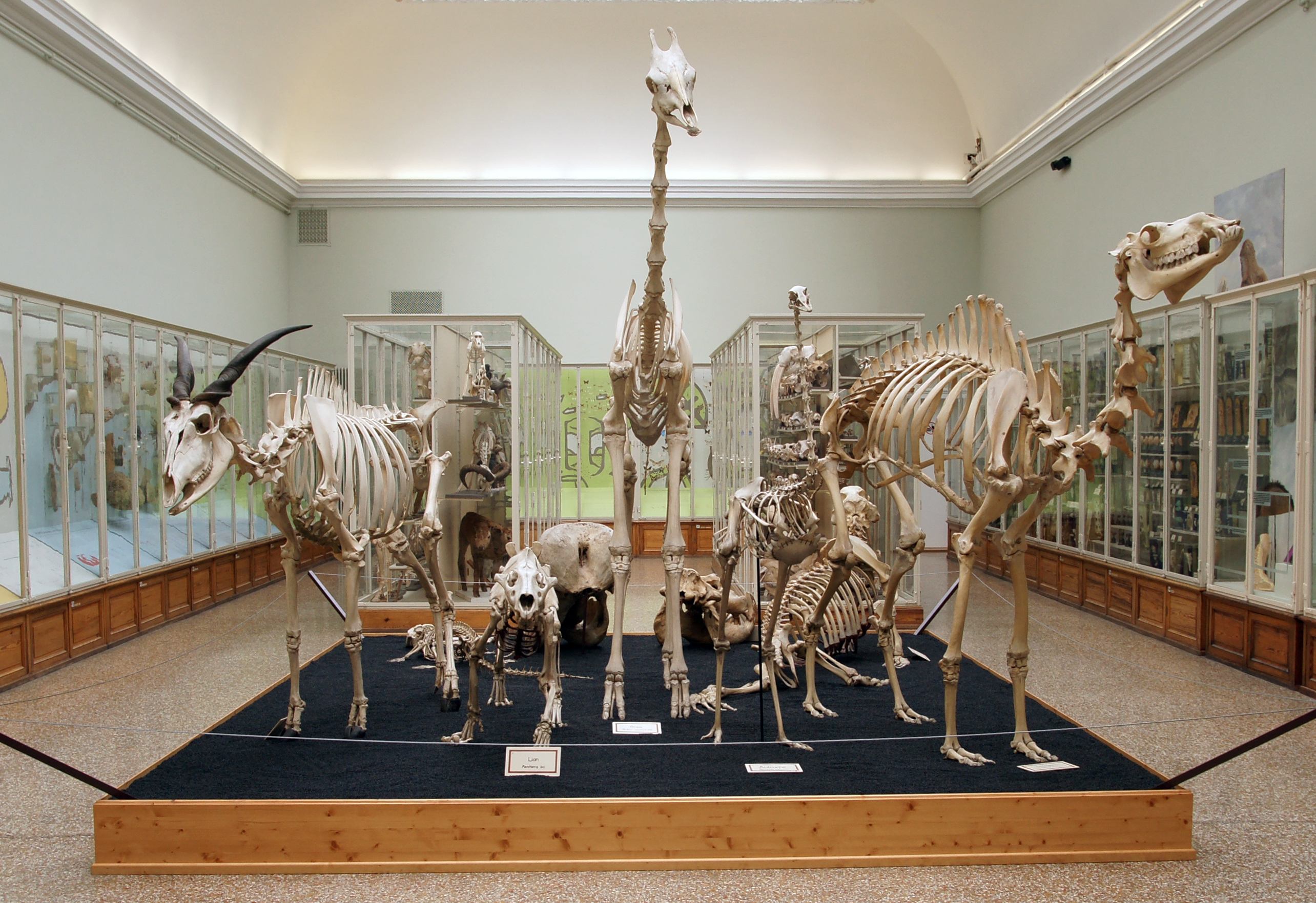

The Cantonal Museum of Zoology in Lausanne has been merged and, as of 1 January 2023, became a department of the Naturéum, a Swiss museum dedicated to the natural sciences. The zoological department is located in the Palais de Rumine, Lausanne, Switzerland.

== History ==
The museum's history dates from 1779, when the "objects" of natural history in the Académie de Lausanne were indexed by Daniel-Alexandre Chavannes.

In 1826, Chavannes's vertebrate collection was purchased by L'Etat de Vaud. The museum opened in the Académie de Lausanne in 1833. In 1886, the museum acquired 1,300 bird specimens from Albert Vouga (1829–1896), the author of Album Neuchâtelois. Vues historiques et pittoresques a book of landscape and natural history photography.

The museum moved to its present location Palais de Rumine in 1906.

== Collections ==
Important collections of later date include the ant collection of Auguste Forel and the insect collection of the then Director Jacques Aubert (1916–1995).

The zoological and cryptozoological collection and archive of Bernard Heuvelmans is held at the museum and consists of around 1,000 books, 25,000 files, 25,000 photographs, correspondence, and artifacts.

The museum holds parts of Vladimir Nabokov's butterfly collection.

== See also ==
- List of natural history museums
- List of museums in Switzerland
