= Karaağaç, Edirne =

Karaağaç
- Neighbourhood
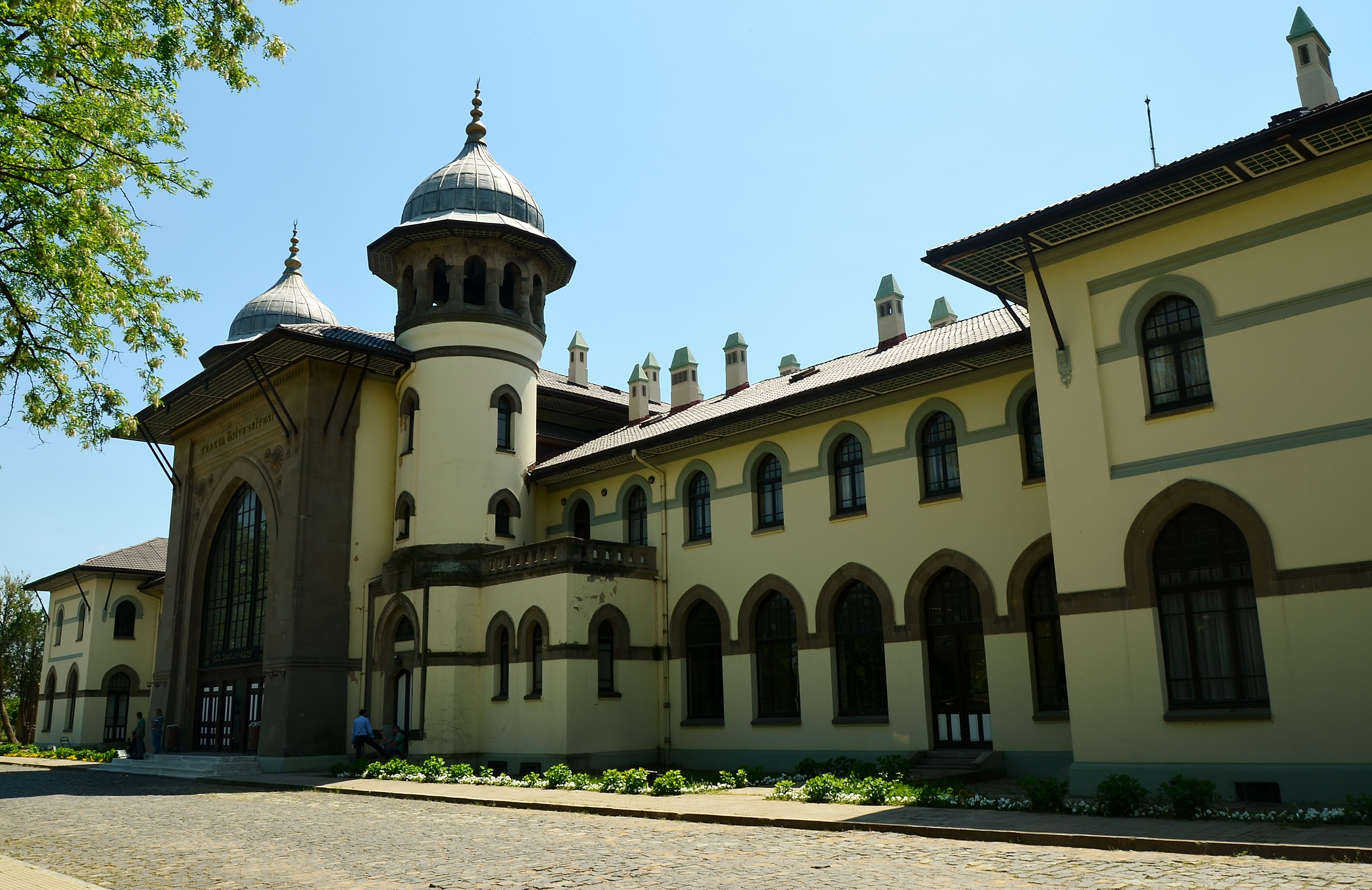
- Historic railway station in Karaağaç used as Trakya University's Faculty of Fine Arts.

- Location within Turkey Location within Marmara
- Coordinates: 41°39′20″N 26°31′30″E
- Country: Turkey
- Province: Edirne
- District: Edirne
- Municipality: Edirne
- Population (2022): 3,062
- Time zone: UTC+3 (TRT)
- Postal code: 22050
- Area code: 0284

Karaağaç is a neighbourhood of the city Edirne, Edirne District, Edirne Province, northwestern Turkey. Its population is 3,062 (2022). It is situated at the border with Greece. Together with the village of Bosna, it is one of the two Turkish settlements in East Thrace situated on the right bank of the river Meriç, therefore within Western Thrace. Karaağaç is 4 km southwest from the center of Edirne, across the river Meriç and opposite the Greek village Kastanies. In 1890, the large Karaağaç railway station was built in the town, which also served Edirne, becoming the last train stop in Turkey to Europe. In 1971, Turkish State Railways (TCDD) constructed a new railway station at the opposite side of the river, abandoning the former one, which is now used as Trakya University's Faculty of Fine Arts.

The Treaty of Lausanne Monument and Museum, which opened in 1998, are located next to the former railway station.

== History ==
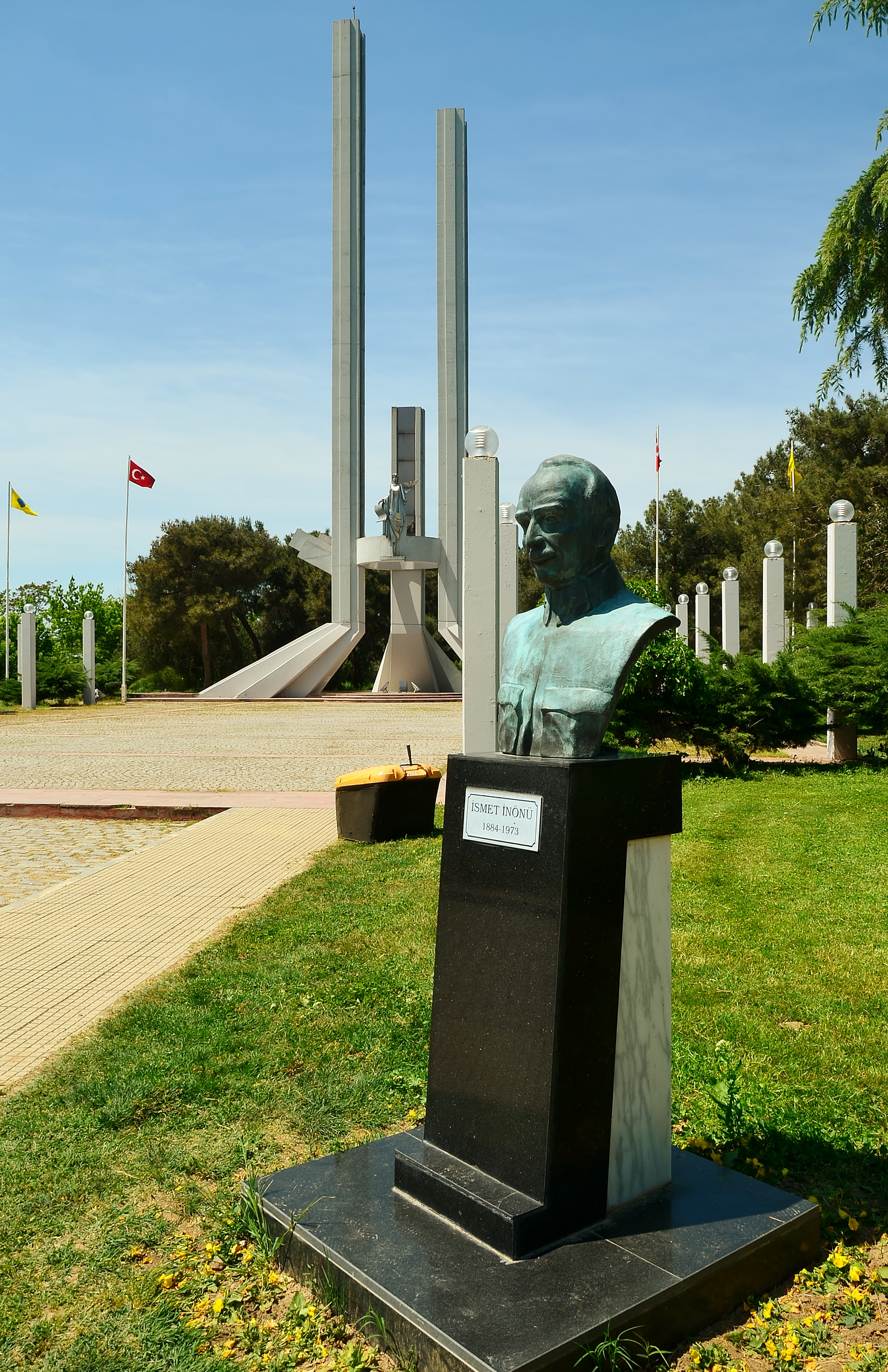
Treaty of Lausanne Monument in Karaağaç with bust of İsmet İnönü in foreground

When Greece held the town (1920–1923), Karaağaç was renamed Orestias, in remembrance of the ancient Thracian town with the same name, which probably lay near or at the site of present-day Edirne. Orestias or Orestia is thought to have been the same town as Uscudama (other variants: Uskudama, Uskadama, Uskodama) or Odrysa (other variants: Odrysia, Odrysos, Odrysus) which was the first Odrysian capital. Orestias took its name by the Greeks, at least from the time Philip II of Macedon took over the town. The Roman emperor Hadrian expanded the town into a city, gave it a strong fortification and renamed it Hadrianopolis. However the name Orestias was still used by many writers at the Byzantine era, along with Hadrianopolis.
