= Chavannes family =

Family from Vaud, Switzerland

The Chavannes family is a family from Charmoisy in Savoy that took refuge in Vevey in 1602, during the Counter-Reformation. It produced thirty pastors and theologians. Its members, who included scholars, writers, politicians and bankers, were typical representatives of the liberal, cultivated bourgeoisie of Vaud.

== History ==
The Chavannes came from Charmoisy in Savoy and took refuge in Vevey in 1602, during the Counter-Reformation. They were naturalized in Bern in 1618, and they became citizens of Vevey in 1723 and, for the senior branch, of Lausanne in 1797.

The family produced thirty pastors and theologians, among them Ernest, Félix, Frédéric and Jules. Some of them resigned their posts in 1845, during the Radical revolution, and played an important part in the new Free Church (Église libre). Scholars, writers, notables, politicians and bankers, the Chavannes were typical representatives of the liberal, cultivated bourgeoisie of Vaud, active in public-benefit institutions. The daughters, too, were educated in this spirit: the painter and writer Herminie (1798–1853), her sister Cornélie, and Marguerite Duvillard, née Chavannes. One branch emigrated to the United States in 1848, and another settled in the Dutch East Indies in the 19th century.

== Bibliography ==
- Recueil de généalogies vaudoises, 1, 1922, 311–336, 694
- D. Babelay, They trusted and were delivered: the French-Swiss of Knoxville, Tennessee, 1, 1988, 47–115
