= Alexandre César Chavannes =

Swiss theologian (1731–1800)

- Born: 30 July 1731; Montreux, Old Swiss Confederacy
- Died: 2 May 1800 (aged 68); Lausanne, Helvetic Republic
- Occupations: Theologian; pastor
- Notable work: Anthropologie ou science générale de l'homme
- Parents: César Chavannes (father); Louise Cormod (mother)
- Relatives: Daniel-Alexandre Chavannes (nephew)

Alexandre César Chavannes (30 July 1731 – 2 May 1800) was a Swiss theologian and pastor. He was pastor of the French church in Basel and, from 1766, professor of theology at the Academy of Lausanne. He was a leading figure in the move away from traditional Calvinist ideas and advocated an empirical and historical anthropology with educational aims. His work Anthropologie ou science générale de l'homme is of outstanding importance.

== Biography ==
Alexandre César Chavannes was born in Montreux, the son of César, a pastor in Montreux, and Louise Cormod. He remained unmarried. From 1742 to 1748 he studied philosophy and theology in Lausanne, and he was ordained in 1753. In 1759 he became vicar and in 1763 pastor of the French church in Basel, where he became friends with the Bernoulli family. From 1766 he was professor of theology at the Academy of Lausanne. He took charge of the education of his nephew Daniel-Alexandre Chavannes.

Chavannes was a leading figure in the move away from traditional Calvinist ideas. He advocated an empirical and historical anthropology combined with educational aims: in his view, the education of the individual, as a process, was equivalent to the path that humanity had traveled to reach its present cultural level. His work Anthropologie ou science générale de l'homme is of outstanding importance. He died in Lausanne on 2 May 1800.

== Bibliography ==
- A. Gindroz, Histoire de l'instruction publique dans le Pays de Vaud, 1853, 328–354
- H. Vuilleumier, Histoire de l'Eglise réformée du Pays de Vaud sous le régime bernois, 4, 1933, 313–325
- S. Moravia, La scienza dell'uomo nel Settecento, 1970, 110–112
- I. Schulte-Tenckhoff, La vue portée au loin, 1985

=== Archives ===
- Musée monétaire cantonal, Lausanne (papers)
