= Ernest Chavannes =

Swiss pastor and bookseller (1821–1895)

- Born: 15 April 1821; Aubonne, Switzerland
- Died: 6 January 1895 (aged 73); Lausanne, Switzerland
- Occupations: Pastor; tutor; bookseller
- Spouse: Léonie Susanne Marie Sylvie Dapples (m. 1849)
- Parents: Jean David Alexandre Chavannes (father); Catherine Coker (mother)

Ernest Chavannes (15 April 1821 – 6 January 1895) was a Swiss pastor and bookseller from the Chavannes family. After resigning as an assistant pastor in 1845, he worked as a tutor in England and then for the Société évangélique de France in Paris, and from 1857 to 1886 he ran a bookshop in Lausanne. He also published several scholarly studies.

== Biography ==
Ernest Chavannes was born in Aubonne, the son of Jean David Alexandre, a pastor, and Catherine Coker, who was Welsh. In 1849 he married Léonie Susanne Marie Sylvie Dapples, daughter of Sylvius Dapples.

Chavannes studied in Lausanne and was ordained a pastor in 1844. He was assistant pastor (suffragant) in Grandson and Commugny, resigned in 1845 and went to England, where he worked as a private tutor. He then worked in Paris for the Société évangélique de France. He returned to Switzerland in the early 1850s, first taught English, and from 1857 to 1886 ran a bookshop in Lausanne (Martignier et Chavannes).

From 1858 Chavannes was a member of the Société d'histoire de la Suisse romande. He published several scholarly studies, including Le Trésor de l'église cathédrale de Lausanne (1873) and Comptes de la châtellenie de Chillon (1890).

== Bibliography ==
- E. Chavannes, Notes sur la famille Chavannes, [1882]
- Gazette de Lausanne, 7 January 1895
- Belles-Lettres (Lausanne), Livre d'or du 175e anniversaire, 1806–1981, 1981, 82
