= François Louis Duvillard =

Swiss notary and politician (1748–1836)

- Baptised: 18 May 1748; Nyon, Old Swiss Confederacy
- Died: 23 August 1836; Tannay, Switzerland
- Occupations: Notary; politician
- Spouses: Jeanne-Pernette Rochaix; Louise Favre; Albertine Marianne Bugnion
- Father: Pierre Duvillard

François Louis Duvillard (baptized 18 May 1748 – 23 August 1836) was a Swiss notary and politician. He was a notary in Nyon from 1774 to 1833, a member of the Grand Council of Vaud from 1803 to 1811 and of the Small Council from 1803 to 1805, and mayor of Tannay from 1815 to 1832. In 1806 he had the first mechanical threshing machine in Switzerland built in Tannay.

== Biography ==
François Louis Duvillard was baptized in Nyon on 18 May 1748, the son of Pierre Duvillard, a merchant tanner (marchand-tanneur). He married three times: Jeanne-Pernette Rochaix, Louise Favre, and Albertine Marianne Bugnion, daughter of Charles Bugnion, a pastor.

Duvillard was a notary in Nyon from 1774 to 1833. Before 1798 he was curial (court clerk) of Nyon and Coppet, and in 1786 and 1795 he was gouverneur (village head) of Tannay. In March 1798 he was an alternate member of the administrative chamber (Chambre administrative) of the canton of Léman.

Duvillard sat in the Grand Council of Vaud from 1803 until his resignation in 1811. As a member of the Small Council (Petit Conseil) from 1803 to 1805, he played an important part in establishing the land register (cadastre). From 1815 to 1832 he was mayor (syndic) of Tannay, where in 1806 he had the first mechanical threshing machine in Switzerland built.

== Bibliography ==
- J. Plojoux, Généalogie de la famille Duvillard, manuscript, 1930, 9–16 (Archives cantonales vaudoises)
- J.-D. Amiguet, Le Grand Conseil vaudois sous l'Acte de Médiation (1803–1813), licentiate thesis, Lausanne, 1976, 92–93
