= Marguerite Duvillard-Chavannes =

Swiss women's movement activist (1851–1925)

- Born: Marguerite Chavannes; 26 March 1851; Lausanne, Switzerland
- Died: 8 December 1925 (aged 74); Lausanne, Switzerland
- Spouse: Jules Duvillard (m. 1874)
- Parents: Alfred Chavannes (father); Charlotte Fabre (mother)

Marguerite Duvillard-Chavannes (born Marguerite Chavannes; married name Marguerite Duvillard; 26 March 1851 – 8 December 1925) was a Swiss activist in the women's movement. In 1897 she co-founded the Union des femmes de Lausanne (Lausanne Women's Union), of which she was the first president until 1903, and in 1900 she took part in founding the Federation of Swiss Women's Associations (German Bund Schweizerischer Frauenvereine, French Alliance de sociétés féminines suisses).

== Biography ==
Marguerite Chavannes was a member of the Chavannes family and the daughter of Alfred Chavannes, a physician, and Charlotte née Fabre. She grew up with her grandparents in Lausanne. In 1874 she married Jules Duvillard.

In 1897 she co-founded the Union des femmes de Lausanne and was its first president until 1903. As presidents of the progressive women's associations of Bern, Zurich, Lausanne and Geneva, Helene von Mülinen, Emma Boos-Jegher, Duvillard-Chavannes and Camille Vidart dealt with questions of education and law. In 1899 they called for the founding of the Federation of Swiss Women's Associations (BSF), which took place a year later. Duvillard-Chavannes took part in its founding in 1900, and she sought a union of Swiss women across class, language and denominational lines.

== Bibliography ==
- Bulletin féminin, 1, 1926
- Le Mouvement féministe, 22 January 1926
