= Frédéric Chavannes =

Swiss pastor and writer (1803–1893)

- Born: 24 October 1803; Lausanne, Switzerland
- Died: 22 August 1893 (aged 89); Lausanne, Switzerland
- Occupations: Pastor; teacher; writer
- Spouse: Louise (Elise) Curchod (m. 1828)
- Parents: Jean Antoine François Chavannes (father); Françoise Madeleine Porta (mother)

Frédéric Chavannes (24 October 1803 – 22 August 1893) was a Swiss pastor, teacher and writer from the Chavannes family. He was principal of the collège of Vevey and a mathematics teacher, and in 1838 he published a collection of Christian poems and hymns. From 1847 to 1857 he was pastor of the Walloon church in Amsterdam.

== Biography ==
Frédéric Chavannes was born in Lausanne, the son of Jean Antoine François, a pastor, and Françoise Madeleine Porta. In 1828 he married Louise Curchod, known as Elise, daughter of François Moïse Curchod.

Chavannes studied at the Academy of Lausanne and was ordained a pastor in 1827. From 1827 to 1834 he was principal of the collège (secondary school) of Vevey, and from 1834 to 1847 he taught mathematics at the teachers' college (école normale) and at the cantonal collège. He was a regular contributor to the Revue suisse, and in 1838 he published a collection of poems, Poésies chrétiennes et cantiques.

Chavannes resigned from the ministry in 1845. From 1847 to 1857 he was pastor of the Walloon church in Amsterdam. After his return to Switzerland he worked on several theological publications, including a book on Alexandre Vinet (1883).

== Bibliography ==
- E. Chavannes, Notes sur la famille Chavannes, [1882]
