= Édouard-Louis Chavannes =

Swiss botanist (1805-1861)

- Born: 7 August 1805; Lausanne (Switzerland)
- Died: 30 August 1861 (aged 56); Lausanne (Switzerland)
- Occupations: Botanist and University Professor

Édouard Louis Chavannes (1805–1861) was a Swiss botanist and philanthropist. Son of César Louis, pastor, and Adrienne Charlotte Renz, he studied theology at the academies of Lausanne and Geneva, where he was a pupil of the botanist Augustin-Pyramus de Candolle.

With de Candolle, he studied the antirrhineae (wolf's mouths) and published a monograph to them (Monographie des antirrhinées) in 1833. He published observations on the biological properties of starch. C. and worked in London with the botanist Robert Brown.

In the University of Lausanne, the existence of a Natural History Society influenced the development of Botany, of which Édouard Louis Chavannes, became its first Associate Professor from 1835 to 1844.

He became a curator of the Vaud Cantonal Botanical Museum in 1844. Created in 1824, the botanical gardens already had an expansive collection that only grew twenty years later with the British collections provided by the Natural History Museum.

Also a teacher at the École Normale (1837–1844), he was the author of the Botanical Statistics of the Canton of Vaud (1846). A member of the Council of Public Instruction, an artillery officer, he was in charge of the instruction of the cadets of the college. In 1845, deprived of his public functions, he formed with Charles-Amédée Kohler a relief fund for resigning ministers, which he administered until its liquidation.

In 1846 Chavannes went on a botanic expedition to Brazil. He sent back samples of algae diatoms to Christian Gottfried Ehrenberg in Germany, where Ehrenberg collated the work of several other European botanists working in Brazil. In Chavannes' case his work was attributed to two sets of algae samples found in soil located approximately 5 km off the Brazilian coastline near Mongaguá, in the state of São Paulo.

Chavannes remained active in the Protestant church, and was a member of the synod for the Free Church.

== Publications ==
- 1830. Mémoire sur les propriétés et les usages de la fécule amylacée, considérée dans les divers végétaux qui la contiennent. Ed. Samuel Delisle, 35 pp.
- 1833. Monographie des antirrhinées. París & Lausanne, 190 pp.
- 1840. Sommaire du cours des sciences physiques donné à l'Ecole normale, manuscript, 264 pp.

== Honors ==
=== Eponymy ===
Genus

- Apocynaceae: Chavannesia A.DC.

Species

- Scrophulariaceae: Antirrhinum × chavannesii Rothm.
