= Daniel-Alexandre Chavannes =

Swiss pastor and zoologist (1765–1846)

- Bust by Auguste Clésinger
- Born: 21 July 1765; Vevey, Old Swiss Confederacy
- Died: 29 October 1846 (aged 81); Lausanne, Switzerland
- Occupations: Pastor; politician; zoologist
- Spouse: Hélène-Cornélie Châtelain (m. 1793)
- Parents: François Chavannes (father); Henriette Madeleine Friquet (mother)
- Relatives: Alexandre César Chavannes (uncle)

Daniel-Alexandre Chavannes (21 July 1765 – 29 October 1846) was a Swiss pastor, politician and zoologist. He sat in the Grand Council of Vaud from 1803 to 1836 and was its secretary for twenty-six years. He taught zoology at the Academy of Lausanne from 1813 to 1843 and initiated the Cantonal Museum of Zoology, founded in 1818.

== Biography ==
Daniel-Alexandre Chavannes was born in Vevey, the son of François, a pastor, and Henriette Madeleine Friquet. His uncle, Alexandre César Chavannes, took charge of his education. In 1793 he married Hélène-Cornélie Châtelain, daughter of Daniel Châtelain, a citizen of Amsterdam and former pastor of the Walloon church in Rotterdam.

Chavannes studied at the Academy of Lausanne and was ordained in 1788. He was assistant pastor (suffragant) in Vevey from 1789 to 1796 and then in Corsier-sur-Vevey from 1796 to 1798. In 1790–1791 he spent a period of study in Germany and Holland. In 1798 he took part in founding the Société des amis de la liberté et de l'égalité, and he was an unsuccessful candidate for the post of pastor in Lucerne that the Directory of the Helvetic Republic had created. From 1798 to 1811 he was catechist and subdeacon in Vevey.

Chavannes was a member of the Grand Council of Vaud from 1803 to 1836 and its secretary for twenty-six years. From 1806 he was a member of the academic council (Conseil académique). He was one of the co-founders of the Société d'émulation du canton de Vaud, of the Société d'agriculture et d'économie générale, for which he edited the semimonthly Feuilles for thirty years, and in 1815 of the Swiss Society of Natural Sciences.

From 1813 Chavannes taught a course in zoology at the Academy. He became an honorary professor in 1820 and continued teaching until 1843. A specialist in Swiss fauna, he initiated the Cantonal Museum of Zoology, founded in 1818, which has housed his remarkable collections since 1833.

== Bibliography ==
- H. Blanc, "Daniel-Alexandre Chavannes, 1765–1846, et Jacques-Auguste Chavannes, 1810–1879", in Actes de la Société helvétique des sciences naturelles, 1, 1909, 19–39
- Ch. Schnetzler, "Le pasteur Daniel-Alexandre Chavannes", in Revue historique vaudoise, 1939, 225–246; 1940, 1–18, 49–59
- P.-E. Pilet, Naturalistes et biologistes à Lausanne, 1991, 34–36
