= Kazanlak Peak =

Location of Tangra Mountains on Livingston Island in the South Shetland Islands.

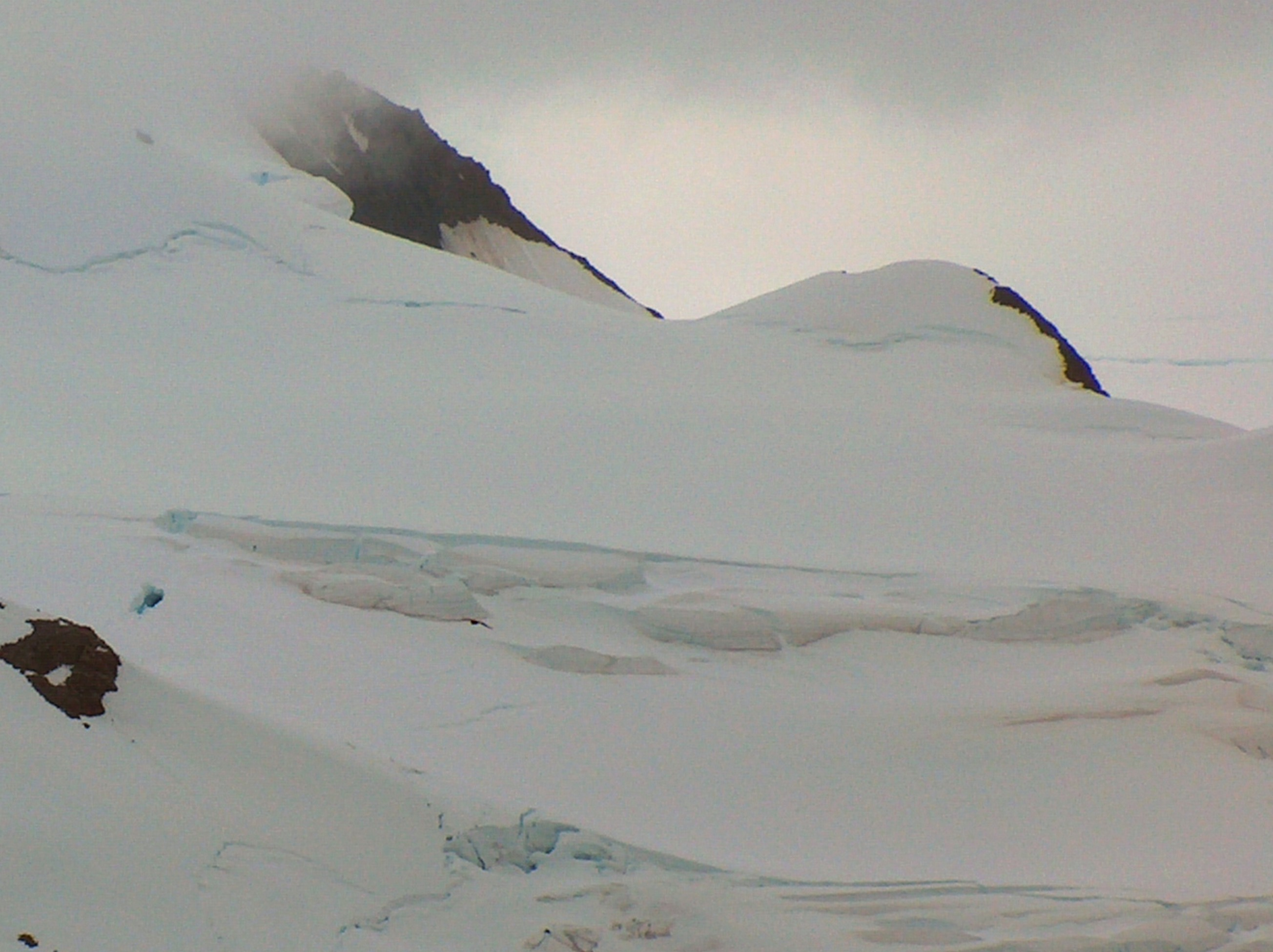
Kazanlak Peak from Half Moon Island.

Topographic map of Livingston Island, Greenwich, Robert, Snow and Smith Islands.

Kazanlak Peak (Bulgarian: връх Казанлък, romanized: vrah Kazanlak, IPA: [ˈvrɤx kɐzɐnˈɫɤk]) is a rocky peak rising to 430 m in Delchev Ridge of Tangra Mountains, Livingston Island in the South Shetland Islands, Antarctica. Surmounting Bruix Cove to the northwest, Iskar Glacier to the southwest and Sopot Ice Piedmont to the east. The peak is named after the city of Kazanlak in central Bulgaria.

== Location ==
The peak is located at 62°37′56.4″S 59°57′21″W which is on the northern side ridge descending from Delchev Peak towards Rila Point, 1.06 km northwest of Peter Peak, and 650 m south-southeast of Ghiaurov Peak (Bulgarian topographic survey Tangra 2004/05 and mapping in 2009).

== Map ==
- L.L. Ivanov. Antarctica: Livingston Island and Greenwich, Robert, Snow and Smith Islands. Scale 1:120000 topographic map. Troyan: Manfred Wörner Foundation, 2009.
