= Vaptsarov Peak =

Peak on Livingston Island, Antarctica

Location of Tangra Mountains on Livingston Island in the South Shetland Islands.

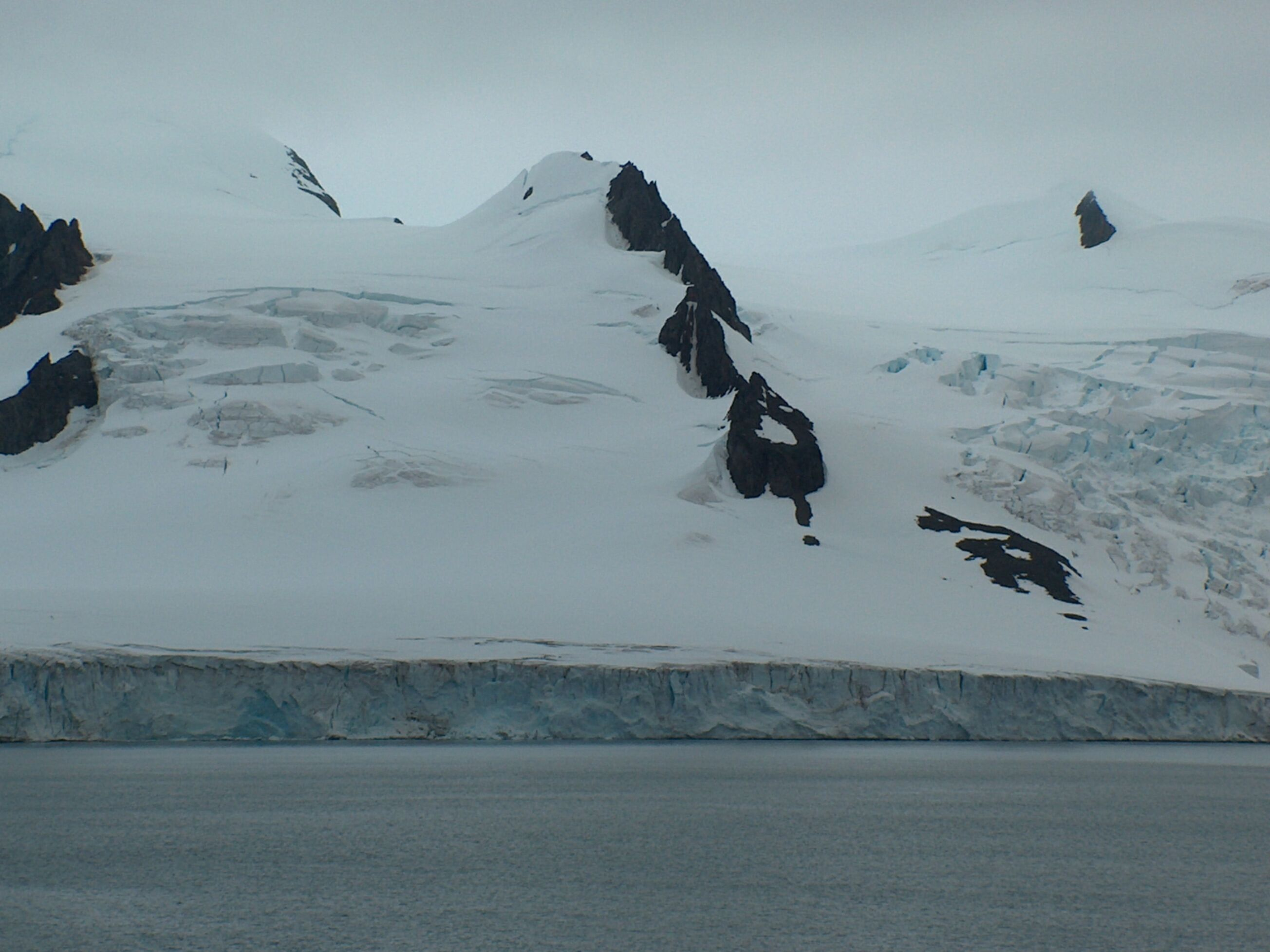
Vaptsarov Peak from Half Moon Island.

Topographic map of Livingston Island and Smith Island

Vaptsarov Peak (Bulgarian: Вапцаров връх, romanized: Vaptsarov vrah, IPA: [vɐpˈt͡sarov ˈvrɤx]) rises to approximately 410 m in Delchev Ridge, Tangra Mountains, eastern Livingston Island in the South Shetland Islands, Antarctica. The peak has steep and ice-free western slopes, and surmounts Ihtiman Hook to the northwest and Sopot Ice Piedmont to the east, north and west.

The peak is named after the famous Bulgarian poet Nikola Vaptsarov (1909–42).

== Location ==
The peak is located at 62°37′13.2″S 59°54′07.5″W, which is 1.21 km north of Elena Peak, 620 m north-northwest of Paisiy Peak, 960 m northeast of Rodopi Peak, 5.07 km west by south of Renier Point, 1.92 km west of Besapara Hill and 2.01 km west by north of Kaloyan Nunatak (Bulgarian mapping in 2005 and 2009).

== Vaptsarov Peak in popular culture ==
The cover of the VA album Under Heaven: Vinson Massif (2010) actually features a photo not of Vinson Massif but of eastern Tangra Mountains instead, with Mugla Passage and Vaptsarov Peak in the foreground, and Elena Peak (left) and Delchev Peak (right) in the background. Both the picture and the misidentification may have possibly originated in the ‘Vinson Massif’ entry of the ‘Seven Summits Quest’ website.

== Maps ==
- L. L. Ivanov et al., Antarctica: Livingston Island and Greenwich Island, South Shetland Islands (from English Strait to Morton Strait, with illustrations and ice-cover distribution), 1:100000 scale topographic map, Antarctic Place-names Commission of Bulgaria, Sofia, 2005
- L. L. Ivanov. Antarctica: Livingston Island and Greenwich, Robert, Snow and Smith Islands. Scale 1:120000 topographic map. Troyan: Manfred Wörner Foundation, 2010. ISBN 978-954-92032-9-5 (First edition 2009. ISBN 978-954-92032-6-4)
- Antarctic Digital Database (ADD). Scale 1:250000 topographic map of Antarctica. Scientific Committee on Antarctic Research (SCAR). Since 1993, regularly upgraded and updated.
- L. L. Ivanov. Antarctica: Livingston Island and Smith Island. Scale 1:100000 topographic map. Manfred Wörner Foundation, 2017. ISBN 978-619-90008-3-0
