= Shabla Knoll =

Knoll in the South Shetland Islands, Antarctica

Location of Tangra Mountains on Livingston Island in the South Shetland Islands.

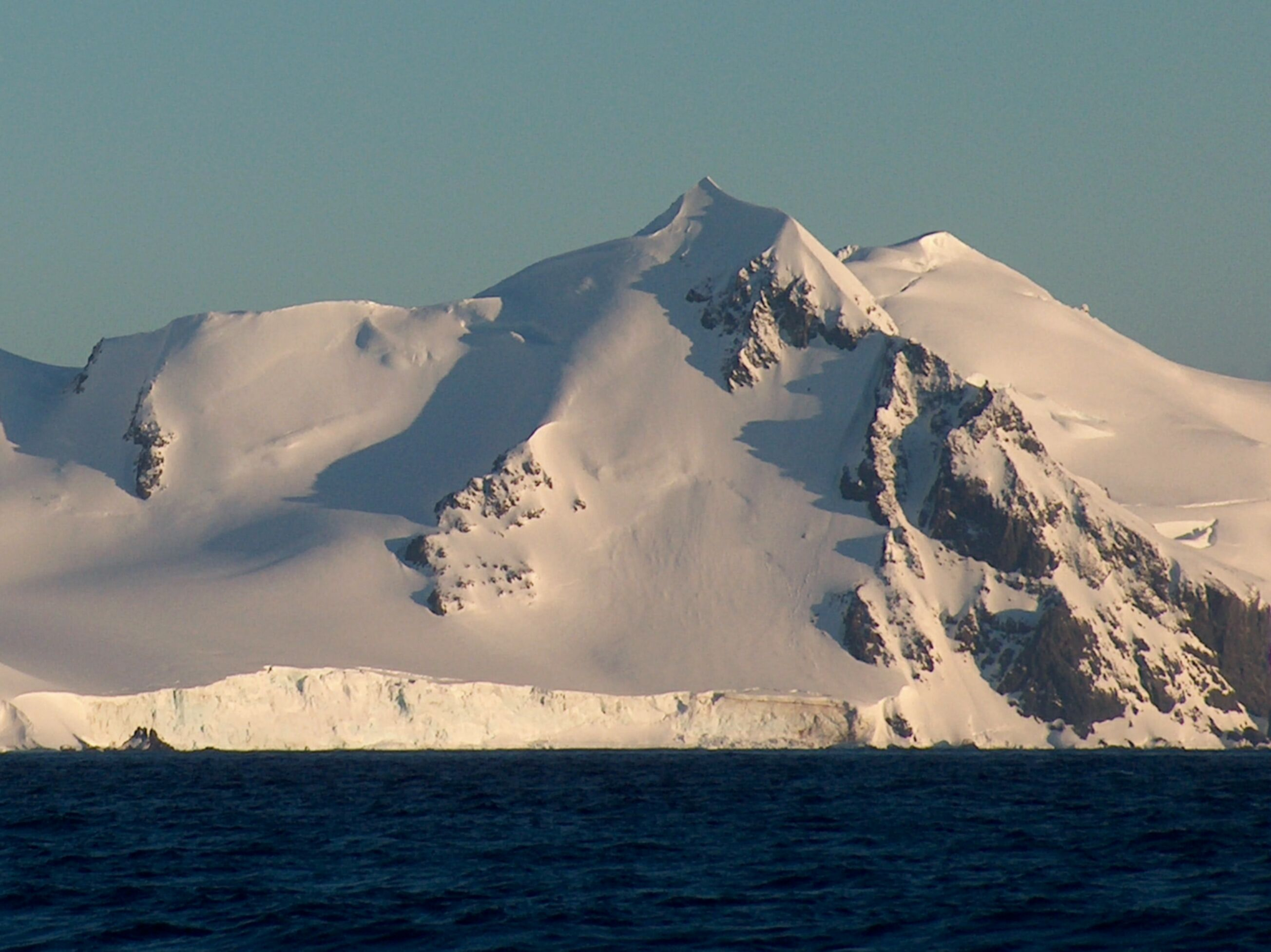
Shabla Knoll from Bransfield Strait, with Tryavna Peak in the background.

Topographic map of Livingston Island, Greenwich, Robert, Snow and Smith Islands.

Shabla Knoll (Bulgarian: връх Шабла, romanized: vrah Shabla, IPA: [ˈvrɤx ˈʃabɫɐ]) rises to over 400 m (1,312 ft) in Delchev Ridge, Tangra Mountains, Livingston Island in the South Shetland Islands, Antarctica surmounting Sopot Ice Piedmont to the north and Pautalia Glacier to the southwest.

The knoll is named after the Bulgarian town of Shabla and the nearby Shabla Point on the Black Sea coast.

== Location ==
The knoll is located at 62°37′30.7″S 59°51′04.5″W, which is 2.31 km (1 mi) east-northeast of Elena Peak, 660 m (2,165 ft) southeast of Kaloyan Nunatak, 1.05 km (1 mi) southwest of Mesta Peak and 2.91 km (2 mi) southwest of Renier Point (Bulgarian mapping in 2005 and 2009 from the Tangra 2004/05 survey).

== Maps ==
- South Shetland Islands. Scale 1:200000 topographic map No. 3373. DOS 610 – W 62 58. Tolworth, UK, 1968.
- Islas Livingston y Decepción. Mapa topográfico a escala 1:100000. Madrid: Servicio Geográfico del Ejército, 1991.
- S. Soccol, D. Gildea and J. Bath. Livingston Island, Antarctica. Scale 1:100000 satellite map. The Omega Foundation, USA, 2004.
- L.L. Ivanov et al., Antarctica: Livingston Island and Greenwich Island, South Shetland Islands (from English Strait to Morton Strait, with illustrations and ice-cover distribution), 1:100000 scale topographic map, Antarctic Place-names Commission of Bulgaria, Sofia, 2005
- L.L. Ivanov. Antarctica: Livingston Island and Greenwich, Robert, Snow and Smith Islands. Scale 1:120000 topographic map. Troyan: Manfred Wörner Foundation, 2010. ISBN 978-954-92032-9-5 (First edition 2009. ISBN 978-954-92032-6-4)
- Antarctic Digital Database (ADD). Scale 1:250000 topographic map of Antarctica. Scientific Committee on Antarctic Research (SCAR). Since 1993, regularly updated.
- L.L. Ivanov. Antarctica: Livingston Island and Smith Island. Scale 1:100000 topographic map. Manfred Wörner Foundation, 2017. ISBN 978-619-90008-3-0
