= Peter Peak =

Location of Tangra Mountains on Livingston Island in the South Shetland Islands.

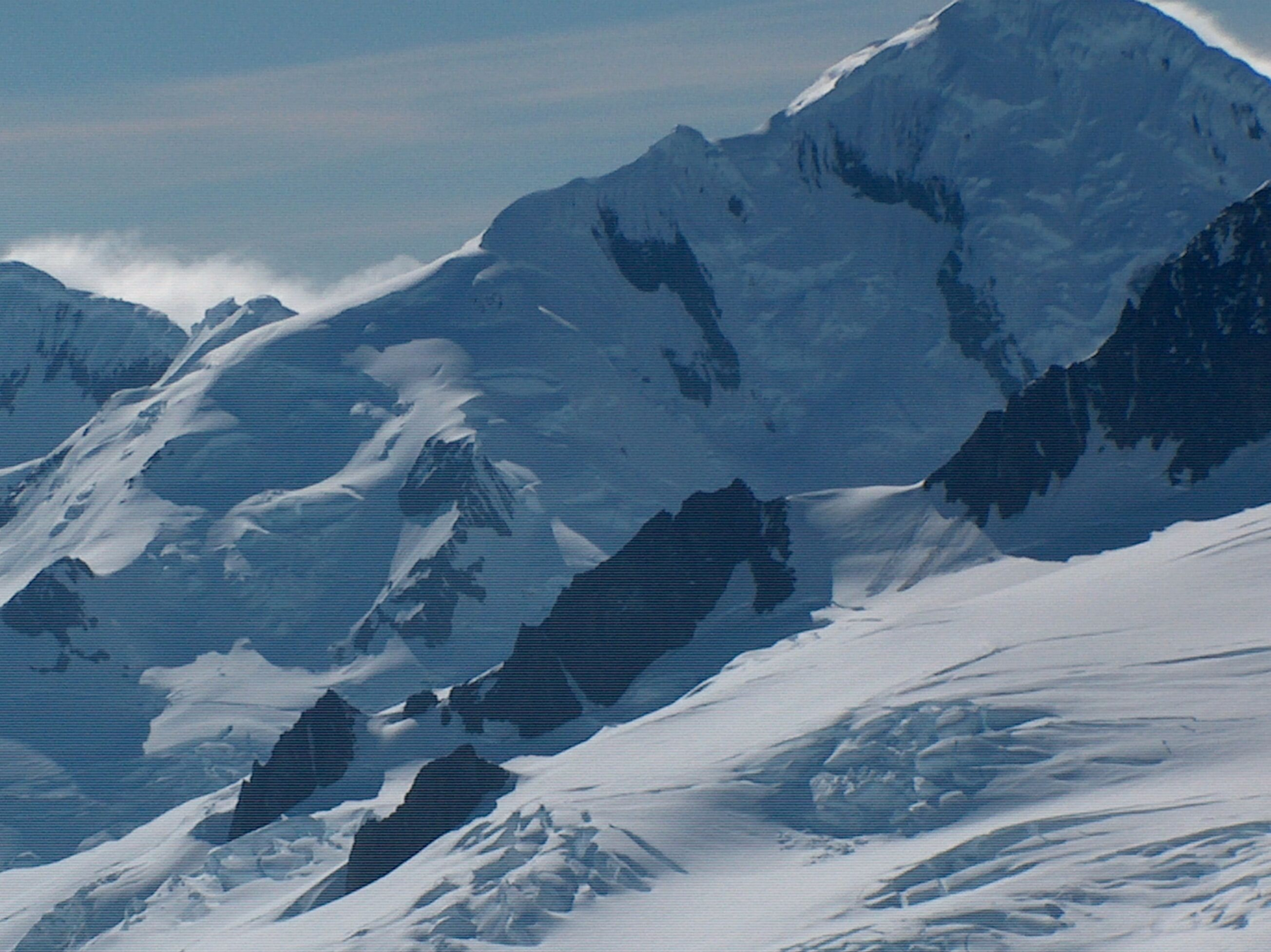
Peter Peak from Kuzman Knoll.

Topographic map of Livingston Island, Greenwich, Robert, Snow and Smith Islands.

Peter Peak (Bulgarian: Петров връх, romanized: Petrov vrah, IPA: [pɛˈtrɔv ˈvrɤx]) is an 850 m knob in Delchev Ridge, Tangra Mountains, eastern Livingston Island in the South Shetland Islands, Antarctica. The peak surmounts Iskar Glacier to the west, Bruix Cove to the northwest and Sopot Ice Piedmont to the north and east.

The peak is named after Czar Peter II (IV) of Bulgaria, 1185 - 1197 AD, who together with his brother Czar Asen I restored Bulgaria's independence to establish the Second Bulgarian Kingdom.

== Location ==
The cliff is located at 62°38′16.3″S 59°56′20″W which is 550 m northwest of Delchev Peak, 2.62 km southeast by south of Rila Point, 1.72 km south-southwest of Yavorov Peak and 1.76 km southwest of Rodopi Peak (Bulgarian mapping in 2005 and 2009).

== Maps ==
- L.L. Ivanov et al. Antarctica: Livingston Island and Greenwich Island, South Shetland Islands. Scale 1:100000 topographic map. Sofia: Antarctic Place-names Commission of Bulgaria, 2005.
- L.L. Ivanov. Antarctica: Livingston Island and Greenwich, Robert, Snow and Smith Islands. Scale 1:120000 topographic map. Troyan: Manfred Wörner Foundation, 2009. ISBN 978-954-92032-6-4
