= Spartacus Peak =

Location of Tangra Mountains on Livingston Island in the South Shetland Islands.

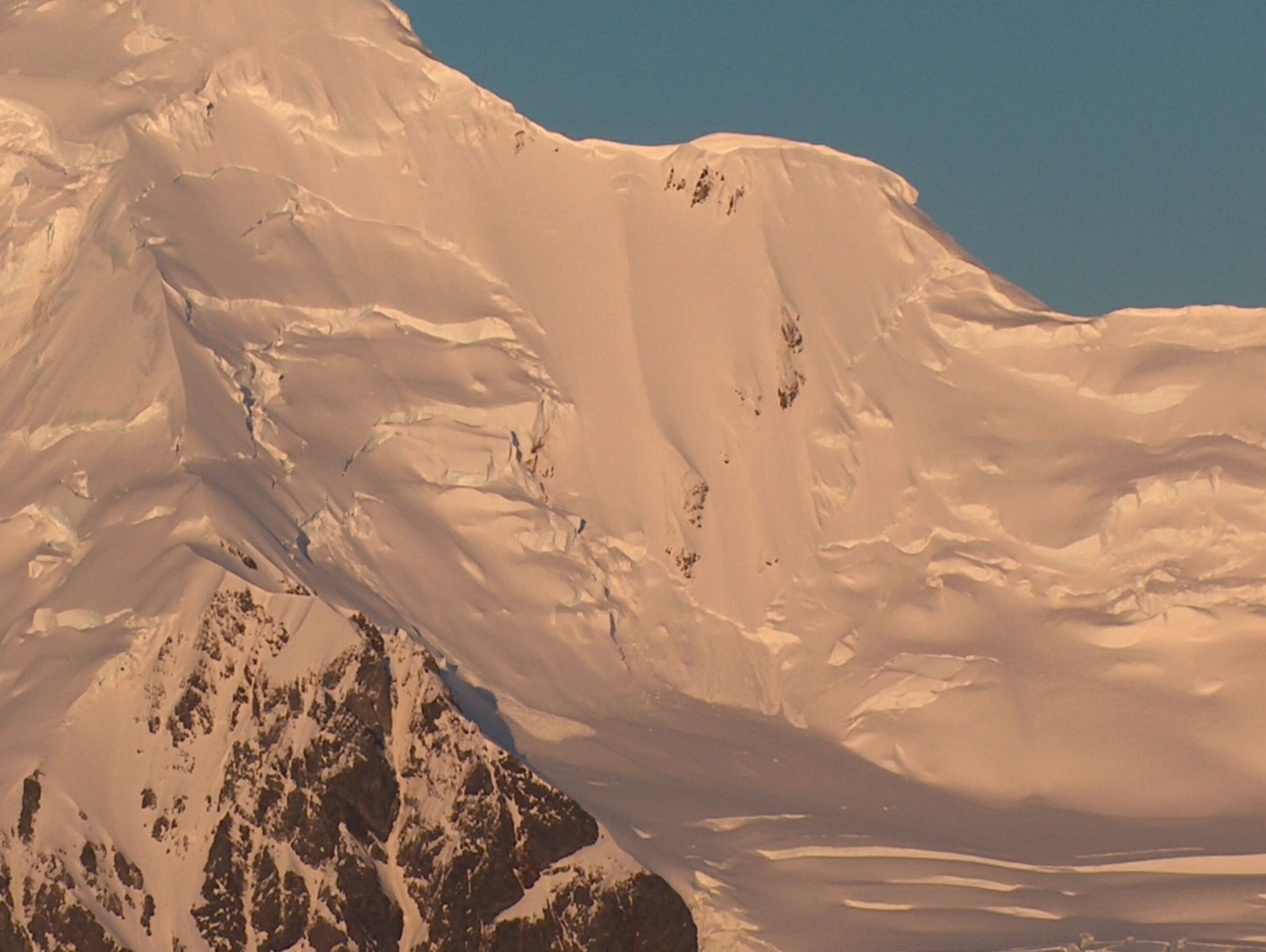
Spartakus Peak from Bransfield Strait.

Topographic map of Livingston Island, Greenwich, Robert, Snow and Smith Islands.

Spartacus Peak (Bulgarian: връх Спартак, romanized: vrah Spartak, IPA: [ˈvrɤx spɐrˈtak]) is a 650m tall ice-covered peak in Delchev Ridge, Tangra Mountains, eastern Livingston Island in the South Shetland Islands, Antarctica. The peak overlooks Sopot Ice Piedmont to the northwest and Strandzha Glacier to the east-southeast.

The peak was named after the Thracian warrior Spartacus (c. 109-71 BC) whose likely birthplace was in the Sandanski region, in south-west Bulgaria.

== Location ==
The peak is located at 62°38′19″S 59°55′00″W, which is next southwest of Trigrad Gap, 880 m east-northeast of Delchev Peak, 760 m southwest of Yavorov Peak and 1.42 km south of Rodopi Peak (Bulgarian mapping in 2005 and 2009).

== Maps ==
- L.L. Ivanov et al. Antarctica: Livingston Island and Greenwich Island, South Shetland Islands. Scale 1:100000 topographic map. Sofia: Antarctic Place-names Commission of Bulgaria, 2005.
- L.L. Ivanov. Antarctica: Livingston Island and Greenwich, Robert, Snow and Smith Islands. Scale 1:120000 topographic map. Troyan: Manfred Wörner Foundation, 2009. ISBN 978-954-92032-6-4
