= Besapara Hill =

Location of Tangra Mountains on Livingston Island in the South Shetland Islands.

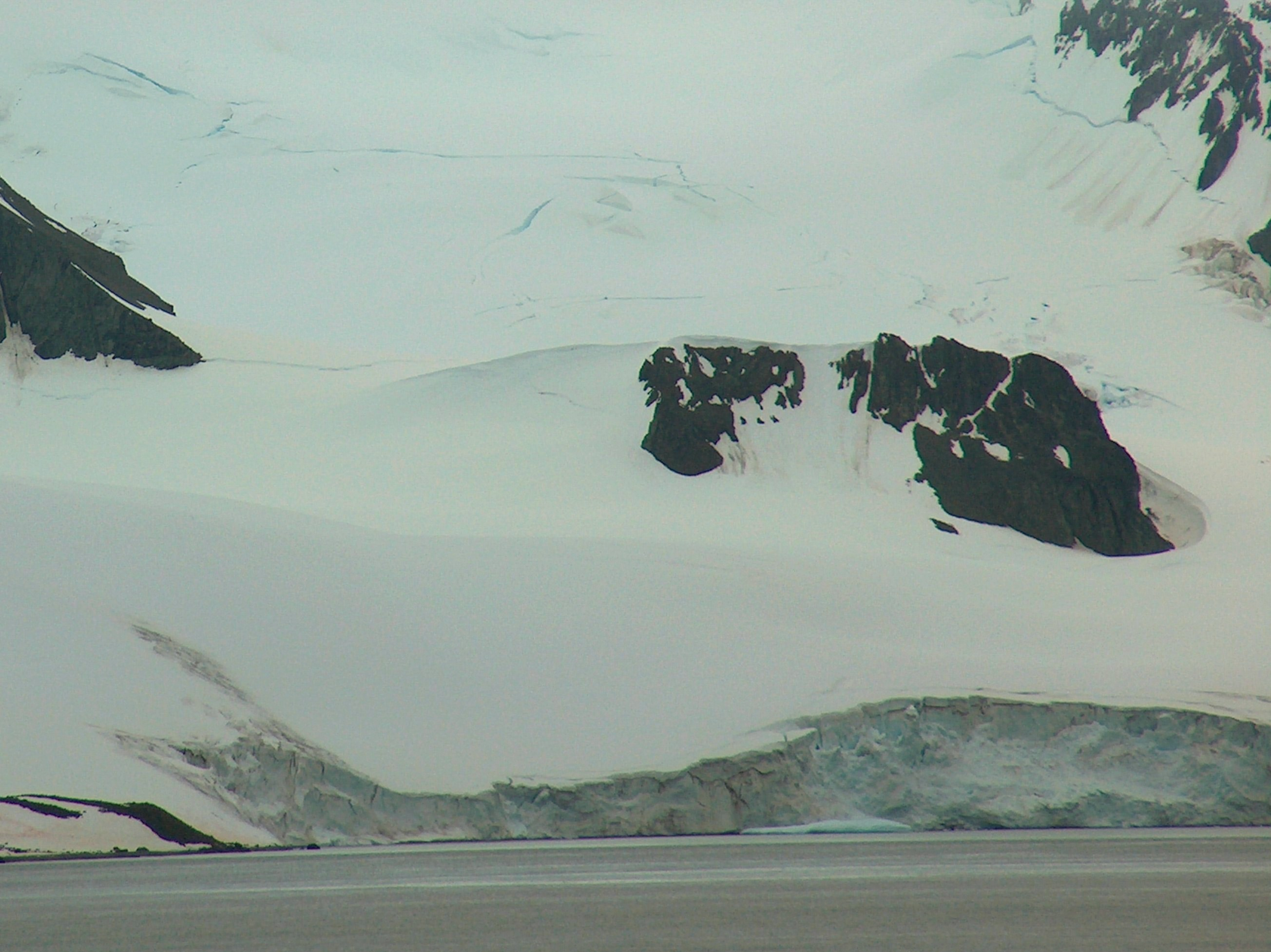
Besapara Hill

Topographic map of Livingston Island, Greenwich, Robert, Snow and Smith Islands.

Besapara Hill (Halm Besapara \'h&lm be-sa-'pa-ra\) is a hill of 250m projecting from Sopot Ice Piedmont in Delchev Ridge, Tangra Mountains on Livingston Island, South Shetland Islands in Antarctica. The hill was mapped in the Bulgarian topographic survey Tangra 2004/05, and is named after the ancient Thracian town of Besapara, ancestor of the present Bulgarian city of Pazardzhik.

== Location ==
The hill is located at 62°37′10″S 59°52′02″W which is 500m north of Kaloyan Nunatak, 2 km east of Vaptsarov Peak and 1.5 km west of Mesta Peak.

== Maps ==
- L.L. Ivanov et al. Antarctica: Livingston Island and Greenwich Island, South Shetland Islands. Scale 1:100000 topographic map. Sofia: Antarctic Place-names Commission of Bulgaria, 2005.
- L.L. Ivanov. Antarctica: Livingston Island and Greenwich, Robert, Snow and Smith Islands. Scale 1:120000 topographic map. Troyan: Manfred Wörner Foundation, 2009.
