= Mesta Peak =

Rocky peak in the South Shetland Islands, Antarctica

Location of Tangra Mountains on Livingston Island in the South Shetland Islands.

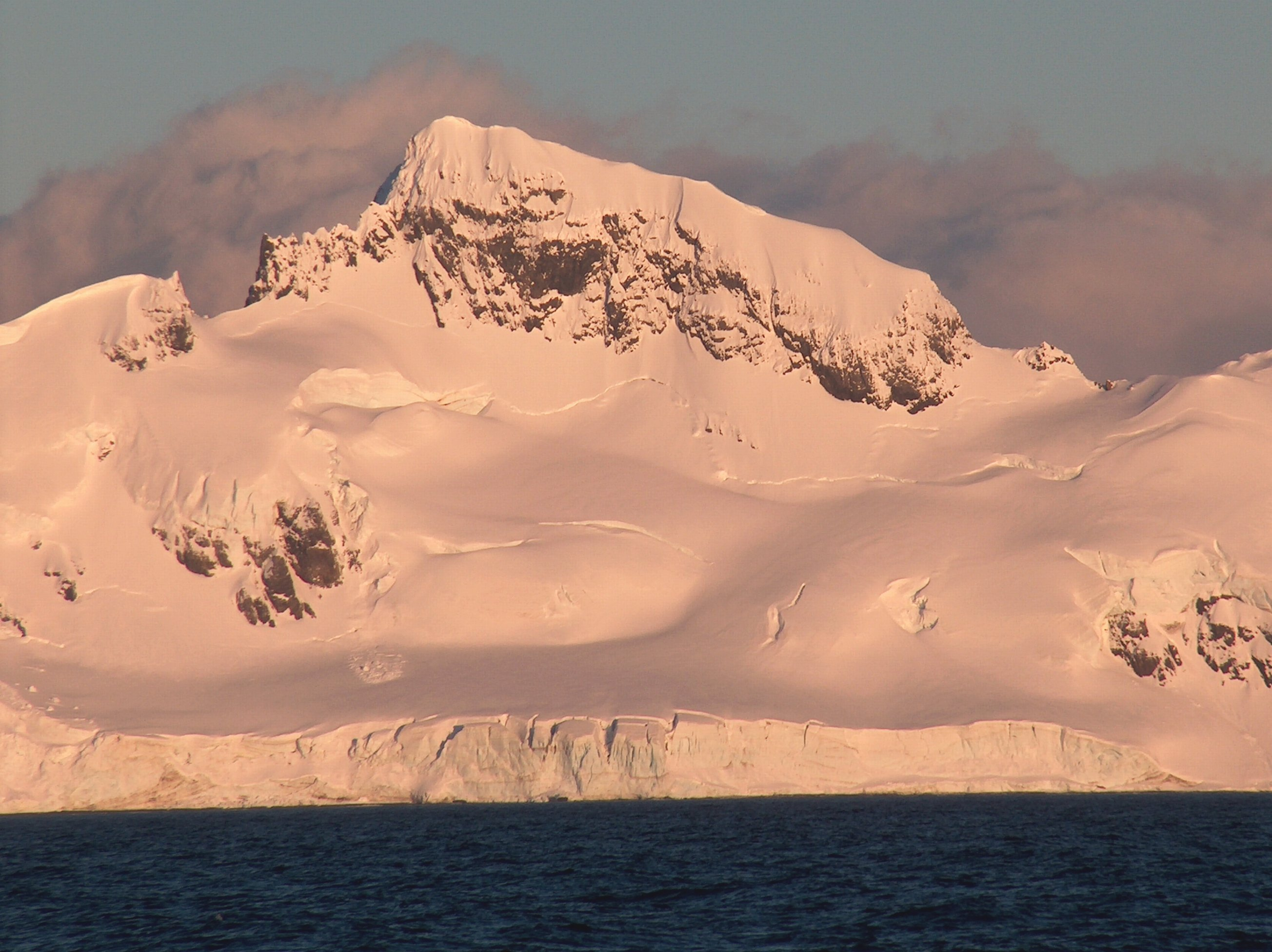
Mesta Peak from Bransfield Strait.

Topographic map of Livingston Island

Mesta Peak (Bulgarian: връх Места, romanized: vrah Mesta, IPA: [ˈvrɤx ˈmɛstɐ]) is a conspicuous, sharp and narrow rocky peak extending 500 m in east-west direction and rising to approximately 400 m in Delchev Ridge, Tangra Mountains, eastern Livingston Island in the South Shetland Islands, Antarctica. The peak has steep and ice-free slopes and surmounts the east extremity of Sopot Ice Piedmont to the north.

The peak is named after the Mesta River in Bulgaria.

== Location ==
The peak is located at 62°37′10.9″S 59°50′04.5″W, which is 1.53 km east-northeast of Kaloyan Nunatak, 1.5 km east of Besapara Hill, 1.05 km northeast of Shabla Knoll and 1.86 km southwest of Renier Point.

== Maps ==
- L.L. Ivanov et al. Antarctica: Livingston Island and Greenwich Island, South Shetland Islands. Scale 1:100000 topographic map. Sofia: Antarctic Place-names Commission of Bulgaria, 2005.
- L.L. Ivanov. Antarctica: Livingston Island and Greenwich, Robert, Snow and Smith Islands. Scale 1:120000 topographic map. Troyan: Manfred Wörner Foundation, 2009. ISBN 978-954-92032-6-4
- Antarctic Digital Database (ADD). Scale 1:250000 topographic map of Antarctica. Scientific Committee on Antarctic Research (SCAR). Since 1993, regularly upgraded and updated.
- L.L. Ivanov. Antarctica: Livingston Island and Smith Island. Scale 1:100000 topographic map. Manfred Wörner Foundation, 2017. ISBN 978-619-90008-3-0
