= Paisiy Peak =

Mountain in Antarctica

Location of Tangra Mountains on Livingston Island in the South Shetland Islands

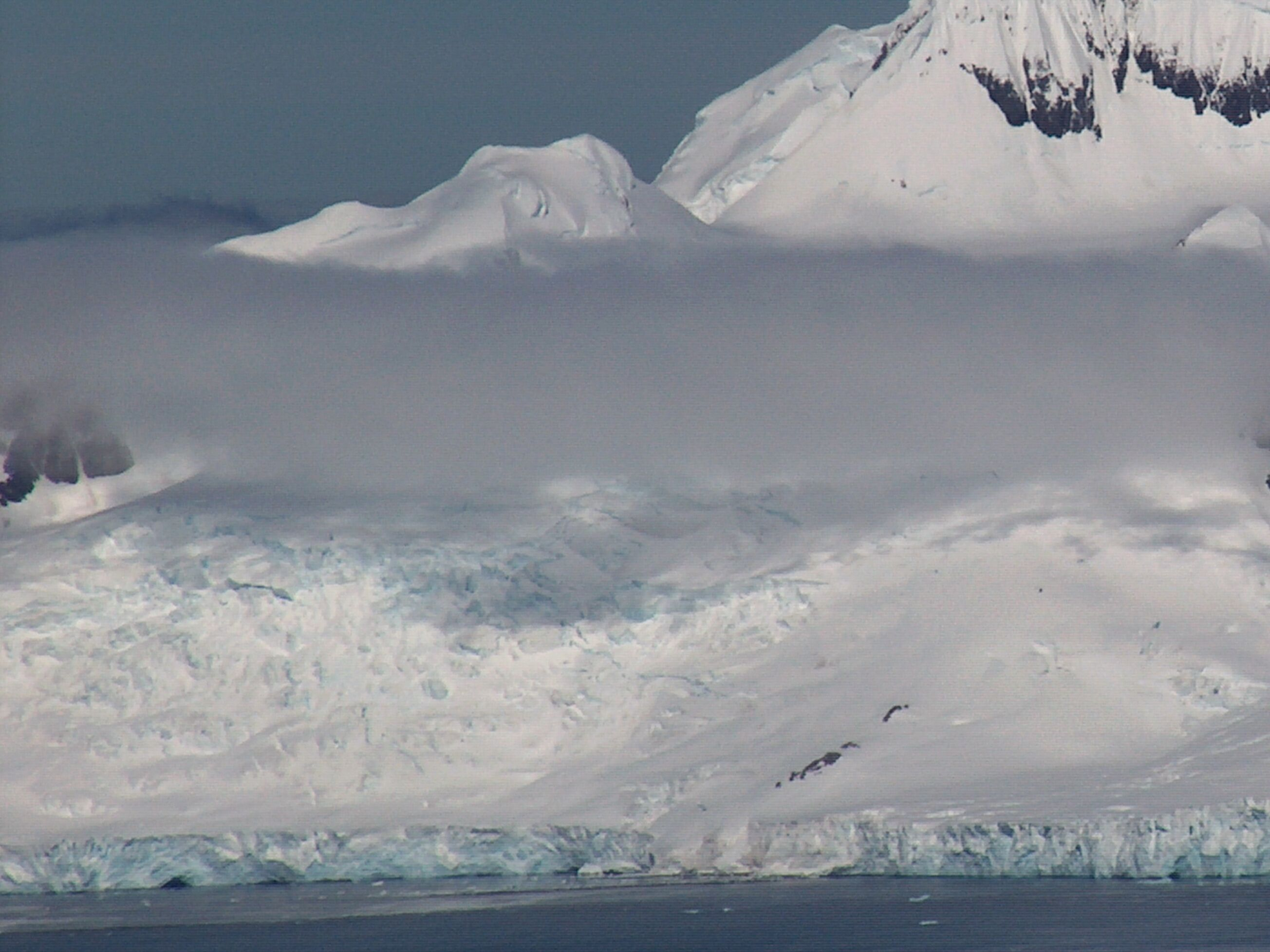
Paisiy Peak from Miziya Peak

Topographic map of Livingston Island and Smith Island

Paisiy Peak (Bulgarian: връх Паисий, romanized: vrah Paisiy, IPA: [ˈvrɤx pɐˈisij]) rises to approximately 550 m in the Delchev Ridge, Tangra Mountains, eastern Livingston Island in the South Shetland Islands, Antarctica surmounting Sopot Ice Piedmont to the north and east.

The peak is named after St. Paisiy Hilendarski (St. Paisius of Chilendar, 1722–73), a famous figure of the Bulgarian National Revival, and author of the book ‘Slavonic-Bulgarian History: On the People, Bulgarian Czars and Saints, and All Bulgarian Deeds and Events’.

== Location ==
The peak is located at 62°37′31.3″S 59°53′49.5″W which is 600 m north by west of Elena Peak, 5.03 km west-southwest of Renier Point and 3.9 km east by south of Rila Point (Bulgarian mapping in 2005 and 2009).

== Maps ==
- L.L. Ivanov et al. Antarctica: Livingston Island and Greenwich Island, South Shetland Islands. Scale 1:100000 topographic map. Sofia: Antarctic Place-names Commission of Bulgaria, 2005.
- L.L. Ivanov. Antarctica: Livingston Island and Greenwich, Robert, Snow and Smith Islands. Scale 1:120000 topographic map. Troyan: Manfred Wörner Foundation, 2009. ISBN 978-954-92032-6-4
- L.L. Ivanov. Antarctica: Livingston Island and Smith Island. Scale 1:100000 topographic map. Manfred Wörner Foundation, 2017. ISBN 978-619-90008-3-0
