= Ghiaurov Peak =

Peak in the Tangra Mountains, Antarctica

Location of Tangra Mountains on Livingston Island in the South Shetland Islands.

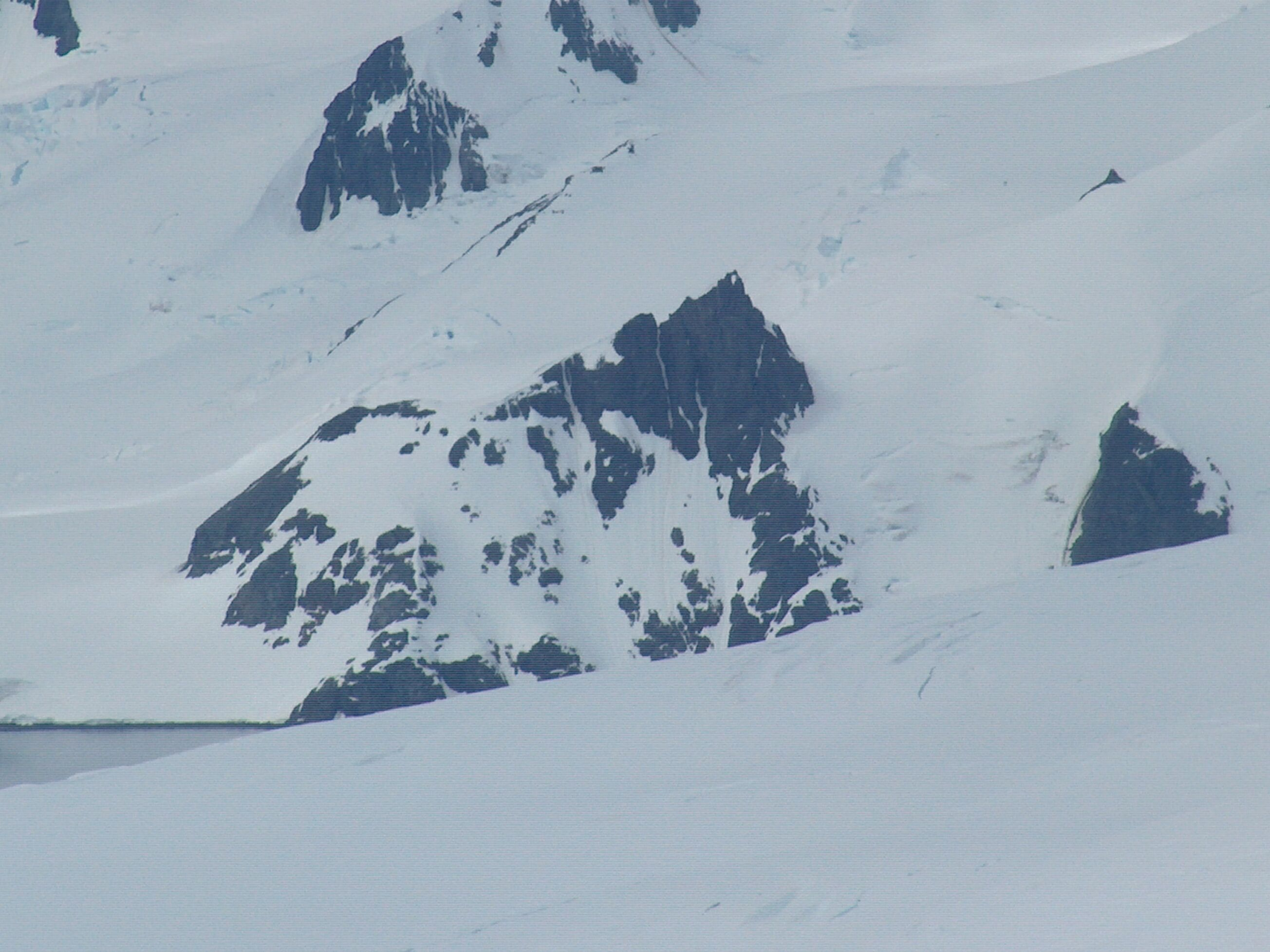
Ghiaurov Peak from Kuzman Knoll.

Topographic map of Livingston Island and Smith Island.

Ghiaurov Peak (Bulgarian: Гяуров връх, romanized: Gyaurov vrah, IPA: [ɟɐˈurov ˈvrɤx]) is a rocky 250 m peak in Delchev Ridge, Tangra Mountains on Livingston Island in the South Shetland Islands, Antarctica. The peak is named after the famous Bulgarian singer Nicolai Ghiaurov (1929–2004).

== Location ==
The peak is located at 62°37′40″S 59°57′49″W, which is 960 m south-southeast of Rila Point, 650 m north-northwest of Kazanlak Peak and 2.19 km north-northwest of Delchev Peak (Bulgarian mapping in 2005 and 2009 from the Tangra 2004/05 topographic survey).

== Map ==
- L.L. Ivanov. Antarctica: Livingston Island and Greenwich, Robert, Snow and Smith Islands. Scale 1:120000 topographic map. Troyan: Manfred Wörner Foundation, 2009. ISBN 978-954-92032-6-4
