= Rodopi Peak =

Location of Tangra Mountains on Livingston Island in the South Shetland Islands.

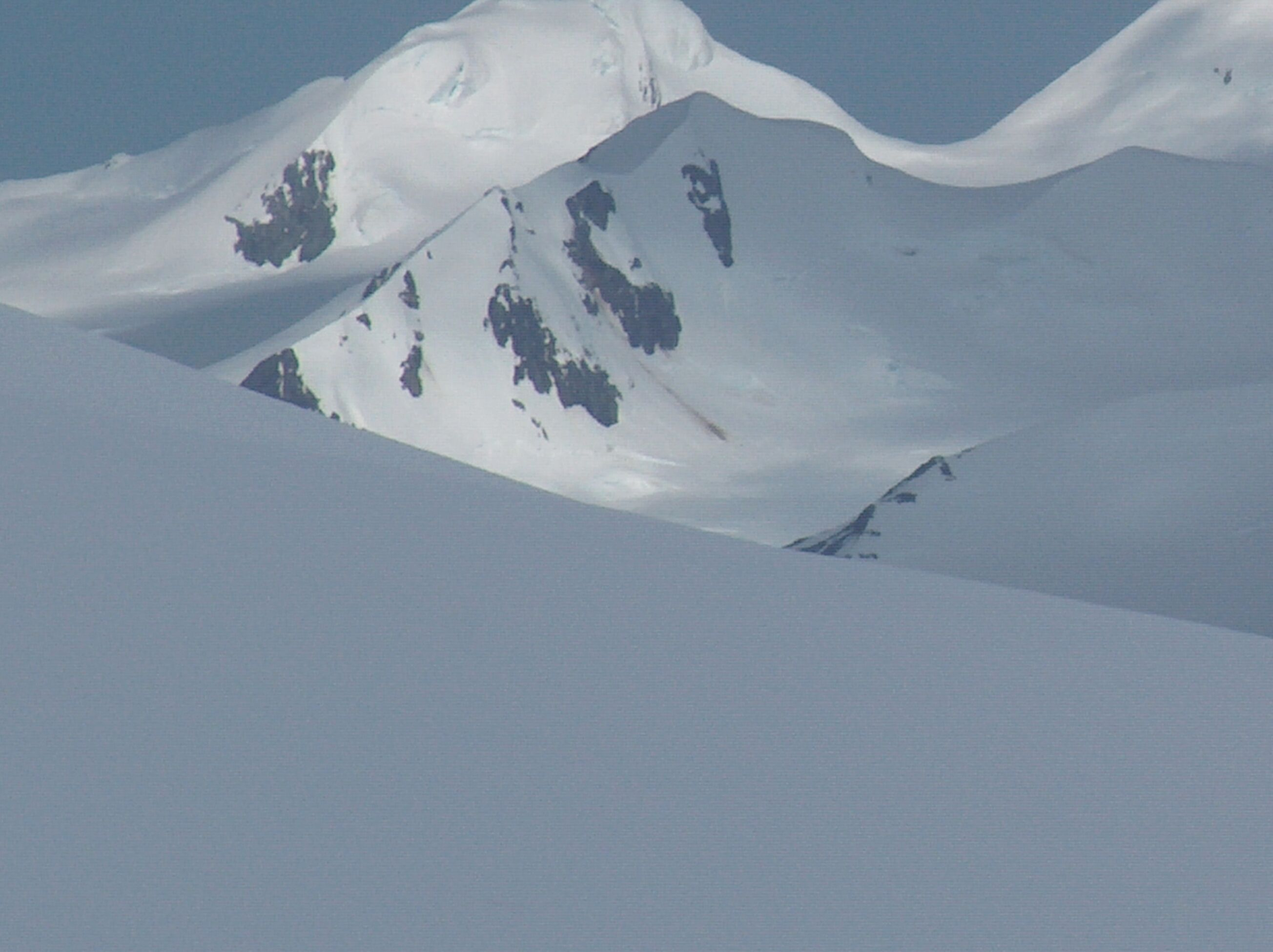
Rodopi Peak from the southern foothills of Petrich Peak.

Topographic map of Livingston Island, Greenwich, Robert, Snow and Smith Islands.

Rodopi Peak (Bulgarian: връх Родопи, romanized: vrah Rodopi, IPA: [ˈvrɤx roˈdɔpi]) is an ice-covered peak rising to approximately 500 m in Delchev Ridge, Tangra Mountains, eastern Livingston Islandin the South Shetland Islands, Antarctica.

The peak is named after Rodopi (Rhodope) Mountains in Bulgaria and Greece.

== Location ==
The peak is located at 62°37′33.2″S 59°54′59″W, which is 2.94 km east-southeast of Rila Point, 1.92 km north-northwest of Delchev Peak, 1 km northwest by north of Yavorov Peak and 990 m west of Paisiy Peak. Surmounting Sopot Ice Piedmont to the west and north (Bulgarian mapping in 2005 and 2009).

== Maps ==
- L.L. Ivanov et al. Antarctica: Livingston Island and Greenwich Island, South Shetland Islands. Scale 1:100000 topographic map. Sofia: Antarctic Place-names Commission of Bulgaria, 2005.
- L.L. Ivanov. Antarctica: Livingston Island and Greenwich, Robert, Snow and Smith Islands. Scale 1:120000 topographic map. Troyan: Manfred Wörner Foundation, 2009. ISBN 978-954-92032-6-4
