= Strandzha Glacier =

Glacier in Antarctica

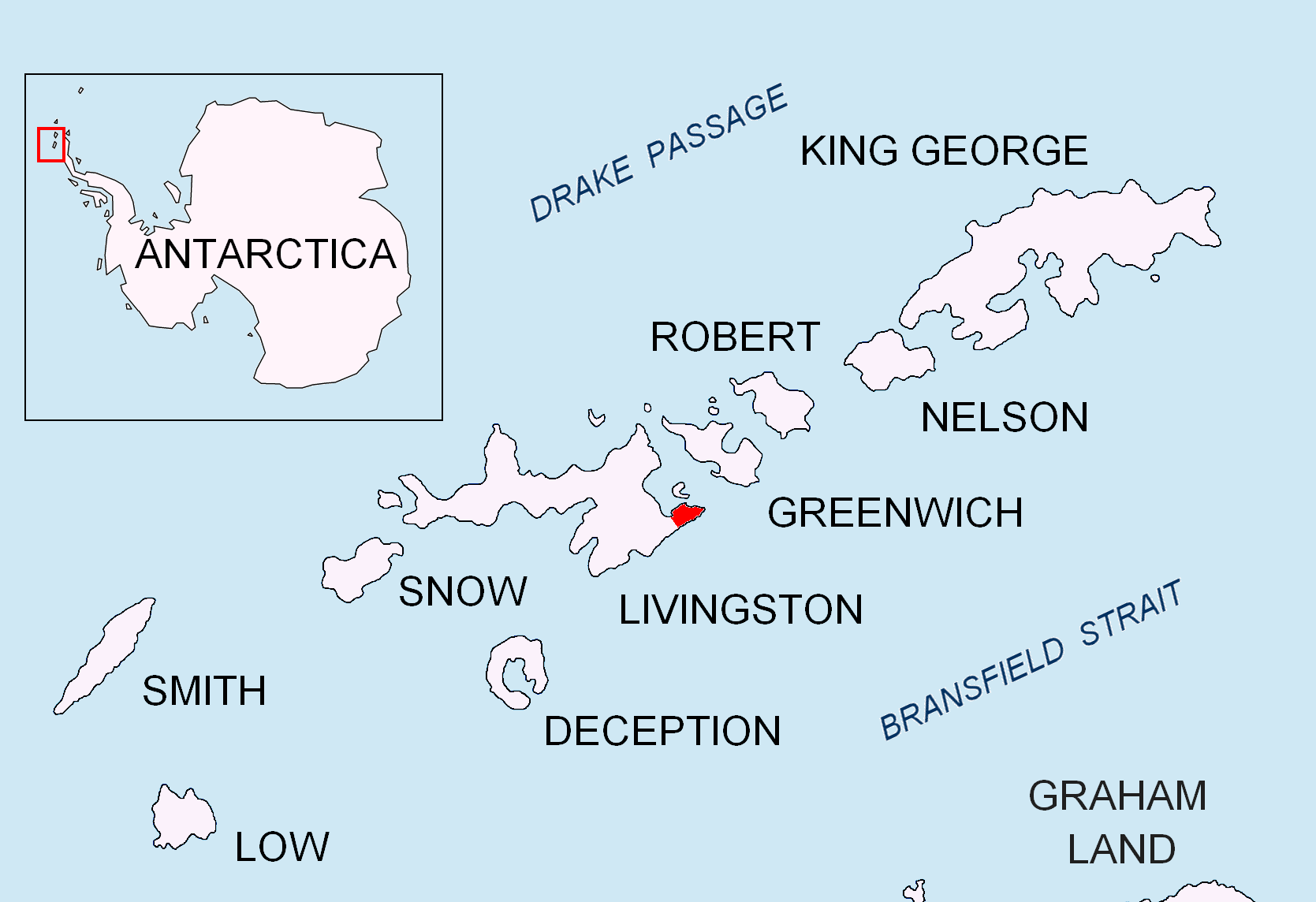
- Location of Burgas Peninsula on Livingston Island in the South Shetland Islands

- Location within South Shetland Islands Location within Antarctica
- Location: Livingston Island; South Shetland Islands
- Coordinates: 62°38′20″S 59°54′00″W
- Length: 0.9 nautical miles (1.7 km; 1.0 mi)
- Width: 0.4 nautical miles (0.74 km; 0.46 mi)
- Thickness: unknown
- Terminus: Bransfield Strait
- Status: unknown

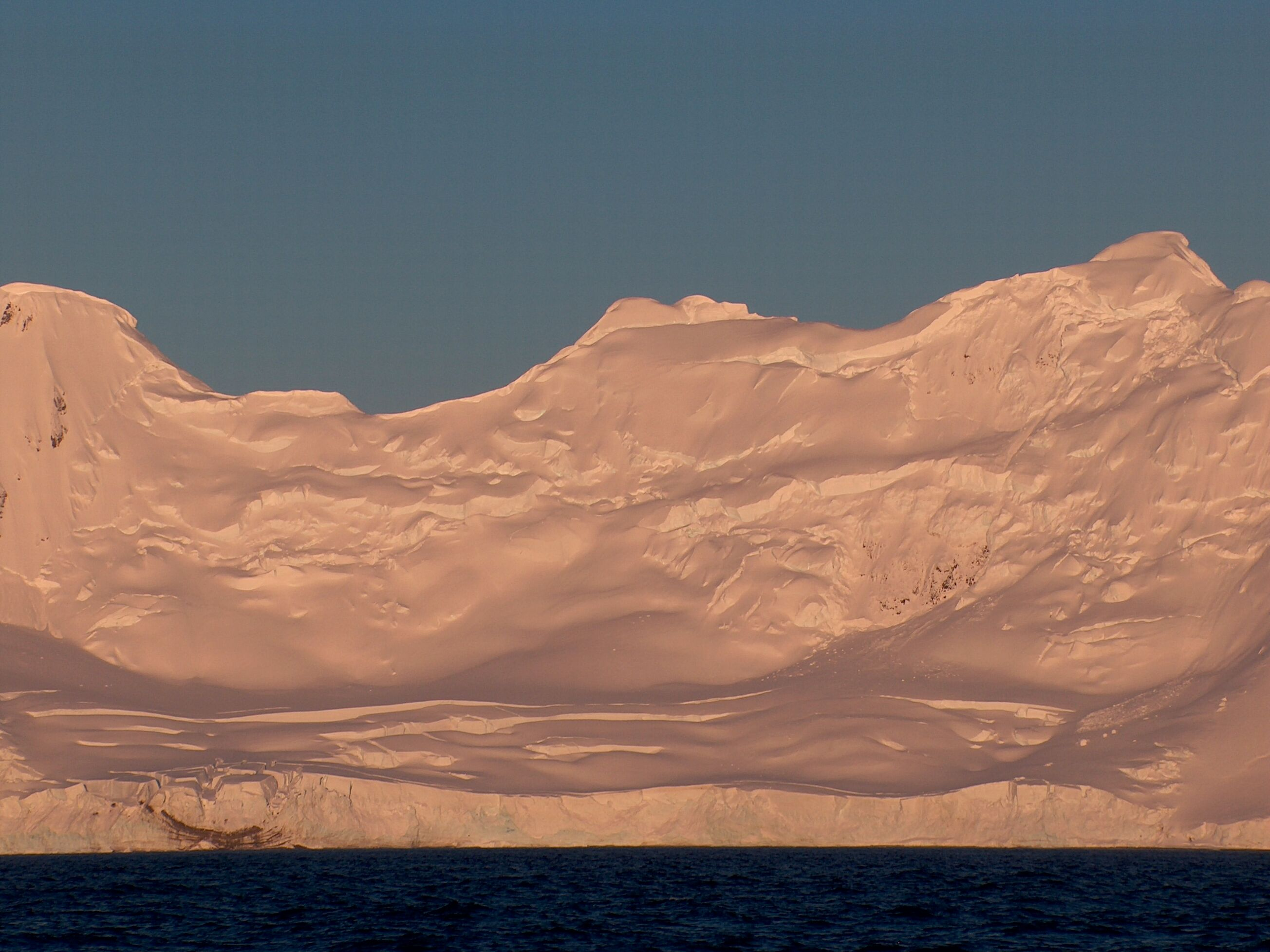
Strandzha Glacier from Bransfield Strait, with Spartacus Peak, Yavorov Peak and Elena Peak in the background.

Topographic map of Livingston Island and Smith Island

Strandzha Glacier (Bulgarian: ледник Странджа, romanized: lednik Strandzha, IPA: [ˈlɛdnik ˈstrand͡ʒɐ]) is located on Burgas Peninsula, eastern Livingston Island in the South Shetland Islands, Antarctica northeast of Ropotamo Glacier, south of Sopot Ice Piedmont and southwest of Pautalia Glacier. It is bounded by Delchev Peak to the west, Spartacus Peak, Trigrad Gap and Yavorov Peak to the northwest, and by Elena Peak to the north, extends 1.6 km in northeast–southwest direction and 800 m in northwest–southeast direction, and flows southeastward into Bransfield Strait.

The feature is named after Strandzha Mountain, Bulgaria.

== Location ==
Strandzha Glacier is centred at 62°38′20″S 59°54′00″W. Bulgarian mapping in 2005 and 2009.

== See also ==
- List of glaciers in the Antarctic
- Glaciology

== Maps ==
- L.L. Ivanov et al. Antarctica: Livingston Island and Greenwich Island, South Shetland Islands. Scale 1:100000 topographic map. Sofia: Antarctic Place-names Commission of Bulgaria, 2005.
- L.L. Ivanov. Antarctica: Livingston Island and Greenwich, Robert, Snow and Smith Islands. Scale 1:120000 topographic map. Troyan: Manfred Wörner Foundation, 2009. ISBN 978-954-92032-6-4
