= Yavorov Peak =

Peak in Antarctica

Location of Tangra Mountains on Livingston Island in the South Shetland Islands.

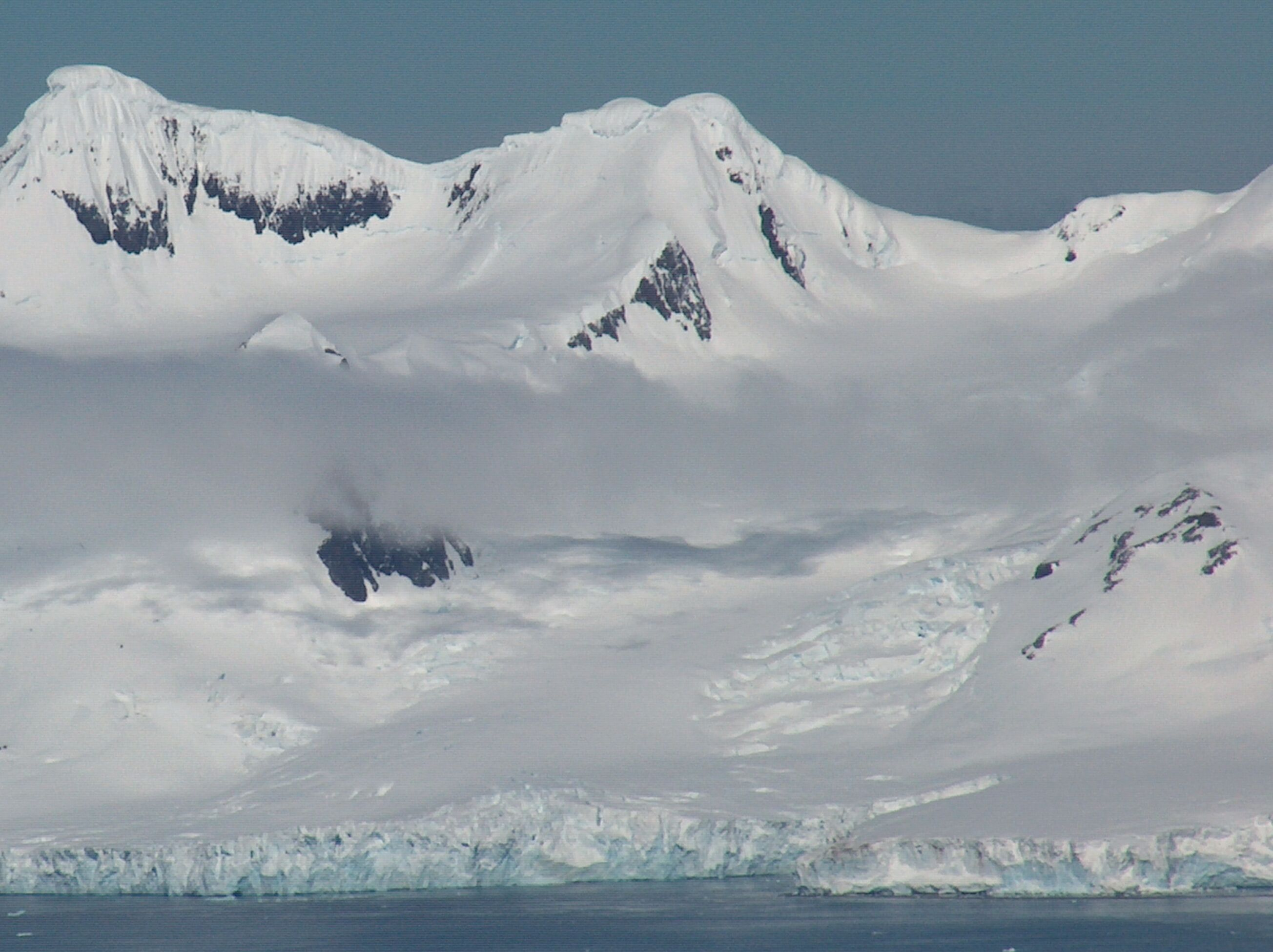
Yavorov Peak from Miziya Peak, with Elena Peak on the left.

Topographic map of Livingston Island and Smith Island.

Yavorov Peak (Bulgarian: Яворов връх, romanized: Yavorov vrah, IPA: [ˈjavorov ˈvrɤx]) is an ice-covered peak of elevation 640 m in the Delchev Ridge of the Tangra Mountains on eastern Livingston Island in the South Shetland Islands, Antarctica. The peak surmounts Sopot Ice Piedmont to the north and west, and Strandzha Glacier to the southeast. The feature was named after the famous Bulgarian poet Peyo Yavorov (1878–1914).

== Location ==
The peak is located at 62°38′01″S 59°54′24″W, which is next northeast of the Trigrad Gap, 1.6 km northeast of Delchev Peak, 760 m northeast of Spartacus Peak. 1 km south-southeast of Rodopi Peak and 690 m west-southwest of Elena Peak (Bulgarian survey Tangra 2004/05 and mapping in 2005 and 2009).

== Maps ==
- L.L. Ivanov et al. Antarctica: Livingston Island and Greenwich Island, South Shetland Islands. Scale 1:100000 topographic map. Sofia: Antarctic Place-names Commission of Bulgaria, 2005.
- L.L. Ivanov. Antarctica: Livingston Island and Greenwich, Robert, Snow and Smith Islands. Scale 1:120000 topographic map. Troyan: Manfred Wörner Foundation, 2009. ISBN 978-954-92032-6-4
- L.L. Ivanov. Antarctica: Livingston Island and Greenwich, Robert, Snow and Smith Islands. Scale 1:120000 topographic map. Troyan: Manfred Wörner Foundation, 2010. ISBN 978-954-92032-9-5 (First edition 2009. ISBN 978-954-92032-6-4)
- Antarctic Digital Database (ADD). Scale 1:250000 topographic map of Antarctica. Scientific Committee on Antarctic Research (SCAR). Since 1993, regularly upgraded and updated.
- L.L. Ivanov. Antarctica: Livingston Island and Smith Island. Scale 1:100000 topographic map. Manfred Wörner Foundation, 2017. ISBN 978-619-90008-3-0
