= Nicolai Ghiaurov =

Bulgarian opera singer (1929–2004)

- Nicolai Ghiaurov (photo with 1960 dedication)
- Born: September 13, 1929; Velingrad, Bulgaria
- Died: June 2, 2004 (aged 74); Modena, Italy
- Occupation: Opera singer (bass)
- Spouses: Zlatina Mishakova (m. 1956; div. 1977) Mirella Freni (m. 1978)

Nicolai Ghiaurov (or Nikolai Gjaurov, Nikolay Gyaurov, Bulgarian: Николай Гяуров; September 13, 1929 – June 2, 2004) was a Bulgarian opera singer and one of the most famous basses of the postwar period. He was admired for his powerful, sumptuous voice, and was particularly associated with roles of Mussorgsky and Verdi. Ghiaurov married the Bulgarian pianist Zlatina Mishakova in 1956 and Italian soprano Mirella Freni in 1978, and the two singers frequently performed together. They lived in Modena until Ghiaurov's death in 2004 of a heart attack.

== Biography ==
Ghiaurov was born in the small mountain town of Velingrad in southern Bulgaria. As a child, he learned to play the violin, piano and clarinet. He began his musical studies at the Bulgarian State Conservatory in 1949 where he studied under Prof. Cristo Brambarov. Ghiaurov was awarded a state scholarship and from 1950 until 1955 he studied at the Moscow Conservatory.

Ghiaurov's career was launched in 1955, when he won the Grand Prix at the International Vocal Competition in Paris and the First Prize and a gold medal at the Fifth World Youth Festival in Warsaw. Ghiaurov made his operatic debut in 1955 as Don Basilio in Rossini's The Barber of Seville in Sofia. In 1956 he moved to the Bolshoi Theater in Moscow, singing his first Mephistopheles. He made his Italian operatic debut in 1958 in Teatro Comunale Bologna, before starting an international career with his rendition of Varlaam in the opera Boris Godunov at La Scala in 1959. 1962 marked Ghiaurov's Covent Garden debut as Padre Guardiano in Verdi's La forza del destino as well as his first appearance in Salzburg in Verdi's Requiem, conducted by Herbert von Karajan.

Ghiaurov first shared a stage with Mirella Freni in 1961 in Genoa. She was Marguerite, he was Mephistopheles in Faust. Married in 1978, they lived in her hometown, Modena. They sang together frequently.

He made his US debut in Gounod's Faust in 1963 at the Lyric Opera of Chicago, and he went on to sing twelve roles with the company, including the title roles in Boris Godunov, Don Quichotte, and Mefistofele.

Ghiaurov made his Metropolitan Opera debut on 8 November 1965 as Mefistofele. He sang a total of 81 performances in ten roles there, last appearing there on October 26, 1996, as Sparafucile in Rigoletto. During the course of his career, he also performed at Moscow's Bolshoi Theatre, the Vienna State Opera, Covent Garden, and Paris Opéra.

In the late 1970s Ghiaurov sang the title role in the first complete stereo recording of Massenet's opera Don Quichotte. He was recorded frequently, and his discography includes complete recordings of many of his great stage roles, including Don Giovanni, Don Basilio, Ramfis, Colline, Banco, Gounod's and Boito's Mephistos and Boris Godunov, among many others.

Ghiaurov and his wife Mirella Freni sang together in many operas, more notable ones being Simon Boccanegra (La Scala, 1971), Faust (Covent Garden, 1976), Don Carlos (Salzburg, 1976), Ernani (La Scala, 1982).

In October 2000, at the age of 71, he gave an acclaimed performance at the 1st Herbert von Karajan Memorial concert under the baton of James Allen Gähres in Ulm, where he sang opera arias and duets by Cilea, Tchaikovsky and Verdi, together with Mirella Freni.

In Ghiaurov's obituary in Opera News, Martin Bernheimer remarked: "He commanded a remarkable vocal instrument, strikingly generous in size, warm in timbre, dark in color. He rolled out the resonant tone at his command with generosity, and with special ease at the burnished top."

== Videography ==
- The Metropolitan Opera Centennial Gala (1983), Deutsche Grammophon DVD, 00440-073-4538, 2009
- The Metropolitan Opera Gala 1991, Deutsche Grammophon DVD, 00440-073-4582, 2010

== Honour ==
Ghiaurov Peak on Livingston Island in the South Shetland Islands, Antarctica is named after Nicolai Ghiaurov.
