= Trigrad Gap =

Saddle in the South Shetland Islands, Antarctica

Location of Tangra Mountains on Livingston Island in the South Shetland Islands.

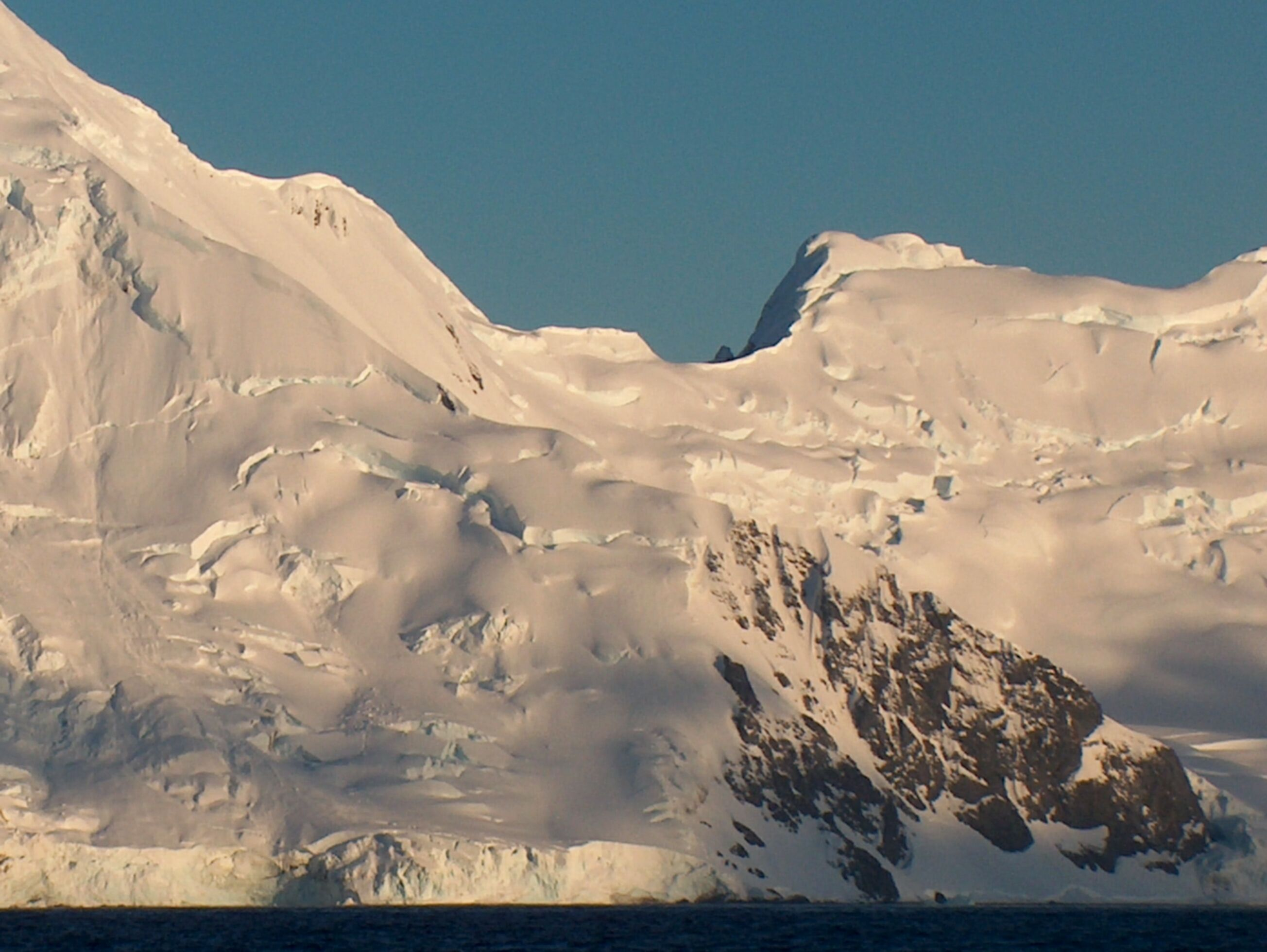
Trigrad Gap from Bransfield Strait, with Yavorov Peak on the right.

Topographic map of Livingston Island and Smith Island

Trigrad Gap (Trigradska Sedlovina \tri-'grad-ska se-dlo-vi-'na\) is a saddle of 500 m height in the Delchev Ridge in the Tangra Mountains of eastern Livingston Island in the South Shetland Islands, Antarctica. The gap is bounded to the southwest by Spartacus Peak and to the northeast by Yavorov Peak. The feature is named after the Bulgarian village of Trigrad.

== Location ==
The midpoint of the gap is located at 62°38′10.9″S 59°54′39″W.

== Maps ==
- L.L. Ivanov et al. Antarctica: Livingston Island and Greenwich Island, South Shetland Islands. Scale 1:100000 topographic map. Sofia: Antarctic Place-names Commission of Bulgaria, 2005.
- L.L. Ivanov. Antarctica: Livingston Island and Greenwich, Robert, Snow and Smith Islands. Scale 1:120000 topographic map. Troyan: Manfred Wörner Foundation, 2010. ISBN 978-954-92032-9-5 (First edition 2009. ISBN 978-954-92032-6-4)
- Antarctic Digital Database (ADD). Scale 1:250000 topographic map of Antarctica. Scientific Committee on Antarctic Research (SCAR). Since 1993, regularly updated.
- L.L. Ivanov. Antarctica: Livingston Island and Smith Island. Scale 1:100000 topographic map. Manfred Wörner Foundation, 2017. ISBN 978-619-90008-3-0
