= Ihtiman Hook =

Landform in the South Shetland Islands, Antarctica

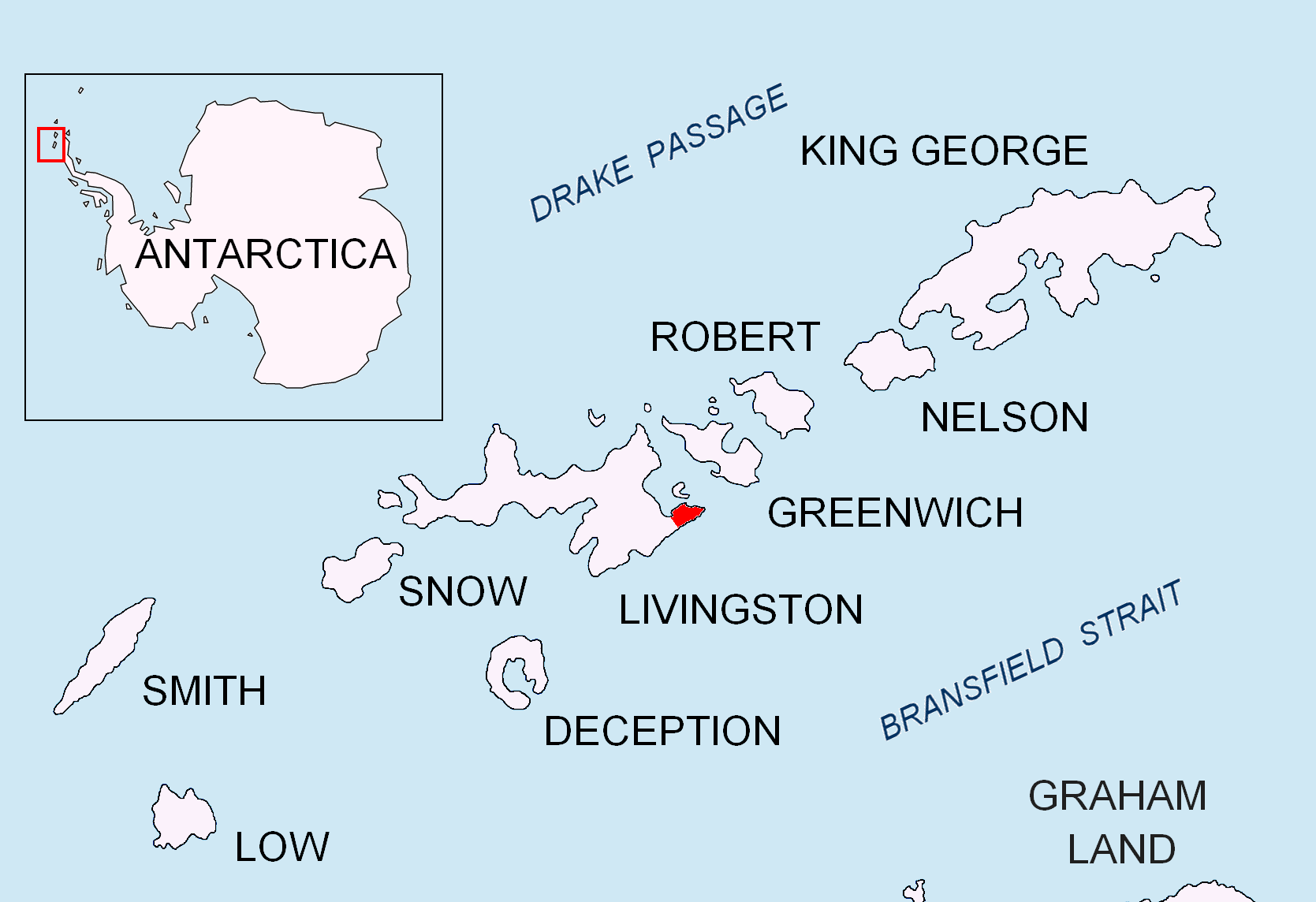
Location of Burgas Peninsula on Livingston Island in the South Shetland Islands.

Topographic map of Livingston Island, Greenwich, Robert, Snow and Smith Islands.

Ihtiman Hook (Bulgarian: Ихтиманска коса, ‘Ihtimanska Kosa’ \ih-ti-'man-ska ko-'sa\) is a gravel barrier spit extending 700 m westward from the north coast of Burgas Peninsula on Livingston Island in the South Shetland Islands, Antarctica. Situated 2.8 km east-northeast of Rila Point, 5.9 km west of Renier Point, and 1.5 km south of Half Moon Island.

The hook is named after the town of Ihtiman in western Bulgaria.

== Location ==
Ihtiman Hook is located at 62°36′43″S 59°54′51″W. Bulgarian topographic survey Tangra 2004/05. British mapping in 1968, Chilean in 1971, Argentine in 1980, and Bulgarian in 2005 and 2009.

== Map ==
L.L. Ivanov. Antarctica: Livingston Island and Greenwich, Robert, Snow and Smith Islands. Scale 1:120000 topographic map. Troyan: Manfred Wörner Foundation, 2009. ISBN 978-954-92032-6-4
