= Kaloyan Nunatak =

Feature in the South Shetland Islands, Antarctica

Location of Tangra Mountains on Livingston Island in the South Shetland Islands.

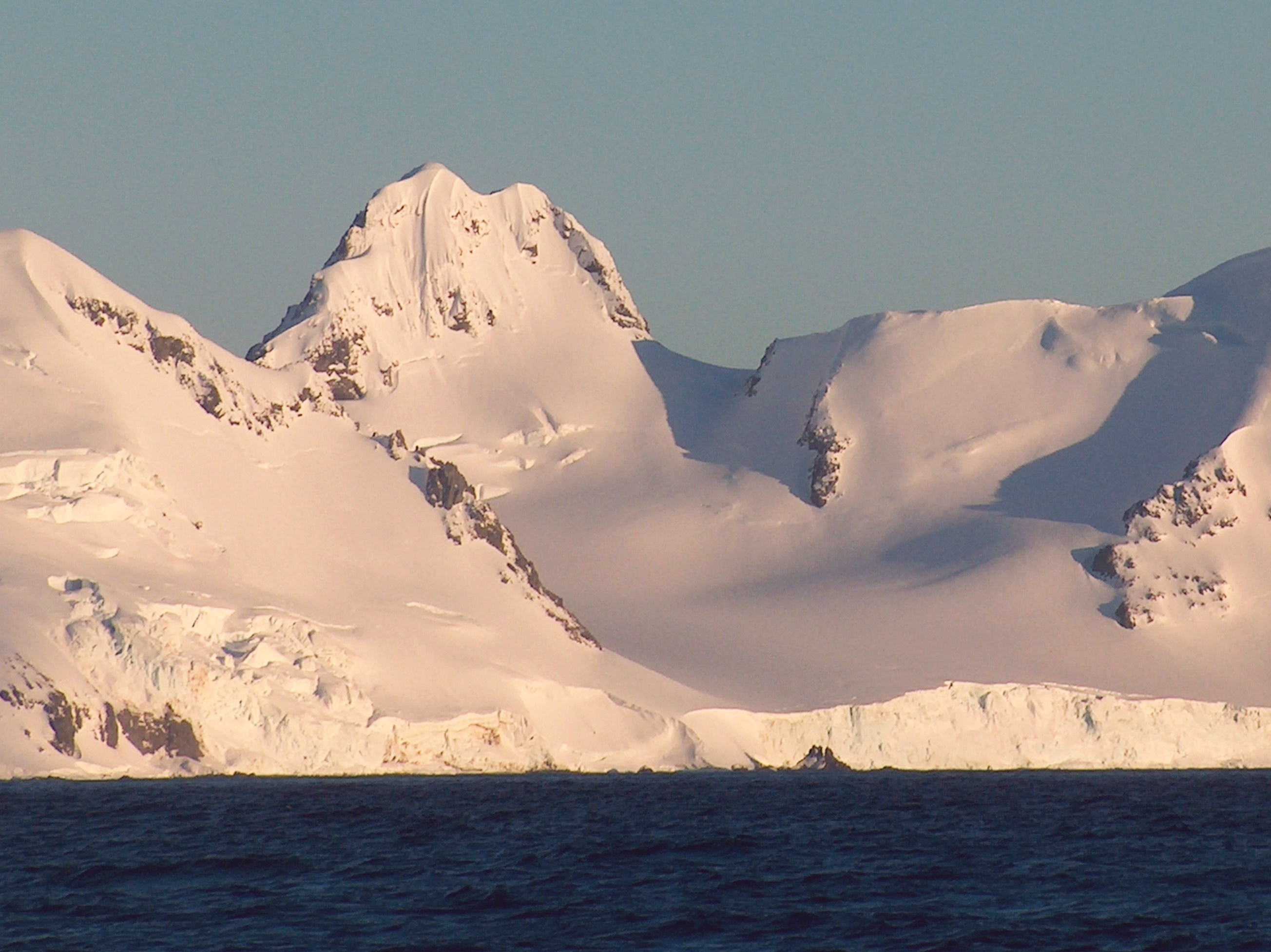
Kaloyan Nunatak from Bransfield Strait.

Topographic map of Livingston Island and Smith Island.

Kaloyan Nunatak (pronounced ka-lo-'ya-nov 'nu-na-tak\) is a conspicuous nunatak in the Tangra Mountains. It is named after Czar Kaloyan of Bulgaria, 1197-1207 AD.

Kaloyan Nunatak rises to approximately 400 m in Delchev Ridge, Tangra Mountains, on eastern Livingston Island in the South Shetland Islands, Antarctica. It is situated next northeast of Sozopol Gap, 1.81 km east-northeast of Elena Peak, 1.53 km west-southwest of Mesta Peak and 3.32 km west-southwest of Renier Point. The peak surmounts Pautalia Glacier to the south, and Sopot Ice Piedmont to the west, north, and northeast.

It was mapped in 2005 and 2009 from the Tangra 2004/05 topographic survey, and has since been registered in the SCAR Composite Antarctic Gazetteer.

Kaloyan Nunatak is located at 62°37′23.8″S 59°51′48″W.

== Maps ==
- L.L. Ivanov et al. Antarctica: Livingston Island and Greenwich Island, South Shetland Islands. Scale 1:100000 topographic map. Sofia: Antarctic Place-names Commission of Bulgaria, 2005.
- L.L. Ivanov. Antarctica: Livingston Island and Greenwich, Robert, Snow and Smith Islands. Scale 1:120000 topographic map. Troyan: Manfred Wörner Foundation, 2009.
- L.L. Ivanov. Antarctica: Livingston Island and Greenwich, Robert, Snow and Smith Islands. Scale 1:120000 topographic map. Troyan: Manfred Wörner Foundation, 2010. ISBN 978-954-92032-9-5 (First edition 2009. ISBN 978-954-92032-6-4)
- Antarctic Digital Database (ADD). Scale 1:250000 topographic map of Antarctica. Scientific Committee on Antarctic Research (SCAR). Since 1993, regularly upgraded and updated.
- L.L. Ivanov. Antarctica: Livingston Island and Smith Island. Scale 1:100000 topographic map. Manfred Wörner Foundation, 2017. ISBN 978-619-90008-3-0
