= Elena Peak =

700m peak in the South Shetland Islands, Antarctica

Location of Tangra Mountains on Livingston Island in the South Shetland Islands.

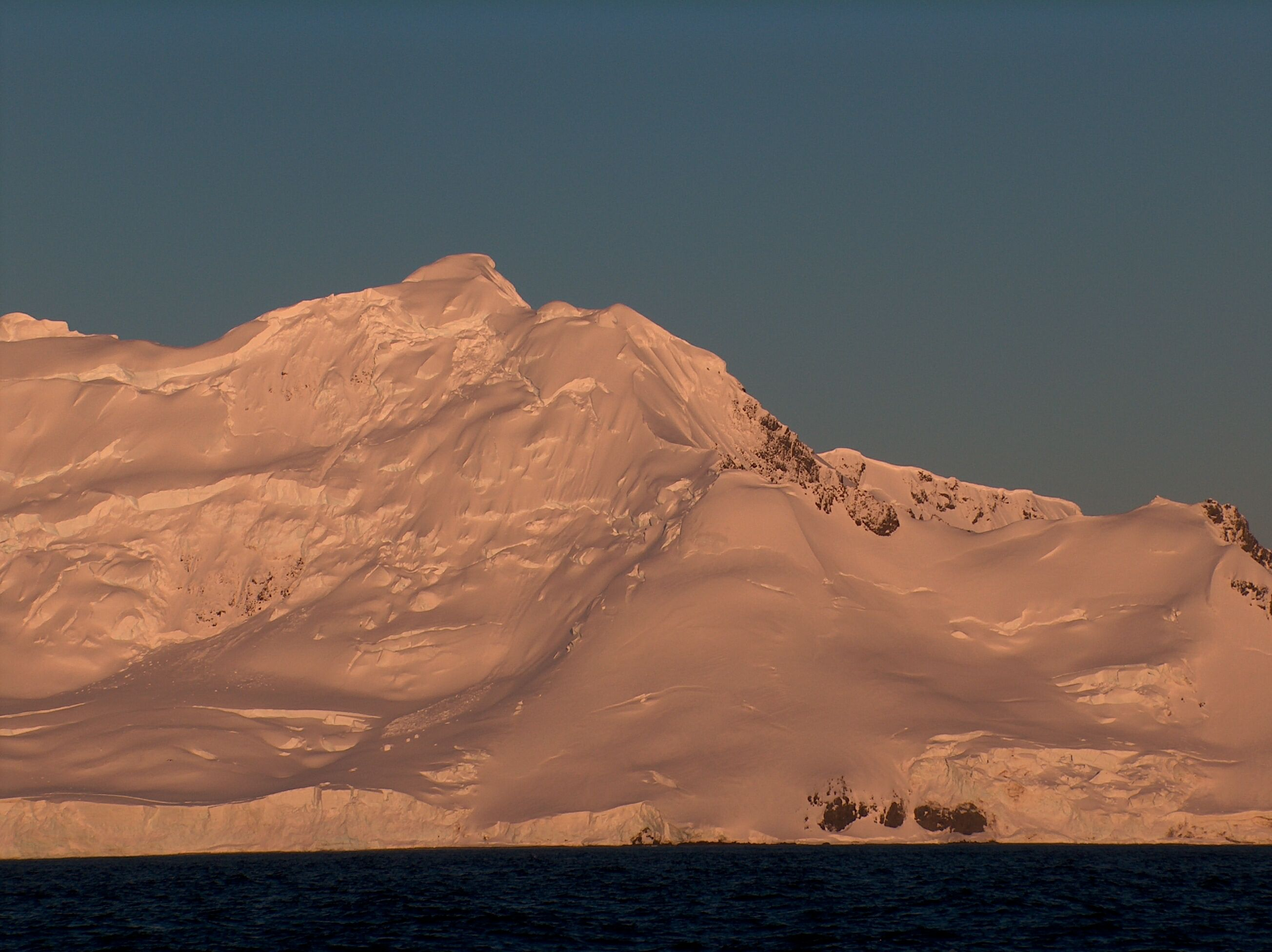
Elena Peak from Bransfield Strait.

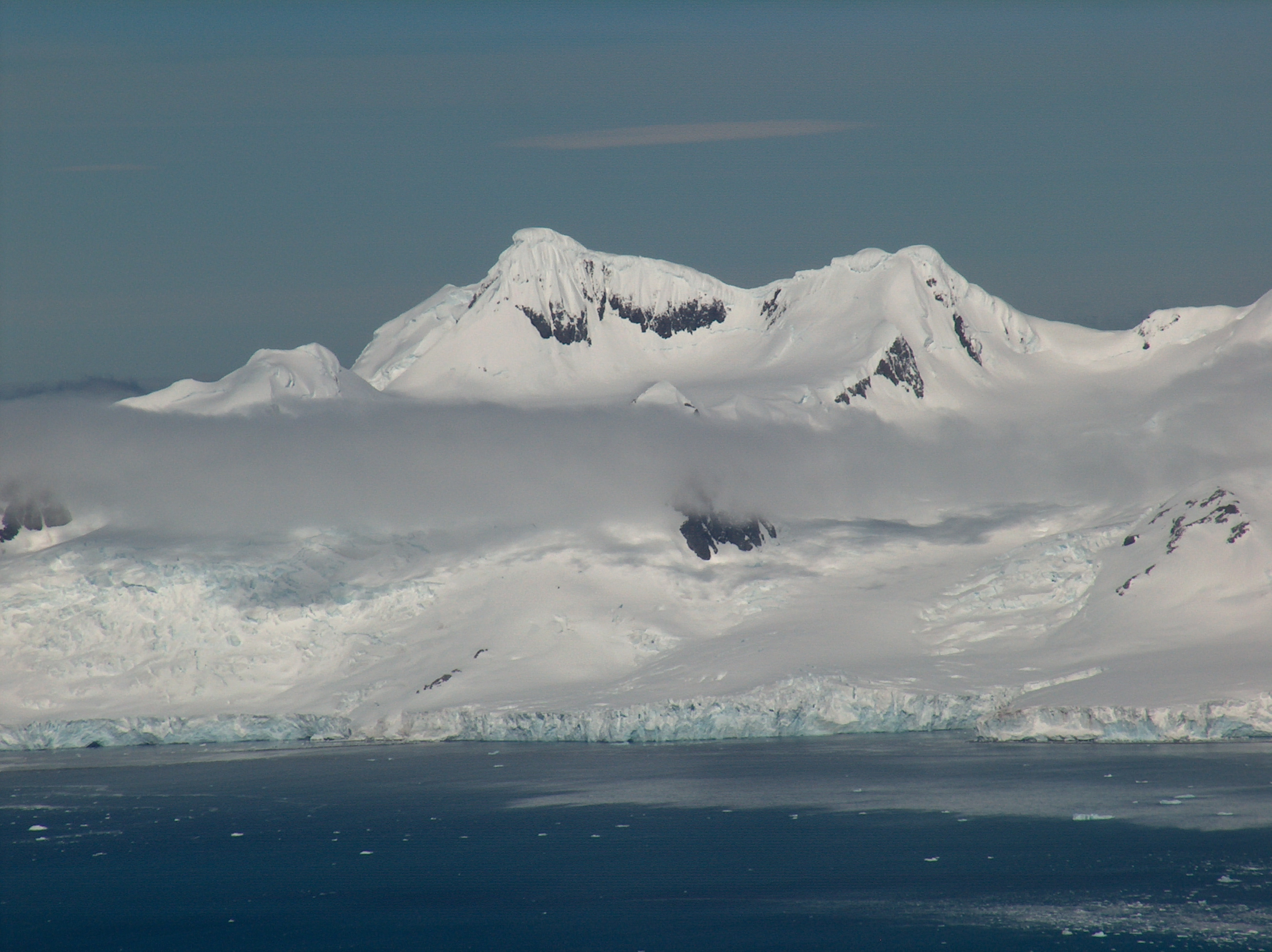
Elena Peak and Yavorov Peak from Miziya Peak, with Moon Bay and Sopot Ice Piedmont in the foreground.

Topographic map of Livingston Island and Smith Island.

Elena Peak (Bulgarian: връх Елена, romanized: vrah Elena, IPA: [ˈvrɤx ɛˈlɛnɐ]) is a 700 m peak in Delchev Ridge, Tangra Mountains on Livingston Island in the South Shetland Islands. The peak surmounts Sopot Ice Piedmont to the north and Strandzha Glacier to the south, and was named after the Bulgarian town of Elena.

The east slopes of Elena Peak and the north side of Delchev Ridge towards Renier Point, together with the adjacent portion of Sopot Ice Piedmont are a popular site for backcountry skiing and climbing, with skiers landed by Zodiac rigid inflatable boats from cruise ships visiting the Half Moon Island area.

== Location ==
The peak is located at 62°37′50.3″S 59°53′41″W which is 2.29 km east-northeast of Delchev Peak and 5.13 km west-southwest of Renier Point.

== Elena Peak in popular culture ==
The cover of the VA album Under Heaven: Vinson Massif (2010) actually features a photo not of Vinson Massif but of Delchev Ridge instead, with Mugla Passage and Vaptsarov Peak in the foreground, and (left to right) Elena Peak and Delchev Peak in the background. Both the picture and the misidentification may have possibly originated in the ‘Vinson Massif’ entry of the ‘Seven Summits Quest’ website.

== Maps ==
- South Shetland Islands. Scale 1:200000 topographic map No. 3373. DOS 610 – W 62 58. Tolworth, UK, 1968.
- Islas Livingston y Decepción. Mapa topográfico a escala 1:100000. Madrid: Servicio Geográfico del Ejército, 1991.
- S. Soccol, D. Gildea and J. Bath. Livingston Island, Antarctica. Scale 1:100000 satellite map. The Omega Foundation, USA, 2004.
- L.L. Ivanov et al., Antarctica: Livingston Island and Greenwich Island, South Shetland Islands (from English Strait to Morton Strait, with illustrations and ice-cover distribution), 1:100000 scale topographic map, Antarctic Place-names Commission of Bulgaria, Sofia, 2005
- L.L. Ivanov. Antarctica: Livingston Island and Greenwich, Robert, Snow and Smith Islands. Scale 1:120000 topographic map. Troyan: Manfred Wörner Foundation, 2010. ISBN 978-954-92032-9-5 (First edition 2009. ISBN 978-954-92032-6-4)
- Antarctic Digital Database (ADD). Scale 1:250000 topographic map of Antarctica. Scientific Committee on Antarctic Research (SCAR), 1993–2016.
