= Rila Point =

Ice-free area in Antarctica

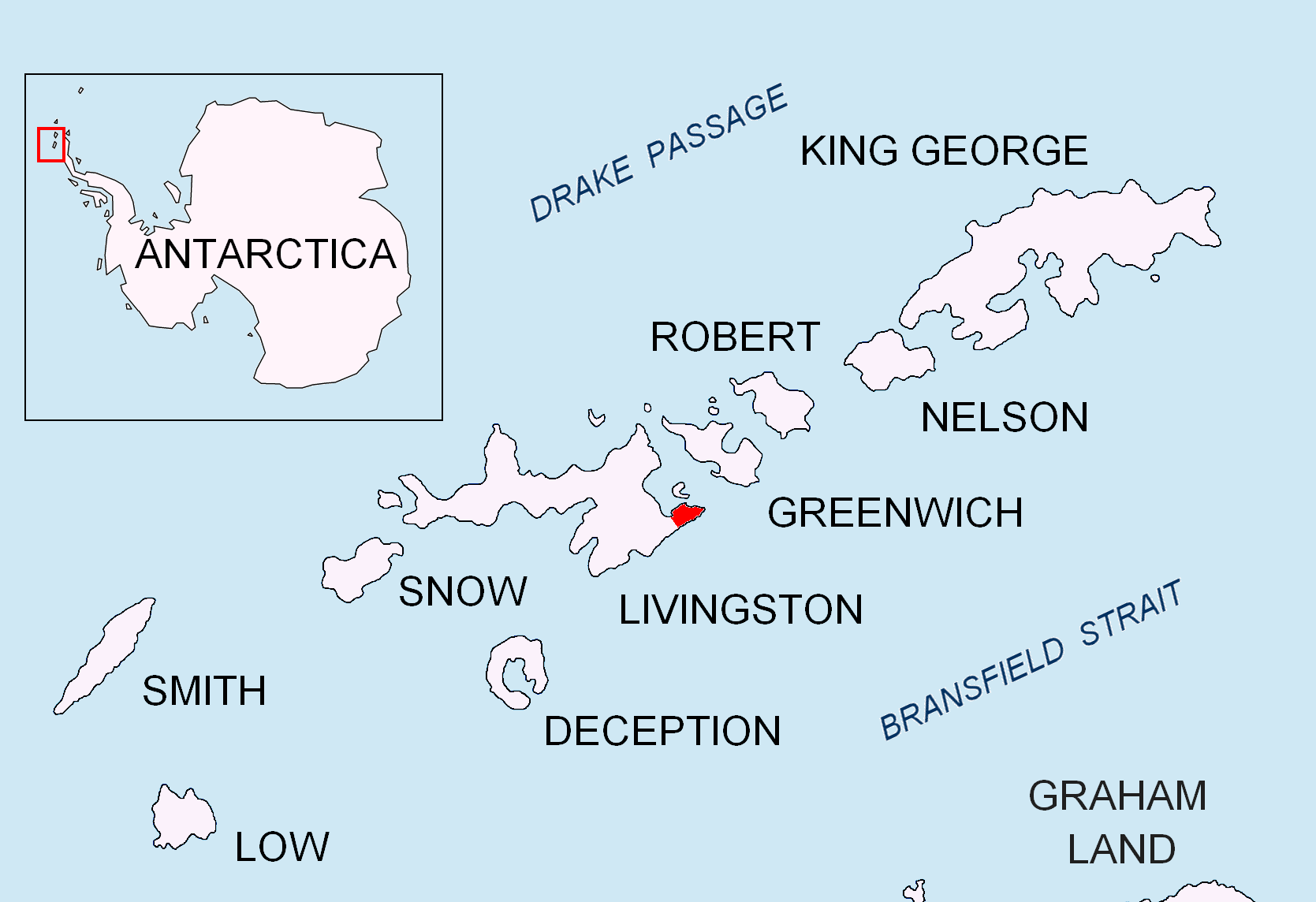
Location of Burgas Peninsula on Livingston Island in the South Shetland Islands.

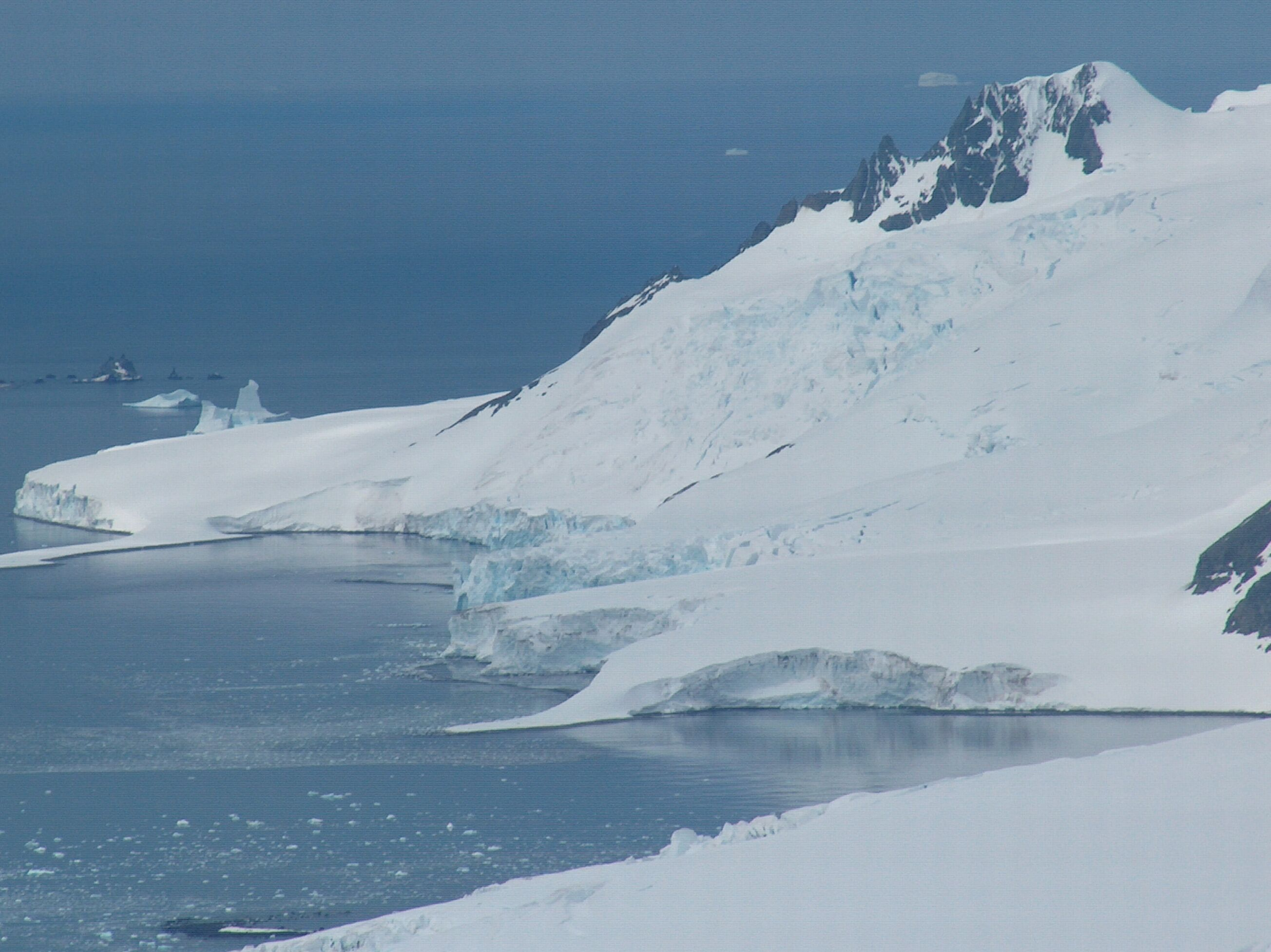
Rila Point from Kuzman Knoll, with Vaptsarov Peak in the background and Ihtiman Hook on the left.

Topographic map of Livingston Island and Smith Island.

Rila Point (Nos Rila \'nos 'ri-la\) is a low, ice-free point on the south coast of Moon Bay, projecting 330 m west-northwestwards from Burgas Peninsula on Livingston Island in the South Shetland Islands, Antarctica, and forming the east side of the entrance to Bruix Cove. The point is named after Rila Mountain, Bulgaria.

== Location ==
The spit is located at 62°37′12.5″S 59°58′20.5″W, which is 3.2 km northwest of Delchev Peak, 1.93 km east of Yana Point, 9 km south of Edinburgh Hill, 3.51 km southwest of Half Moon Island and 8.65 km west of Renier Point.

== Maps ==
- South Shetland Islands. Scale 1:200000 topographic map No. 3373. DOS 610 – W 62 58. Tolworth, UK, 1968.
- Islas Livingston y Decepción. Mapa topográfico a escala 1:100000. Madrid: Servicio Geográfico del Ejército, 1991.
- S. Soccol, D. Gildea and J. Bath. Livingston Island, Antarctica. Scale 1:100000 satellite map. The Omega Foundation, USA, 2004.
- L.L. Ivanov et al., Antarctica: Livingston Island and Greenwich Island, South Shetland Islands (from English Strait to Morton Strait, with illustrations and ice-cover distribution), 1:100000 scale topographic map, Antarctic Place-names Commission of Bulgaria, Sofia, 2005
- L.L. Ivanov. Antarctica: Livingston Island and Greenwich, Robert, Snow and Smith Islands. Scale 1:120000 topographic map. Troyan: Manfred Wörner Foundation, 2010. ISBN 978-954-92032-9-5 (First edition 2009. ISBN 978-954-92032-6-4)
- Antarctic Digital Database (ADD). Scale 1:250000 topographic map of Antarctica. Scientific Committee on Antarctic Research (SCAR). Since 1993, regularly upgraded and updated.
- L.L. Ivanov. Antarctica: Livingston Island and Smith Island. Scale 1:100000 topographic map. Manfred Wörner Foundation, 2017. ISBN 978-619-90008-3-0
