= Delchev Peak =

Mountain in Livingston Island, South Shetland Islands, Antarctica

Location of Tangra Mountains on Livingston Island in the South Shetland Islands.

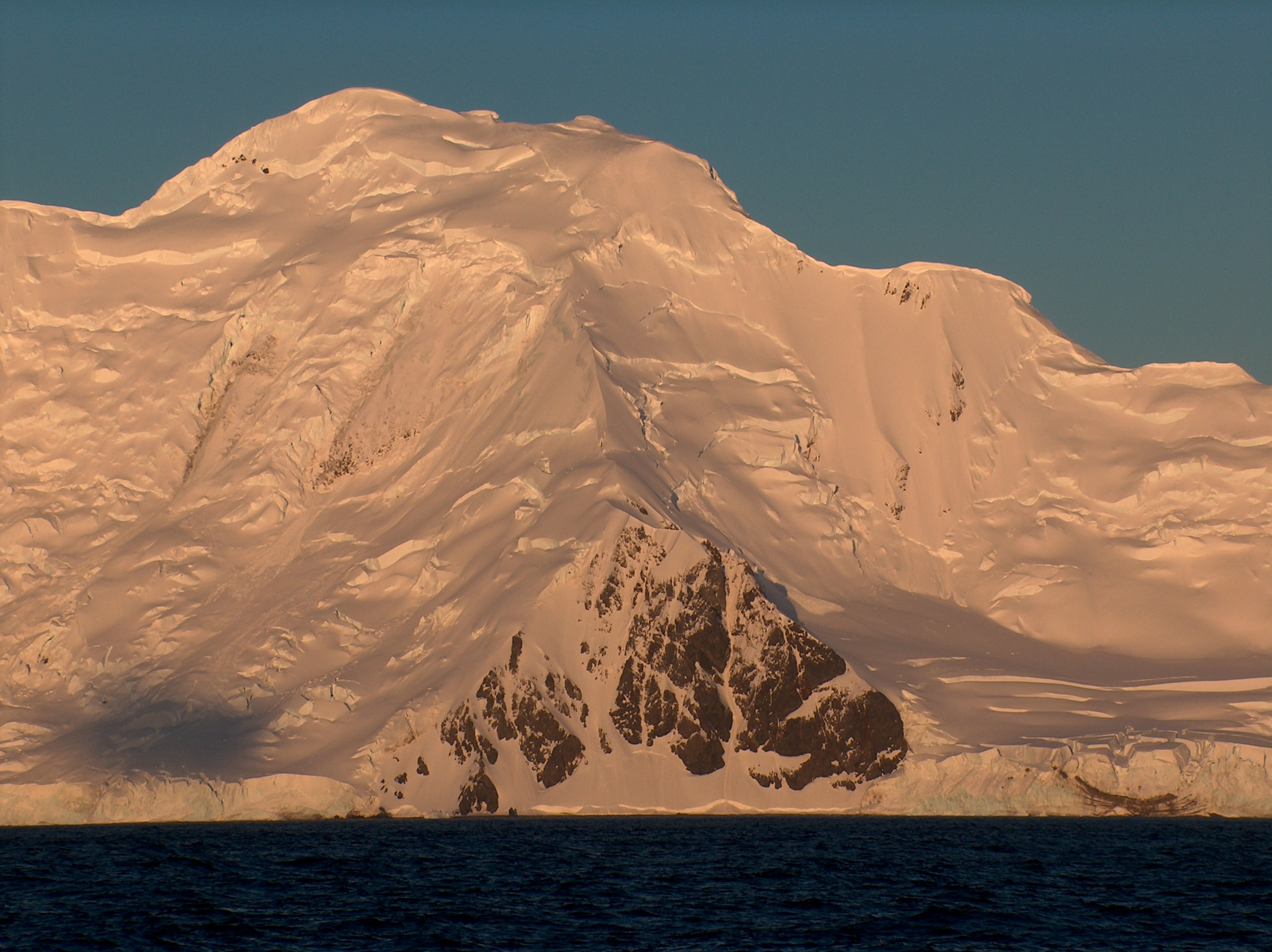
Delchev Peak from Bransfield Strait

Topographic map of Livingston Island and Smith Island.

Delchev Peak (Bulgarian: Делчев връх, romanized: Delchev vrah, IPA: [ˈdɛɫt͡ʃɛv ˈvrɤx]) is the summit of Delchev Ridge, Tangra Mountains, Livingston Island and rises to approximately 940 m. The peak surmounts Iskar Glacier to the west, Sopot Ice Piedmont to the north, and Ropotamo Glacier to the south. The peak is "named after Gotse Delchev (1872–1903), leader of the Bulgarian liberation movement in Macedonia".

== Location ==
The peak is located at 62°38′29″S 59°55′58″W which is 7.2 km east-northeast of Great Needle Peak (Falsa Aguja), 3.2 km southeast of Rila Point and 7.6 km west-southwest of Renier Point.

== Delchev Peak in popular culture ==
The cover of the VA album Under Heaven: Vinson Massif (2010) actually features a photo not of Vinson Massif but of eastern Tangra Mountains instead, with Mugla Passage and Vaptsarov Peak in the foreground, and Elena Peak (left) and Delchev Peak (right) in the background. Both the picture and the misidentification may have possibly originated in the ‘Vinson Massif’ entry of the ‘Seven Summits Quest’ website.

== Maps ==
- L.L. Ivanov et al. Antarctica: Livingston Island and Greenwich Island, South Shetland Islands. Scale 1:100000 topographic map. Sofia: Antarctic Place-names Commission of Bulgaria, 2005.
- L.L. Ivanov. Antarctica: Livingston Island and Greenwich, Robert, Snow and Smith Islands. Scale 1:120000 topographic map. Troyan: Manfred Wörner Foundation, 2009. ISBN 978-954-92032-6-4
- Antarctic Digital Database (ADD). Scale 1:250000 topographic map of Antarctica. Scientific Committee on Antarctic Research (SCAR). Since 1993, regularly upgraded and updated.
- L.L. Ivanov. Antarctica: Livingston Island and Smith Island. Scale 1:100000 topographic map. Manfred Wörner Foundation, 2017. ISBN 978-619-90008-3-0
