= Sopot Ice Piedmont =

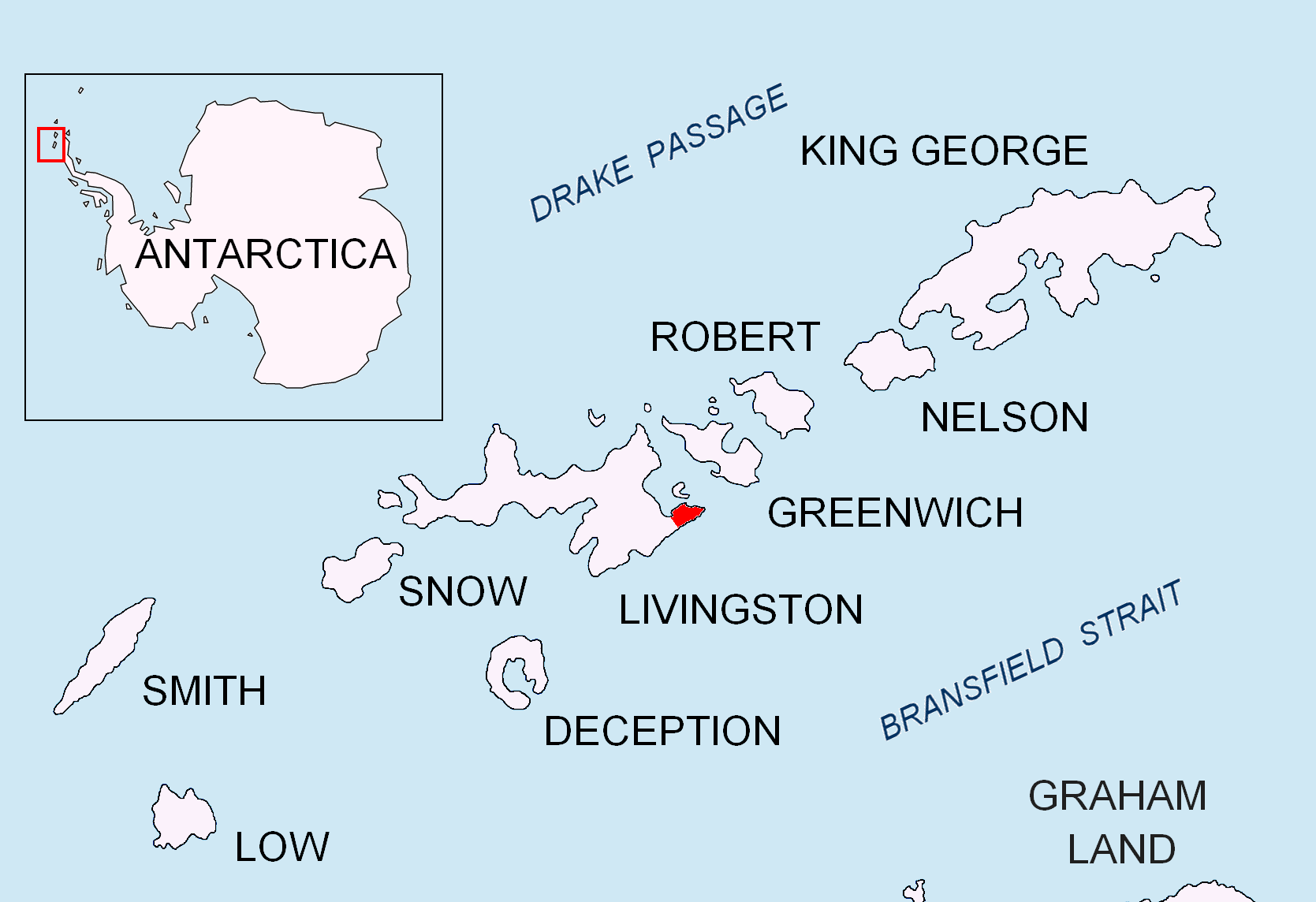
- Location of Burgas Peninsula on Livingston Island in the South Shetland Islands

- Location within South Shetland Islands Location within Antarctica
- Location: Livingston Island; South Shetland Islands
- Coordinates: 62°37′15″S 59°54′00″W
- Length: 4 nautical miles (7.4 km; 4.6 mi)
- Width: 1.3 nautical miles (2.4 km; 1.5 mi)
- Thickness: unknown
- Terminus: Moon Bay
- Status: unknown

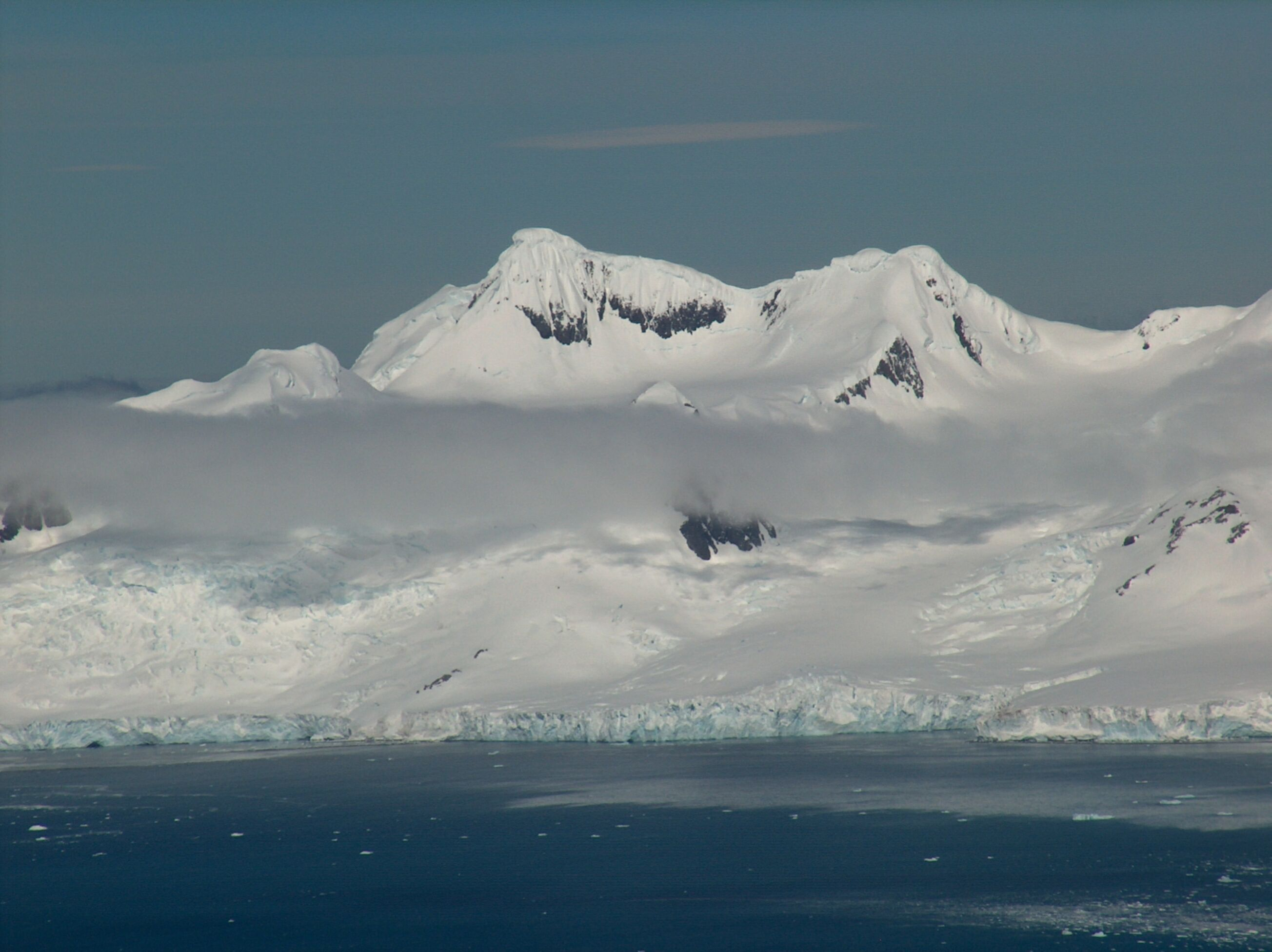
Sopot Ice Piedmont, with Elena Peak and Yavorov Peak in the background.

Topographic map of Livingston Island and Smith Island.

Sopot Ice Piedmont (Bulgarian: ледник Сопот, romanized: lednik Sopot, IPA: [ˈlɛdnik ˈsɔpot]) is an ice piedmont situated on Burgas Peninsula, Livingston Island in the South Shetland Islands, Antarctica, northeast of Iskar Glacier and north of Ropotamo, Strandzha and Pautalia Glaciers. It extends 7.5 km in east–west direction and 2.4 km in south–north direction, drains the northern slopes of Delchev Ridge east of Delchev Peak and Ghiaurov Peak, and flows northward into Moon Bay between Rila Point to the west and Malyovitsa Crag near Renier Point to the east.

The glacier is named after the Bulgarian town of Sopot.

== Location ==
Sopot Ice Piedmont is centred at 62°37′15″S 59°54′00″W. Bulgarian mapping in 2005 and 2009.

== See also ==
- List of glaciers in the Antarctic
- Glaciology

== Maps ==
- L.L. Ivanov et al. Antarctica: Livingston Island and Greenwich Island, South Shetland Islands. Scale 1:100000 topographic map. Sofia: Antarctic Place-names Commission of Bulgaria, 2005.
- L.L. Ivanov. Antarctica: Livingston Island and Greenwich, Robert, Snow and Smith Islands. Scale 1:120000 topographic map. Troyan: Manfred Wörner Foundation, 2009. ISBN 978-954-92032-6-4
