= Delchev Ridge =

Feature in South Shetland Islands, Antarctica

Location of Tangra Mountains on Livingston Island in the South Shetland Islands.

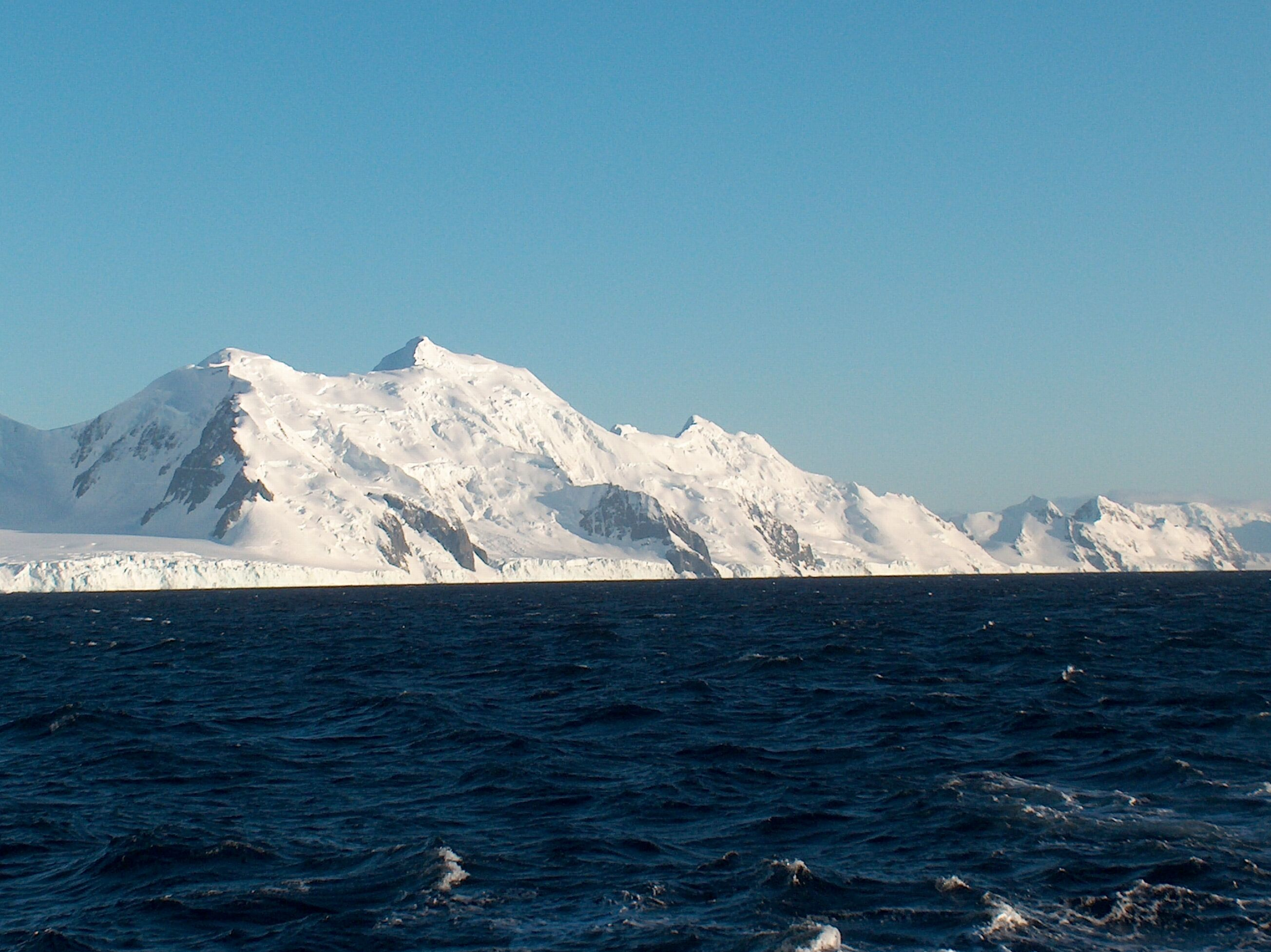
Delchev Ridge from Bransfield Strait, with (left to right) Kuber Peak, Delchev Peak and Elena Peak, and Greenwich Island in the background.

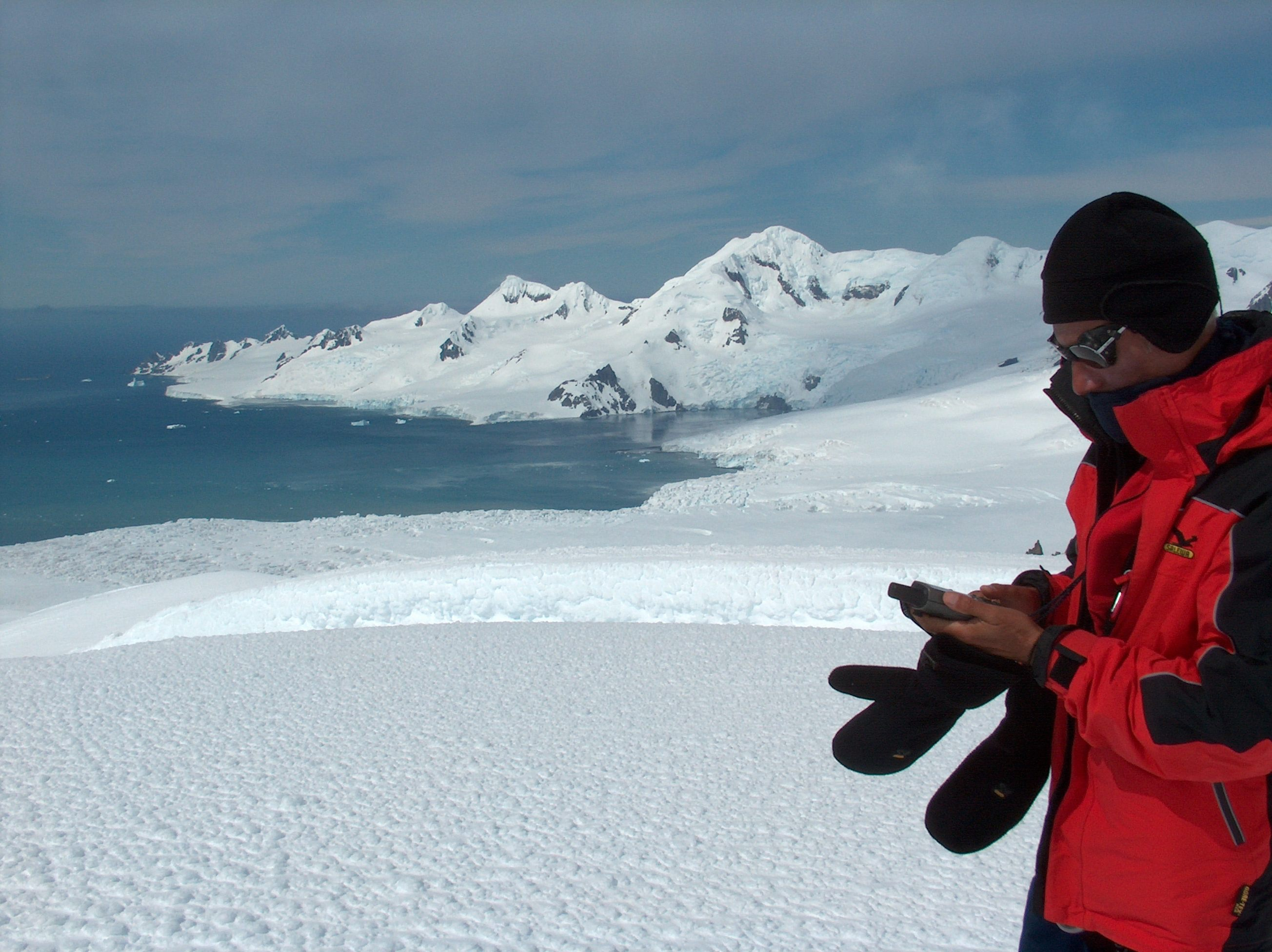
Fieldwork on Melnik Peak, with Delchev Ridge in the background.

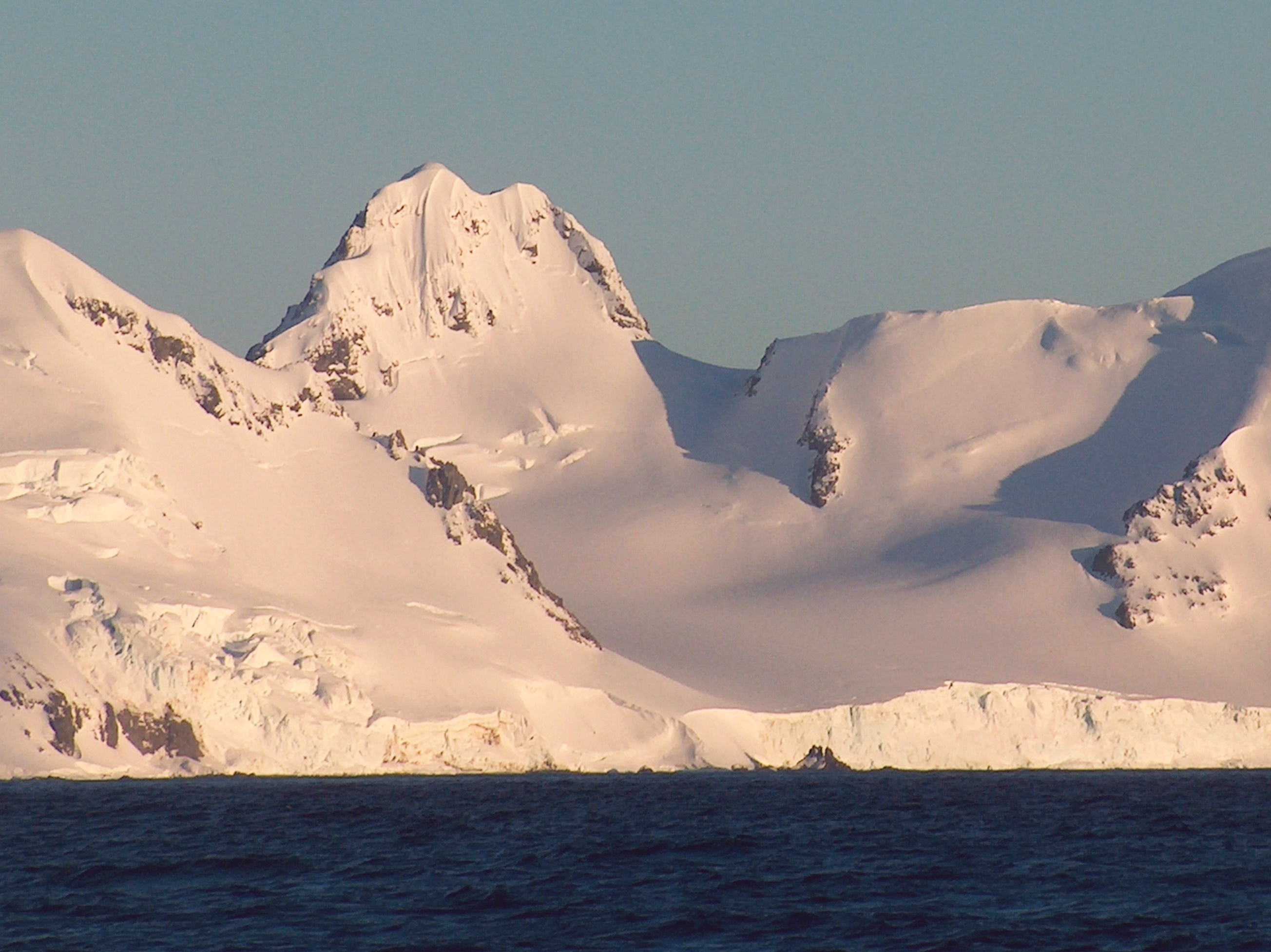
Kaloyan Nunatak from Bransfield Strait, with Pautalia Glacier in the foreground.

Topographic map of Livingston Island, Greenwich, Robert, Snow and Smith Islands.

Delchev Ridge (Delchev Hrebet \'del-chev 'hre-bet\) is the eastern ridge of the Tangra Mountains, Livingston Island extending 10 km east-northeastward from Devin Saddle to Renier Point. The ridge is named in association with its summit Delchev Peak (ca. 940 m).

The north slopes of the ridge between Elena Peak and Renier Point together with the adjacent portion of Sopot Ice Piedmont are a popular site for backcountry skiing and climbing, with skiers landed by Zodiac rigid inflatable boats from cruise ships visiting the Half Moon Island area.

== Location ==
The midpoint of Delchev Ridge is located at 62°37′55″S 59°54′15″W. The ridge was mapped by the UK Directorate of Overseas Surveys in 1968, Argentine mapping in 1980 and Bulgarian mapping in 2005 and 2009.

== Delchev Ridge in popular culture ==
The cover of the VA album Under Heaven: Vinson Massif (2010) actually features a photo not of Vinson Massif but of Delchev Ridge instead, with Mugla Passage and Vaptsarov Peak in the foreground, and (left to right) Elena Peak and Delchev Peak in the background. Both the picture and the misidentification may have possibly originated in the ‘Vinson Massif’ entry of the ‘Seven Summits Quest’ website.

== See also ==
- Tangra Mountains
- Livingston Island
- South Shetland Islands
- Antarctica

== Maps ==
- South Shetland Islands. Scale 1:200000 topographic map No. 3373. DOS 610 – W 62 58. Tolworth, UK, 1968.
- Islas Livingston y Decepción. Mapa topográfico a escala 1:100000. Madrid: Servicio Geográfico del Ejército, 1991.
- S. Soccol, D. Gildea and J. Bath. Livingston Island, Antarctica. Scale 1:100000 satellite map. The Omega Foundation, USA, 2004.
- L.L. Ivanov et al., Antarctica: Livingston Island and Greenwich Island, South Shetland Islands (from English Strait to Morton Strait, with illustrations and ice-cover distribution), 1:100000 scale topographic map, Antarctic Place-names Commission of Bulgaria, Sofia, 2005
- L.L. Ivanov. Antarctica: Livingston Island and Greenwich, Robert, Snow and Smith Islands. Scale 1:120000 topographic map. Troyan: Manfred Wörner Foundation, 2010. ISBN 978-954-92032-9-5 (First edition 2009. ISBN 978-954-92032-6-4)
- Antarctic Digital Database (ADD). Scale 1:250000 topographic map of Antarctica. Scientific Committee on Antarctic Research (SCAR), 1993–2016.
