= Renier Point =

Narrow point on the Burgas Peninsula and Livingston Island

- Point
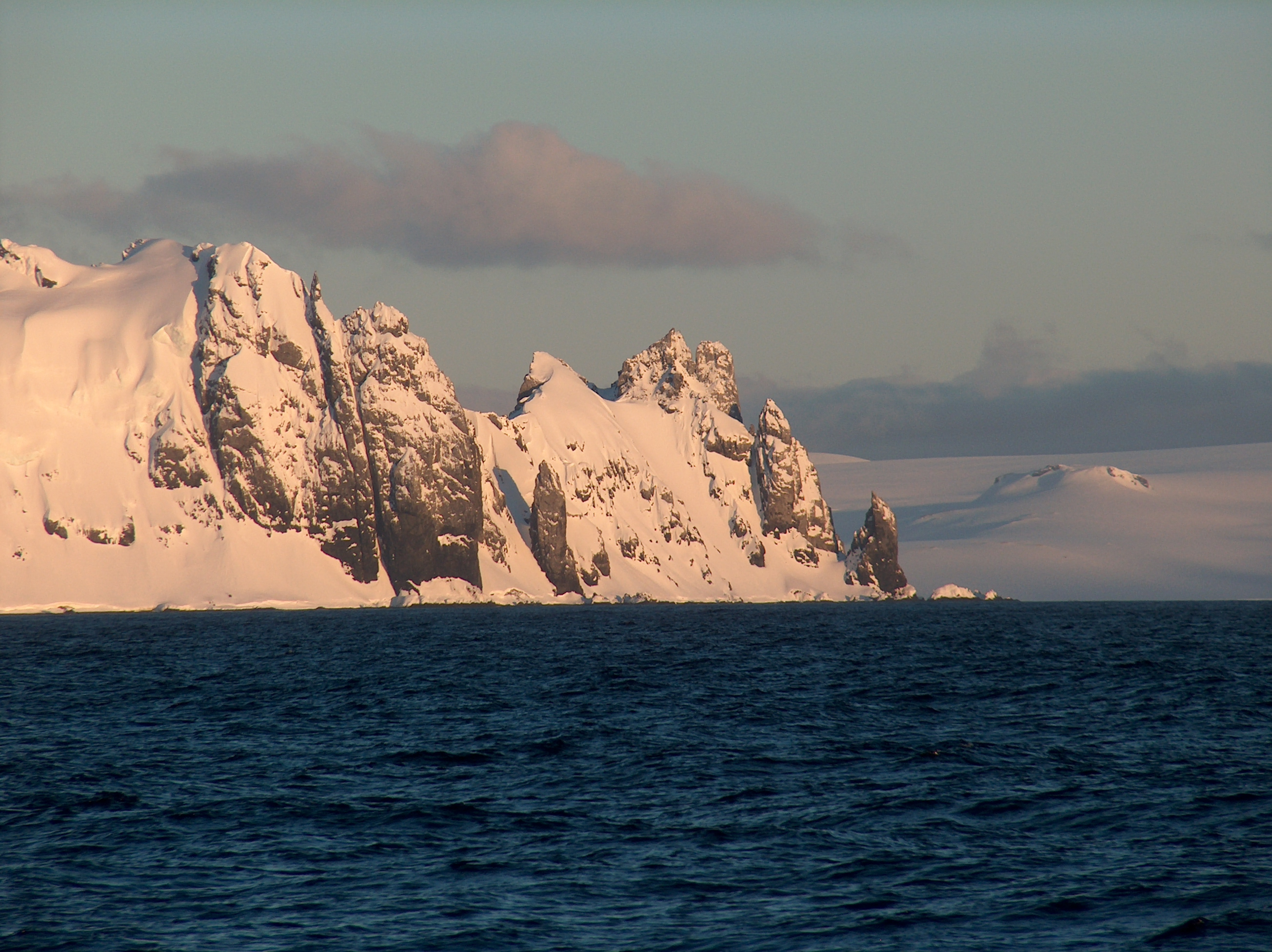
- Renier Point from Bransfield Strait

- Location within Antarctica
- Coordinates: 62°36′34″S 59°48′21″W
- Location: Livingston Island, South Shetland Islands, Antarctica
- Part of: Burgas Peninsula

Renier Point (62°36′34″S 59°48′21″W) is a narrow point forming the east extremity of both Burgas Peninsula and Livingston Island in the South Shetland Islands, Antarctica. The feature was known to sealers as Point Renier as early as 1821. The name ‘Pin Point’, given by Discovery Investigations personnel on the Discovery II in 1935, has been rejected in favor of the original name.

== Maps ==
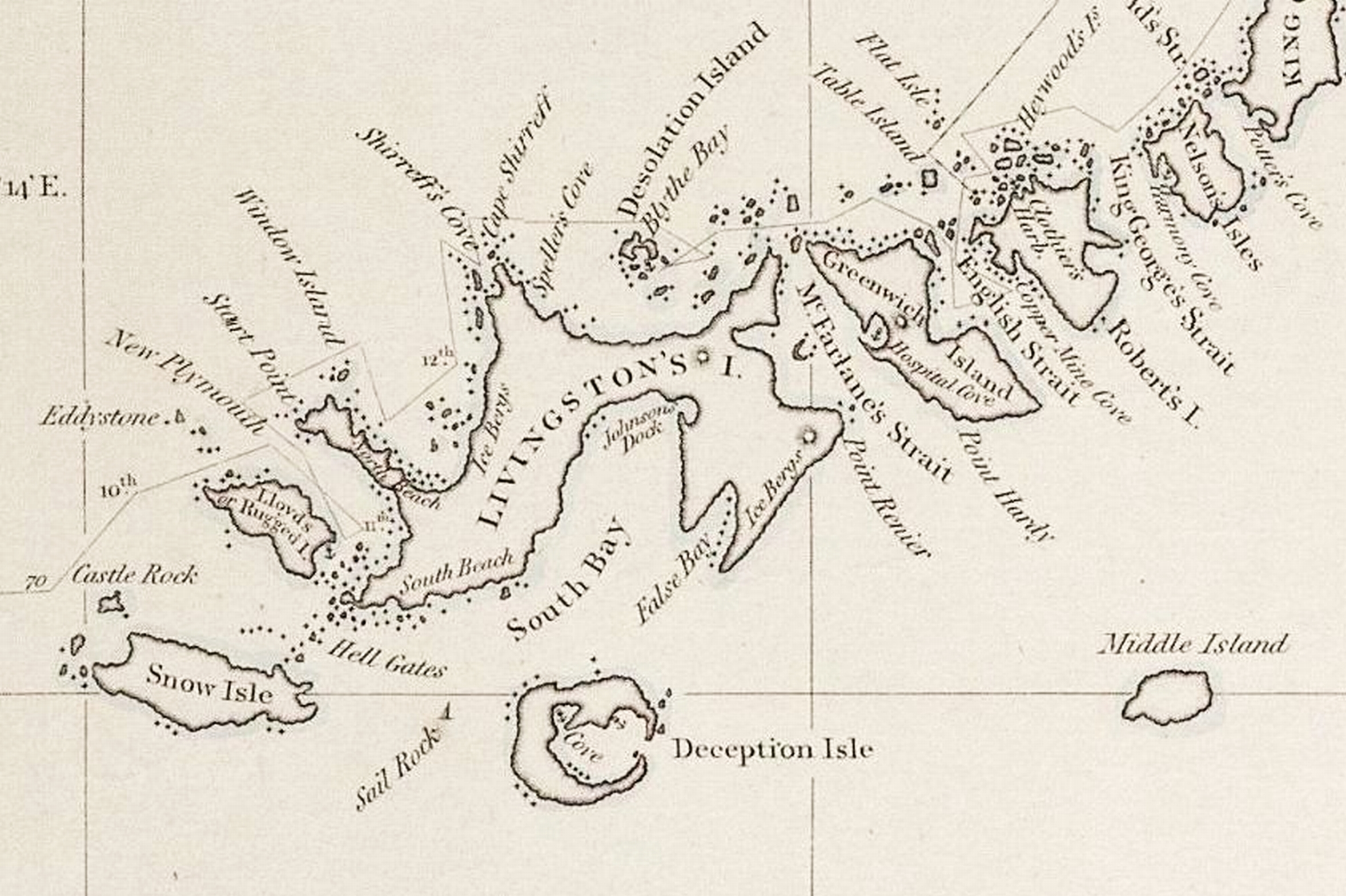
Fragment of George Powell's 1822 chart of the South Shetland Islands and South Orkney Islands featuring Renier Point

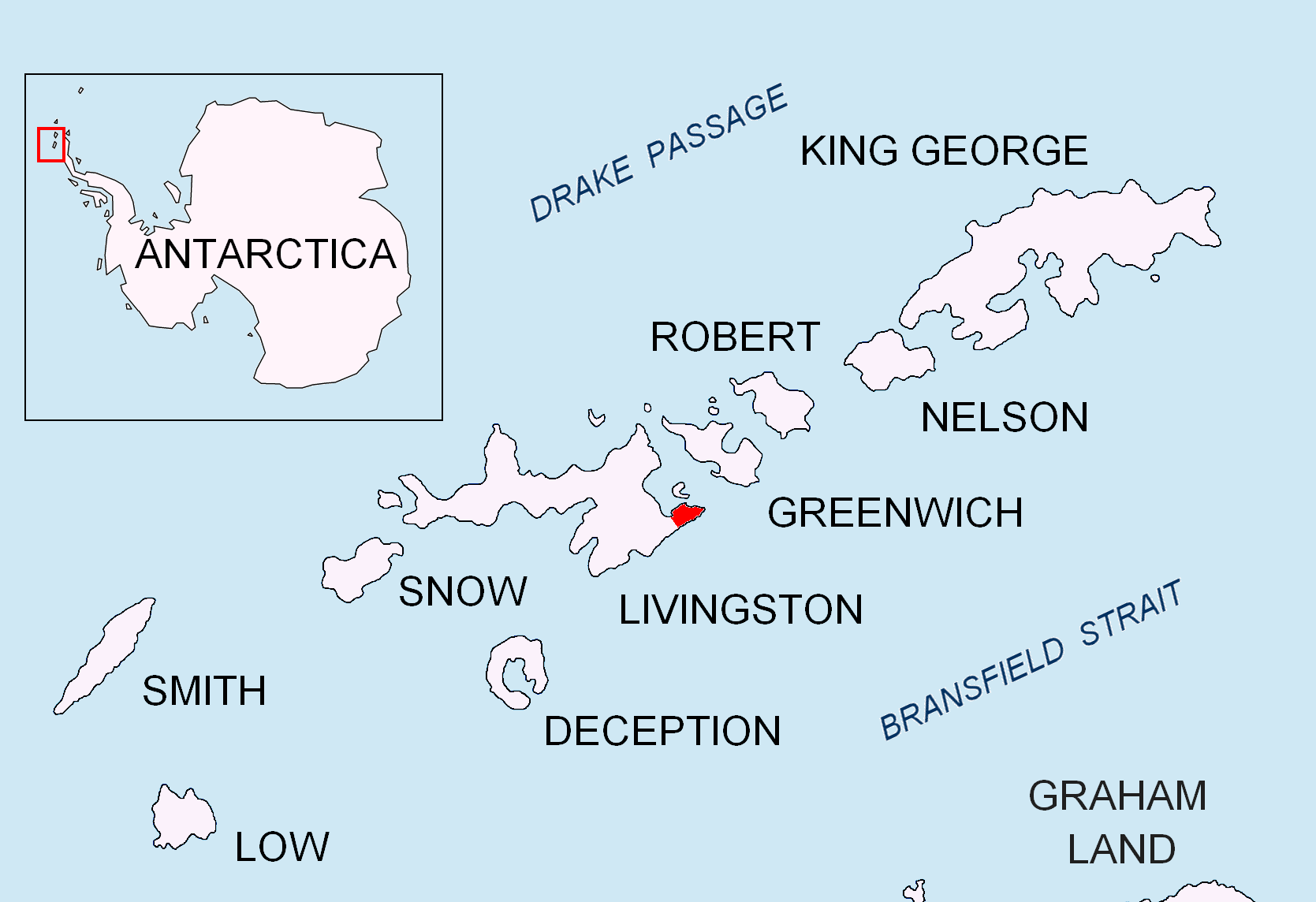
Location of Burgas Peninsula, Livingston Island in the South Shetland Islands

- Chart of South Shetland including Coronation Island, &c. from the exploration of the sloop Dove in the years 1821 and 1822 by George Powell Commander of the same. Scale ca. 1:200000. London: Laurie, 1822.
- South Shetland Islands. Scale 1:200000 topographic map. DOS 610 Sheet W 62 58. Tolworth, UK, 1968.
- Islas Livingston y Decepción. Mapa topográfico a escala 1:100000. Madrid: Servicio Geográfico del Ejército, 1991.
- L.L. Ivanov et al. Antarctica: Livingston Island and Greenwich Island, South Shetland Islands. Scale 1:100000 topographic map. Sofia: Antarctic Place-names Commission of Bulgaria, 2005.
- L.L. Ivanov. Antarctica: Livingston Island and Greenwich, Robert, Snow and Smith Islands. Scale 1:120000 topographic map. Troyan: Manfred Wörner Foundation, 2009. ISBN 978-954-92032-6-4
- Antarctic Digital Database (ADD). Scale 1:250000 topographic map of Antarctica. Scientific Committee on Antarctic Research (SCAR). Since 1993, regularly updated.
- L.L. Ivanov. Antarctica: Livingston Island and Smith Island. Scale 1:100000 topographic map. Manfred Wörner Foundation, 2017. ISBN 978-619-90008-3-0

== See also ==
- Rugged Rocks
