= Tavigny Castle =

Medieval castle in Belgium

Coordinates: 50.108°N 5.839°E

- Belgium
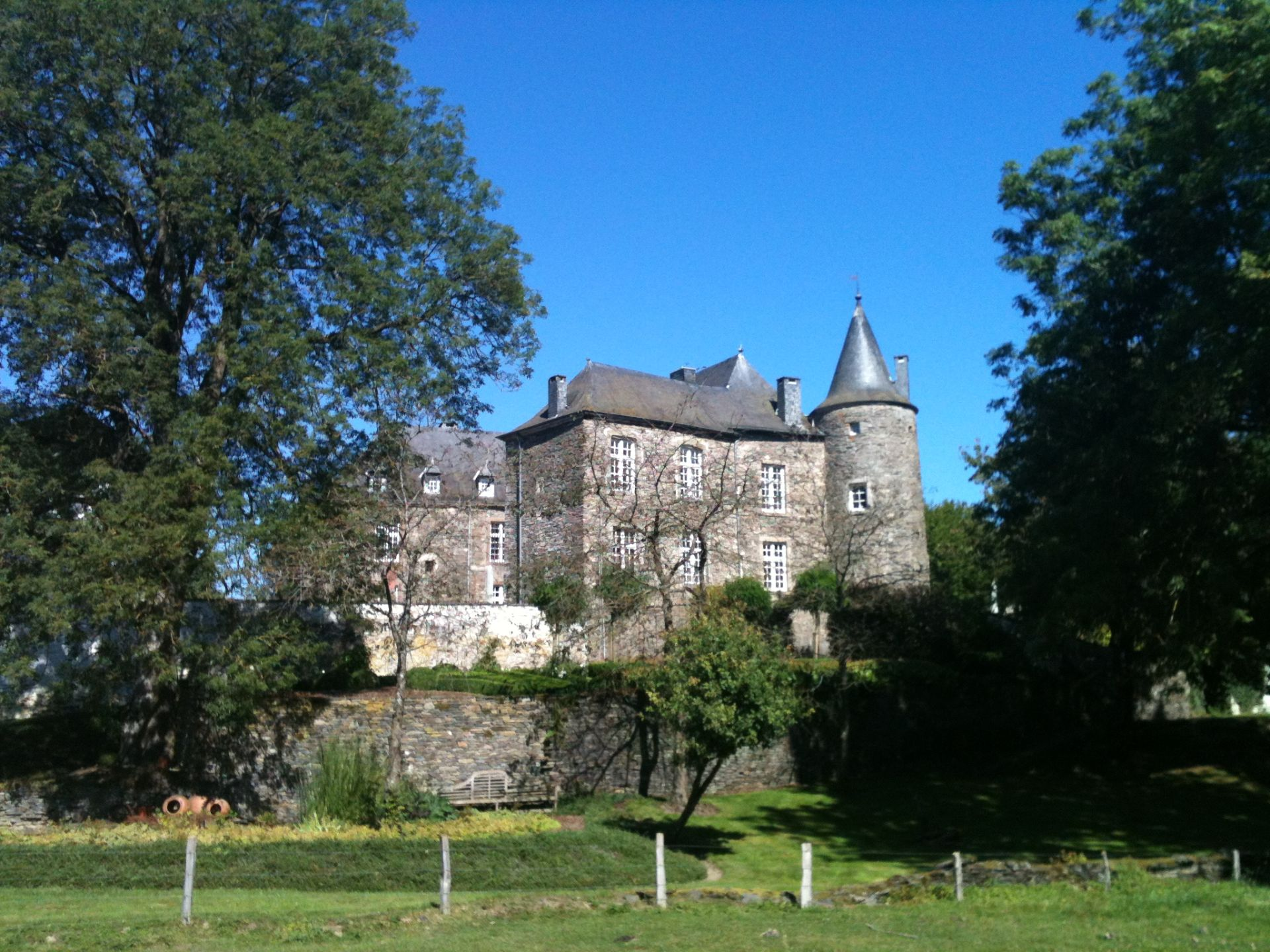
- Tavigny Castle in 2012

Site information
- Type: Castle

Site history
- Built: 14th century

Tavigny Castle (French: Château de Tavigny) is a castle in Tavigny, in the municipality of Houffalize, Wallonia, Belgium. It was first built during the late Middle Ages.

== See also ==
- List of castles in Belgium
