= Burp Castle =

Beer bar in Manhattan, New York City

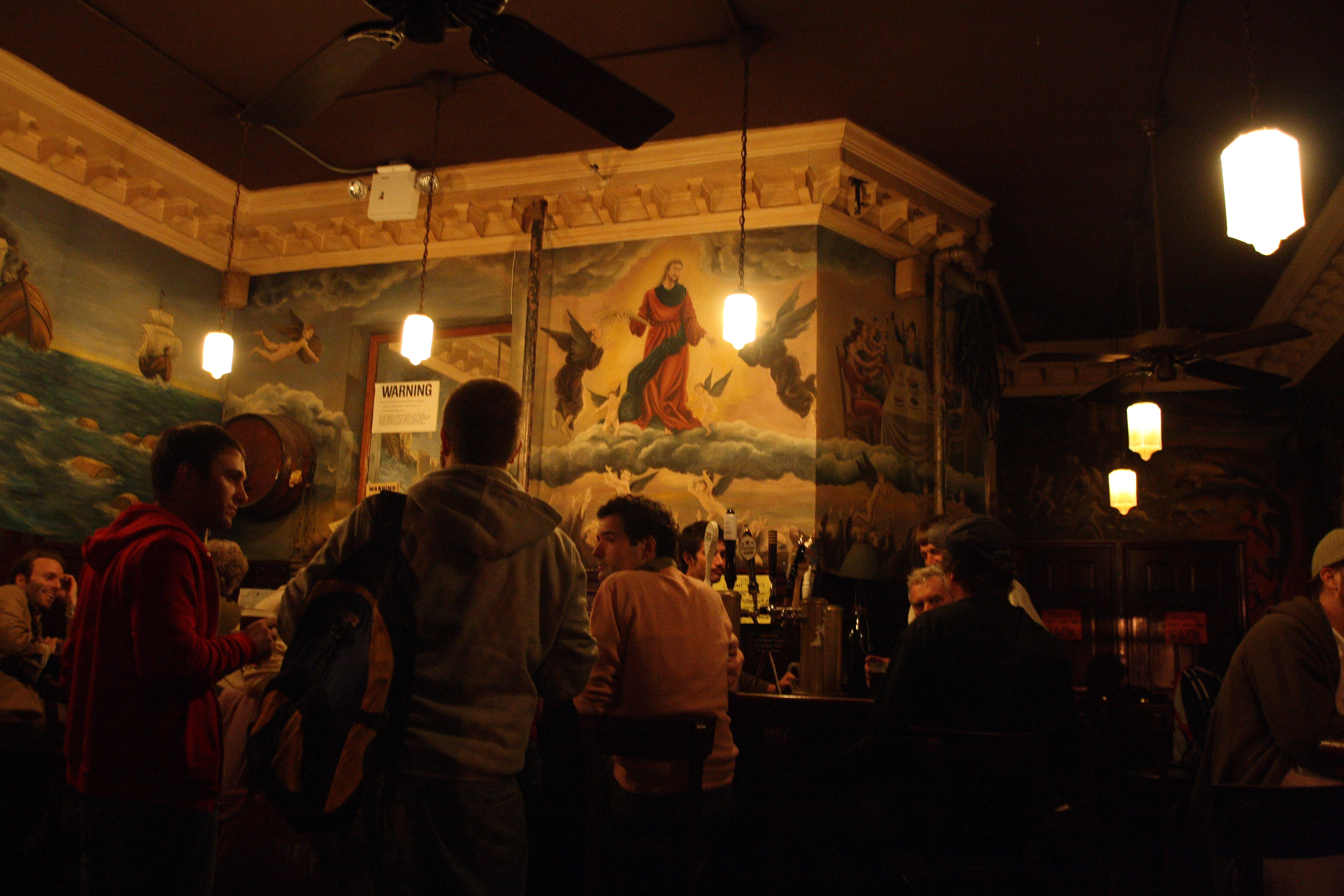
- The interior of the bar in 2007
- Interactive map of Burp Castle

Restaurant information
- Established: 1992
- Food type: N/A (Bar only with no food)
- Location: New York City, United States
- Coordinates: 40°43′42.14″N 73°59′18.89″W

Burp Castle is a beer bar located in the East Village neighborhood of Manhattan in New York City. It is ostensibly "monastery-themed" and they primarily serve a rotating tap of Belgian beers such as La Chouffe along with some bottles such as Chimay along some beers from other countries such as Germany and Britain. Bartenders occasionally wear monastic robes, play Gregorian chants, and patrons are shushed if they speak above a whisper.

SoundPrint, an app that measures noise produced in restaurants and bars, lists Burp Castle as a particularly quiet location.
