= Achouffe =

Coordinates: 50.1506°N 5.7453°E

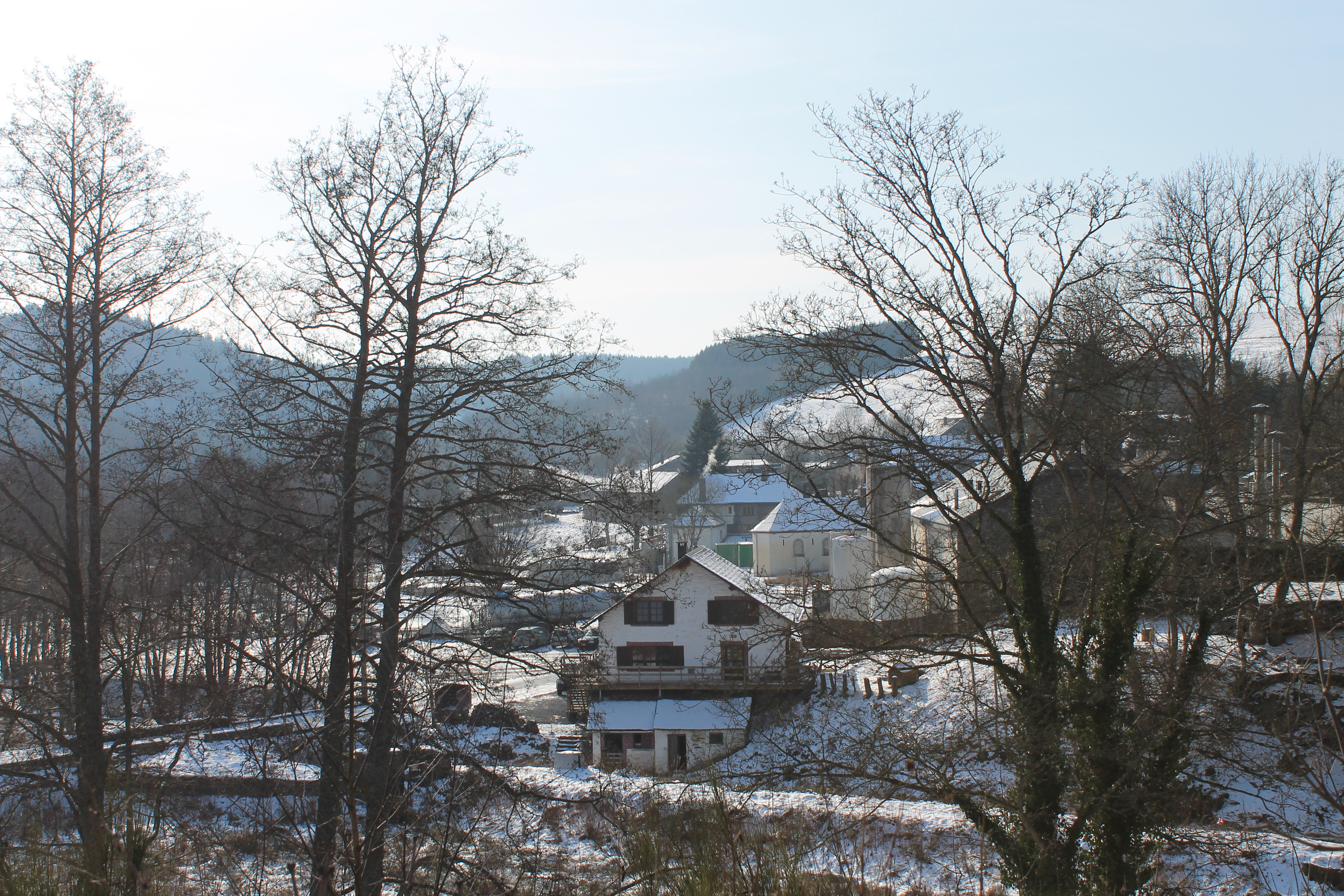
Achouffe

Achouffe (French pronunciation: [aʃuf]）) is a small village of Wallonia in the municipality of Houffalize, district of Wibrin, located in the province of Luxembourg, Belgium.

== Location ==
It is located in the forested Ardennes region.

Situated within the Bastogne district of Luxembourg province, it lies between the towns of Wibrin, and Mont on the Rue de la Grève (also known as the Rue d'Achouffe).

== Food and Drink Products ==
Outside of the region, Achouffe is primarily known as the home of the Brasserie d'Achouffe, producers of La Chouffe craft beer as well as a liqueur distilled from their beer.

A soft-ripened cheese called Patachouffe, that has been matured in their beer is also available from a local producer.
