= Tryavna Ultra =

Bulgarian ultramarathon race

Tryavna Ultra (Bulgarian: Трявна Ултра) is one of the biggest ultramarathon races in Bulgaria. It is held every year in July in the region around Tryavna. The longest course is 141 km long with 5840 m of elevation gain. Two additional courses are available - 76 km with 2820 m of elevation gain and 23 km with 706 m. The route of the long distance runs through the heart of the Balkan cultural heritage – architectural park Bozhentsi, an attractive place for tourists from around the world, through beautiful woodlands in eco-park Bulgarian woman, through three municipalities and dozens of picturesque villages.

Tryavna Ultra is a qualifying race for Ultra-Trail du Mont-Blanc, 141 km course ensures 6 points, while the 76 km course - 4 points.

== Race winners ==
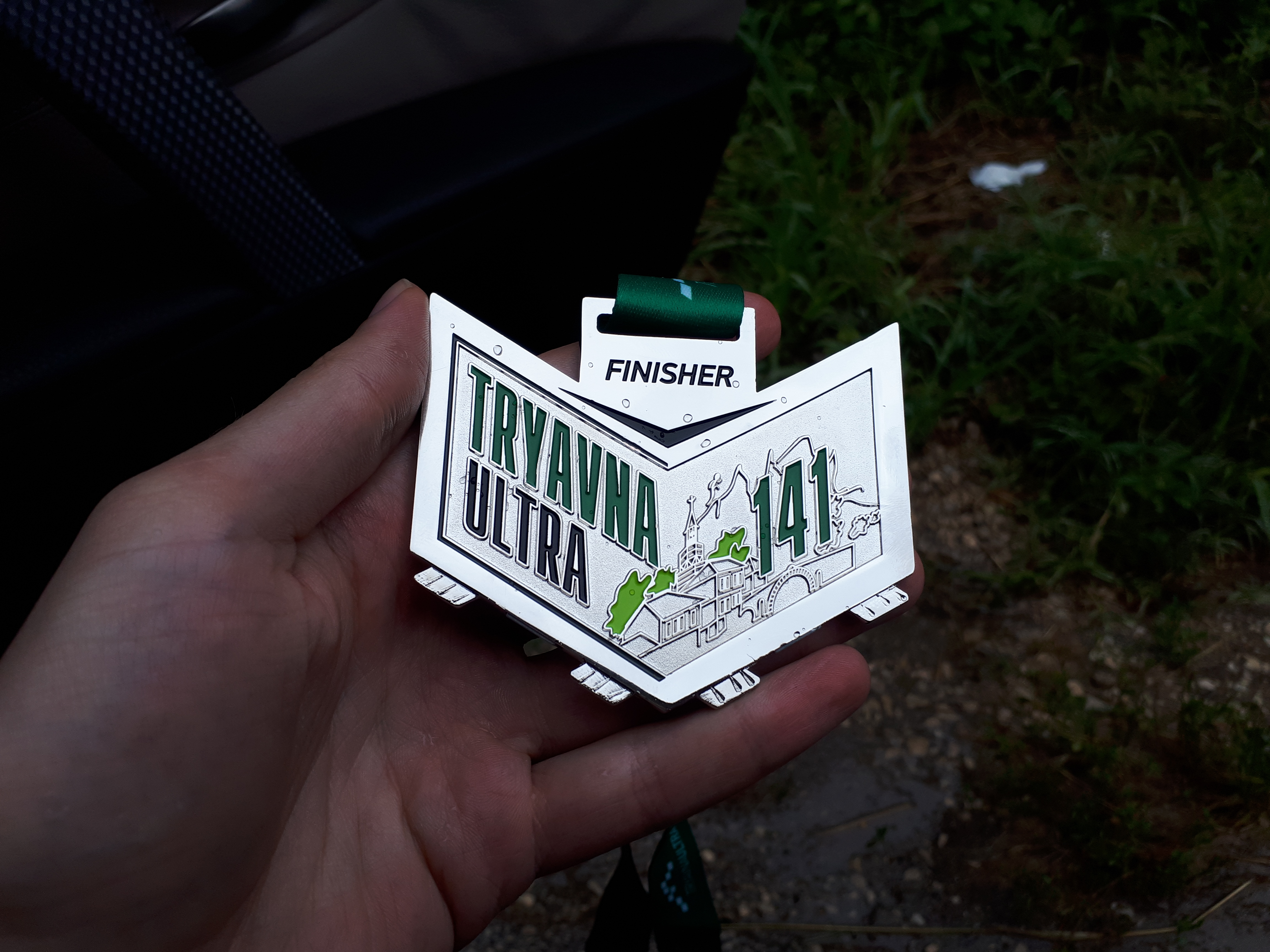
A medal for every finisher in Tryavna Ultra marathon

141 km

Year	Champion (m)	Nationality	Time	Champion (f)	Nationality	Time
2017	Rosen Rusev	(Bulgaria)	17:49:03	Desislava Tsvetanova	(Bulgaria)	25:24:30
2016	Ivaylo Hadzhiev	(Bulgaria)	20:25:30	Antoniya Grigorova	(Bulgaria)	26:10:54

76 km

Year	Champion (m)	Nationality	Time	Champion (f)	Nationality	Time
2017	Stanimir Dimitrov	(Bulgaria)	07:44:00	Radosveta Simeonova	(Bulgaria)	07:52:30
2016	Miroslav Spasov	(Bulgaria)	07:22:36	Tonya Tsvyatkova	(Bulgaria)	09:11:47

23 km

Year	Champion (m)	Nationality	Time	Champion (f)	Nationality	Time
2017	Valentin Paskalev	(Bulgaria)	01:36:34	Tanya Dimitrova	(Bulgaria)	01:47:20
2016	Valentin Paskalev	(Bulgaria)	01:38:11	Ilinca Maria Tempeanu	(Romania)	02:02:47
