= Mabompré =

Mabompré Måbompré (Walloon)
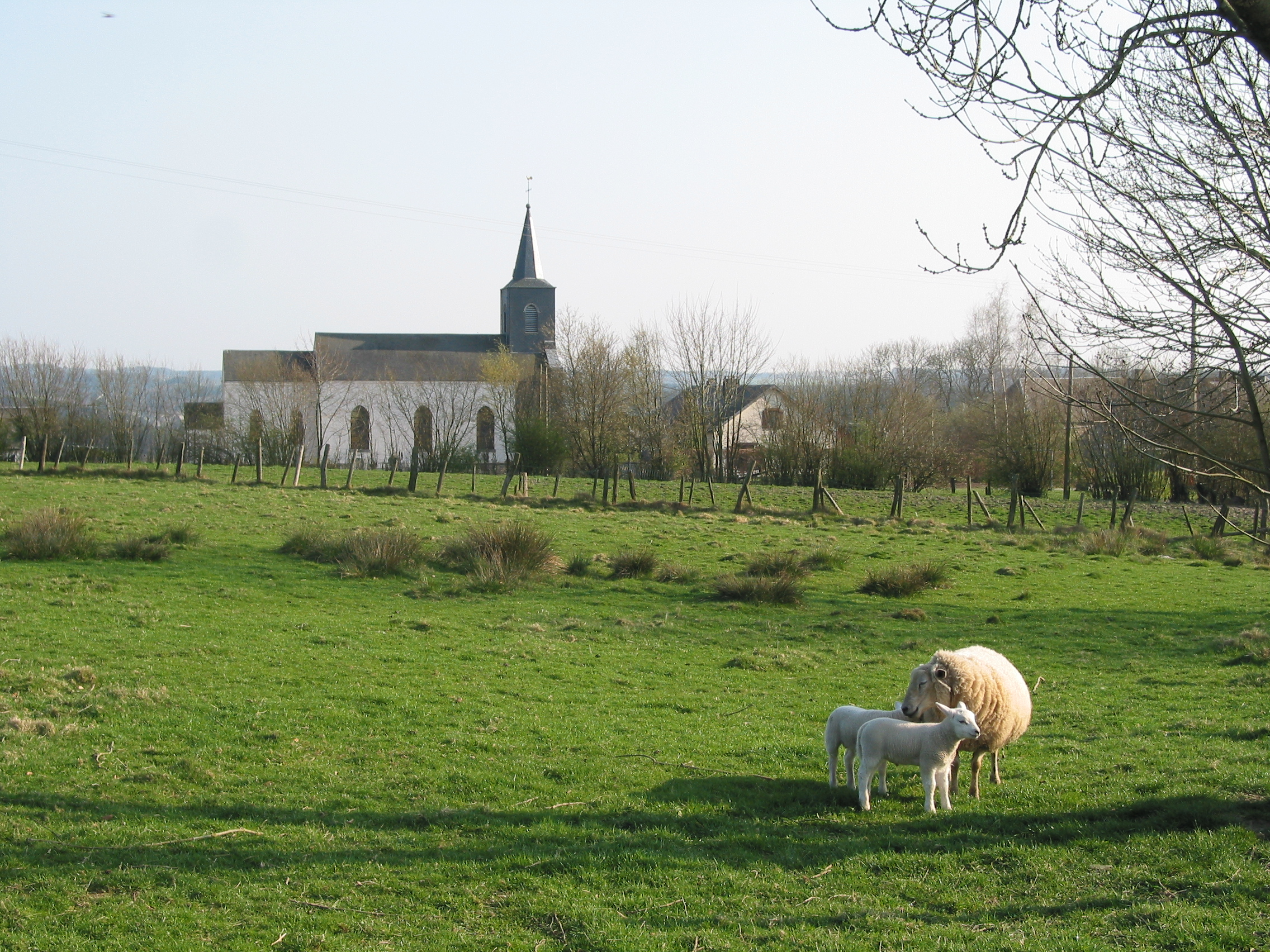
- The area of the Church of Saint-Martin

- Location in Belgium
- Coordinates: 50.0989°N 5.7392°E
- Country: Belgium
- Region: Wallonia
- Province: Luxembourg
- Municipality: Houffalize
- Postal codes: 6663
- Area codes: 061

Mabompré (French pronunciation: [mabɔ̃pʁe]; Walloon: Måbompré) is a village of Wallonia and a district of the municipality of Houffalize, located in the province of Luxembourg, Belgium.

It was a municipality until 1977.

== History ==
Under the French regime, Mabompré fused with Randoux.

In 1823, it fused with the municipality of Vellereux, which at the same time under the French regime fused with Bonnerue, Engreux, Rafsaday, Rensiwez and Spitanche.

== People ==
- Albin-Georges Terrien set the plots of his novels in the villages of Bonnerue and Engreux.
