= Nadrin =

Nadrin Nådrin (Walloon)
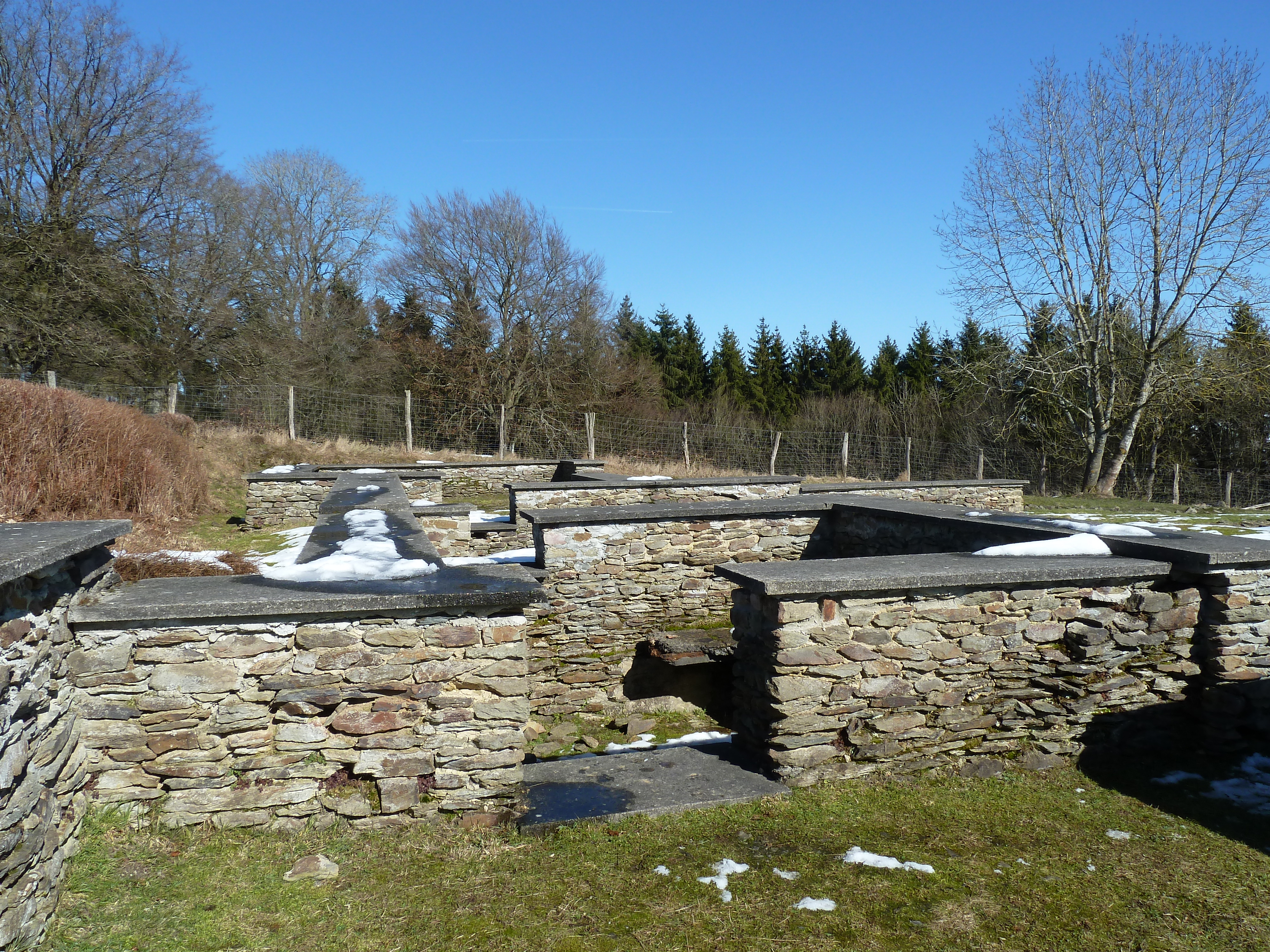
- Nadrin, archeological site with remains of a Roman villa

- Location in Belgium Nadrin (Europe)
- Coordinates: 50°09′N 05°41′E
- Country: Belgium
- Region: Wallonia
- Province: Luxembourg
- Municipality: Houffalize

Nadrin (French pronunciation: [nadʁɛ̃]; Walloon: Nådrin) is a village of Wallonia and a district of the municipality of Houffalize, located in the province of Luxembourg, Belgium.

The village is situated in the valley of the river Ourthe. It contains several archaeological sites; both the site of a Celtic fortress and the remains of Roman villas.
