= Tryavna =

Tryavna Трявна
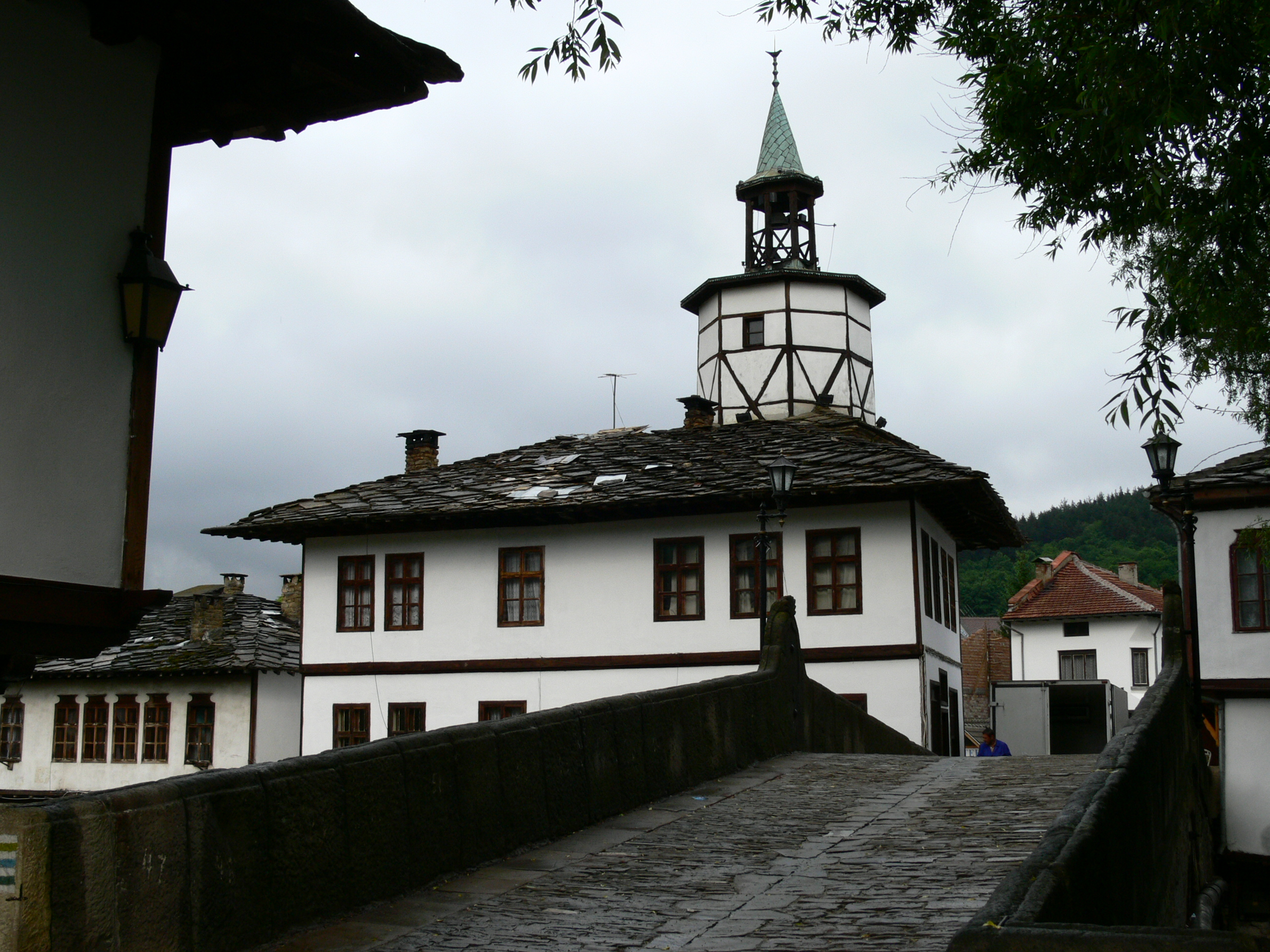
- Typical architecture of Tryavna.

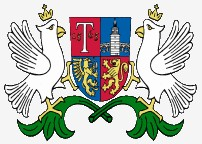
- Coat of arms

- Location of Tryavna
- Coordinates: 42°52′01″N 25°30′00″E
- Country: Bulgaria
- Province (Oblast): Gabrovo

Government
  - Mayor: Dencho Minev
- Elevation: 434 m (1,424 ft)

Population (2009-12-31)
  - City: 9,831
  - Urban: 11,978
- Time zone: UTC+2 (EET)
  - Summer (DST): UTC+3 (EEST)
- Postal Code: 5350
- Area code: 0677

Tryavna (Bulgarian: Трявна [ˈtrʲavnɐ])) is a town in central Bulgaria, situated on the northern slopes of the Balkan range, in the Tryavna river valley, near Gabrovo. It is famous for its textile industry and typical National Revival architecture, featuring 140 cultural monuments, museums, and expositions. Tryavna is the birthplace of Bulgarian writer Pencho Slaveykov and revolutionary Angel Kanchev.

The town is the administrative centre of the eponymous Tryavna Municipality. As of December 2009, it had a population of 9,831.

== History ==
The village was founded as early as the Thracian Era. However, the first documents of its existence date back to the 12th century. In 1190 it was the site of the Battle of Tryavna, which proved crucial in reestablishing Bulgarian independence from the Byzantines. During Ottoman Bulgaria period locals defended the pass and enjoyed privileges for this reason. Only Bulgarians lived in the town. During the period of Bulgarian National Revival, the town was heavily involved in the development of crafts. Houses from this period feature their own architectural design. The ground floors had irregular forms and housed craftsmen and traders. The upper floors featured wooden bow-windows, the roofs were covered with well-arranged rocks.

The town square, named Capitan Diado Nikola, with the clock tower, dating from 1814, are among the landmarks. Another tourist attraction is the "kivgireniyat" bridge, built above the river behind the clock tower. One of the first secular schools in Bulgaria was built on Capitan Diado Nikola Square. Another symbol of Tryavna is the St. Archangel Mihael Church, situated in the town center and built in the late 12th century after Bulgarian tzar Asen defeated Byzantine emperor Isaac II. The wood-carved iconostasis and the bishop's throne in the church are masterpieces of the woodcarving in Tryavna. Next to the school is the Raykov house with its ethnographic collection, which is the birthplace of the first Bulgarian chemist, Pencho Nikolov Raikov. Not far from it is the museum-house of Angel Kanchev who was Vassil Levski's compatriot. One of the most visited museums in Tryavna is the Daskalov house built in 1808. The museum features the famous wood-carved suns. The house is a museum of woodcarving and icon painting art. The remarkable ceilings were made after a bet between two of the best masters of wood carving — Dimitar Oshanetsa and Ivan Bochukovetsa. The two masters worked hard for six months in the two largest rooms in the house without having the possibility to see each other's work.

The Petko and Pencho Slaveykov museum-house, situated in the old part of the town, features an exposition of the poetic works of the two authors. Swedish academic Alfred Jensen proposed the name of the son, Pencho, for the Nobel Prize but he died before his nomination could be considered.

The Kalinchev house, also in the old part, has been transformed into an art gallery, offering the collection, donated by Totio Gybenski. The Museum of icon painting and woodcarving with its collection of over 160 original icons, painted by well-known masters, is housed in the Tsar's chapel at a distance of the town center.

The Museum of Asian and African Art is housed in the old public bath, on the riverside. Tryavna has samples of woodcarving, icon painting and original architecture.

Today the town is a preferred tourist spot, featuring modern hotels, private lodgings and villas, restaurants and taverns.

There is also an Art school where successors of the old icon painters and woodcarvers master these crafts.

The Voneshta voda village resort, famous for its healing mineral springs, is located 20 kilometres (12 miles) away from Tryavna. The Bulgarka Nature Park is located in the Starina Planina, south on the city.

The town is well connected with the whole country thanks to its road network and railway station.

Besides Bulgarian National Revival figures, another native is former Bulgarian NBA player Georgi Glouchkov.

== Population ==
Tryavna
Year	1946	1956	1965	1975	1985	1992	2001	2005	2007	2009
Population	4 355	5 965	9 690	12 532	12 909	12 491	11 131	10 393	10 160	9 831
Sources: National Statistical Institute, „Citypopulation.de“, „Pop-stat.mashke.org“

== Administrative partition ==
- Svetushka neighborhood
- Kachaun neighborhood
- Hitrevtsi

== Education ==
- National High School for Applied Arts "Tryavna School"
- Petko Slaveykov's School

== Sport ==
- FC Tryavna
- Basketball club Tryavna
- Tennis club Tryavna
- Tryavna Ultra
- HV HAMMER TRYAVNA

== Gallery ==
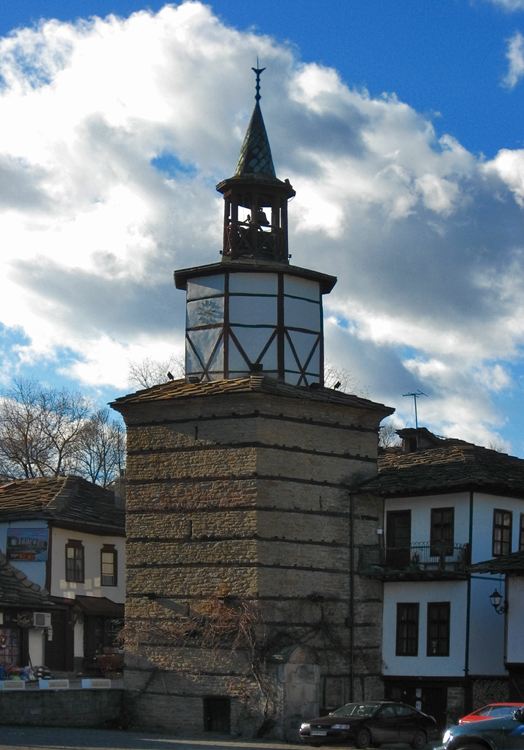

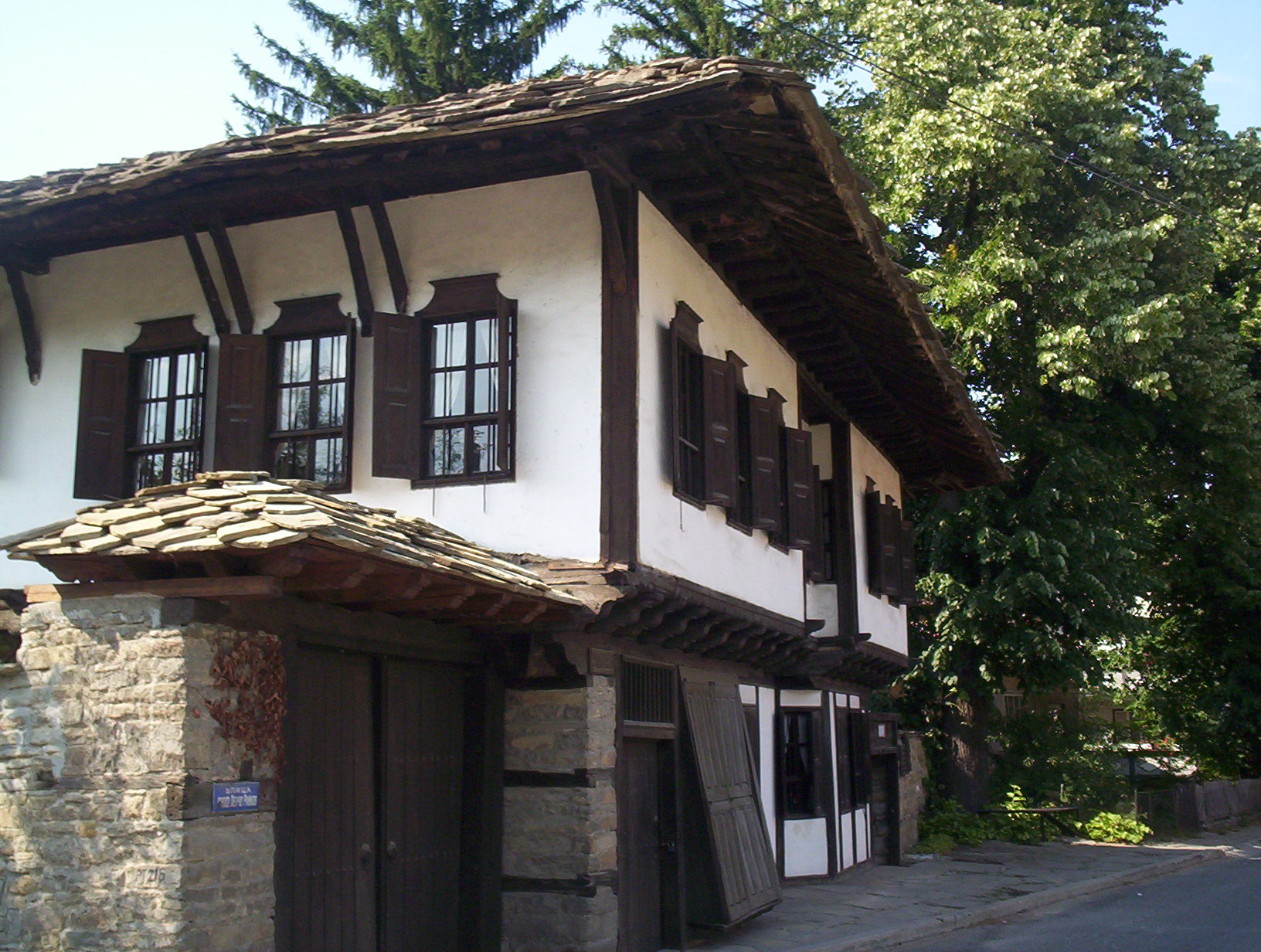

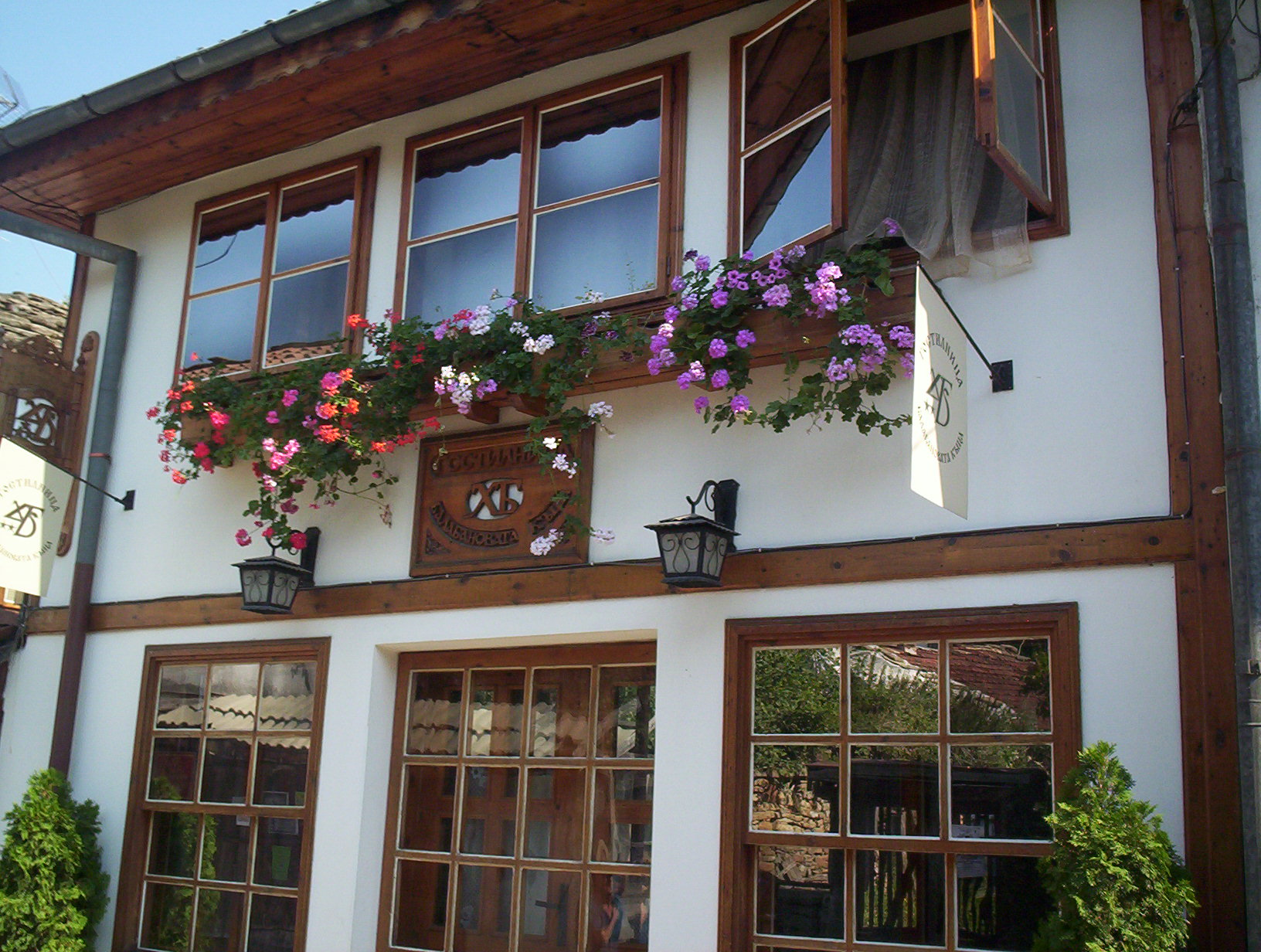

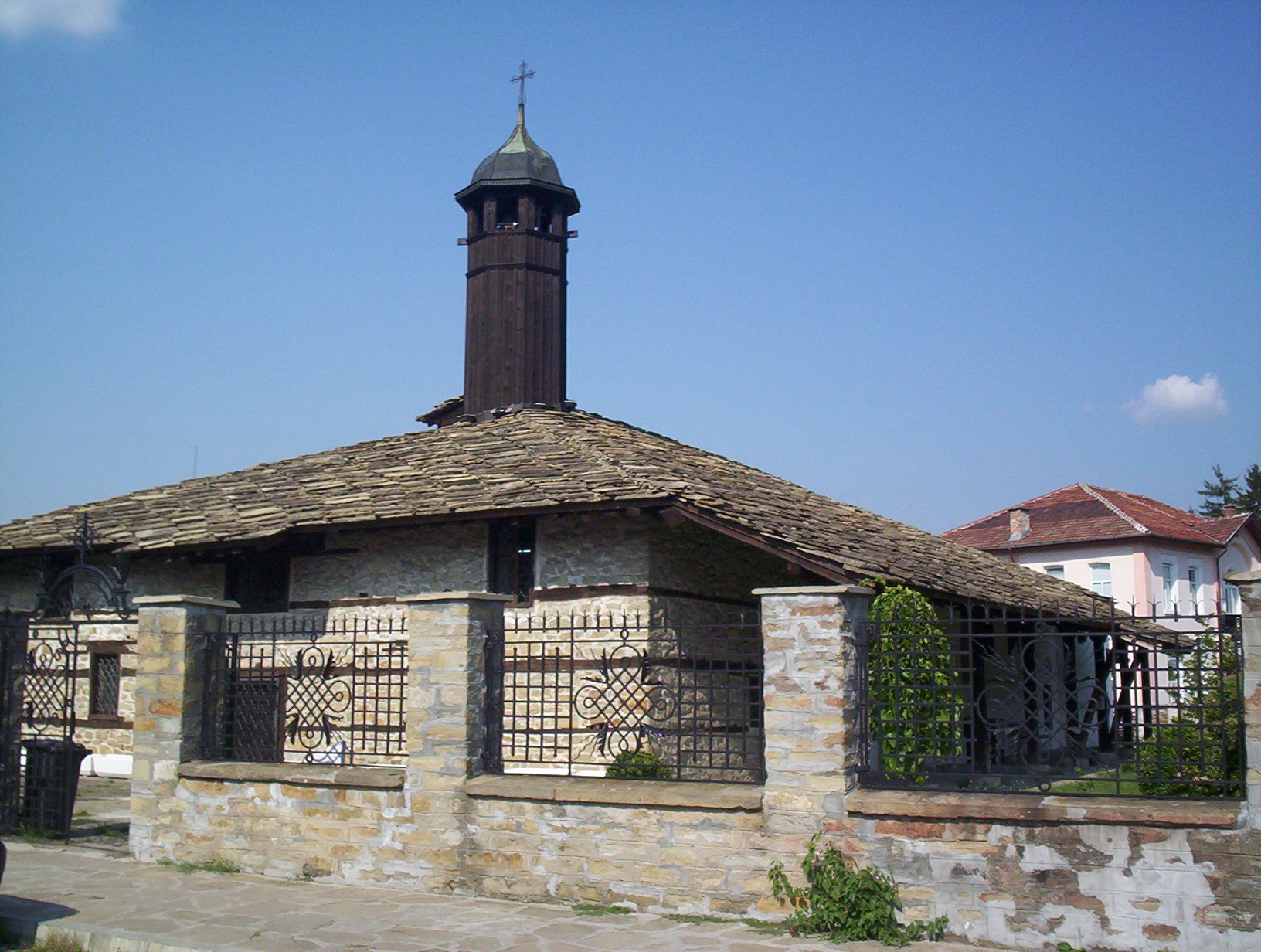

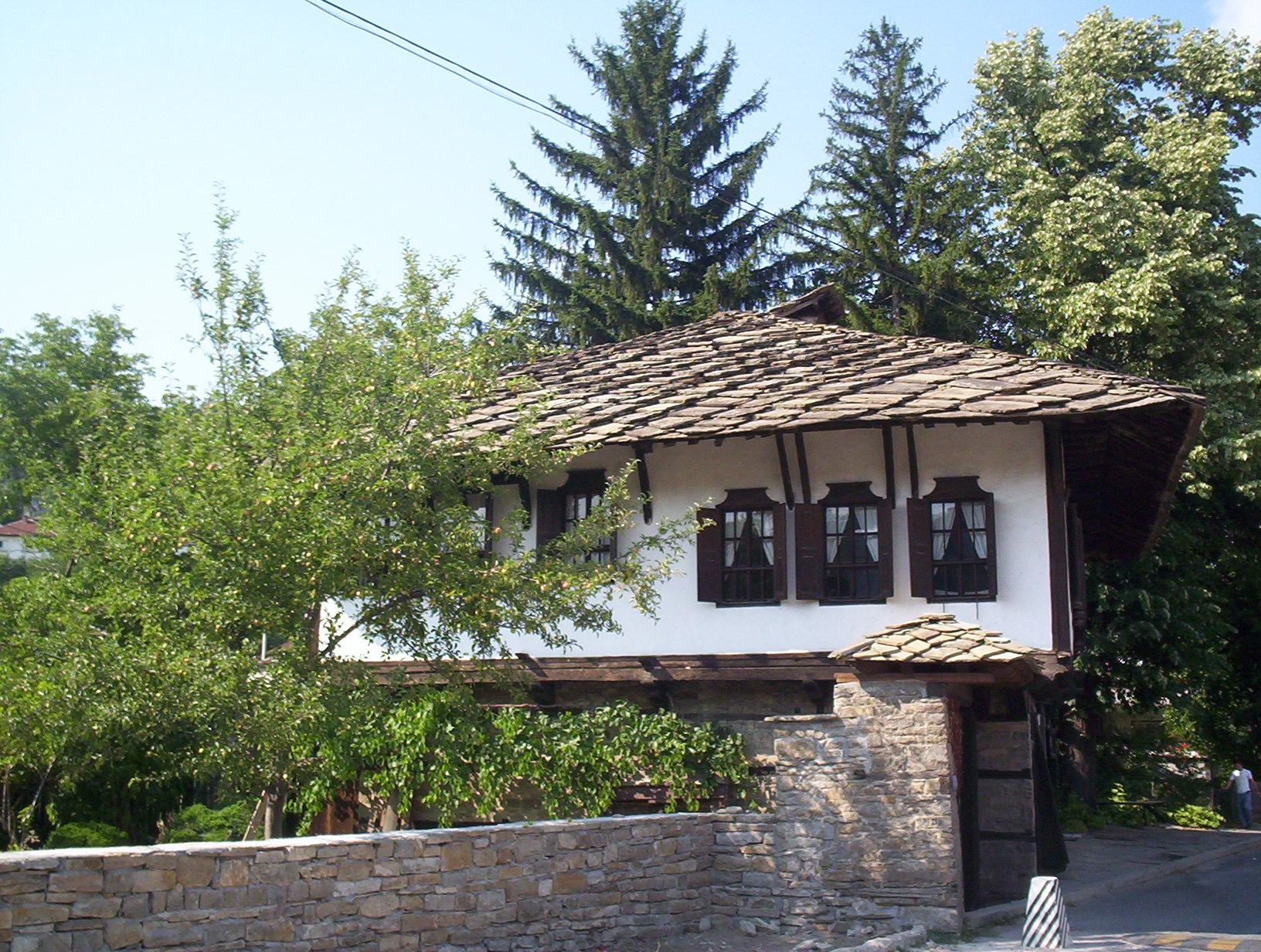

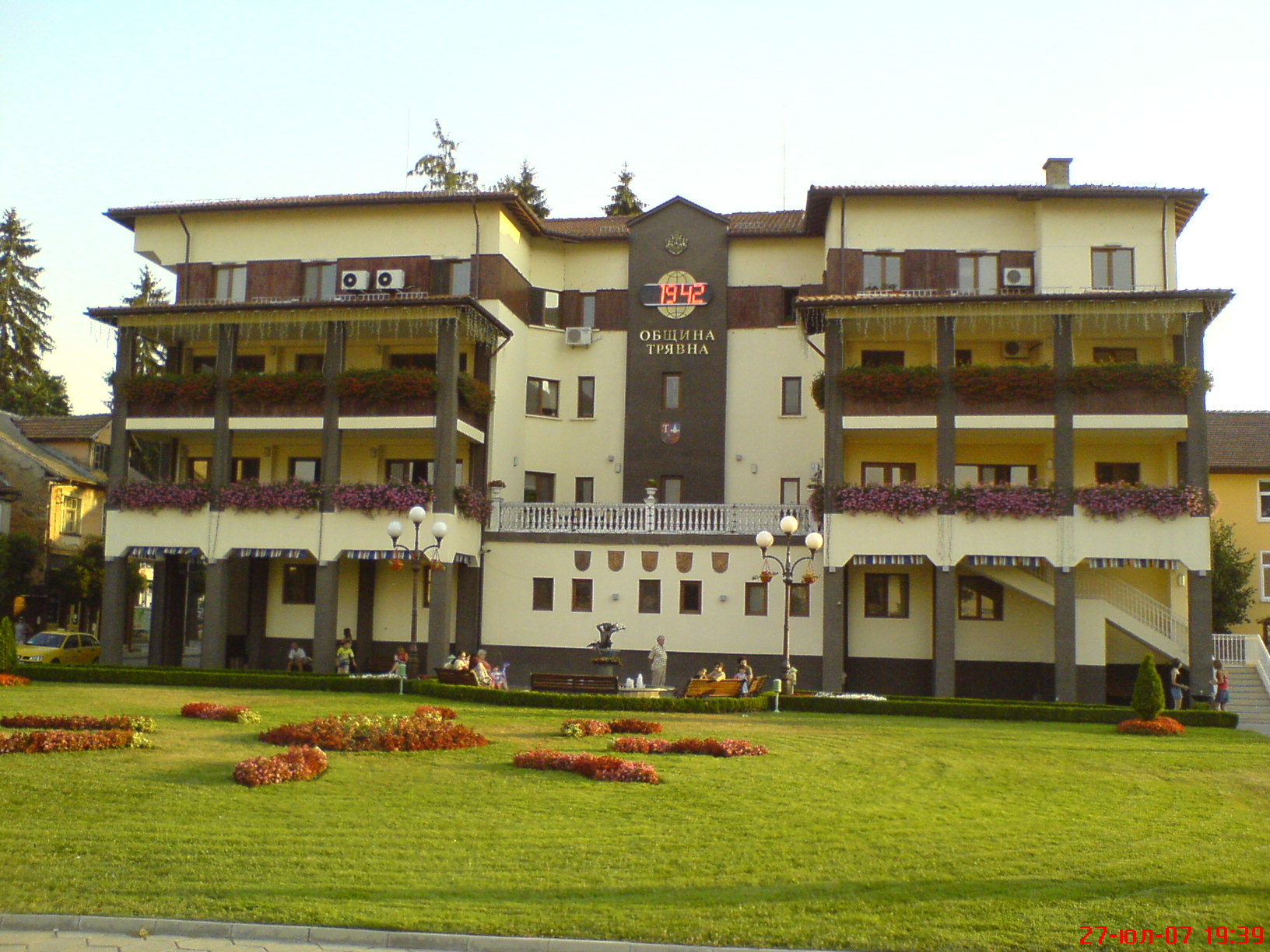

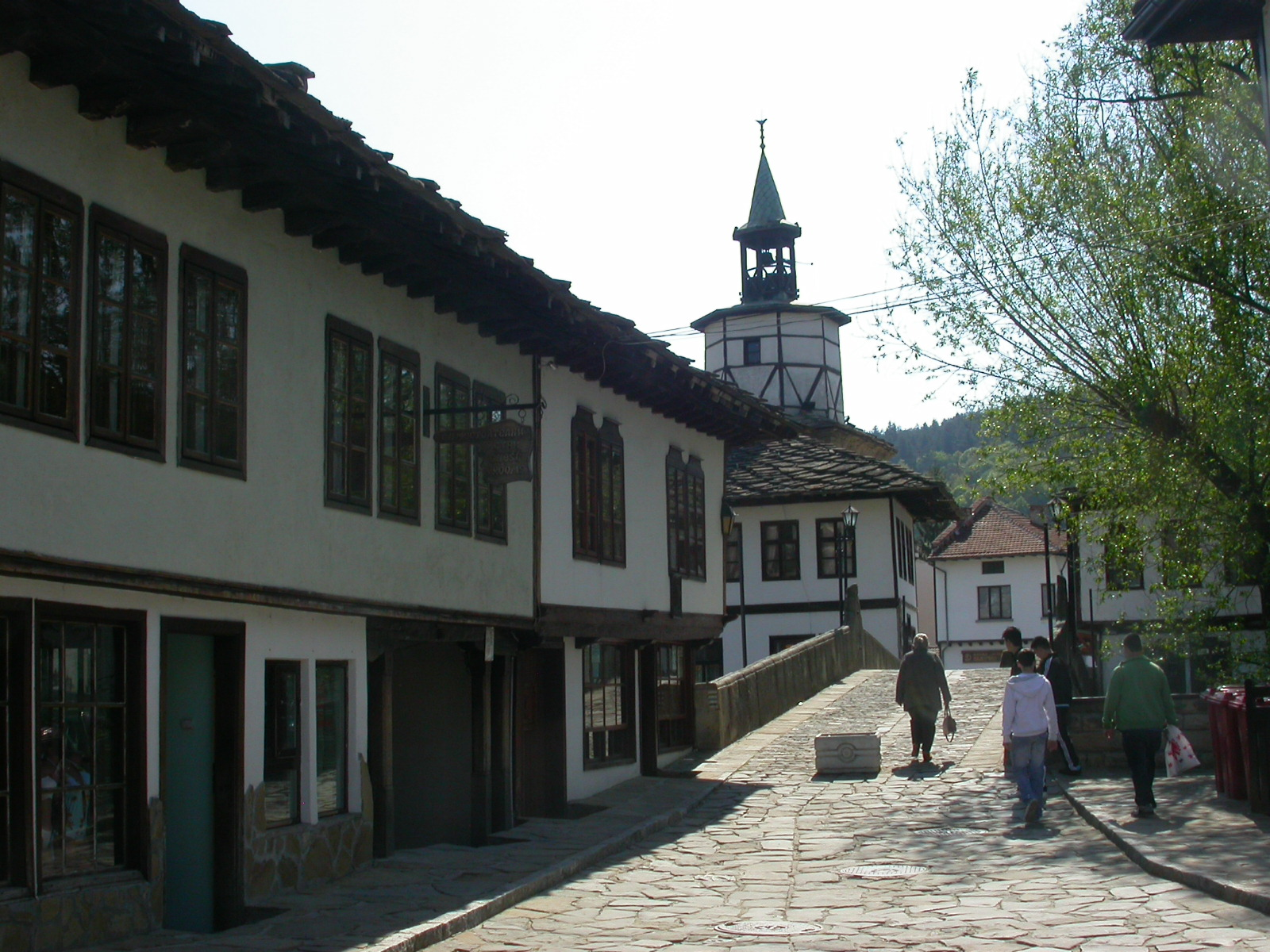

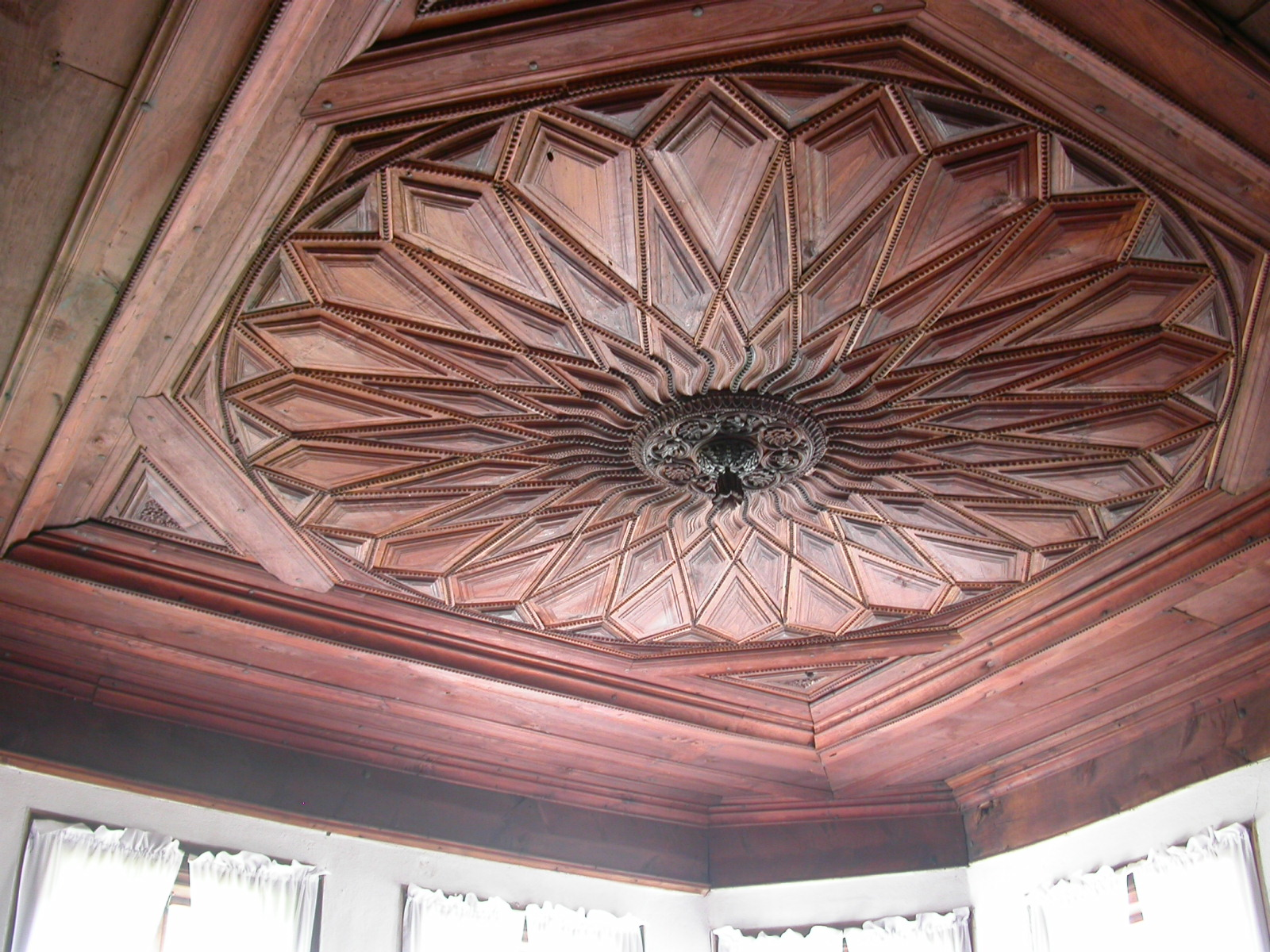

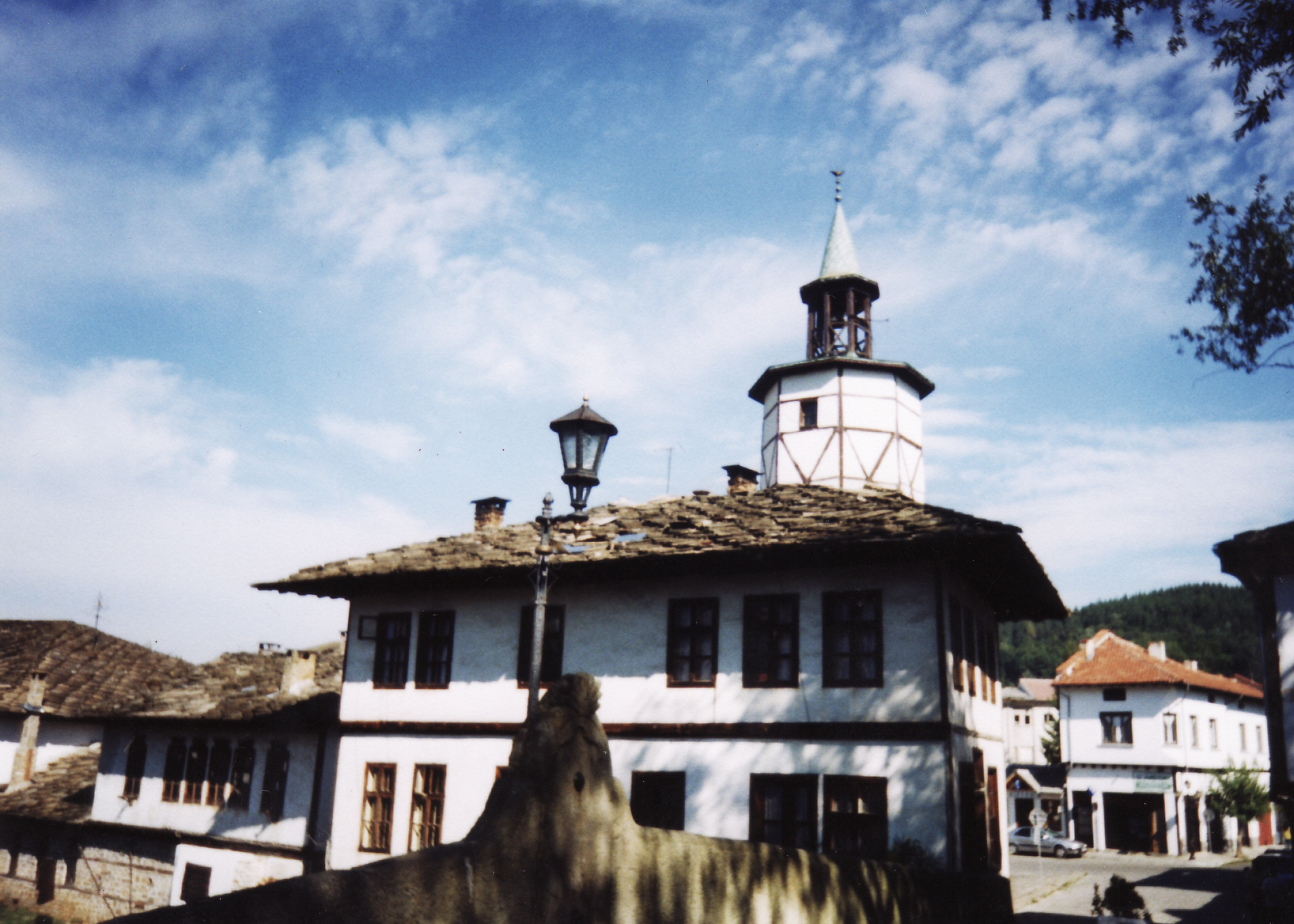

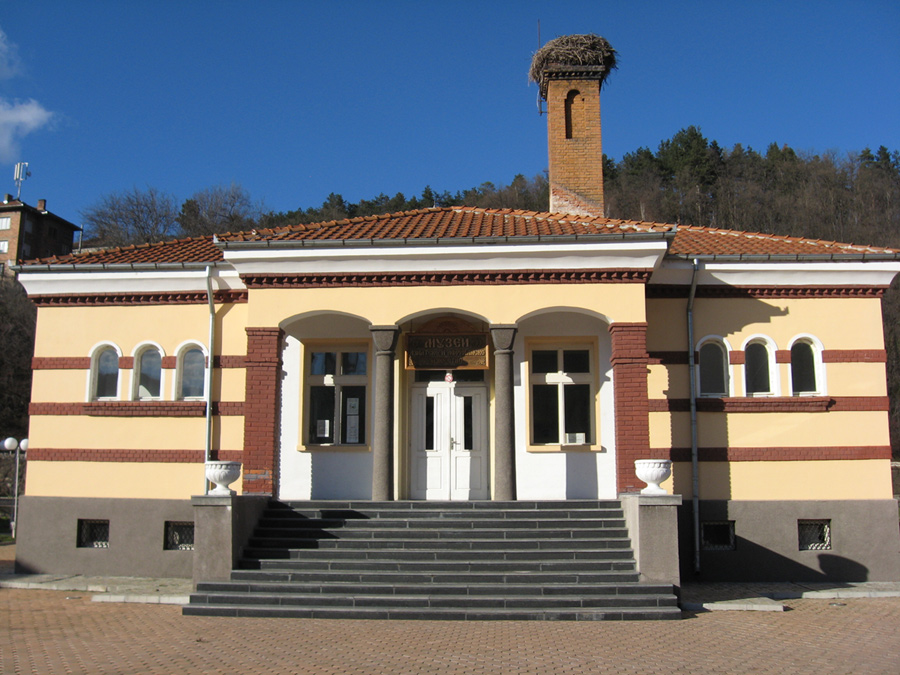

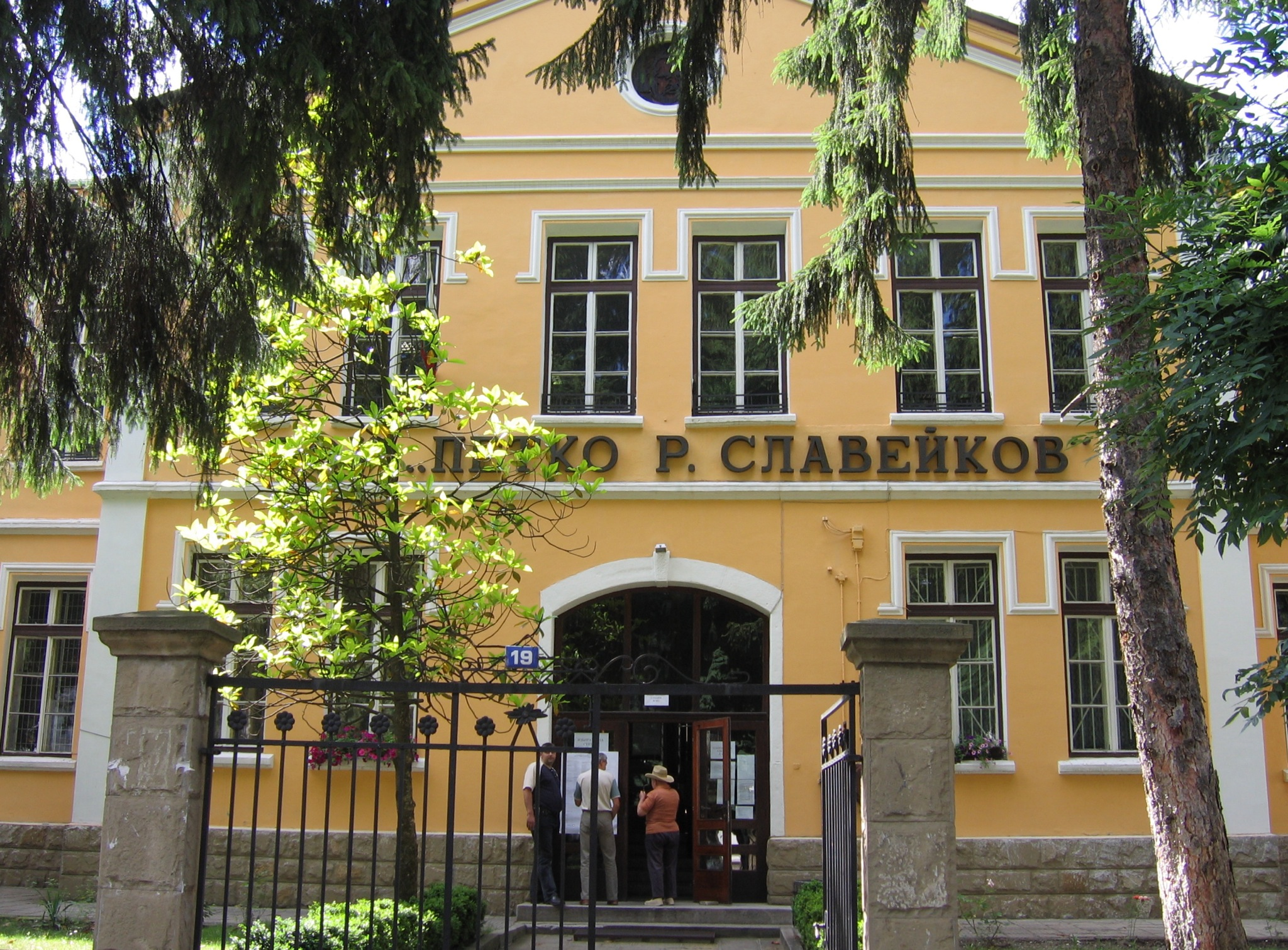

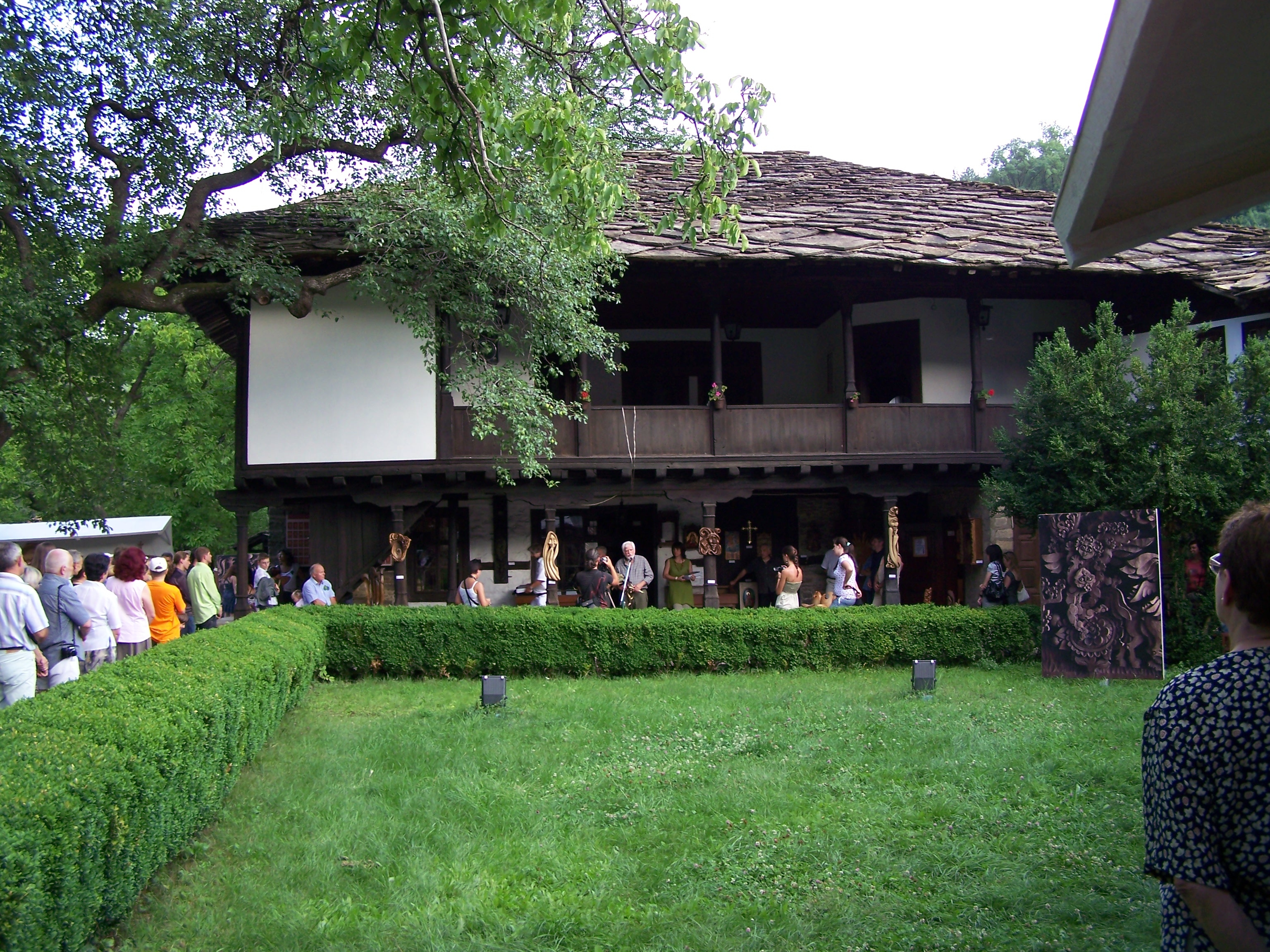

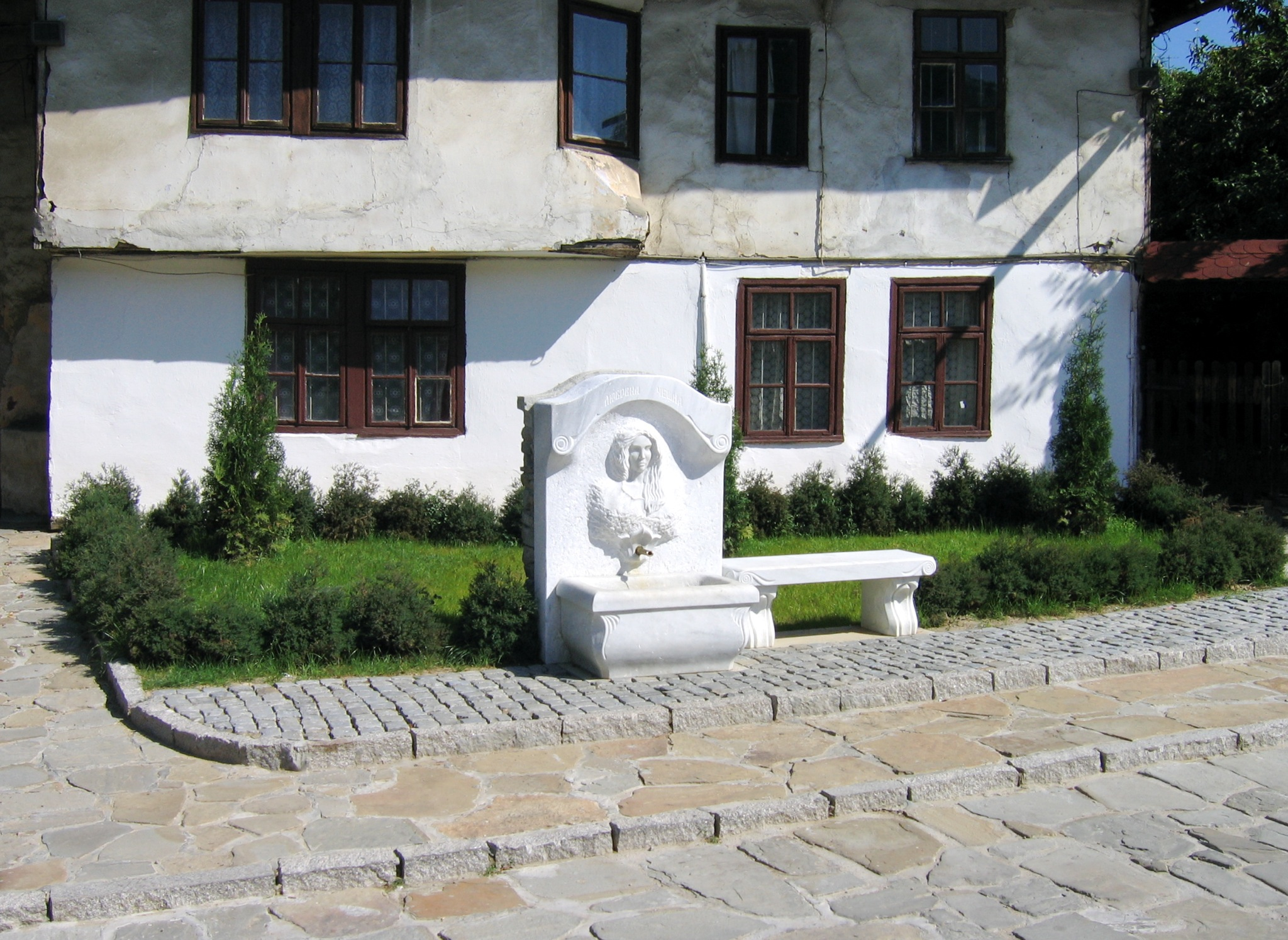

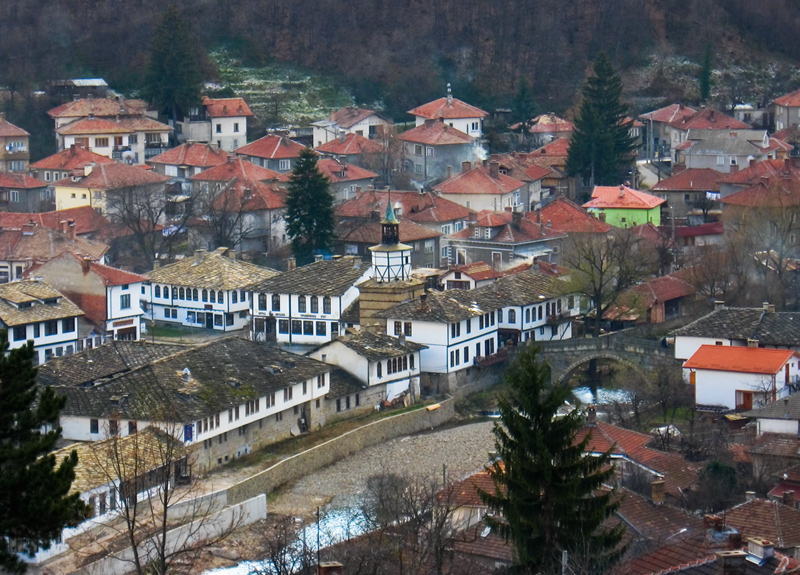

== International relations ==
=== Twin towns — Sister cities ===
Since 2011 Tryavna is a member of the Douzelage, a unique town twinning association of 27 towns across the European Union.

Altea, Spain
Bad Kötzting, Germany
Bellagio, Italy
(Republic of Ireland) Bundoran, Ireland
Granville, France
Holstebro, Denmark
Houffalize, Belgium
Meerssen, the Netherlands
Niederanven, Luxembourg
Preveza, Greece
Sesimbra, Portugal
Sherborne, United Kingdom
Karkkila, Finland
Oxelösund, Sweden
Judenburg, Austria
Chojna, Poland
Kőszeg, Hungary
Sigulda, Latvia
Sušice, Czech Republic
Türi, Estonia
Zvolen, Slovakia
Rokiškis, Lithuania
Marsaskala, Malta
Siret, Romania
Škofja Loka, Slovenia
Agros, Cyprus

Since 1994 Tryavna is also twinned with Brienz, Switzerland.

== Honour ==
Tryavna Peak on Livingston Island in the South Shetland Islands, Antarctica is named after Tryavna.

== See also ==
- Battles of the Russo-Turkish War (1877–1878)
- Bulgarka Nature Park
- Epic of the Forgotten by Ivan Vazov
- Etar Architectural-Ethnographic Complex
- Heroes of Shipka
- History of Bulgaria
- Gabrovo City
- Shipka Memorial
- Shipka Pass
