= Houffalize =

City in Wallonia, Belgium

Houffalize: Oufalijhe (Walloon); Hohenfels (German)
- City and municipality
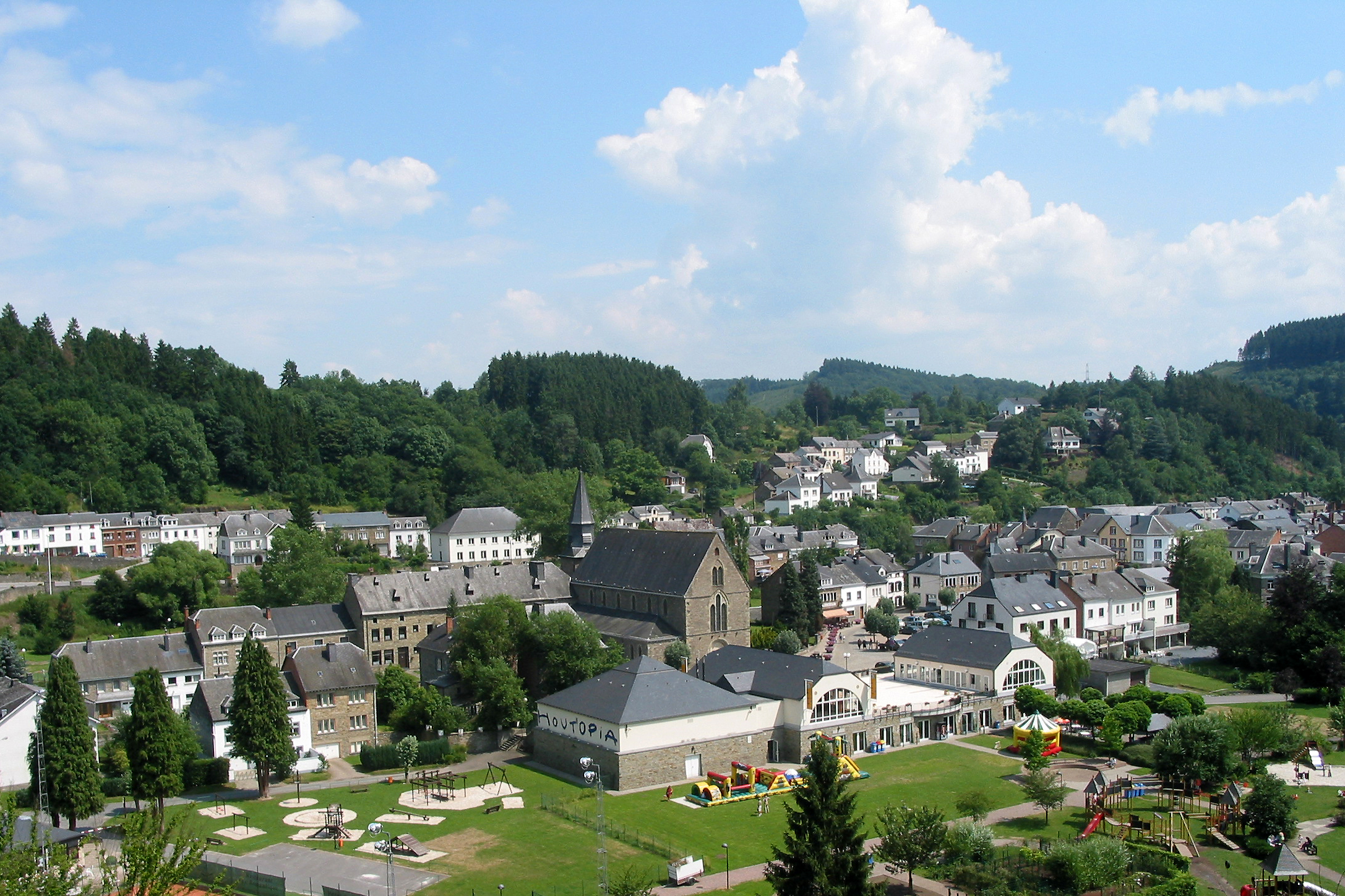
- Houffalize

- Flag Coat of arms

- Location of Houffalize in Luxembourg province
- Interactive map of Houffalize
- Location in Belgium
- Coordinates: 50°08′N 05°47′E
- Country: Belgium
- Community: French Community
- Region: Wallonia
- Province: Luxembourg
- Arrondissement: Bastogne

Government
  - Mayor: Marc Caprasse (cdH, G&S)
  - Governing parties: Gestion & Service (G&S)

Area
  - Total: 167.41 km^{2} (64.64 sq mi)

Population (2021-12-01)
  - Total: 5,244
  - Density: 31.32/km^{2} (81.13/sq mi)
- Postal codes: 6660, 6661, 6662, 6663, 6666
- NIS code: 82014
- Area codes: 061
- Website: houffalize.be

Houffalize (French pronunciation: [ufaliz]; German: Hohenfels; Walloon: Oufalijhe) is a city and municipality of Wallonia located in the province of Luxembourg, Belgium.

On 1 January 2007 the municipality, which covers 166.58 square kilometres (64.32 sq mi), had 4,802 inhabitants, giving a population density of 28.8 inhabitants per km^{2}.

The municipality consists of the following districts: Houffalize, Mabompré, Mont, Nadrin, Tailles, Tavigny, and Wibrin. Other population centers include Achouffe, Alboumont, Boeur, Bonnerue, Buret, Cetturu, Chabrehez, Cowan, Dinez, Engreux, Filly, Fontenaille, Mormont, Ollomont, Pisserotte, Sommerain, Taverneux, Vellereux, Vissoûle, Wandebourcy, and Wilogne.

== History ==
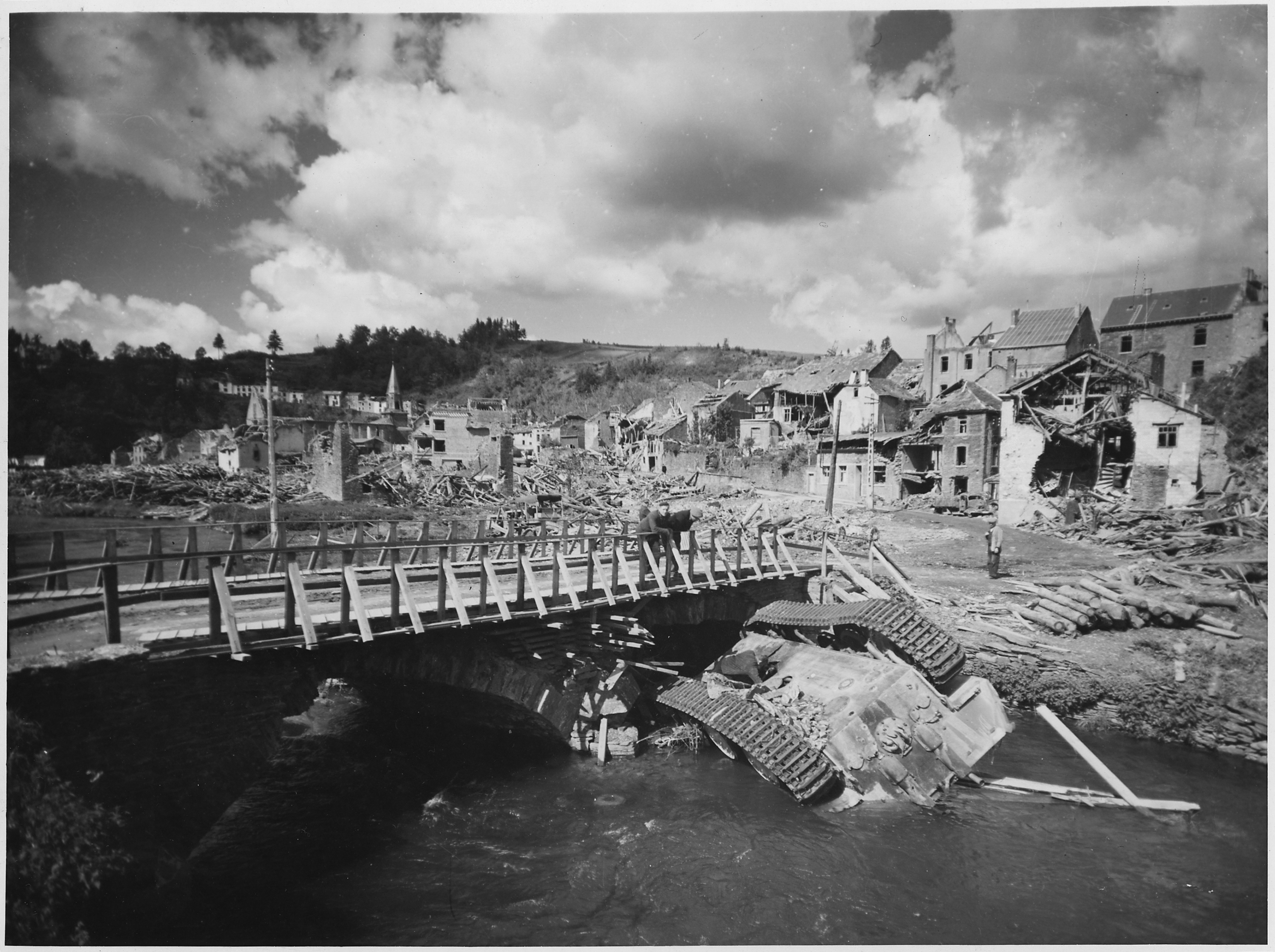
Ruins of Houffalize and an overturned German Panther tank settled in the River Ourthe, Houffalize, June 1945

Houffalize was a strategic location during the Battle of the Bulge of World War II. Specifically, Generals Montgomery and Patton met up here, Montgomery coming from the north and Patton from the south, in their counter-attack against the German forces remaining in the area. The town was flattened on the night of 5–6 January 1945 by ninety RAF Lancasters of Bomber Command to block the key crossroads for German supply columns and the escape route for German forces. Patton wrote a poem in his diary about the bombing.

== International relations ==
=== Twin towns - Sister cities ===
Houffalize is a founding member of the Douzelage, a unique town twinning association of 24 towns across the European Union. This active town twinning began in 1991 and there are regular events, such as a produce market from each of the other countries and festivals. Discussions regarding membership are also in hand with three further towns (Agros in Cyprus, Škofja Loka in Slovenia, and Tryavna in Bulgaria).

Altea, Spain - 1991
Bad Kötzting, Germany - 1991
Bellagio, Italy - 1991
(Republic of Ireland) Bundoran, Ireland - 1991
Granville, France - 1991
Holstebro, Denmark - 1991
Houffalize, Belgium - 1991
Meerssen, the Netherlands - 1991
Niederanven, Luxembourg - 1991
Preveza, Greece - 1991
Sesimbra, Portugal - 1991
Sherborne, United Kingdom - 1991
Karkkila, Finland - 1997
Oxelösund, Sweden - 1998
Judenburg, Austria - 1999
Chojna, Poland - 2004
Kőszeg, Hungary - 2004
Sigulda, Latvia - 2004
Sušice, Czech Republic - 2004
Türi, Estonia - 2004
Zvolen, Slovakia - 2007
Rokiškis, Lithuania - 2018
Marsaskala, Malta - 2009
Siret, Romania - 2010
Tryavna, Bulgaria - 2011

== See also ==
- List of protected heritage sites in Houffalize
- Brasserie d'Achouffe
