= Tryavna Peak =

Peak in the South Shetland Islands, Antarctica

Location of Tangra Mountains on Livingston Island in the South Shetland Islands.

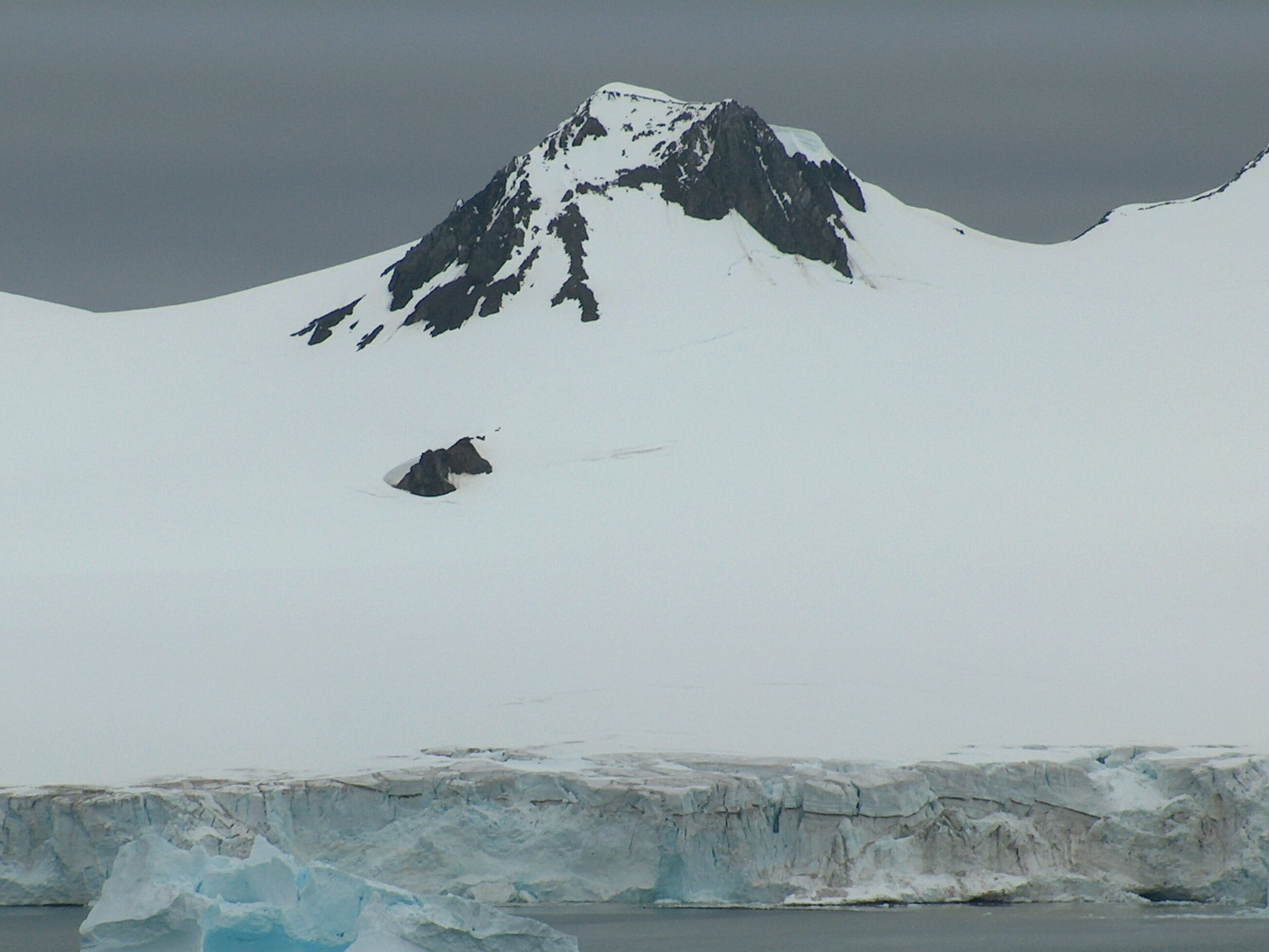
Tryavna Peak from Half Moon Island.

Topographic map of Livingston Island and Smith Island

Tryavna Peak (Bulgarian: връх Трявна, romanized: vrah Tryavna, IPA: [ˈvrɤx ˈtrʲavnɐ]) is a peak rising to 300 m in the Delchev Ridge of the Tangra Mountains of eastern Livingston Island in the South Shetland Islands, Antarctica. The peak surmounts Sopot Ice Piedmont to the north and northwest. The feature is named after the Bulgarian town of Tryavna.

== Location ==
The peak is located at 62°37′20.8″S 59°50′43″W, which is 430 m northeast of Shabla Knoll, 930 m east of Kaloyan Nunatak and 630 m west-southwest of Mesta Peak.

== Maps ==
- L.L. Ivanov et al. Antarctica: Livingston Island and Greenwich Island, South Shetland Islands. Scale 1:100000 topographic map. Sofia: Antarctic Place-names Commission of Bulgaria, 2005.
- L.L. Ivanov. Antarctica: Livingston Island and Greenwich, Robert, Snow and Smith Islands. Scale 1:120000 topographic map. Troyan: Manfred Wörner Foundation, 2010. ISBN 978-954-92032-9-5 (First edition 2009. ISBN 978-954-92032-6-4)
- Antarctic Digital Database (ADD). Scale 1:250000 topographic map of Antarctica. Scientific Committee on Antarctic Research (SCAR). Since 1993, regularly updated.
- L.L. Ivanov. Antarctica: Livingston Island and Smith Island. Scale 1:100000 topographic map. Manfred Wörner Foundation, 2017. ISBN 978-619-90008-3-0
