= List of protected heritage sites in Houffalize =

This table shows an overview of the protected heritage sites in the Walloon town Houffalize. This list is part of Belgium's national heritage.

Object	Year/architect	Town/section	Address	Coordinates	Number^{?}	Image
Church of Sainte-Catherine ^{(nl)} ^{(fr)}		Houffalize		50.133440°N 5.788968°E	82014-CLT-0001-01 Info	Kerk Sainte-Catherine
Old cemetery adjacent to the church of Sainte-Catherine ^{(nl)} ^{(fr)}		Houffalize		50.133326°N 5.788779°E	82014-CLT-0002-01 Info	
Tower of the church of Saint-Urbain de Dinez, tombstones, baptismal font, wall around the cemetery and the ensemble of the church, monuments, cemetery and surrounding areas ^{(nl)} ^{(fr)}		Houffalize	Mont-lez-Houffalize	50.168487°N 5.769024°E	82014-CLT-0003-01 Info	
Chapel Notre-Dame de Forêt and the ensemble of the chapel and the surrounding areas ^{(nl)} ^{(fr)}		Houffalize		50.151444°N 5.805740°E	82014-CLT-0004-01 Info	Kapel Notre-Dame de Forêt en het ensemble van de kapel en de omliggende terreinen
Site du Hérou, meanders of the Ourthe river ^{(nl)} ^{(fr)}		Houffalize		50.149259°N 5.648406°E	82014-CLT-0005-01 Info	
Tower and apse of the old Church of Sainte-Marguerite and the ensemble of the remaining parts of the church, the cemetery and the surrounding wall ^{(nl)} ^{(fr)}		Houffalize		50.155901°N 5.677454°E	82014-CLT-0006-01 Info	Toren en absis van de oude kerk Sainte-Marguerite en het ensemble van de resterende delen van de genoemde kerk, het kerkhof en de omringende muur
Church of Saint-Remy ^{(nl)} ^{(fr)}		Houffalize		50.108425°N 5.837788°E	82014-CLT-0008-01 Info	
Castle Tavigny ^{(nl)} ^{(fr)}		Houffalize		50.108491°N 5.839455°E	82014-CLT-0011-01 Info	Kasteel van Tavigny
Presbytery of Ollomont: facades and roofs, and the ensemble of the building and its surroundings ^{(nl)} ^{(fr)}		Houffalize		50.156161°N 5.677564°E	82014-CLT-0012-01 Info	
Tunnel of Bernistap, including the well and the ensemble of the tunnel and its surroundings ^{(nl)} ^{(fr)}		Houffalize		50.104510°N 5.869824°E	82014-CLT-0013-01 Info	Tunnel van Bernistap, inclusief de put en het ensemble van de tunnel en diens omgeving
Farm: interior and exterior, and its extensions: facades and roofs and bread oven, and the ensemble of these buildings and the surrounding areas ^{(nl)} ^{(fr)}		Houffalize	Filly n°4	50.146636°N 5.694171°E	82014-CLT-0014-01 Info	
Oak tree and environment ^{(nl)} ^{(fr)}		Houffalize	Mont	50.154172°N 5.767680°E	82014-CLT-0015-01 Info	
Chapel of Saint-Jacques, surrounding wall of the cemetery and funeral cross with slate, and the ensemble of the chapel and surrounding areas ^{(nl)} ^{(fr)}		Houffalize		50.158633°N 5.788567°E	82014-CLT-0016-01 Info	
Presbytery of Sommerain: totality of the building and the surrounding wall with the entrance on the street, and the ensemble of the parish and surrounding areas ^{(nl)} ^{(fr)}		Houffalize		50.159738°N 5.815191°E	82014-CLT-0017-01 Info	
Cowan Cemetery: surrounding walls and 25 old crosses, and the ensemble of the cemetery ^{(nl)} ^{(fr)}		Houffalize		50.112120°N 5.807544°E	82014-CLT-0018-01 Info	
Facades and roofs of the house Wilkin and the ensemble of the house, the garden and the ash tree, and an extension of the classification of the site of the tower and apse of the old church of Sainte-Marguerite, the cemetery and the surrounding wall, divided by royal decree of October 11, 1948 ^{(nl)} ^{(fr)}		Houffalize	n°31, Ollomont	50.155967°N 5.677506°E	82014-CLT-0019-01 Info	
Church of Saint Blaise, the crosses and surrounding walls of the cemetery ^{(nl)} ^{(fr)}		Houffalize		50.095870°N 5.722588°E	82014-CLT-0020-01 Info	
Farm adjacent to the castle of Tavigny ^{(nl)} ^{(fr)}		Houffalize	n° 32	50.108305°N 5.838281°E	82014-CLT-0021-01 Info	
Marsh of Grand Passage ^{(nl)} ^{(fr)}		Houffalize		50.232607°N 5.748364°E	82014-CLT-0022-01 Info	
Ensemble of the site of Cheslé and the valley of the Ourthe between Naboge and Nisramont and fortifications of Cheslé in Bérismenil and the old roads, and the ensemble of the meander of the Ourthe, within the reach of the 18th century Baltazar irrigation meadow, starting at the southern tip and along the banks and the riverbed to the ford of Hache. In addition, the creation of two conservation zones ^{(nl)} ^{(fr)}		Houffalize		50.169880°N 5.645180°E	82014-CLT-0023-01 Info	
Hérou site, meanders of the Ourthe ^{(nl)} ^{(fr)}		Houffalize		50.149259°N 5.648406°E	82014-PEX-0001-01 Info	
Ensemble of the tunnel of Bernistap and its surroundings ^{(nl)} ^{(fr)}		Houffalize		50.106559°N 5.862208°E	82014-PEX-0002-01 Info	
The marsh of Grand Passage ^{(nl)} ^{(fr)}		Houffalize		50.232607°N 5.748364°E	82014-PEX-0003-01 Info	
Ensemble of the site of the Cheslé and the valley of the Ourthe between Naboge and Nisramont ^{(nl)} ^{(fr)}		Houffalize		50.169880°N 5.645180°E	82014-PEX-0004-01 Info	

== See also ==
- List of protected heritage sites in Luxembourg (Belgium)
- Houffalize
