= Tavigny =

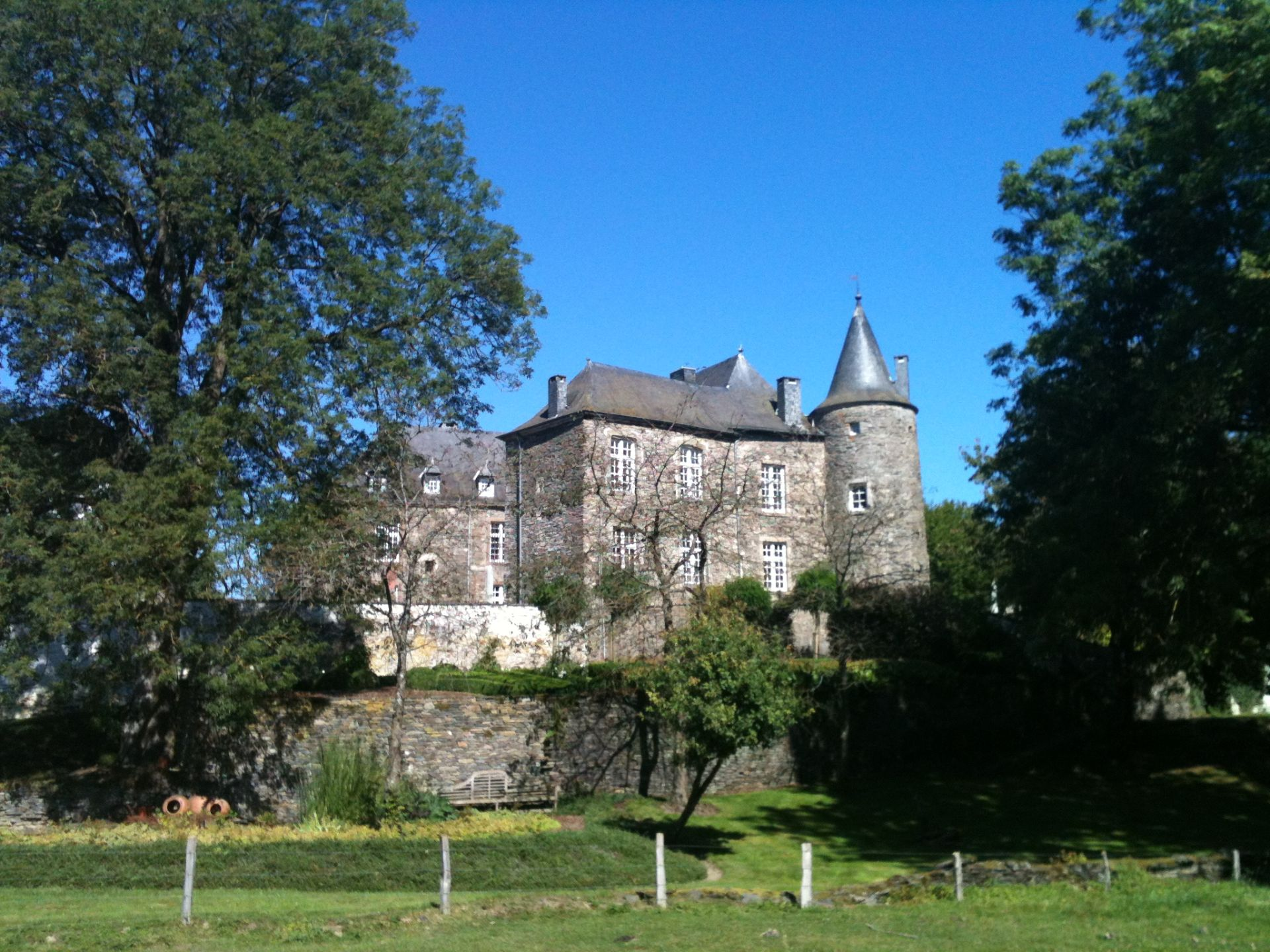
- Château de Tavigny

- Location in Belgium Tavigny (Europe)
- Coordinates: 50°06′N 05°50′E
- Country: Belgium
- Region: Wallonia
- Province: Luxembourg
- Municipality: Houffalize

Tavigny (French pronunciation: [taviɲi]) is a village of Wallonia and a district of the municipality of Houffalize, located in the province of Luxembourg, Belgium.

Remains of a Roman temple from the second century AD have been discovered in Tavigny, as well as remains of Roman villas. The Château de Tavigny dates from the Middle Ages, and by 1360 was owned by the locally powerful d'Ouren family.
