= Brasserie d'Achouffe =

Belgian brewery based in Achouffe

Coordinates: 50.1509°N 5.7456°E

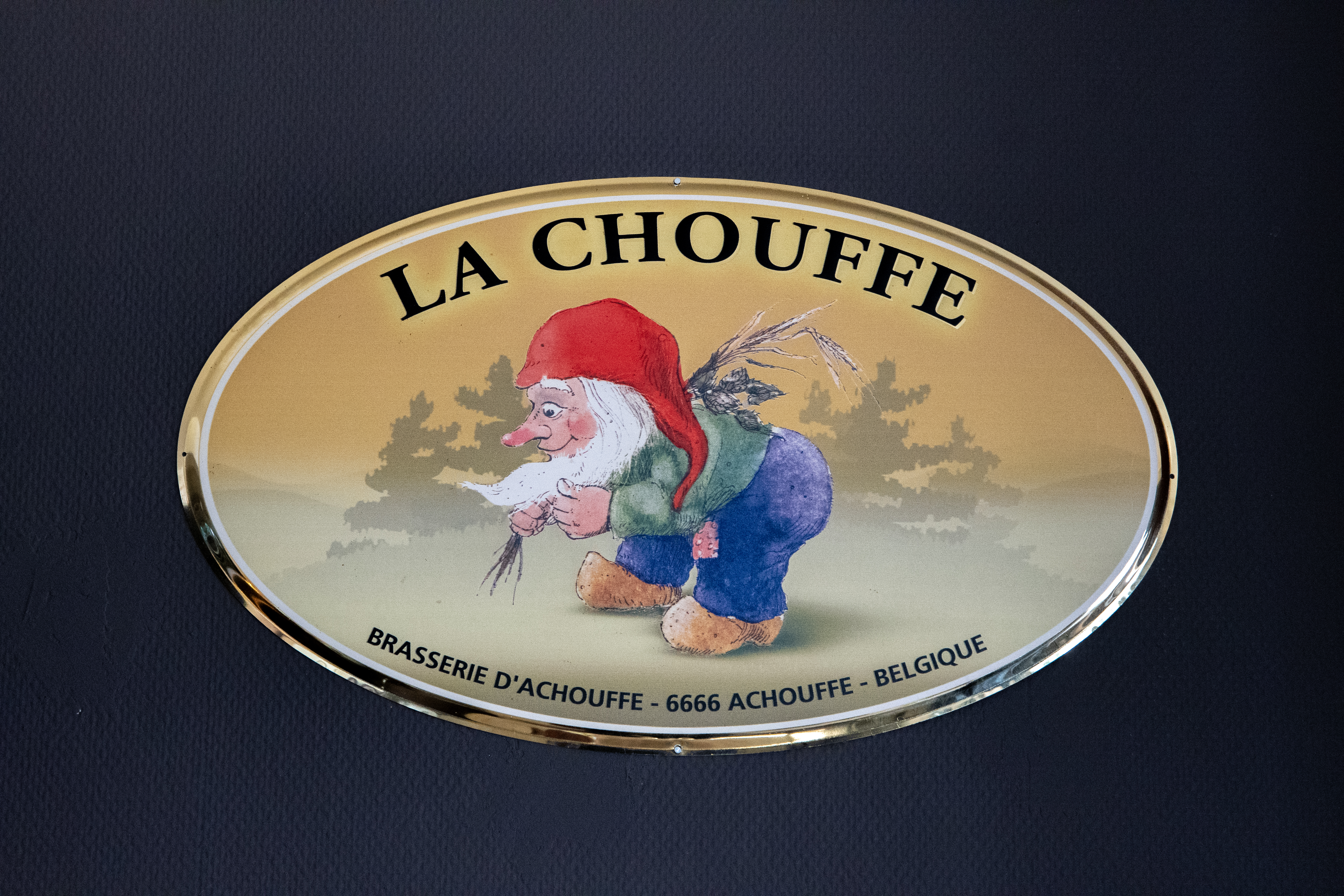
- Industry: Alcoholic beverage
- Founded: 1982
- Headquarters: Achouffe, Belgium
- Products: Beer
- Owner: Duvel Moortgat Brewery
- Website: www.achouffe.be

The Brasserie d'Achouffe (French pronunciation: [bʁasʁi daʃuf], lit. 'Brewery of Achouffe') is a Belgian brewery based in Achouffe, Luxembourg province. It was founded in 1982 by two brothers-in-law, Pierre Gobron and Christian Bauweraerts, as a hobby. In September 2006, the brewery was sold to the Duvel Moortgat brewery group.

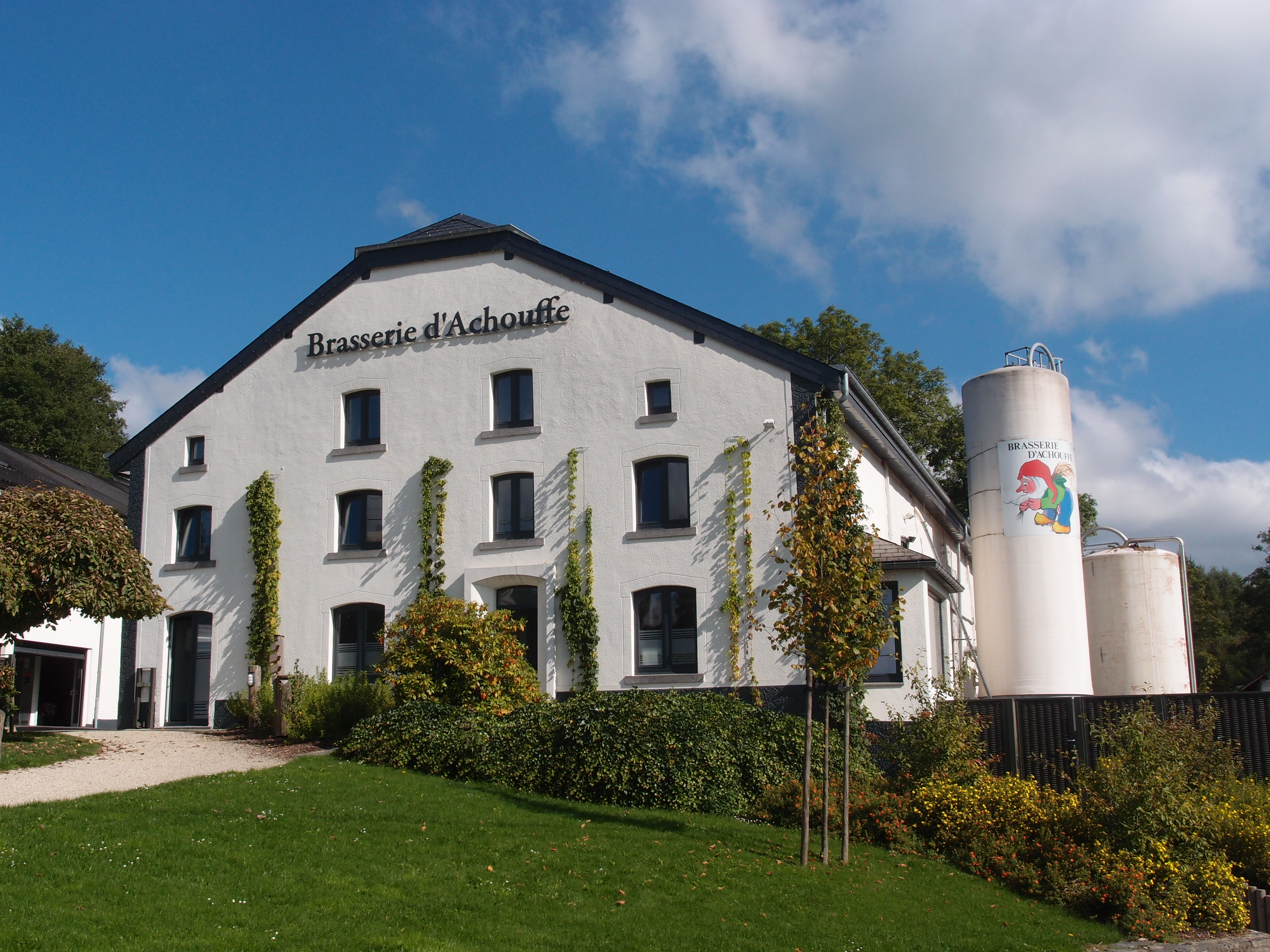
Brasserie d'Achouffe

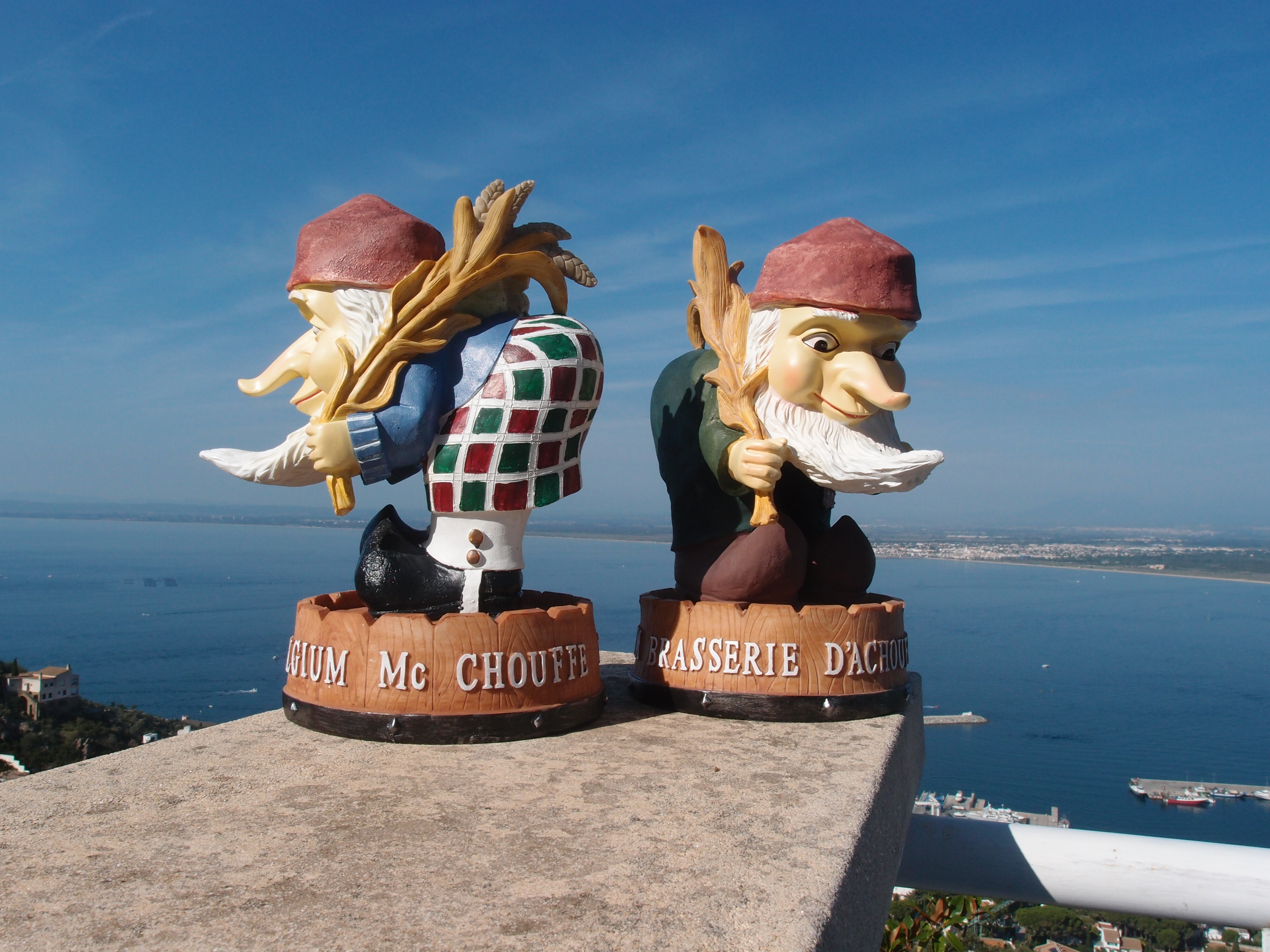
Chouffe gnomes

== History ==
In the late 1970s, the two brothers-in-law, Pierre Gobron and Chris Bauweraerts, decided to create their own beer, in their own brewery. On the 27th of August 1982, with less than 5,000Fr, they made the first 49-litre mash tub. Based on the legend of the Ardennes, a gnome was chosen as the company logo of the brewery. At first seen as a hobby, the Achouffe Brewery developed to such an extent that one after the other, Pierre and Chris decided work on it full time. They then decided to expand to the Netherlands. Drinkers who regularly enjoy the beer can usually be recognized by their 'Chouffewillo hat'. The annual La Grande Choufferie party, on the 2nd weekend of August, celebrates the birth of the Chouffe beer, in a convivial and musical atmosphere. In the late summer of 2006, Duvel Moortgat Brewery purchased the brewery.

== Sales ==
The brewery produces 300,000 hectoliters of beer a year, which it exports to 72 countries.

== Products ==
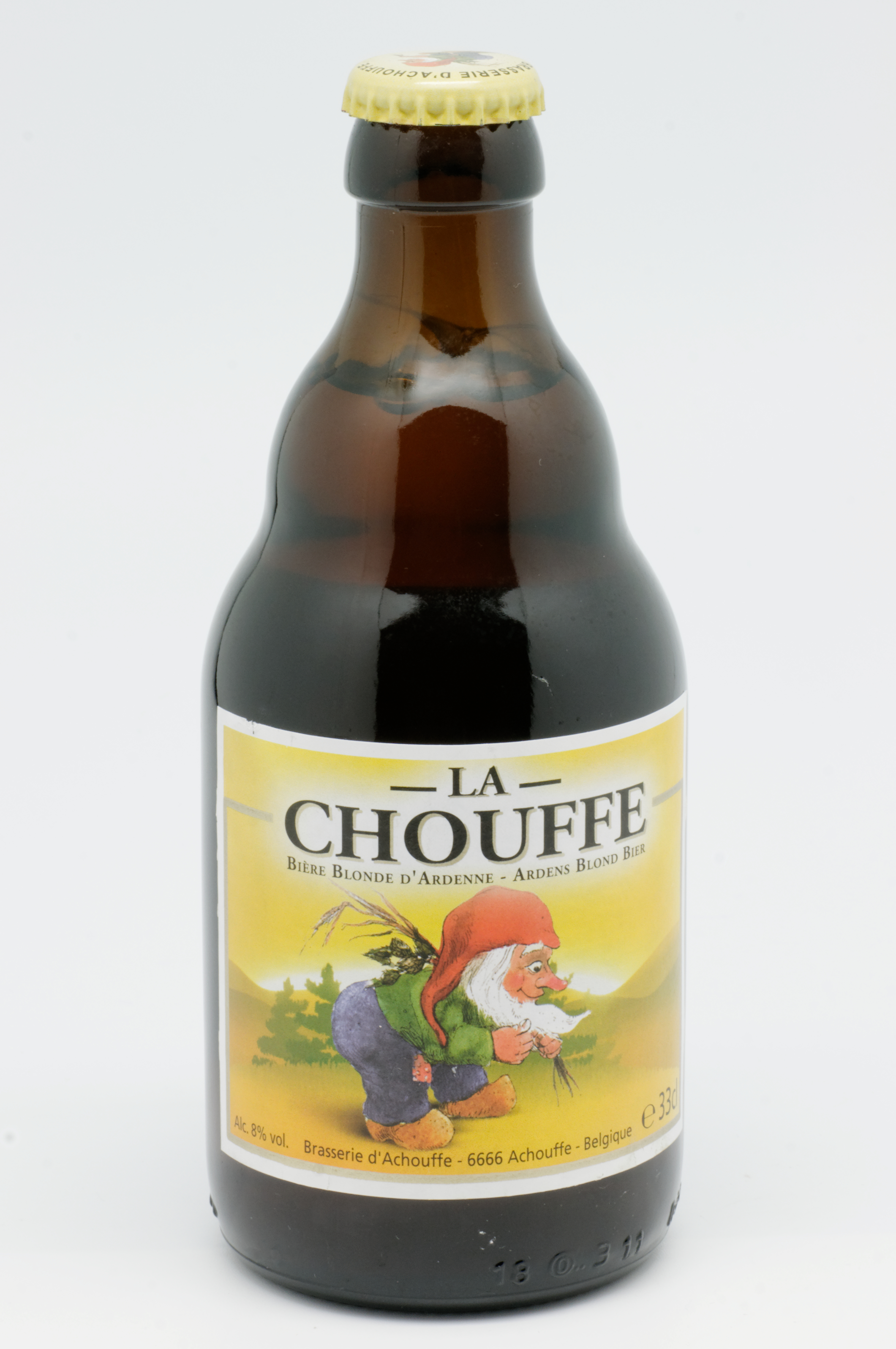
La Chouffe

Brasserie d'Achouffe produces several different beers, including:

- La Chouffe, a blond beer (8% ABV), available in 33cl and 75cl bottles, magnum (called "Big Chouffe") and 20l barrels.
- Mc Chouffe, a Belgian brown ale (brune or dubbel) 8.0% ABV), available in 33cl and 75cl bottles, and in 20l barrels.
- Houblon Chouffe, a heavily hopped ale (triple beer, 9% ABV), available in 33cl and 75cl bottles, and in 20l barrels.
- N'Ice Chouffe, a winter beer (brown, 10% ABV), available in 33cl and 75cl bottles or in 20l barrels.
- Chouffe Bok 6666, an amber ale known as bockbeer (6,66% ABV), available in autumn in 33cl and 75cl bottles and barrels, only available in the Netherlands.
- Chouffe Soleil, a seasonal beer, made during the summer (6% ABV).
- "Cherry Chouffe", a cherry flavoured ale (8%).

It also produces other beverages:

- Esprit d'Achouffe, an eau de vie distilled from 5-years-old beer (40% ABV)
- Chouffe Coffee, a liquor made from Esprit d'Achouffe (25% ABV)

Patachouffe is a Belgian cheese created following the success of Chouffe beers. There are also Marcachouffe sausages made in partnership with the Ardennes smoked sausage manufacturer Marcassou.

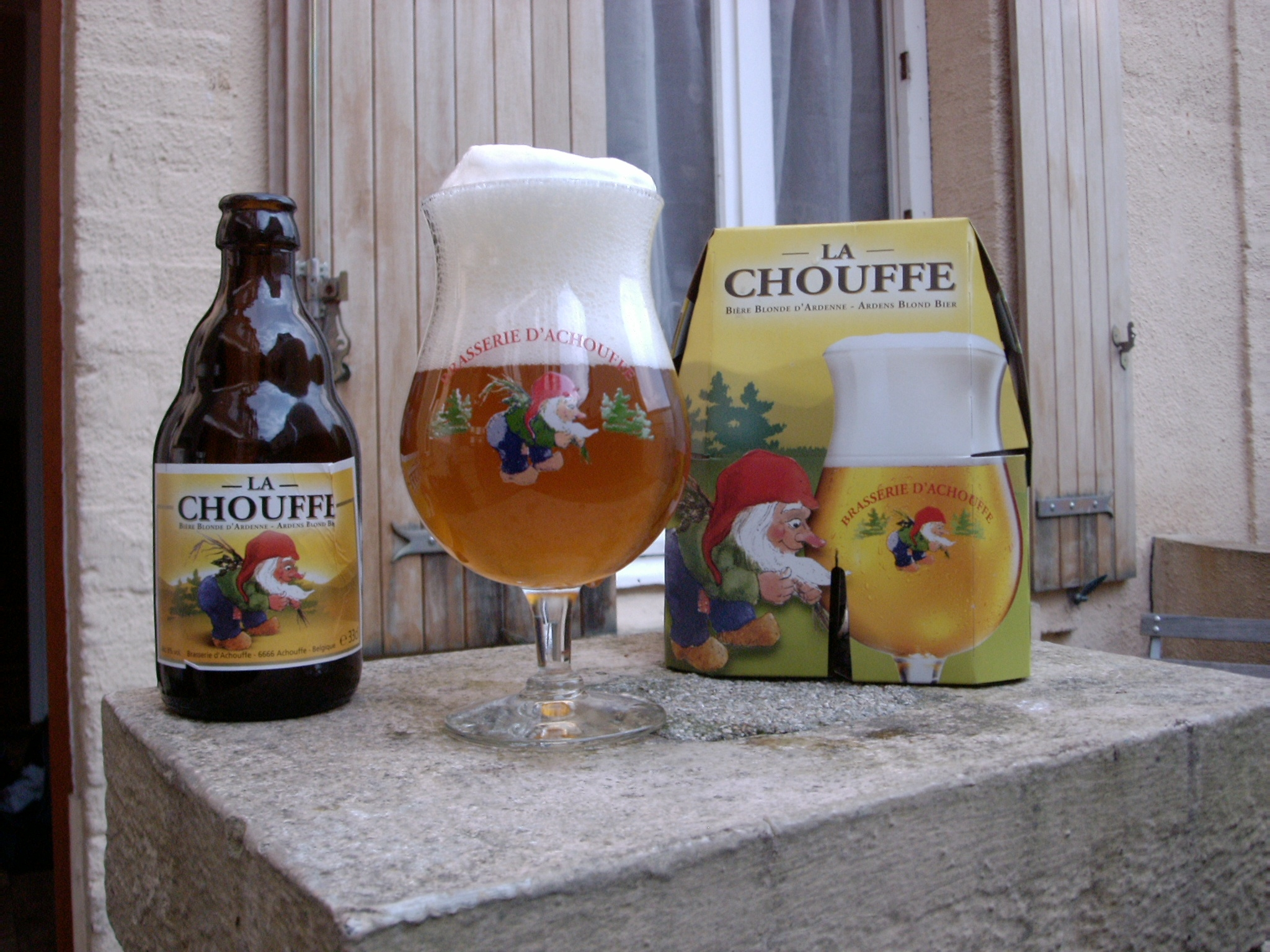
La Chouffe

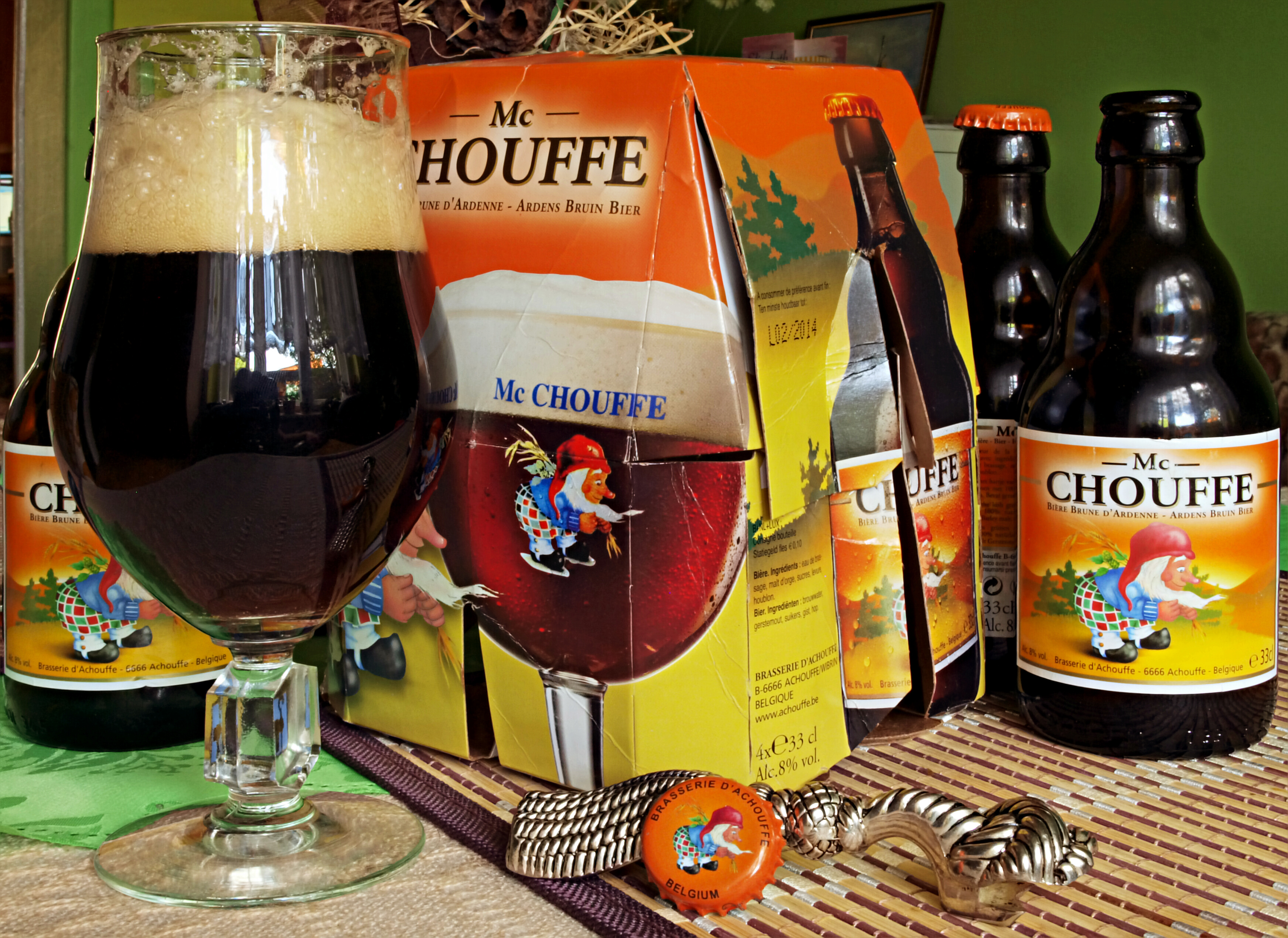
Mc Chouffe (Brown)

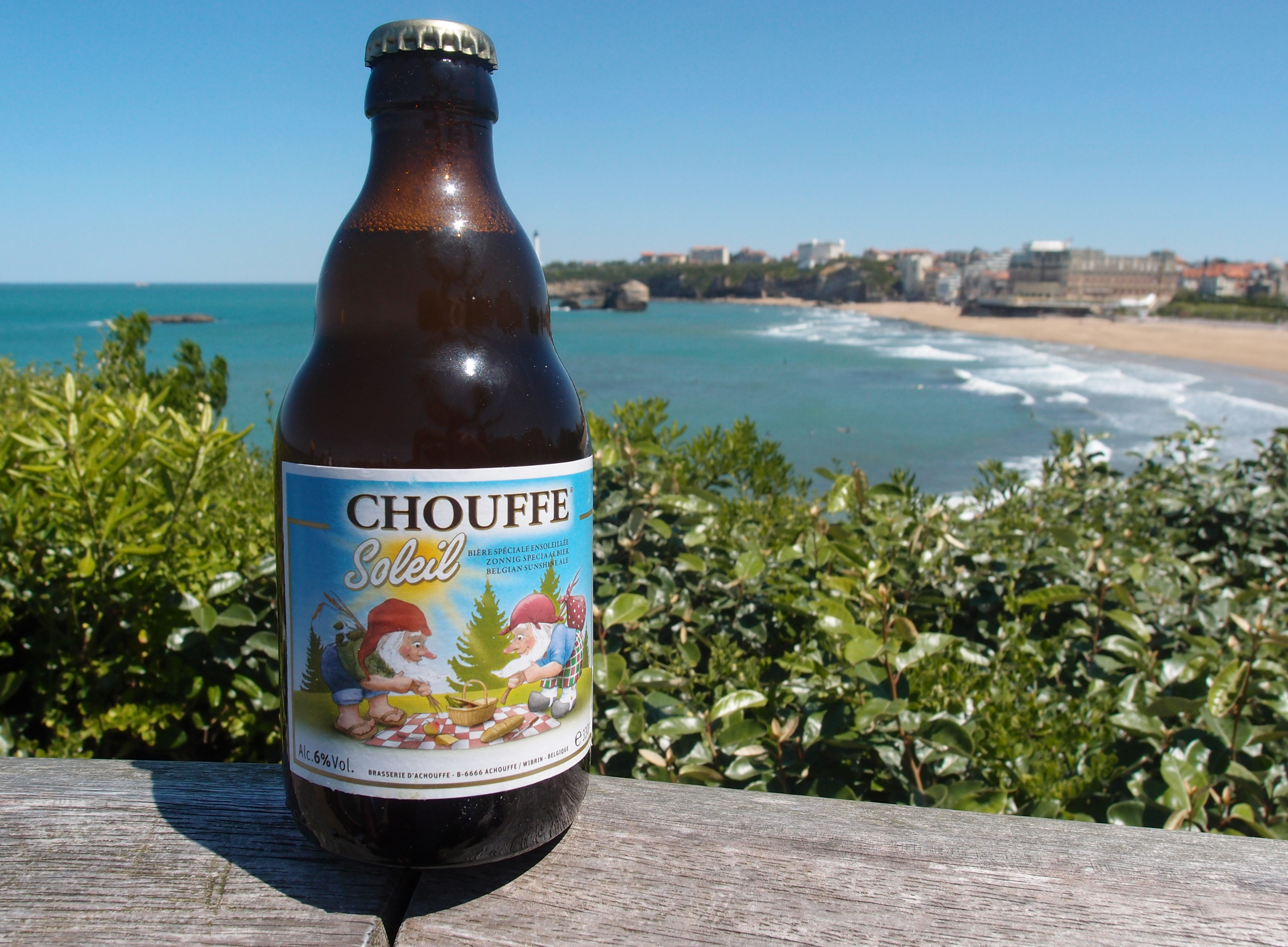
Chouffe Soleil

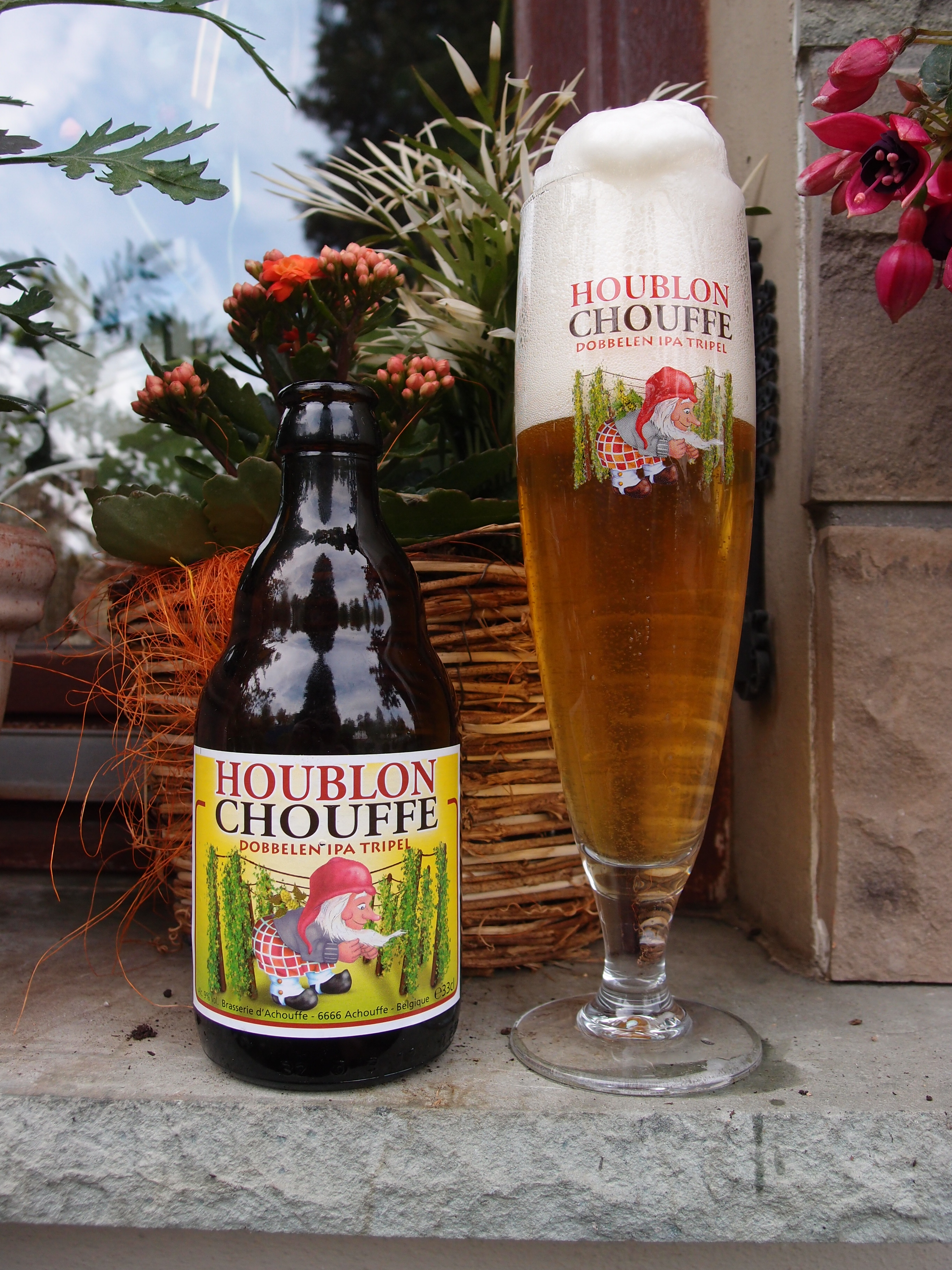
Houblon Chouffe

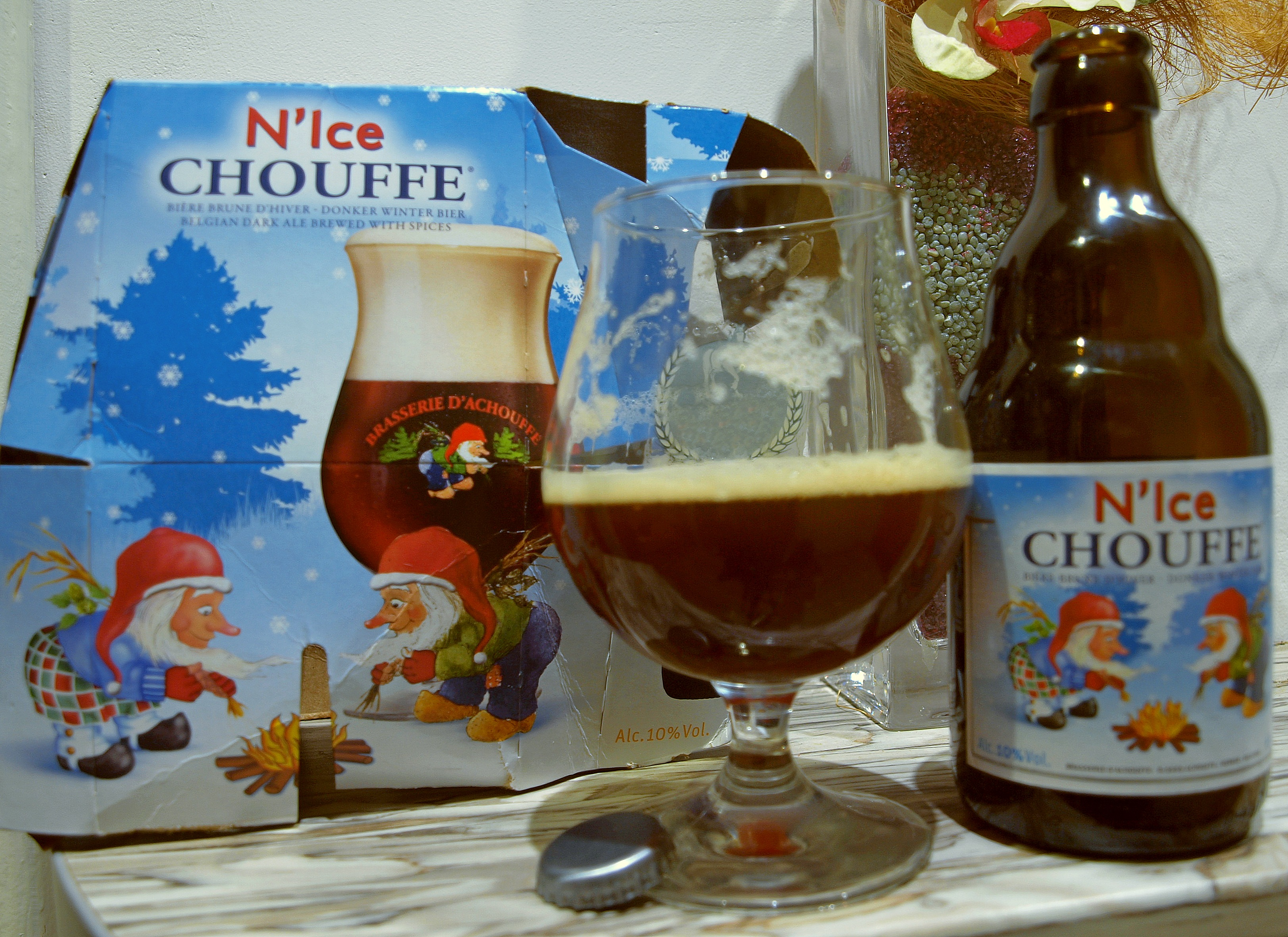
N'Ice Chouffe

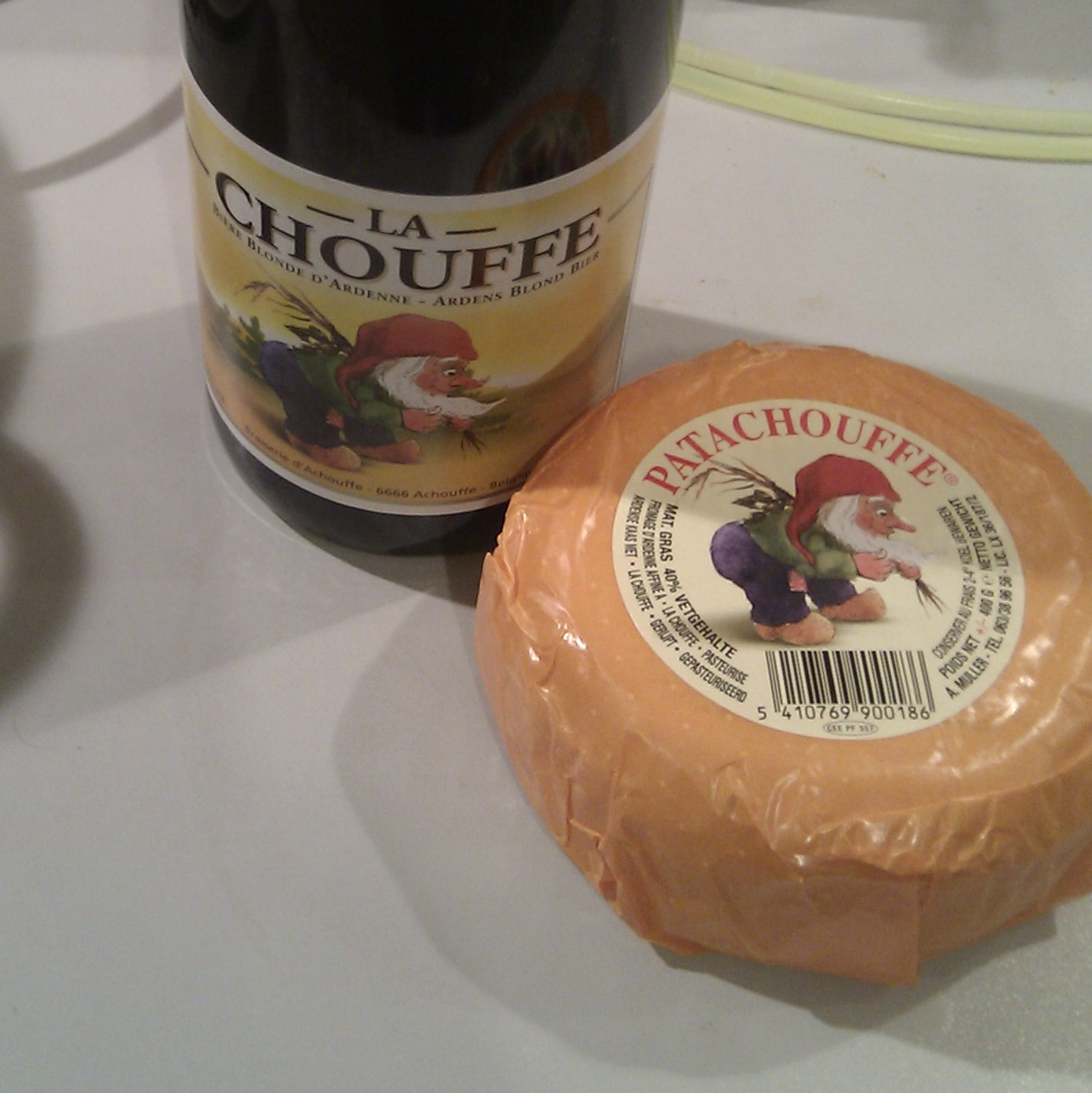
Patachouffe cheese
