= Baliza Hill =

Rocky hill in the South Shetland Islands, Antarctica

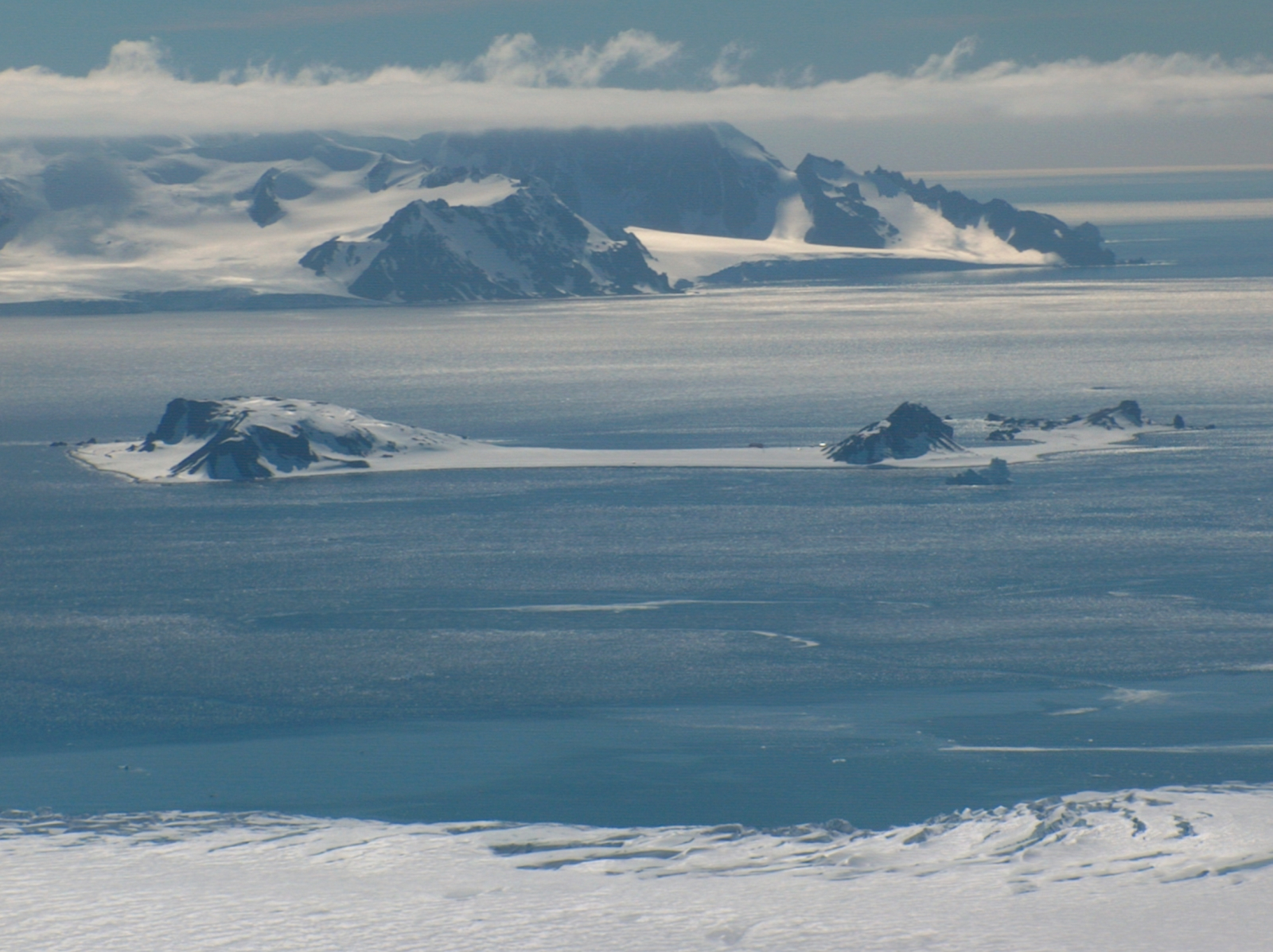
- Baliza Hill (in the right extremity of Half Moon Island) from Kuzman Knoll, Livingston Island, with Greenwich Island in the background

Highest point
- Peak: 40 metres (130 ft)

Geography
- Location within Antarctica
- Continent: Antarctica
- Island: Livingston Island, South Shetland Islands
- Range coordinates: 62°35′46″S 59°53′53.4″W

Baliza Hill is the conspicuous rocky hill rising to 40 metres (130 ft) in the southeast extremity of Half Moon Island in the South Shetland Islands, Antarctica and surmounting Menguante Cove to the north-northwest, McFarlane Strait to the northeast and east, and Mugla Passage to the south. The area was visited by early 19th century sealers operating from nearby Yankee Harbour.

The feature's name is descriptive (Spanish for ‘beacon’) and appeared in a 2000 publication following Argentine ornithological research on the island, and in the 2005 and 2009 Bulgarian maps of Livingston Island.

== Location ==
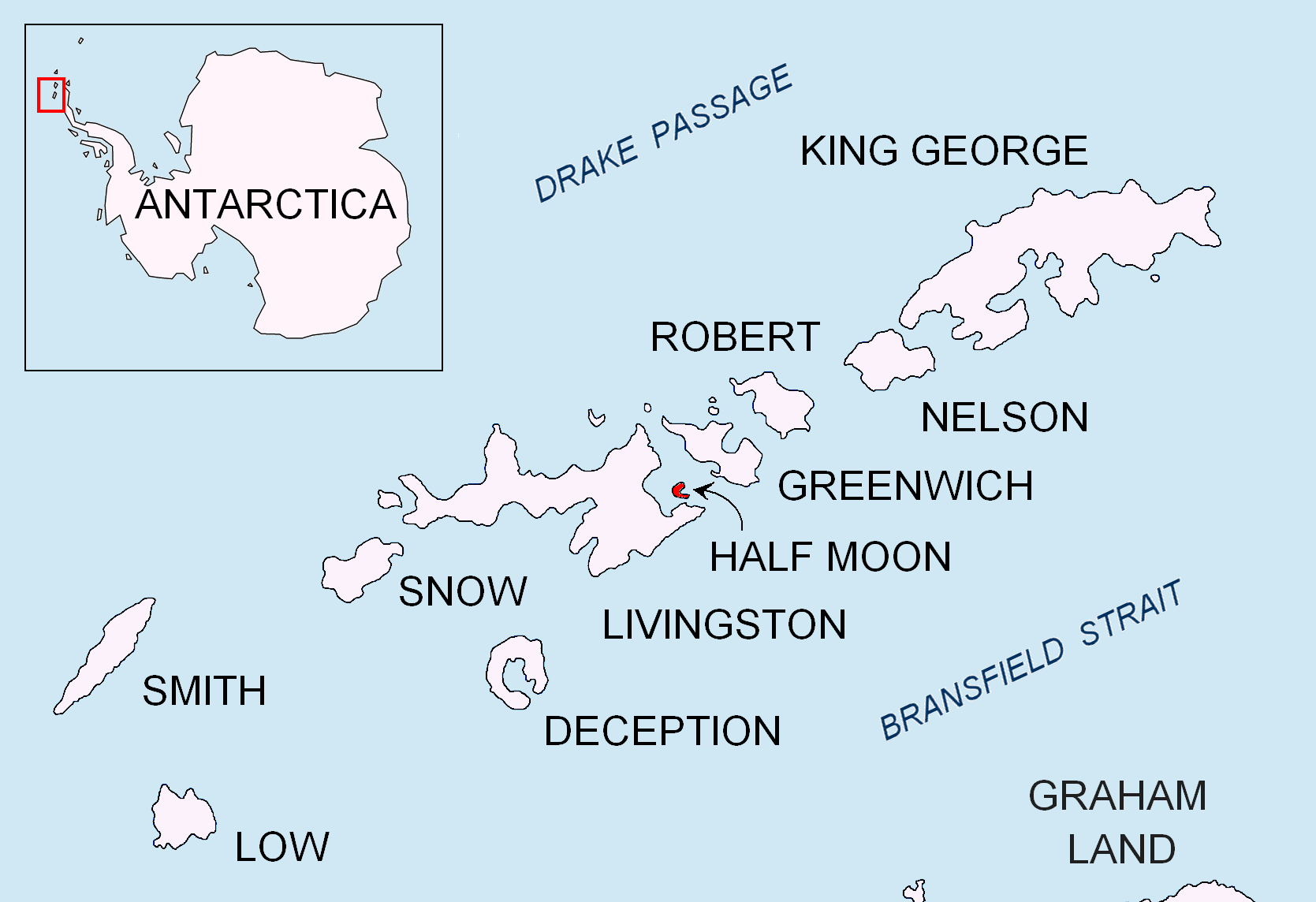
Location of Half Moon Island in the South Shetland Islands.

The hill is located at 62°35′46″S 59°53′53.4″W which is 1.2 kilometres (0.75 mi) east of La Morenita hill, 1.54 kilometres (0.96 mi) south-southeast of Xenia Hill, 10.11 kilometres (6.28 mi) west-southwest of Ephraim Bluff, Greenwich Island, 4.96 kilometres (3.08 mi) west-northwest of Renier Point, Livingston Island, 3.51 kilometres (2.18 mi) north-northwest of Kaloyan Nunatak, Livingston Island and 1.5 kilometres (0.93 mi) from the north coast of Burgas Peninsula, Livingston Island (Bulgarian mapping in 2005 and 2009).

== Maps ==
- L.L. Ivanov et al. Antarctica: Livingston Island and Greenwich Island, South Shetland Islands. Scale 1:100000 topographic map. Sofia: Antarctic Place-names Commission of Bulgaria, 2005.
- L.L. Ivanov. Antarctica: Livingston Island and Greenwich, Robert, Snow and Smith Islands. Scale 1:120000 topographic map. Troyan: Manfred Wörner Foundation, 2009. ISBN 978-954-92032-6-4
