= La Morenita (Antarctica) =

Rocky hill in the South Shetland Islands, Antarctica

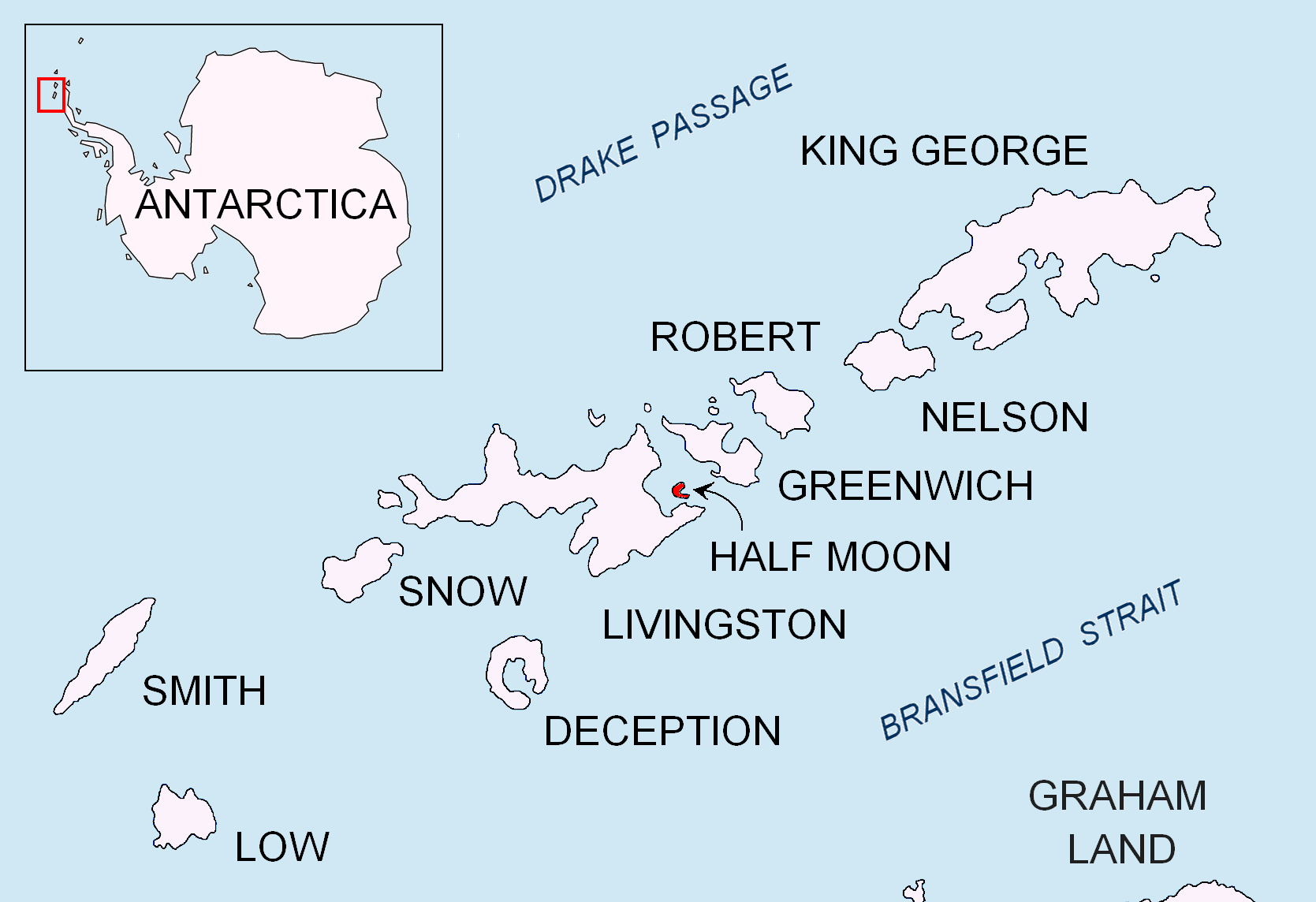
Location of Half Moon Island in the South Shetland Islands

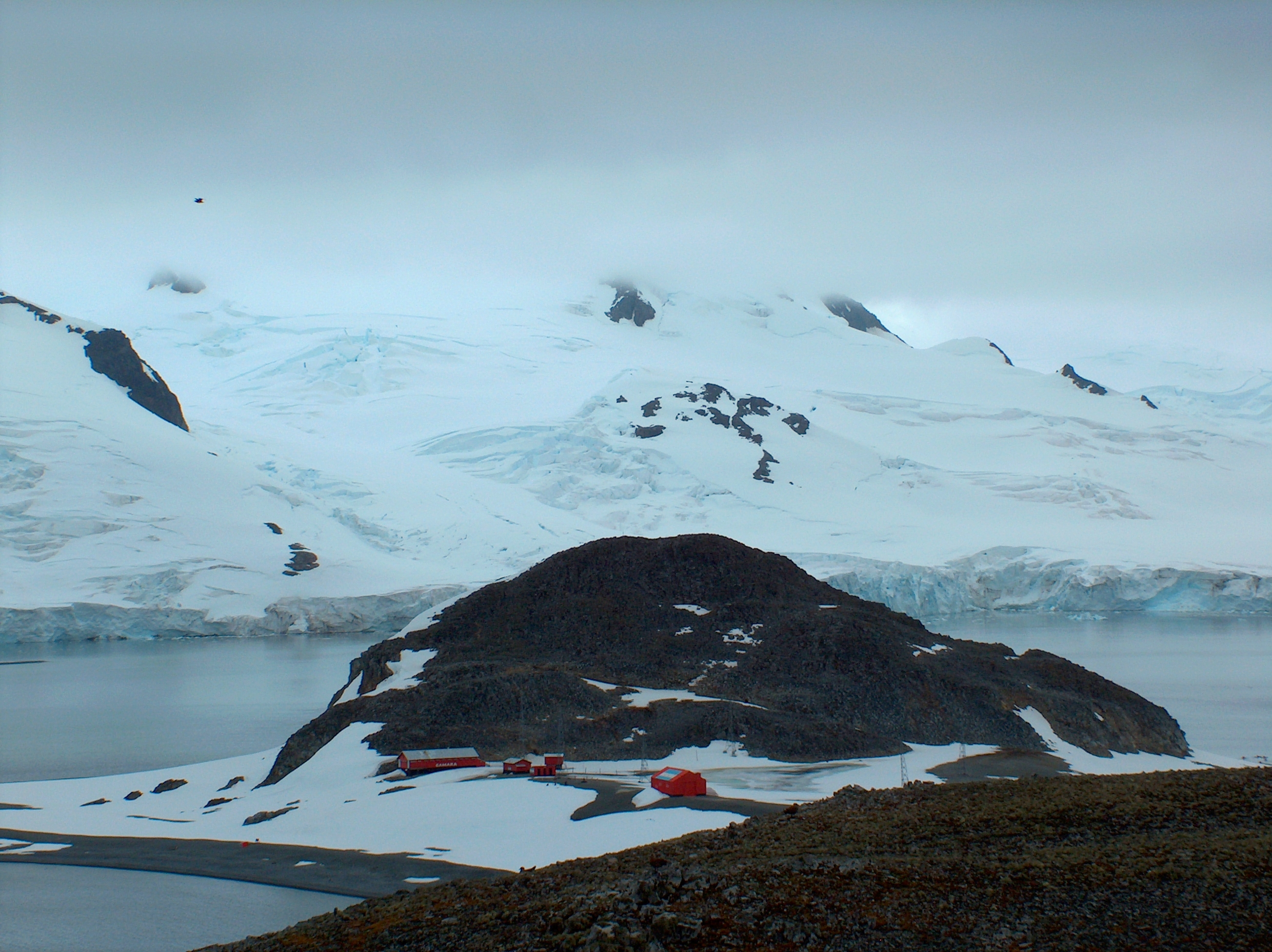
La Morenita from Xenia Hill, Half Moon Island, with Mugla Passage and Burgas Peninsula, Livingston Island in the background

Topographic map of Livingston Island and Smith Island

La Morenita is a conspicuous rocky hill rising to 93 m in the southwest extremity of Half Moon Island in the South Shetland Islands, Antarctica. It surmounts the Argentine Antarctic base Cámara situated in its northern foothills, Menguante Cove to the northeast and Mugla Passage to the south. The area was visited by early 19th century sealers operating from nearby Yankee Harbour.

The feature's name is descriptive. Spanish for "the brown one", the hill is named for the colour of the local volcanic rocks. It appeared in a 2000 publication following Argentine ornithological research on the island, and in the 2005 and 2009 Bulgarian maps of Livingston Island.

== Location ==
The hill located at 62°35′47″S 59°55′17″W which is 1.03 km south by east of Gabriel Hill, 1.2 km west of Baliza Hill, 6.11 km west-northwest of Renier Point, livingston Island, 4.05 km north by west of Elena Peak, Livingston Island, 1.67 km north of Ihtiman Hook, Livingston Island and 3.72 km northeast of Rila Point, Livingston Island (Bulgarian mapping in 2005 and 2009).

== Maps ==
- L.L. Ivanov et al. Antarctica: Livingston Island and Greenwich Island, South Shetland Islands. Scale 1:100000 topographic map. Sofia: Antarctic Place-names Commission of Bulgaria, 2005.
- L.L. Ivanov. Antarctica: Livingston Island and Greenwich, Robert, Snow and Smith Islands. Scale 1:120000 topographic map. Troyan: Manfred Wörner Foundation, 2009. ISBN 978-954-92032-6-4
- Antarctic Digital Database (ADD). Scale 1:250000 topographic map of Antarctica. Scientific Committee on Antarctic Research (SCAR). Since 1993, regularly updated.
- L.L. Ivanov. Antarctica: Livingston Island and Smith Island. Scale 1:100000 topographic map. Manfred Wörner Foundation, 2017. ISBN 978-619-90008-3-0
