= Gabriel Hill =

Summit in Antarctica

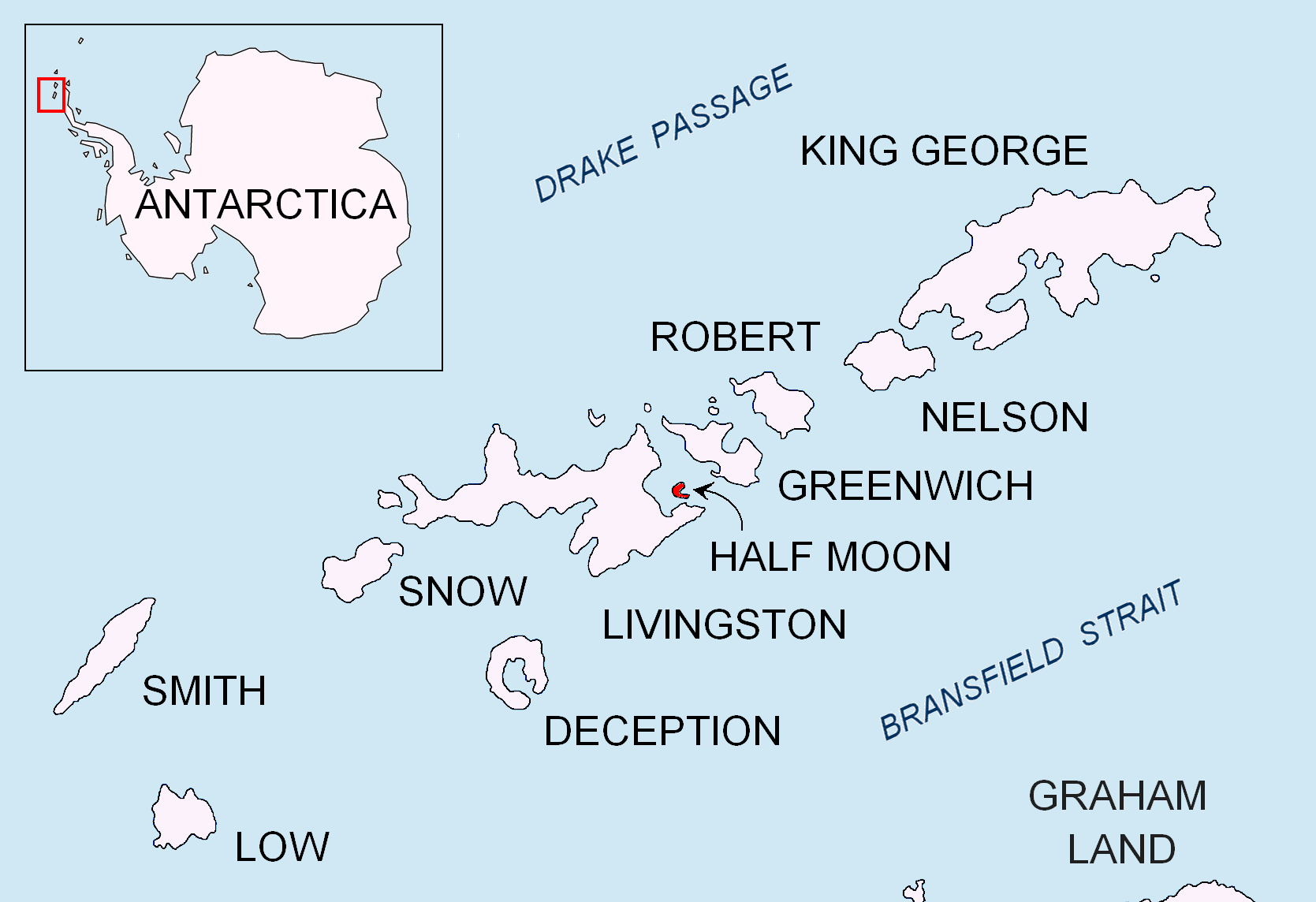
Location of Half Moon Island in the South Shetland Islands

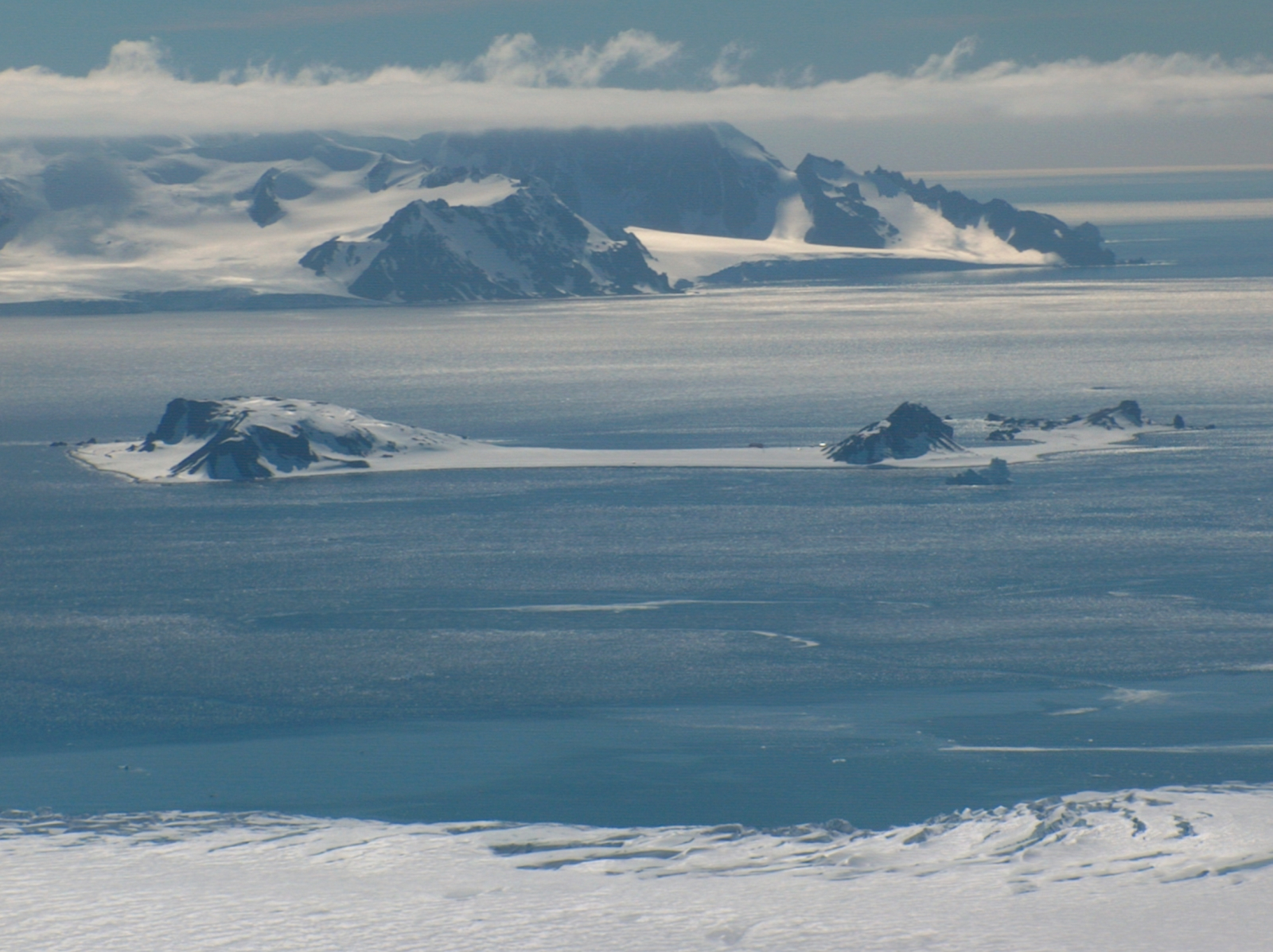
Gabriel Hill (the nearer hill on the left side of Half Moon Island) from Kuzman Knoll, Livingston Island, with Greenwich Island in the background

Topographic map of Livingston Island and Smith Island

Gabriel Hill is the summit of Half Moon Island in the South Shetland Islands, Antarctica. It is a rocky hill rising to 101 m in the island's northwest extremity and surmounting Moon Bay to the west and Menguante Cove to the southeast. The area was visited by early 19th century sealers operating from nearby Yankee Harbour.

The feature's name appeared in a 2000 publication following Argentine ornithological research on the island, and in the 2005 and 2009 Bulgarian maps of Livingston Island.

== Location ==
The hill located at 62°35′15″S 59°55′38″W which is 690 m southwest of Xenia Hill, 1.03 km north by west of La Morenita Hill, 10.43 km east by north of Sliven Peak, Livingston Island, 8.1 km east by south of Sindel Point, Livingston Island and 6.81 km southeast of Edinburgh Hill, Livingston Island (Bulgarian mapping in 2005 and 2009).

== Maps ==
- L.L. Ivanov et al. Antarctica: Livingston Island and Greenwich Island, South Shetland Islands. Scale 1:100000 topographic map. Sofia: Antarctic Place-names Commission of Bulgaria, 2005.
- L.L. Ivanov. Antarctica: Livingston Island and Greenwich, Robert, Snow and Smith Islands. Scale 1:120000 topographic map. Troyan: Manfred Wörner Foundation, 2009. ISBN 978-954-92032-6-4
- Antarctic Digital Database (ADD). Scale 1:250000 topographic map of Antarctica. Scientific Committee on Antarctic Research (SCAR). Since 1993, regularly updated.
- L.L. Ivanov. Antarctica: Livingston Island and Smith Island. Scale 1:100000 topographic map. Manfred Wörner Foundation, 2017. ISBN 978-619-90008-3-0
