= Cámara Base =

Cámara Base Base Cámara Estación Cámara
- Antarctic base
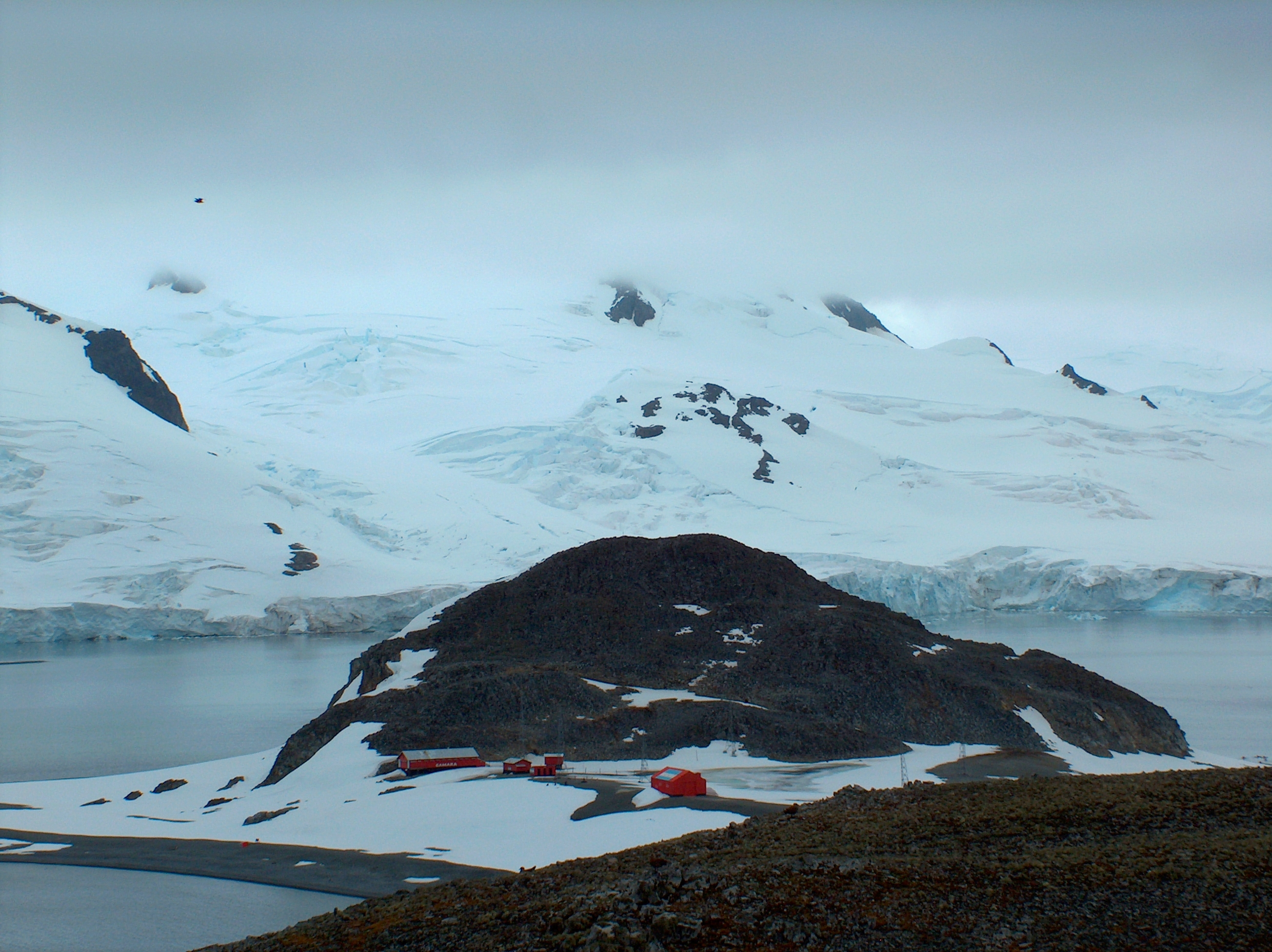
- Cámara Base overview

- Location within Antarctica
- Coordinates: 62°35′41″S 59°55′07″W
- Country: Argentina
- Province: Tierra del Fuego, Antarctica, and South Atlantic Islands Province
- Department: Antártida Argentina
- Region: South Shetland Islands
- Location: Menguante Cove; Half Moon Island
- Founded: April 1, 1953 (1952–53 austral summer season)
- Named after: Juan Ramón Cámara

Government
  - Type: Directorate
  - Body: Dirección Nacional del Antártico
  - Operator: Instituto Antártico Argentino
- Elevation: 22 m (72 ft)

Population (2017)
  - Summer: 20
  - Winter: 0
- Time zone: UTC-3 (ART)
- Type: Seasonal
- Period: Summer
- Status: Operational
- Facilities: List: Main house; Emergency house; Infirmary; Laboratory; Freezing chamber; Warehouse and deposit
- Cámara Lighthouse
- Construction: fiber glass tower
- Height: 9 m (30 ft), 12 m (39 ft)
- Shape: cylindrical tower with balcony and light
- Markings: black tower with yellow horizontal bands
- Power source: solar power
- Focal height: 18 m (59 ft)
- Range: 6 nmi (11 km; 6.9 mi)
- Characteristic: Fl W 10s

Topographic map of Livingston Island with the bases and base camps on the island.

Cámara Base (Spanish: Base Cámara or sometimes Estación Cámara or Teniente Camara) is an Argentine Antarctic base and scientific research station named after Frigate Lieutenant Naval Aviator Juan Ramón Cámara. It is located in the northern foothills of La Morenita Hill, at Menguante Cove in Half Moon Island off the east coast of Livingston Island in the South Shetland Islands, Antarctica.

As of 2014 Cámara is one of 13 research bases in Antarctica operated by Argentina. It was officially opened on April 1, 1953, and was in service until the summer of 1959–60, when it was closed. It was not reopened until 1988, to serve during the summer season only.

== History ==
During the austral summer campaign of 1952–1953 one of the main missions of the Argentine Antarctic Task Force, then commanded by then Ship-of-the-Line Captain Rodolfo N. Panzarini, was to establish a new naval detachment in the South Shetland Islands.

The selected place was the small Half Moon Island next to Livingston Island, where it was inaugurated as Destacamento Naval Luna ("Luna Naval Detachment") on 1 April 1953 by the governor of Tierra del Fuego National Territory, Rear Admiral Carlos Suárez Dóriga.

Later it was renamed as Destacamento Naval Teniente de Fragata Cámara ("Frigate Lieutenant Cámara Naval Detachment"), in memory of the naval aviator Juan Ramón Cámara, who on 16 January 1955 perished in an on-duty accident on Potter Cove, King George Island.

Cámara Base was closed after the austral summer season of 1959–60 and was reopened in December 1988, thereafter limited to summer-only campaigns.

== Description ==
Cámara is located 1,173 km (729 mi) from Ushuaia, the nearest port city.

As of 2014 it is composed of 4 buildings. Facilities at the base include the main and emergency houses, a freezing chamber, a warehouse and a deposit. It also has a 16 m^{2} (170 sq ft) infirmary attended by a paramedic.

=== Scientific activities ===
Besides the permanent surface meteorological observations carried out at Cámara by the Argentine National Meteorological Service personnel, other research divisions also do extensive work at the base: in 1987–94 experts brought in by the Argentine Antarctic Institute studied physical oceanography and geochronology; between 1992 and 1996 Biology worked on birds, while Environmental Management analyzed the impact of local tourism.

== Climate ==
The average annual temperature is −2.9 °C (26.8 °F). On 12 August 1954 it was recorded an absolute minimum of −30 °C (−22 °F).

== See also ==
- List of lighthouses in Antarctica
- List of Antarctic research stations
- List of Antarctic field camps
- Argentine Antarctica
