= Emm Rock =

Antarctic island

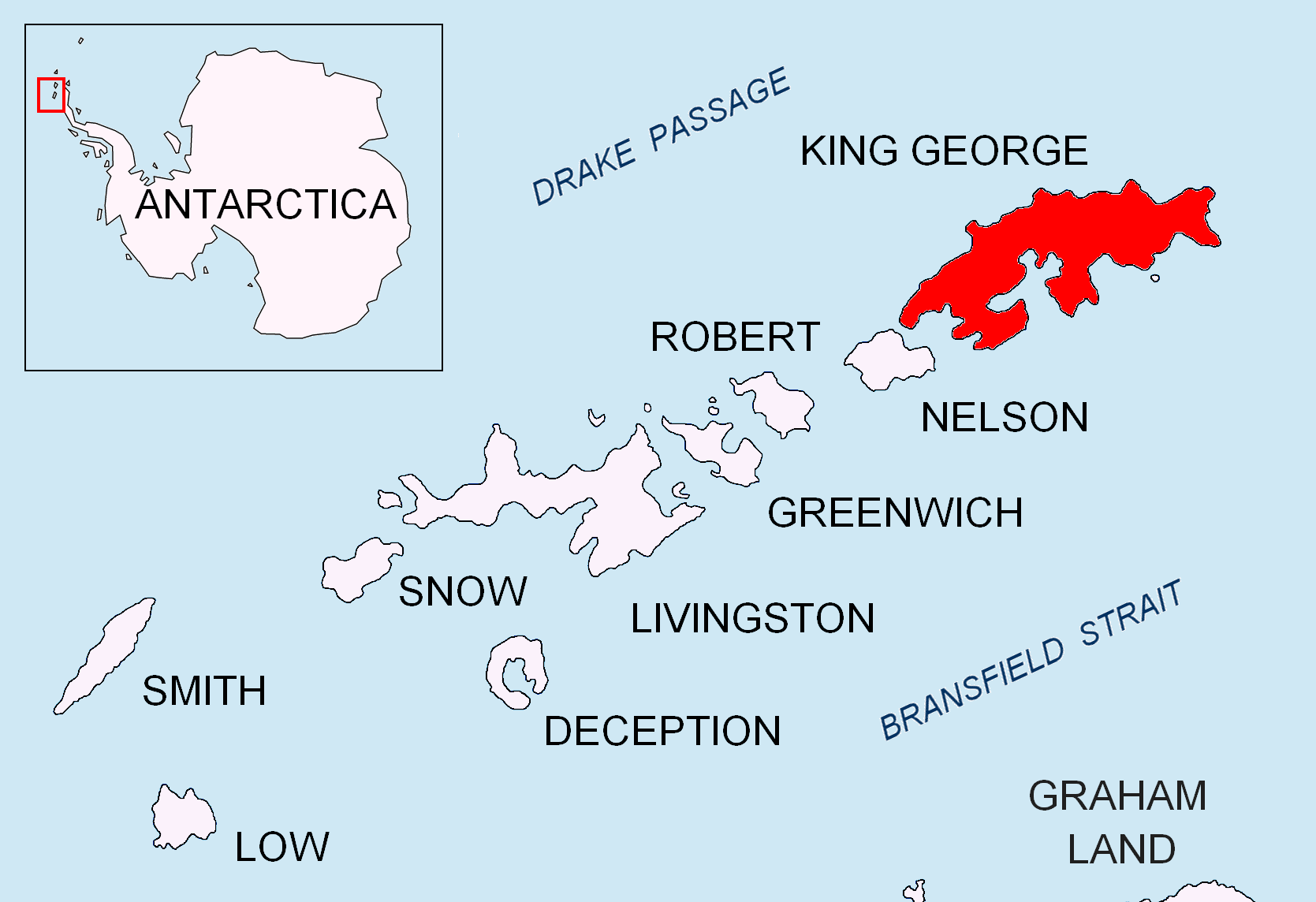
Location of King George Island in the South Shetland Islands.

Emm Rock (62°15′38″S 58°41′22″W) is a conspicuous rock 30 metres (100 ft) high, lying 0.5 nautical miles (1 km) off the south coast of King George Island at the east side of the entrance to Potter Cove, in the South Shetland Islands. This rock, presumably known to early sealers in the area, was sketched by the French Antarctic Expedition, 1908–10, under Jean-Baptiste Charcot, and charted by Discovery Investigations personnel on the Discovery II in 1935. The name derives from the shape of the rock, which resembles the letter M.
