= Rugged Rocks =

Group of rocks in the South Shetland Islands

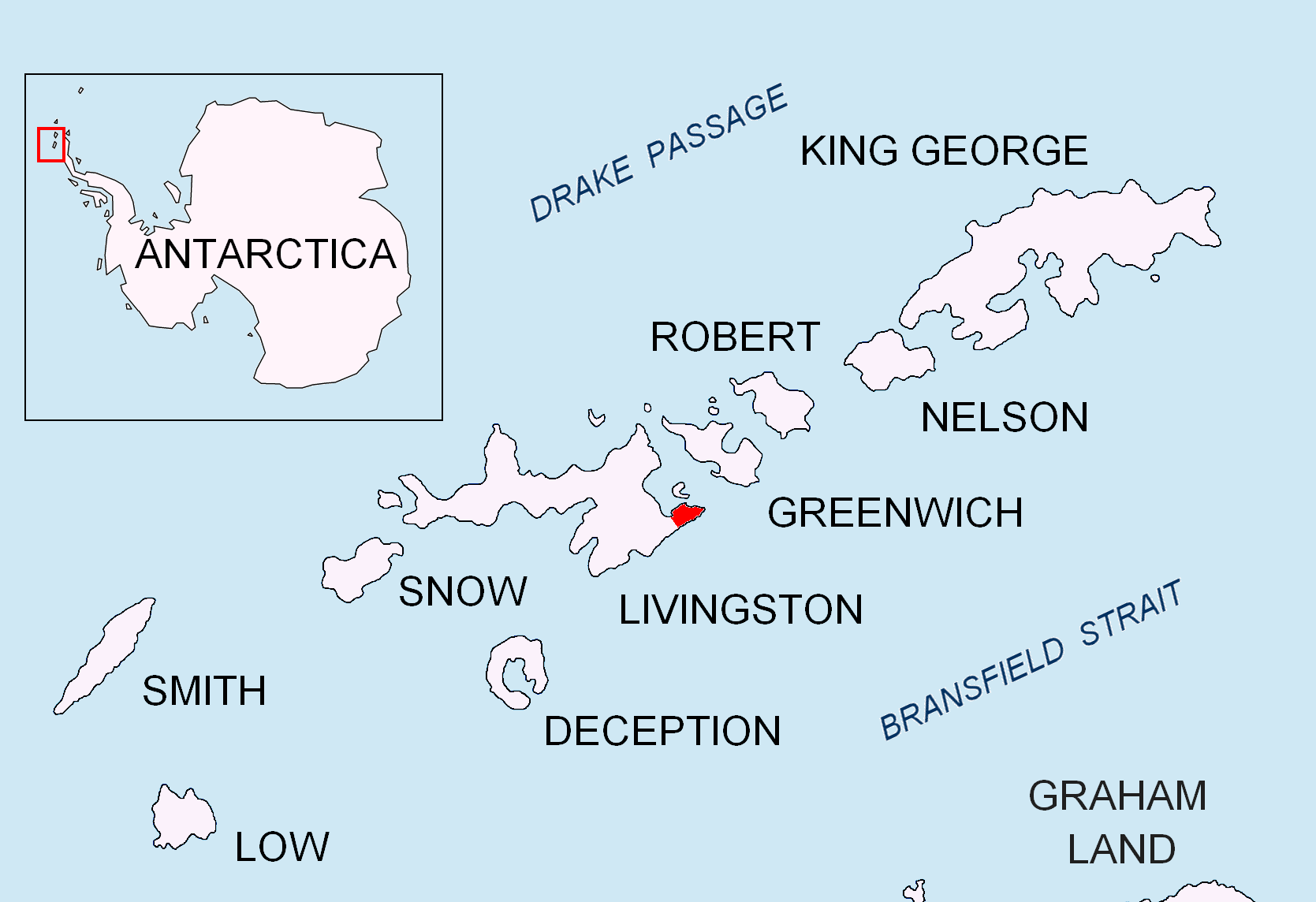
Location of Burgas Peninsula, Livingston Island in the South Shetland Islands.

Topographic map of Livingston Island, Greenwich, Robert, Snow and Smith Islands.

Rugged Rocks (62°37′S 59°48′W) is a small group of rocks at the west side of the south entrance to McFarlane Strait, lying just north of Renier Point, Burgas Peninsula on Livingston Island, in the South Shetland Islands. These rocks were known to early sealers in the area and appear on Powell's map of 1822. They were recharted in 1935 by DI personnel on the Discovery II and given this descriptive name.
