= Jasper Point =

Jasper Point (62°11′23″S 58°54′21″W) is the northeastern entrance point to Norma Cove, Fildes Peninsula, on King George Island in the South Shetland Islands. The point is bounded by cliffs of black and buff rocks, in which occur veins of red and green jasper. It was so named by the UK Antarctic Place-Names Committee following geological work by the British Antarctic Survey in 1975–76.
