= Suffield Point =

Suffield Point lighthouse
- Location: King George Island, Suffield Point, Antarctica
- Coordinates: 62°11′19″S 58°54′24″W

Tower
- Foundation: concrete base
- Construction: aluminium skeletal tower
- Height: 5 m (16 ft)
- Shape: square truncated tower
- Markings: white tower and red band
- Power source: solar power

Light
- Focal height: 52 m (171 ft)
- Range: 6 nmi (11 km; 6.9 mi)
- Characteristic: Fl W 5s

Suffield Point is the south-west entrance point of Norma Cove, Fildes Peninsula, on King George Island in the South Shetland Islands of Antarctica. It was charted in the course of the Discovery Investigations, 1933–35, and named after boatswain William E. Suffield. The site is part of the Fildes Peninsula Antarctic Specially Protected Area (ASPA 125), designated as such because of its paleontological values.

== See also ==
- List of lighthouses in Antarctica
