= Py Point =

Headland

Py Point Lighthouse
- Location: Doumer Island, Palmer Archipelago, Antarctica
- Coordinates: 64°52′33″S 63°35′02″W

Tower
- Foundation: concrete base
- Construction: metal skeletal tower
- Height: 11 m (36 ft)
- Shape: square pyramidal tower
- Markings: Red
- Power source: solar power
- Operator: Instituto Antártico Chileno

Light
- Focal height: 71 m (233 ft)
- Range: 5 nmi (9.3 km; 5.8 mi)
- Characteristic: Fl W 5s

Py Point (64°53′S 63°37′W) is a point forming the south extremity of Doumer Island, in the Palmer Archipelago. Discovered by the French Antarctic Expedition, 1903–05, and named by Charcot for Monsieur Py, president of the French Chamber of Commerce in Buenos Aires at that time.

== See also ==
- List of lighthouses in Antarctica
