= List of lighthouses in Antarctica =

This is a list of lighthouses in Antarctica.

== Lighthouses ==
Name	Image	Year built	Location & coordinates	Light characteristic	Focal height	NGA number	Admiralty number	Range nml
Ardley Cove Lighthouse		n/a	Eduardo Frei Montalva Station; 62°12′02.8″S 58°57′36.6″W	Fl W 5s.	5 metres (16 ft)	2721	G1387.9	6
Ardley Island Lighthouse		n/a	Ardley Island; 62°12′38.0″S 58°55′34.4″W	Fl W 10s.	45 metres (148 ft)	2720	G1388	6
Bell Island Lighthouse		n/a	Gerlache Strait; 64°16′30″S 61°58′56″W	Fl W 5s.	56 metres (184 ft)	2768	G1395	6
Buenos Aires Lighthouse		n/a	Prevot Island; 64°53′18″S 63°56′48″W	Fl W 10s.	37 metres (121 ft)	2792	G1400	5
Cámara Lighthouse		n/a	Cámara Station; 62°14′24.1″S 58°40′43.5″W	Fl W 10s.	18 metres (59 ft)	2724	G1387.6	6
Cape Lloyd Lighthouse		n/a	Cape Lloyd; ~61°07′52″S 54°00′34″W	Fl W 10s.	113 metres (371 ft)	2720.5	G1388.2	5
Cape Renard Lighthouse		n/a	Cape Renard; 65°01′11″S 63°46′14″W	F W 10s.	7 metres (23 ft)	2793	G1401	5
Collins Point Lighthouse		n/a	Collins Point; 62°59′45″S 60°35′11″W	Fl W 5s.	10 metres (33 ft)	2745	G1382	6
Destacamento Lighthouse		n/a	Orcades Station; 60°44′11.9″S 44°44′19.7″W (NGA)	Fl W 3s.	n/a	20363.2	G1378.5	n/a
Edwards Point Lighthouse		n/a	Robert Island; 62°27′39.2″S 59°30′48.1″W	Fl W 10s.	25 metres (82 ft)	2732	G1386	7
Fort William Lighthouse		n/a	Fort William; 62°22′13″S 59°43′23″W	Fl W 5s.	10 metres (33 ft)	2736	G1384	5
Grumete Lighthouse		n/a	Deception Island; 62°58′47″S 60°39′40″W	Fl W 8s.	104 metres (341 ft)	2744	G1381	5
Grunden Rock Lighthouse	Image	n/a	Esperenza Station; 63°23′42.5″S 56°58′32.4″W	Fl W 2s.	26 metres (85 ft)	2756	G1389	6
Martel Inlet Lighthouse		2007	Martel Inlet; 62°05′01.8″S 58°23′31.5″W	Iso R 2s.	14 metres (46 ft)	2729	G1387.5	10
Pedro Vincente Maldonado Range Front Lighthouse		n/a	Maldonado Station; 62°26′44″S 59°44′17″W	Fl W 4s.	9 metres (30 ft)	2733	G1383.5	6
Point Thomas Lighthouse		n/a	Arctowski Station; 62°09′28.4″S 58°27′55.9″W	L Fl W 9s.	18 metres (59 ft)	2728	G1387.4	8
Potter Cove Lighthouse		n/a	Potter Cove; 62°14′03.0″S 58°39′17.5″W	Fl W 7s.	10 metres (33 ft)	2725	G1387.7	n/a
Primero de Mayo Lighthouse		1942	Melchior Station; 64°18′57.1″S 62°56′19.3″W	Fl W 8s.	27 metres (89 ft)	---	ARLHS; ANC-001	n/a
Py Point Lighthouse		n/a	Py Point; 64°52′44″S 63°35′32″W	Fl W 5s.	71 metres (233 ft)	2788	G1399.4	5
Signy Island Lighthouse		n/a	Signy Island; 60°42′24.3″S 45°35′33.2″W	F W	24 metres (79 ft)	20362	G1375	n/a
Suffield Point Lighthouse		n/a	Suffield Point; 62°11′18.7″S 58°54′24.4″W	Fl W 5s.	52 metres (171 ft)	2722	G1387.8	6
Surgidero Iquique Lighthouse		n/a	Deception Island; 62°58′09″S 60°42′33″W	Fl W 5s.	114 metres (374 ft)	2743	G1383	5

== See also ==
- Lists of lighthouses and lightvessels
