= Saddleback Ridge =

Ridge in the South Shetland Islands

Saddleback Ridge (62°35′07.7″S 59°55′07.3″W) is a ridge rising to 125 m in the north part of Half Moon Island, Moon Bay, Livingston Island. A descriptive name applied following geological work by British Antarctic Survey (BAS), 1975–76. The "saddle" refers to a cover of permanent ice on the lower, central part of this 0.75 mile long ridge.
