= Prevot Island =

Island in Antarctica

Buenos Aires Lighthouse
- Location: Prevot Island, Wilhelm Archipelago, Antarctica
- Coordinates: 64°53′18″S 63°56′48″W

Tower
- Foundation: concrete base
- Construction: metal skeletal tower
- Height: 6 m (20 ft)
- Shape: square pyramidal skeletal tower
- Power source: solar power

Light
- Focal height: 37 m (121 ft)
- Range: 5 nmi (9.3 km; 5.8 mi)
- Characteristic: Fl W 10s

Prevot Island (64°53′S 63°58′W) is a small rocky island 0.5 nautical miles (0.9 km) northeast of Miller Island, forming the northernmost of the Wauwermans Islands, in the Wilhelm Archipelago. The name was approved by the Argentine geographic coordinating committee in 1956, replacing the provisional toponym "Fernando." Named in memory of First Lieutenant Prevot, commander of the mobile detachment in the operations of the Argentine Air Force unit for Antarctica. He died on active duty.

== See also ==
- List of lighthouses in Antarctica
- List of Antarctic and sub-Antarctic islands
