= Xenia Hill =

Rocky hill in the South Shetland Islands, Antarctica

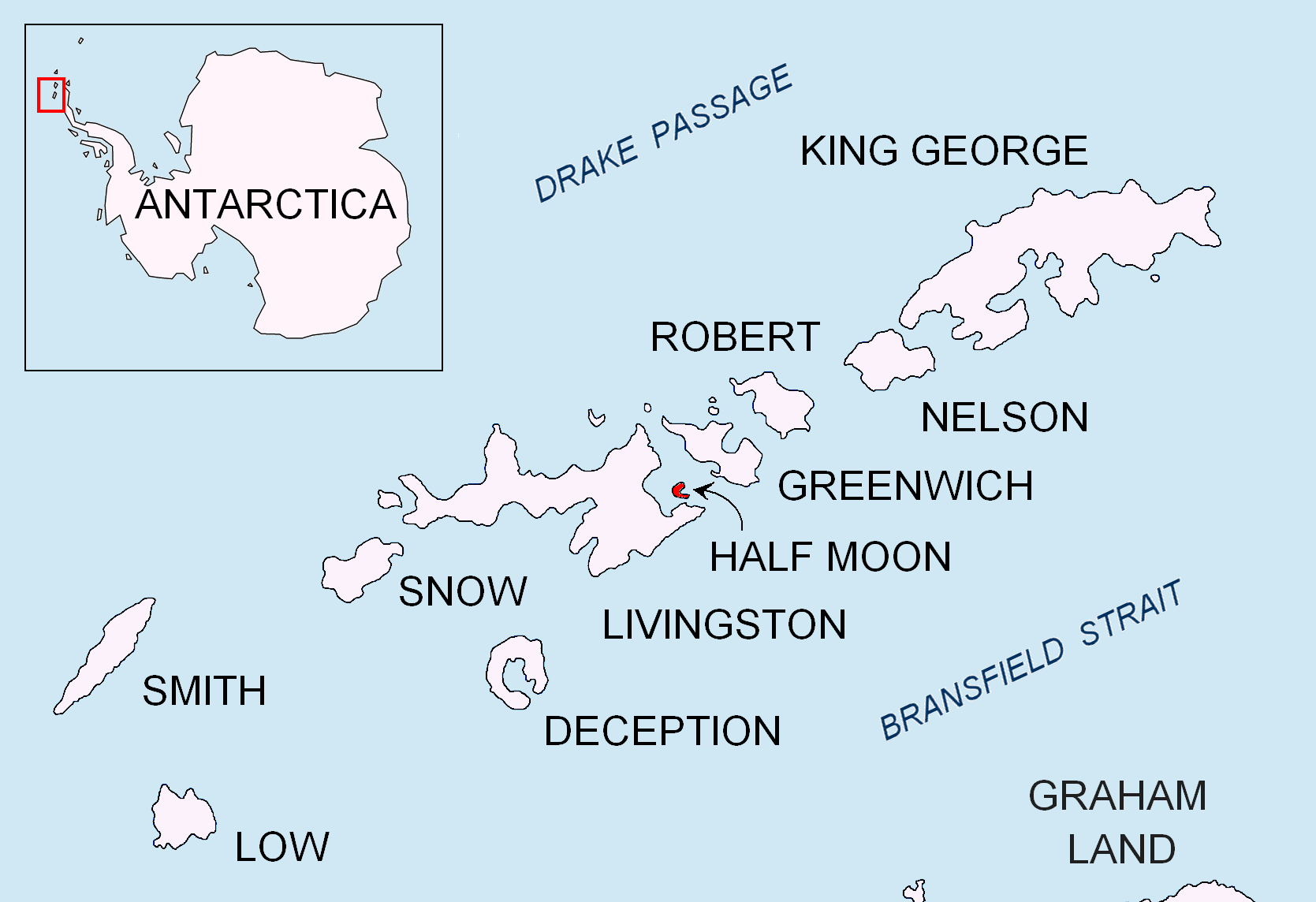
Location of Half Moon Island in the South Shetland Islands

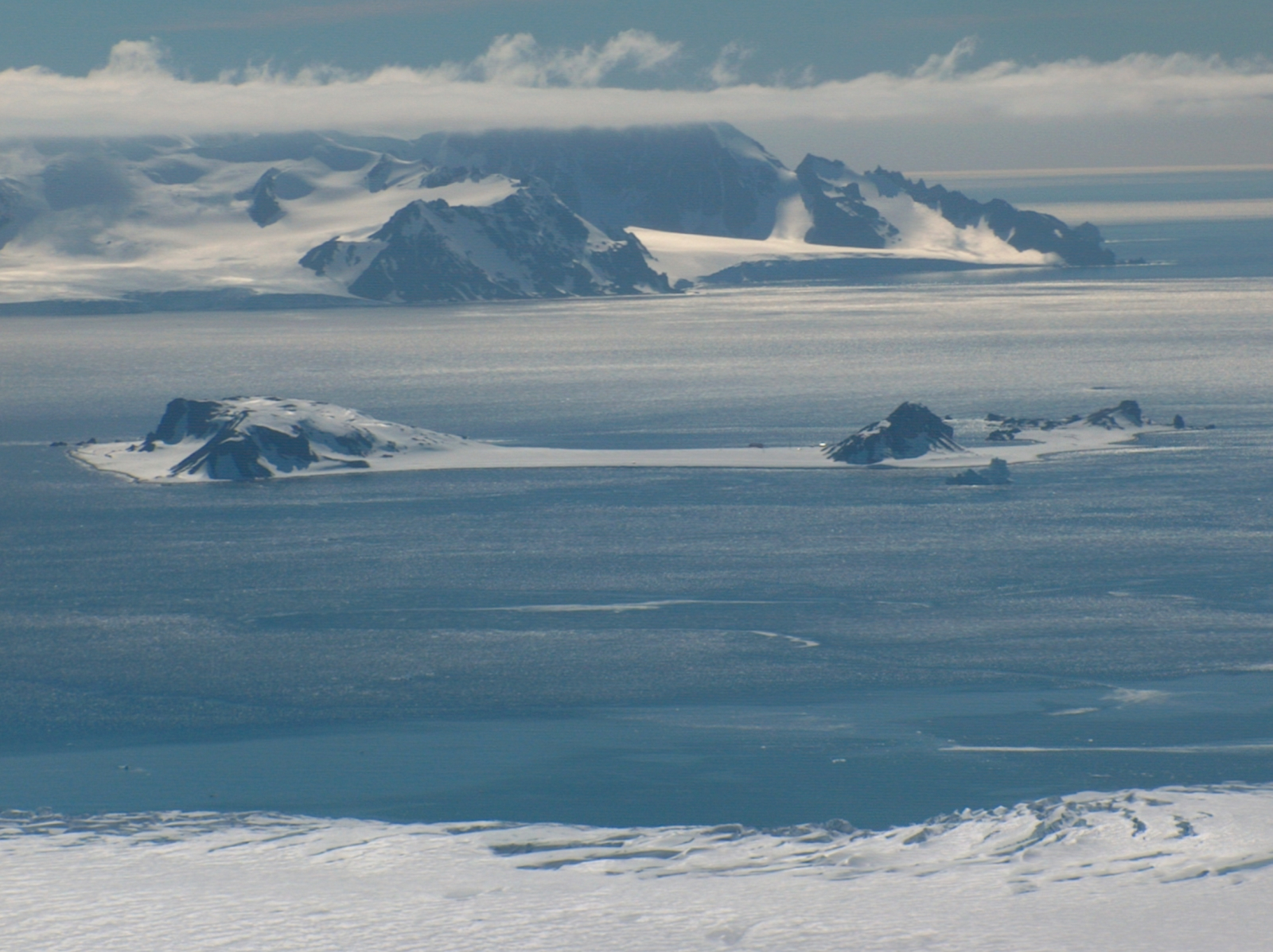
Xenia Hill (the farther hill on the left side of Half Moon Island) from Kuzman Knoll, Livingston Island, with Greenwich Island in the background

Topographic map of Livingston Island and Smith Island

Xenia Hill is the rocky hill rising to 96 m in the northeast extremity of Half Moon Island in the South Shetland Islands, Antarctica. It surmounts McFarlane Strait to the north and east, and Menguante Cove to the south-southeast. The area was visited by early 19th century sealers operating from nearby Yankee Harbour.

The feature's name appeared in a 2000 publication following Argentine ornithological research on the island, and in the 2005 and 2009 Bulgarian maps of Livingston Island.

== Location ==
The hill located at 62°35′05.1″S 59°54′54.8″W which is 690 m northeast of Gabriel Hill, 7.03 km southeast of Edinburgh Hill, Livingston Island, 7.88 km south-southwest of Triangle Point, Greenwich Island and 10.46 km west-southwest of Ephraim Bluff, Greenwich Island (Bulgarian mapping in 2005 and 2009).

== Maps ==
- L.L. Ivanov et al. Antarctica: Livingston Island and Greenwich Island, South Shetland Islands. Scale 1:100000 topographic map. Sofia: Antarctic Place-names Commission of Bulgaria, 2005.
- L.L. Ivanov. Antarctica: Livingston Island and Greenwich, Robert, Snow and Smith Islands. Scale 1:120000 topographic map. Troyan: Manfred Wörner Foundation, 2009. ISBN 978-954-92032-6-4
- Antarctic Digital Database (ADD). Scale 1:250000 topographic map of Antarctica. Scientific Committee on Antarctic Research (SCAR). Since 1993, regularly updated.
- L.L. Ivanov. Antarctica: Livingston Island and Smith Island. Scale 1:100000 topographic map. Manfred Wörner Foundation, 2017. ISBN 978-619-90008-3-0
