= Three Brothers Hill =

Geographical feature in Antarctica

Three Brothers Hill (62°14′35″S 58°40′28″W) is a conspicuous hill, 210 m, which is the remnant neck of an extinct volcano situated at the east side of Potter Cove, King George Island, in the South Shetland Islands. The name was used by Scottish geologist David Ferguson in a 1921 report based upon his investigations of King George Island in 1913–14, but may reflect an earlier naming by whalers. The name may be suggestive of the appearance of the feature which consists of two higher summits and one which is lower.
