= Norma Cove =

Norma Cove (62°11′23″S 58°54′47″W) is a cove between Suffield Point and Jasper Point, Maxwell Bay, King George Island. The feature was named "Bukhta Norma" or "Norma Inlet" by L.S. Govorukha and I.M. Simonov, 1973, following Soviet Antarctic Expedition surveys from the nearby Bellingshausen Station.
