= Mugla Passage =

Strait in the archipelago of the South Shetland Islands

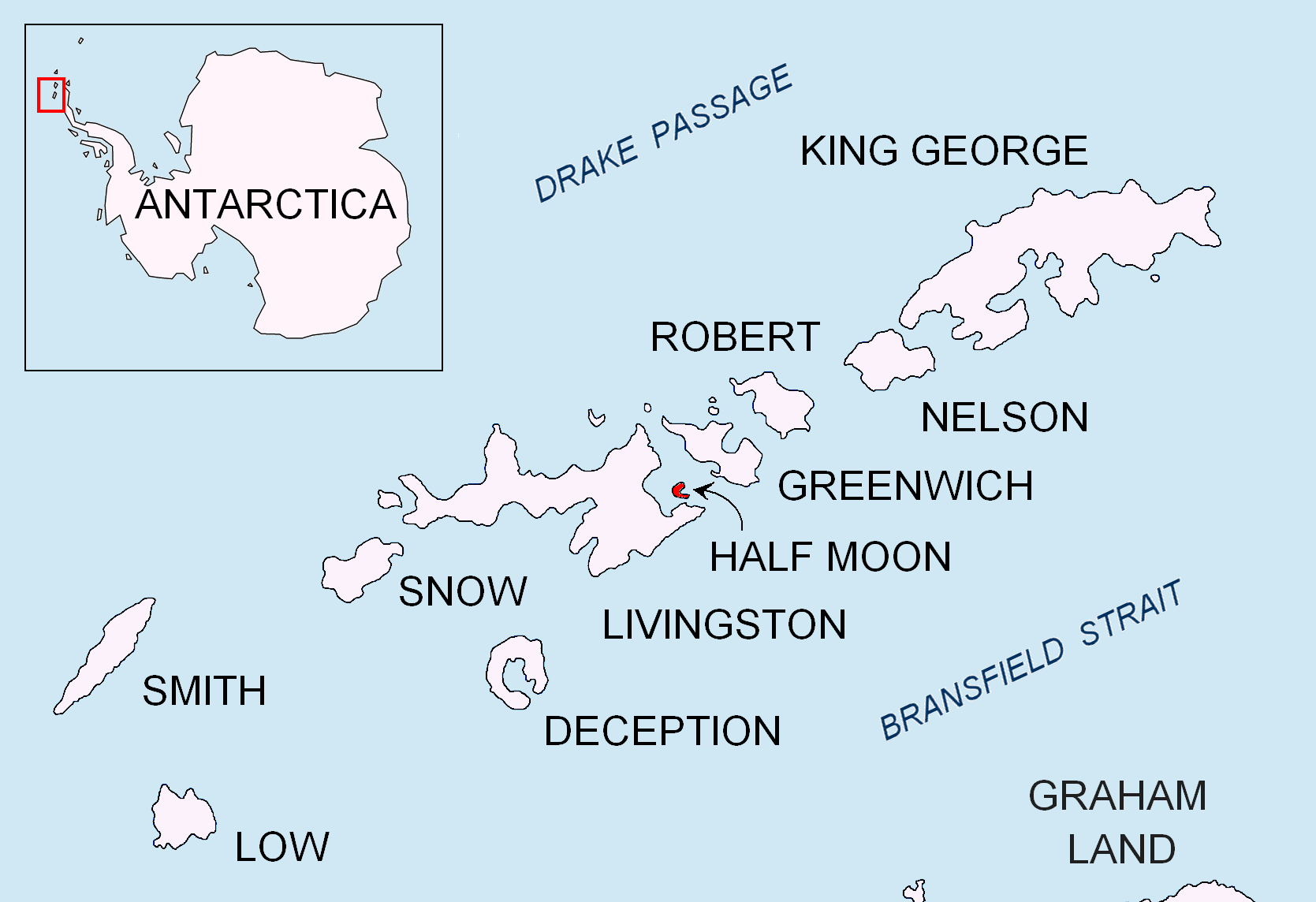
Location of Half Moon Island and Livingston Island in the South Shetland Islands.

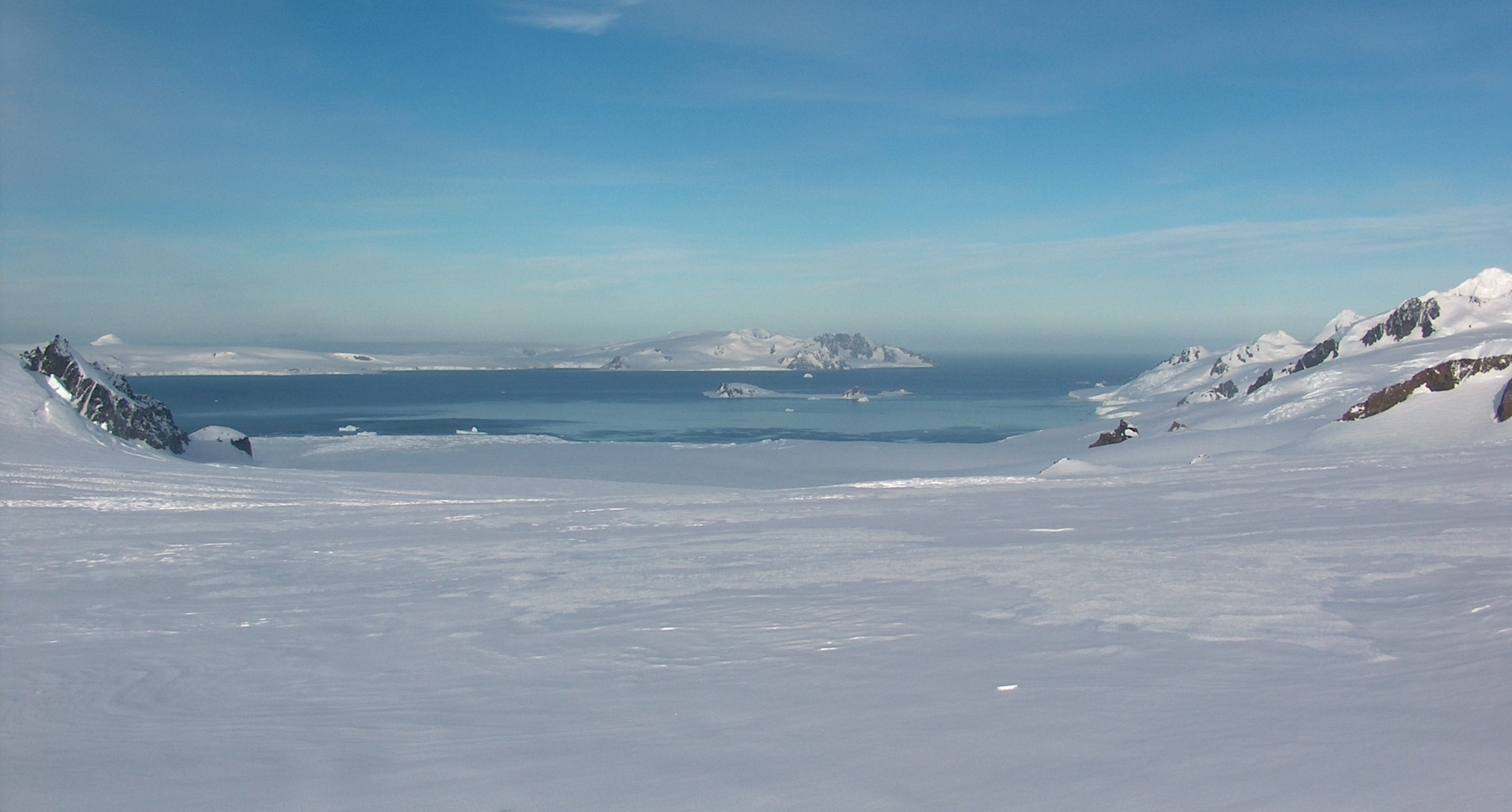
Half Moon Island from Camp Academia on Livingston Island, with Mugla Passage and Burgas Peninsula on the right, and Greenwich Island in the background.

Topographic map of Livingston Island and Smith Island.

Mugla Passage (Bulgarian: проток Мугла, ‘Protok Mugla’ \'pro-tok 'mu-gla\) is the 1.35 km wide passage between Half Moon Island and the north coast of Burgas Peninsula on Livingston Island in the South Shetland Islands, Antarctica.

The passage is named after the settlement of Mugla in southern Bulgaria.

== Location ==
Mugla Passage is located at 62°36′15″S 59°54′20″W. Bulgarian mapping in 2009.

== Map ==
- L.L. Ivanov. Antarctica: Livingston Island and Greenwich, Robert, Snow and Smith Islands. Scale 1:120000 topographic map. Troyan: Manfred Wörner Foundation, 2009. ISBN 978-954-92032-6-4
- Antarctic Digital Database (ADD). Scale 1:250000 topographic map of Antarctica. Scientific Committee on Antarctic Research (SCAR). Since 1993, regularly upgraded and updated.
- L.L. Ivanov. Antarctica: Livingston Island and Smith Island. Scale 1:100000 topographic map. Manfred Wörner Foundation, 2017. ISBN 978-619-90008-3-0
