= McFarlane Strait =

Strait in the South Shetland Islands

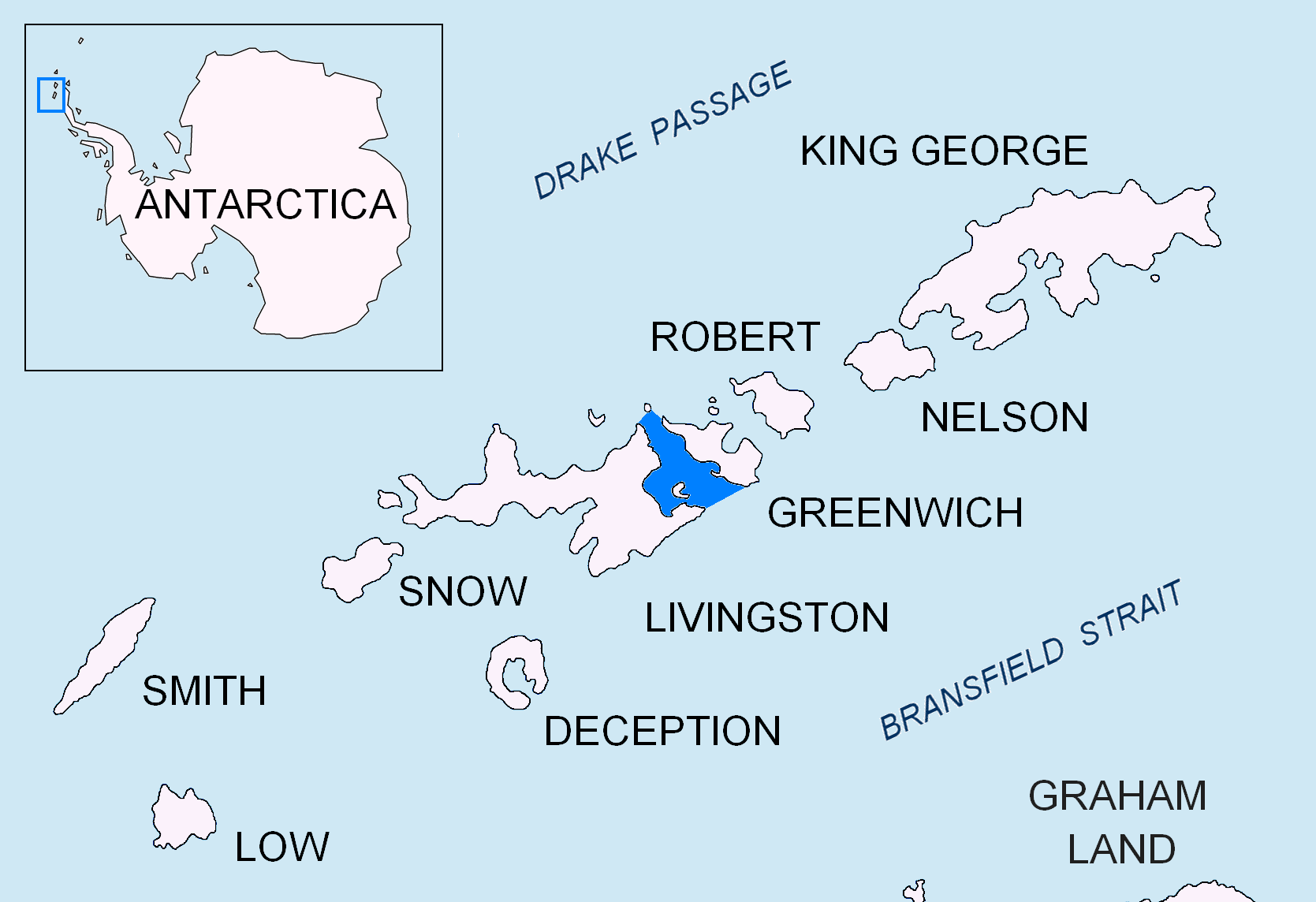
Location of McFarlane Strait in the South Shetland Islands

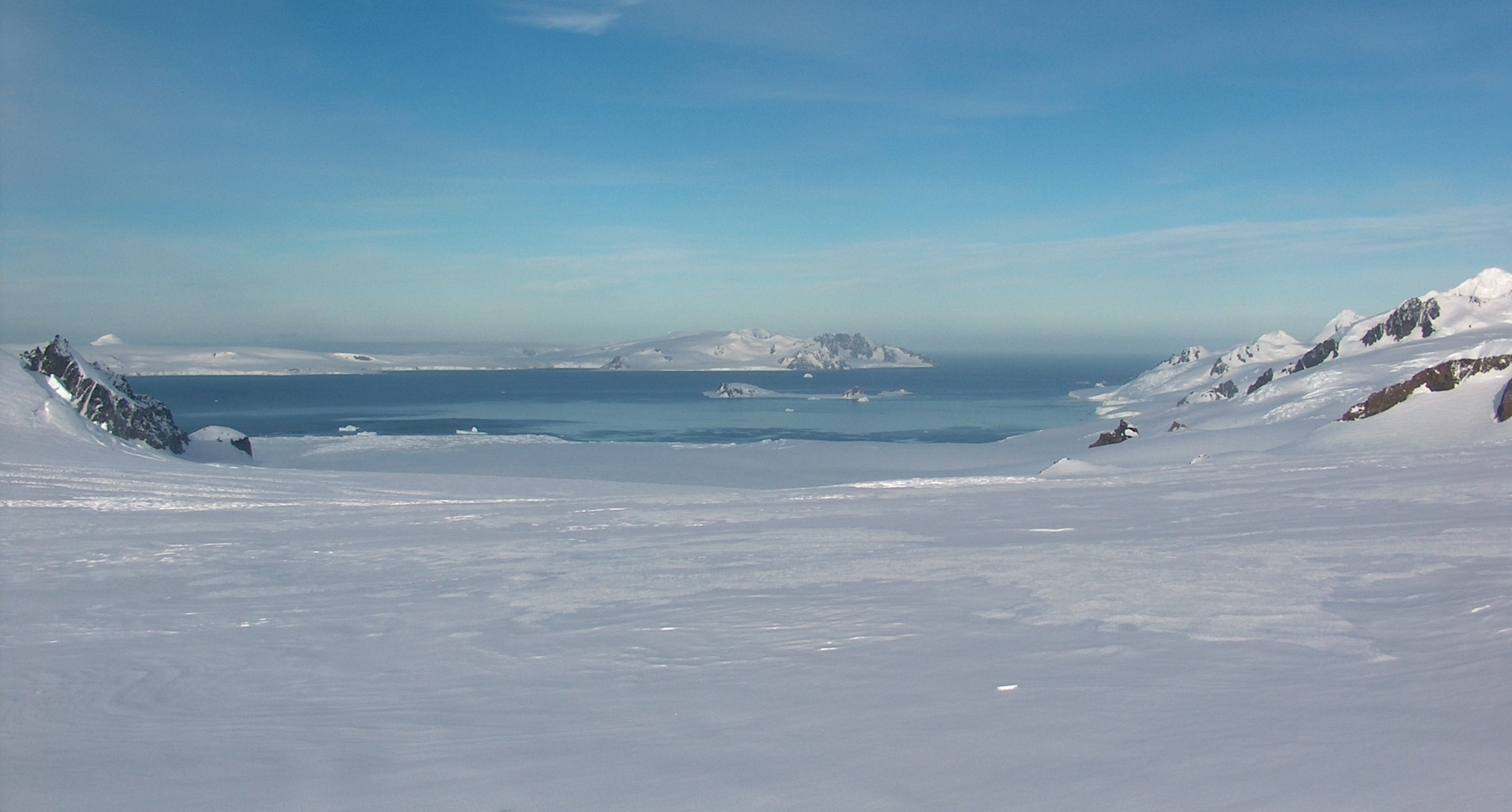
McFarlane Strait from Huron Glacier, Livingston Island with Half Moon Island and Greenwich Island in the background

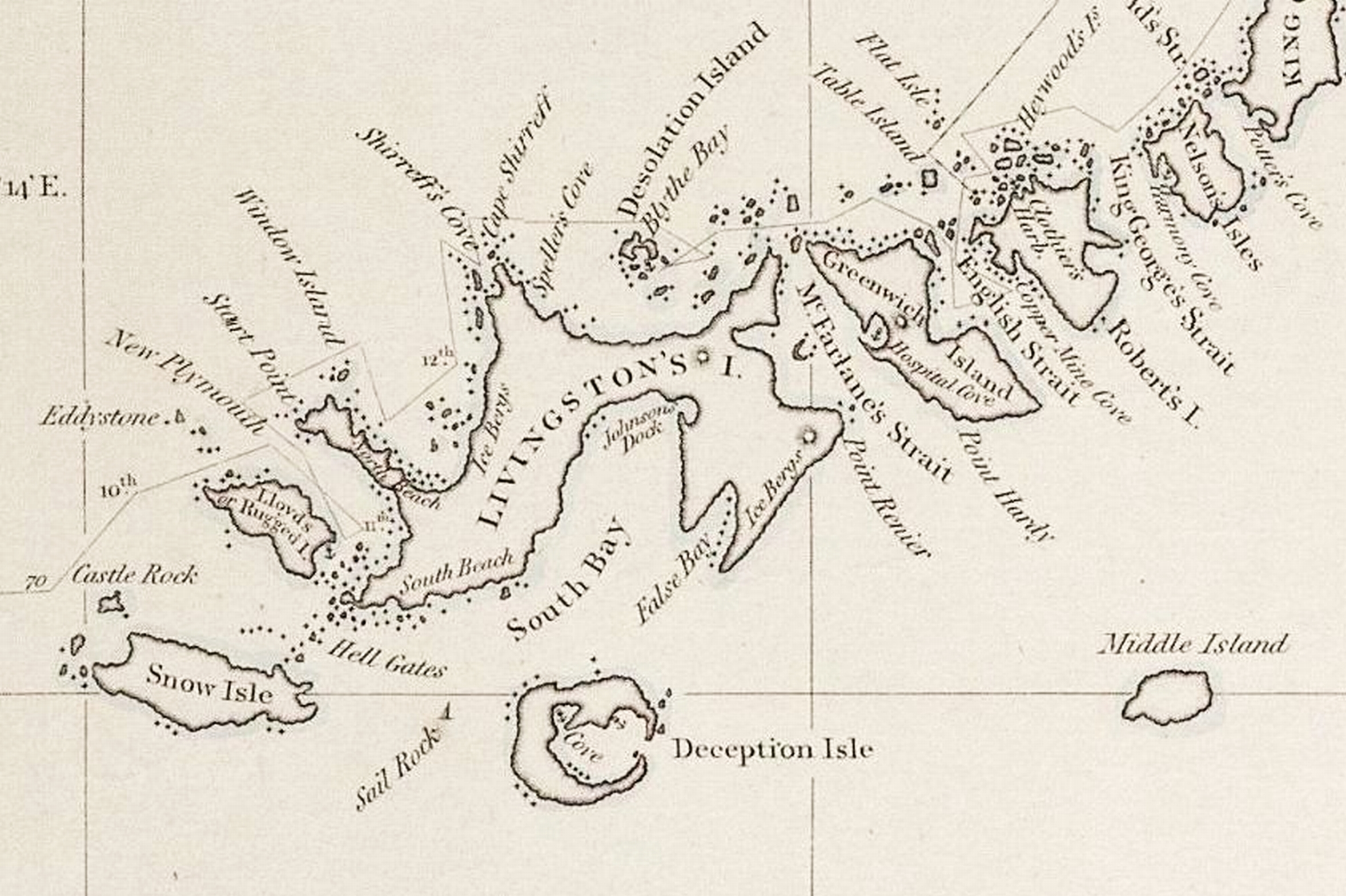
Fragment of George Powell's 1822 chart of the South Shetland Islands and South Orkney Islands featuring McFarlane Strait

Topographic map of McFarlane Strait

McFarlane Strait is a strait lying between Greenwich Island and Livingston Island, in the South Shetland Islands off Antarctica. It is 24 kilometres (13 nmi) long and 3 kilometres (1.6 nmi) wide. The name appears on an 1822 chart by Captain George Powell, a British sealer, and is now well established in international usage. It is named after the Scottish-born sailor Andrew MacFarlane.

== Location ==
The strait is centred at (62°32′S 59°55′W), and entered between Williams Point and Duff Point to the northwest and between Renier Point and Ephraim Bluff to the southeast (British mapping in 1822 and 1968, Chilean mapping in 1971, Argentine mapping in 1980, Spanish mapping in 1991, and Bulgarian mapping in 2005 and 2009).

== Maps ==
- Chart of South Shetland including Coronation Island, &c. from the exploration of the sloop Dove in the years 1821 and 1822 by George Powell Commander of the same. Scale ca. 1:200000. London: Laurie, 1822.
- South Shetland Islands. Scale 1:200000 topographic map. DOS 610 Sheet W 62 60. Tolworth, UK, 1968.
- South Shetland Islands. Scale 1:200000 topographic map. DOS 610 Sheet W 62 58. Tolworth, UK, 1968.
- Islas Livingston y Decepción. Mapa topográfico a escala 1:100000. Madrid: Servicio Geográfico del Ejército, 1991.
- L.L. Ivanov et al., Antarctica: Livingston Island and Greenwich Island, South Shetland Islands (from English Strait to Morton Strait, with illustrations and ice-cover distribution), 1:100000 scale topographic map, Antarctic Place-names Commission of Bulgaria, Sofia, 2005
- L.L. Ivanov. Antarctica: Livingston Island and Greenwich, Robert, Snow and Smith Islands. Scale 1:120000 topographic map. Troyan: Manfred Wörner Foundation, 2010. ISBN 978-954-92032-9-5 (First edition 2009. ISBN 978-954-92032-6-4)
- Antarctic Digital Database (ADD). Scale 1:250000 topographic map of Antarctica. Scientific Committee on Antarctic Research (SCAR). Since 1993, regularly updated.
- L.L. Ivanov. Antarctica: Livingston Island and Smith Island. Scale 1:100000 topographic map. Manfred Wörner Foundation, 2017. ISBN 978-619-90008-3-0

== See also ==
- Rugged Rocks
- Elemag Reef
- Half Moon Island
