= Potter Cove =

Body of water in Antarctica

Potter Cove Lighthouse
- Location: King George Island, Potter Cove, Argentina
- Coordinates: 62°14′03″S 58°39′17″W

Tower
- Construction: glass fiber (tower), concrete (foundation)
- Height: 23 ft (7.0 m)
- Shape: cylindrical tower with balcony and light
- Markings: red and yellow horizontal bands tower
- Power source: solar power
- Operator: Argentine Navy

Light
- Focal height: 10 m (33 ft)
- Range: 3 nmi (5.6 km; 3.5 mi)
- Characteristic: Fl W 7s

Potter Cove is a cove indenting the south-west side of King George Island to the east of Barton Peninsula, in the South Shetland Islands of Antarctica. An extinct volcano named Three Brothers Hill is located on its east side. Potter Cove was known to sealers as early as 1821, and the name is now well established in international usage.

== Historic site ==
The cove is the location of a replica of a metal plaque erected by German whaler and explorer Eduard Dallmann to commemorate the visit of his expedition, on 1 March 1874, with the sailing steamer Grönland. It has been designated a Historic Site or Monument (HSM 36), following a proposal by Argentina and the United Kingdom to the Antarctic Treaty Consultative Meeting.

== See also ==
- List of lighthouses in Antarctica
