= Half Moon Island =

Antarctic island in the South Shetland Islands

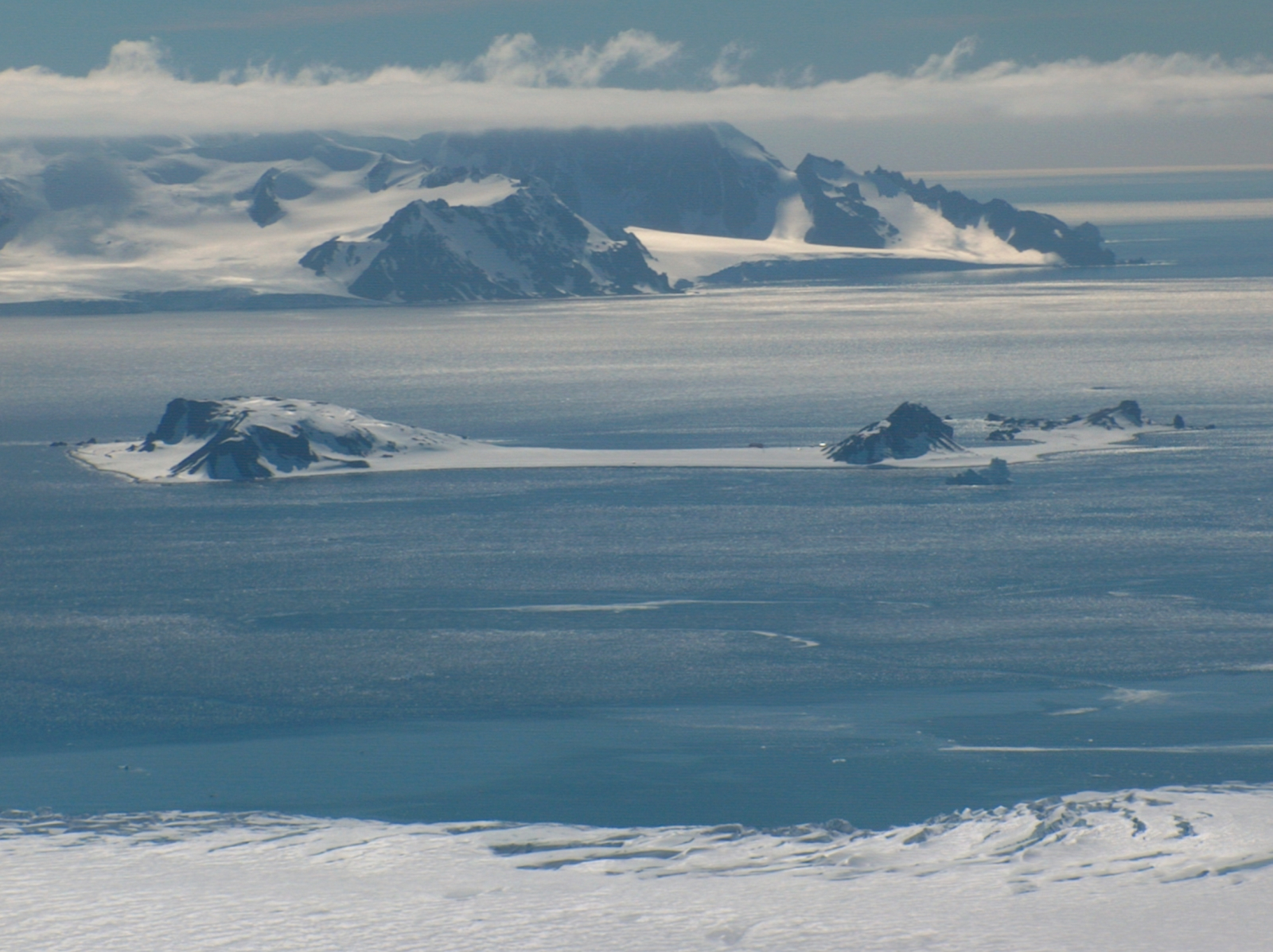
- Half Moon Island from Kuzman Knoll, Livingston Island, with Greenwich Island in the background

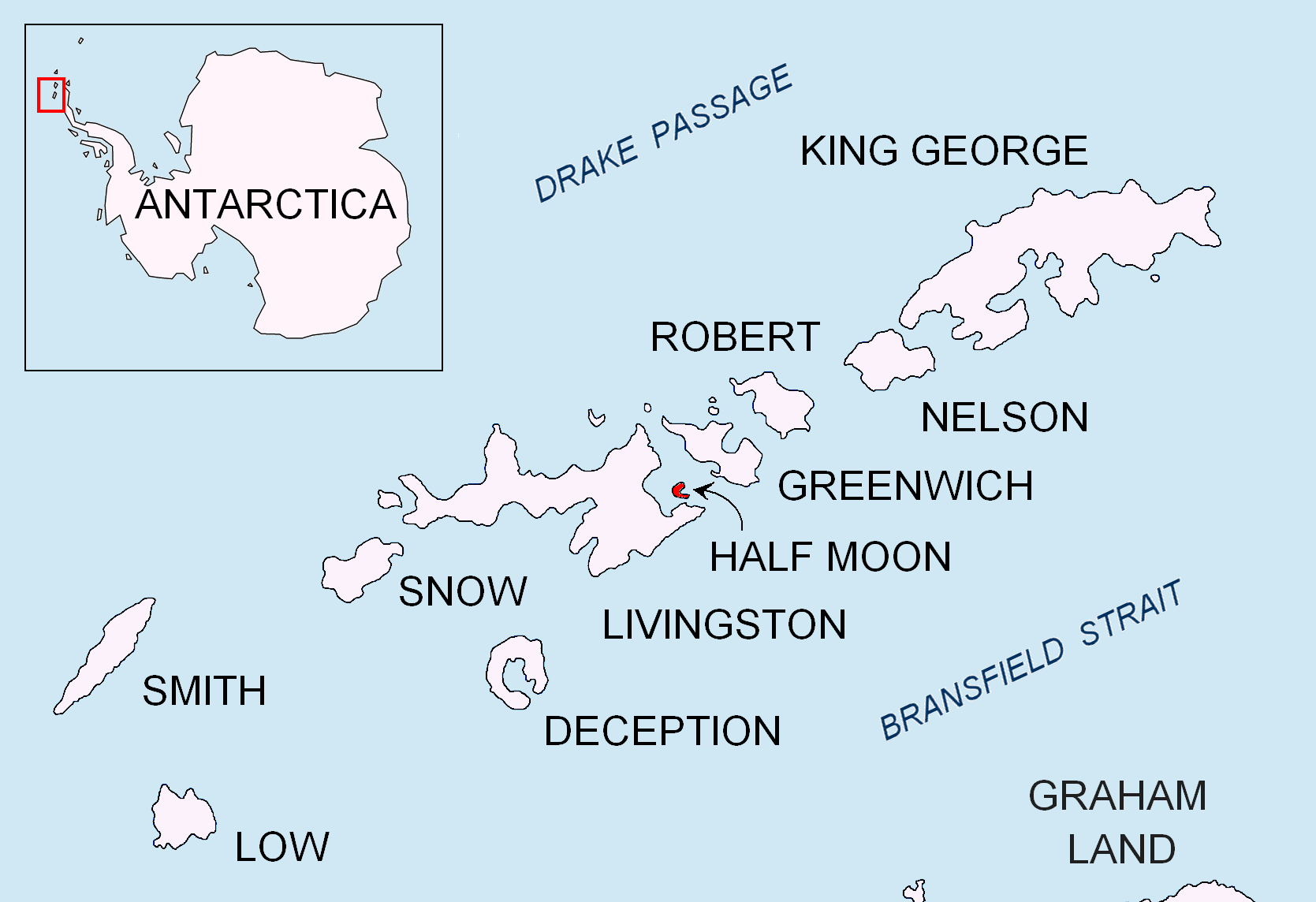

- Location on Antarctic Peninsula Location in Antarctica

Geography
- Location: Antarctica
- Coordinates: 62°35′24″S 59°54′36″W
- Archipelago: South Shetland Islands
- Area: 171 ha (420 acres)

Administration
- Administered under the Antarctic Treaty System

Demographics
- Population: Uninhabited

Half Moon Island is a minor Antarctic island, lying in McFarlane Strait 1.35 km (0.84 mi) north of Burgas Peninsula, Livingston Island in the South Shetland Islands of the Antarctic Peninsula region. Its surface area is 171 hectares (420 acres). The Argentine Cámara Base is located on the island. It is only accessible by sea and by helicopter; there is no airport of any kind. The naval base is operational occasionally during the summer, but is closed during the winter.

== Geology ==
The island is a series of gravel bars (tombolos) connecting volcanic bedrock islands. The north end of the island (Saddleback Ridge) is composed of andesitic intrusions of late Jurassic to Early Cretaceous rock. Near the Argentinian base is an intrusion of tonalite of early Cretaceous to early Tertiary. Near the chinstrap penguin colony the rock is intrusions of gabbro of the same age range. The southeastern tip is composed of andesitic lavas and lapilli stones of late Jurassic to Early Cretaceous. The parallel gravel bars are a result of post-glacial isostatic uplift of the area after the Pleistocene ice caps' retreat. Despite its shape, there is no evidence Half Moon Island is or ever was a volcanic crater.

== Ecology ==
In 1971, Denis C. Lindsay published Vegetation of the South Shetland Islands, and in doing so was the first person to report on the flora of Half Moon Island. In a 2018 publication, it was accepted that there were 37 species of moss and 59 species of lichen present on the island. The only vascular plant found is Antarctic hairgrass. Two macroscopic terrestrial algae are also present - Prasiola crispa and Prasiola calophylla.

The island has been identified as an Important Bird Area (IBA) by BirdLife International because it supports a breeding colony of about 100 pairs of south polar skuas. Other birds nesting on the island include chinstrap penguins (2000 pairs), Antarctic terns (125 pairs), kelp gulls (40 pairs), Wilson's and black-bellied storm petrels, Cape petrels, brown skuas, snowy sheathbills and imperial shags.

Weddell and Antarctic fur seals regularly haul out on the beaches. Southern elephant seals have been recorded. Whales are often seen patrolling the shores.

== Tourism and accessibility ==
The island is used as a stop during Antarctic cruises, with the peak of visitation during November–March. There is a 2,000 m (2,200 yd) walking track on the southern part of the Island which allows tourists to get a close view of the wildlife (mainly chinstrap penguins and skuas), and of the surrounding mountainous scenery of nearby Livingston and Greenwich Islands. The path begins on the south side of Menguante Cove, runs westwards along the beach to Cámara Base, then turns north along the head of Menguante Cove, and eventually ascends northeastwards to the top of Xenia Hill.

=== Google Street View ===
In September 2010, Google added Street View imagery of Half Moon Island to its Google Earth and Google Maps services. The expansion of Google Street View onto the island means all seven continents had imagery through the service. As the island has no roads, the images appear to have been taken with a camera on a tripod. The shadow of the photographer can clearly be seen if one were to move the view so as to look at the ground. Also, the iconic Pegman from Google was replaced with a Penguin, due to the island's use as a breeding colony by them. The penguin has since been changed back to Pegman.

== Gallery ==
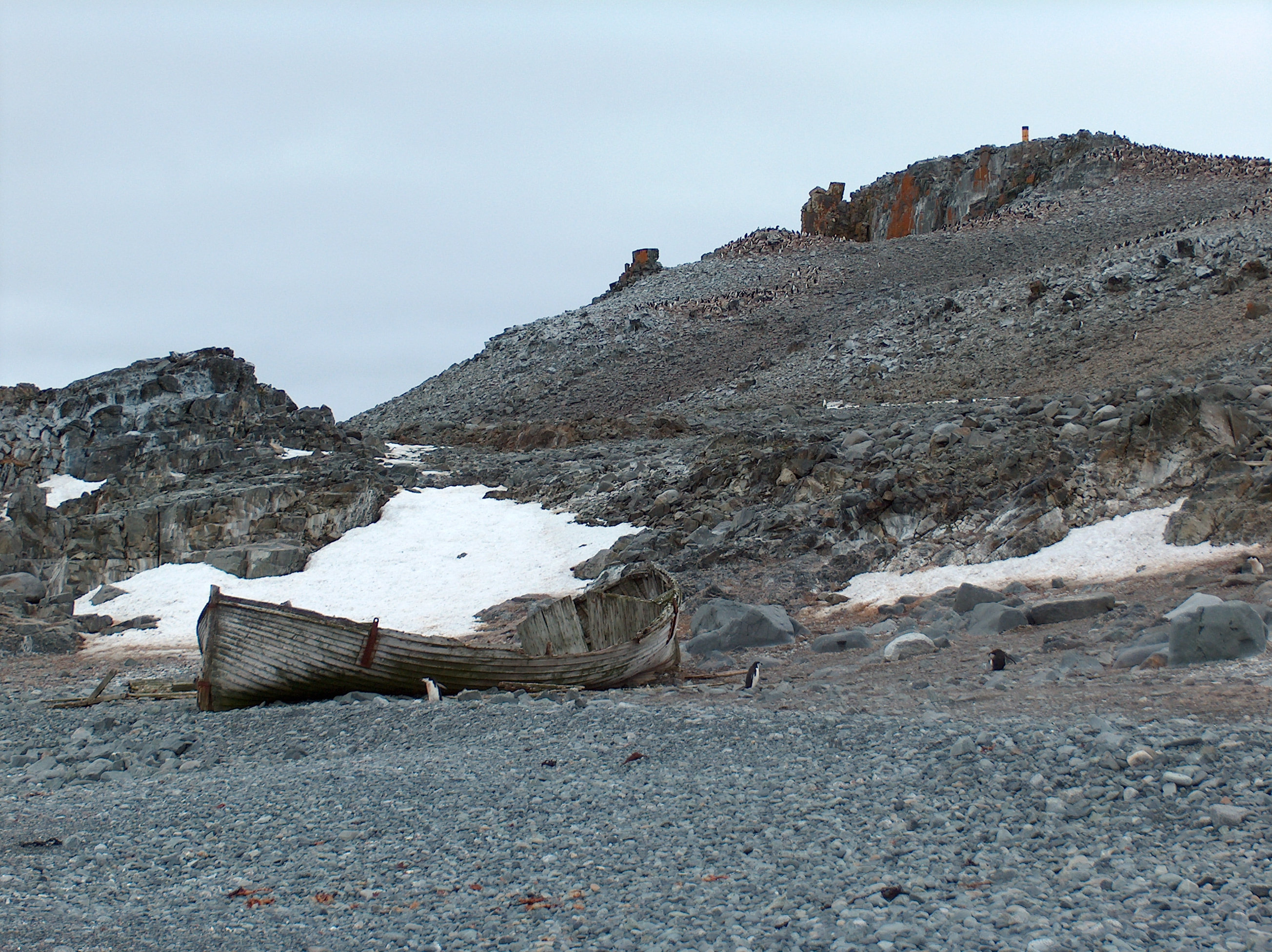
The wreck of an old whaling boat, located at the south end of Island

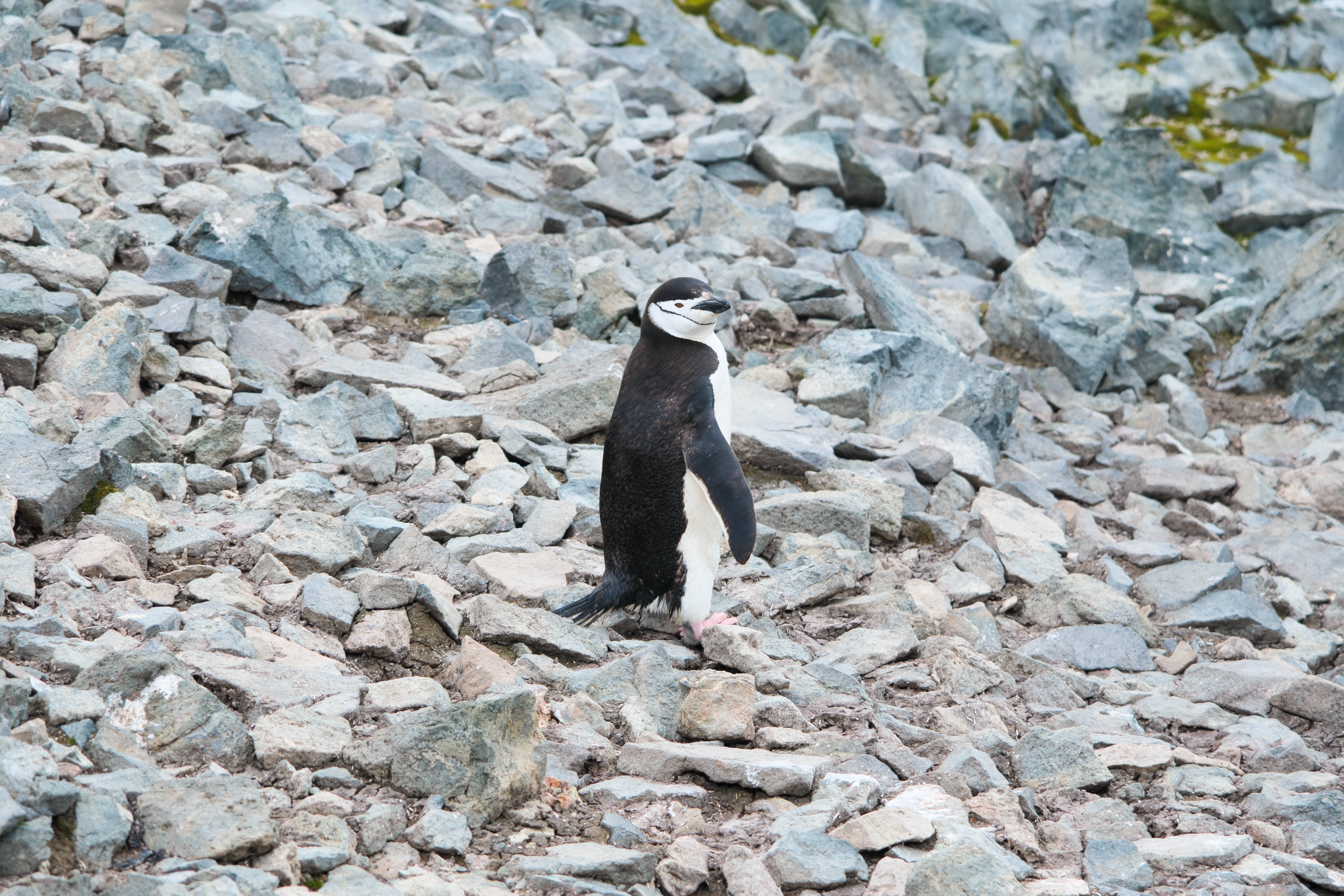
Pygoscelis antarcticus on Half Moon Island

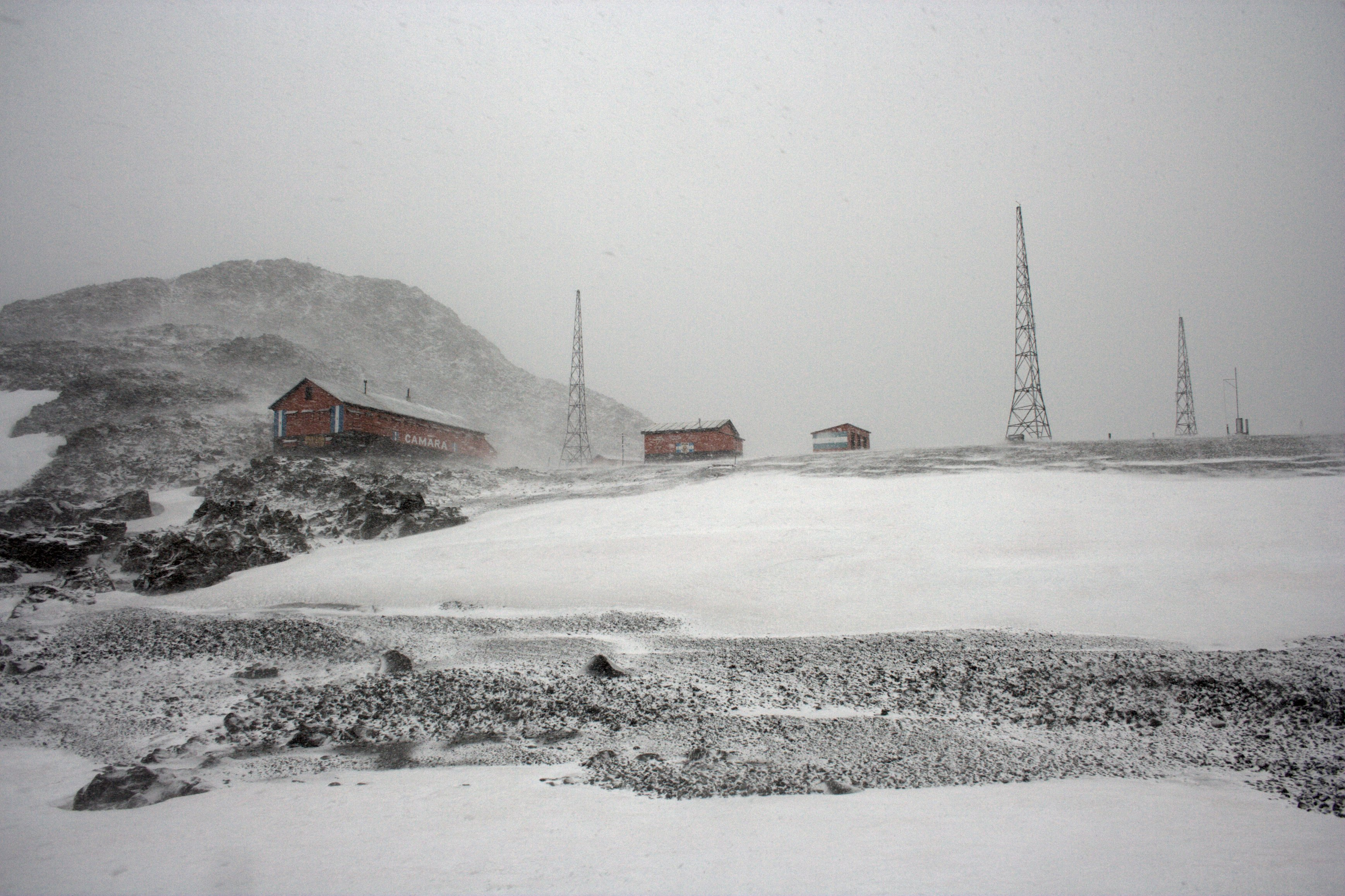
View of Cámara Base

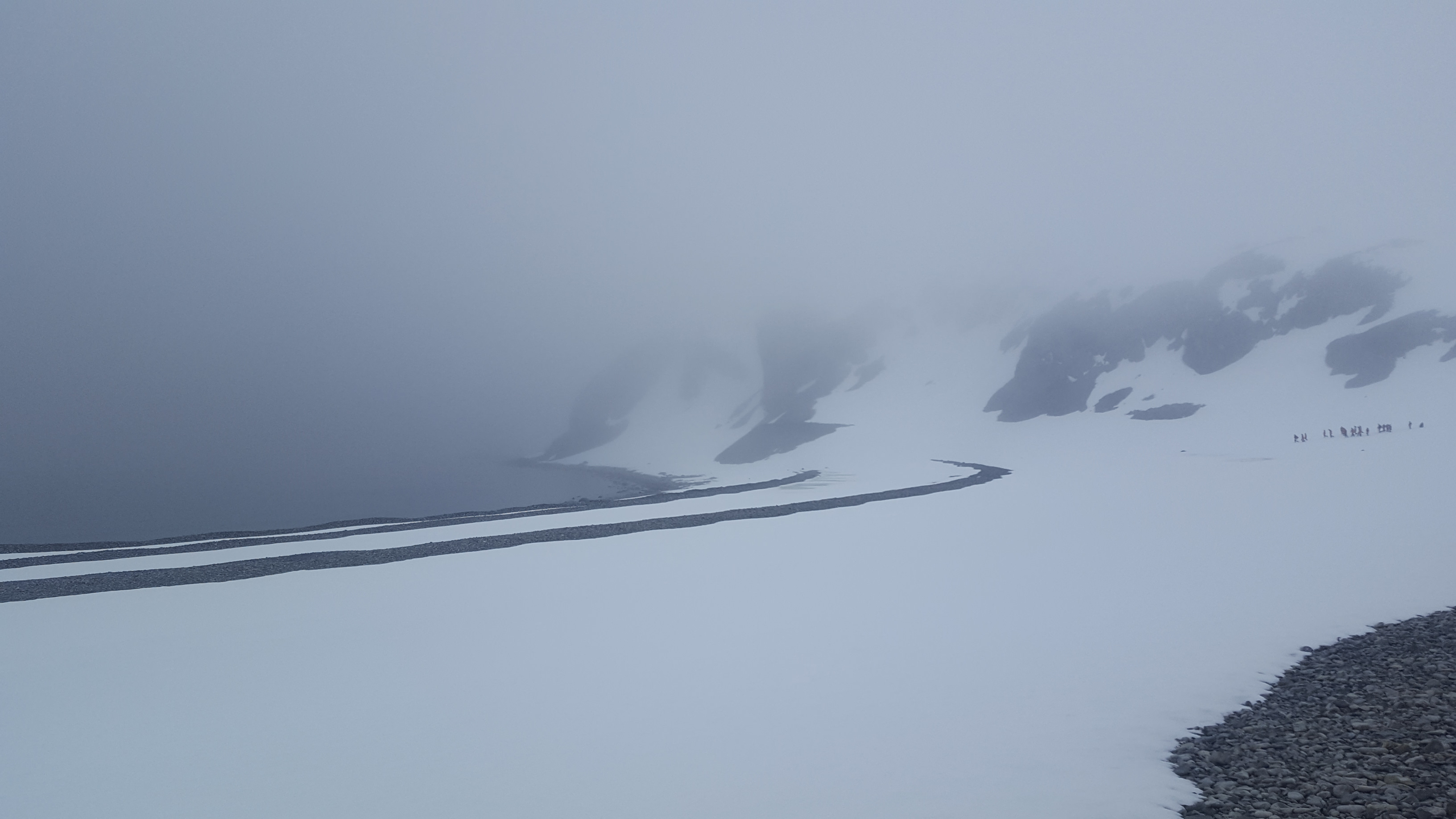
Parallel gravel bars of Half Moon Island

Half Moon Island map

== See also ==
- Composite Antarctic Gazetteer
- List of Antarctic islands south of 60° S
- Livingston Island
- Saddleback Ridge
- SCAR
- Territorial claims in Antarctica

== Maps ==
- Chart of South Shetland including Coronation Island, &c. from the exploration of the sloop Dove in the years 1821 and 1822 by George Powell Commander of the same. Scale ca. 1:200000. London: Laurie, 1822.
- L.L. Ivanov et al., Antarctica: Livingston Island and Greenwich Island, South Shetland Islands (from English Strait to Morton Strait, with illustrations and ice-cover distribution), 1:100000 scale topographic map, Antarctic Place-names Commission of Bulgaria, Sofia, 2005
- L.L. Ivanov. Antarctica: Livingston Island and Greenwich, Robert, Snow and Smith Islands. Scale 1:120000 topographic map. Troyan: Manfred Wörner Foundation, 2009. ISBN 978-954-92032-6-4
- Antarctic Digital Database (ADD). Scale 1:250000 topographic map of Antarctica. Scientific Committee on Antarctic Research (SCAR). Since 1993, regularly updated.
- L.L. Ivanov. Antarctica: Livingston Island and Smith Island. Scale 1:100000 topographic map. Manfred Wörner Foundation, 2017. ISBN 978-619-90008-3-0
