= Burgas Peninsula =

Peninsula of Livingston Island in Antarctica

- Peninsula
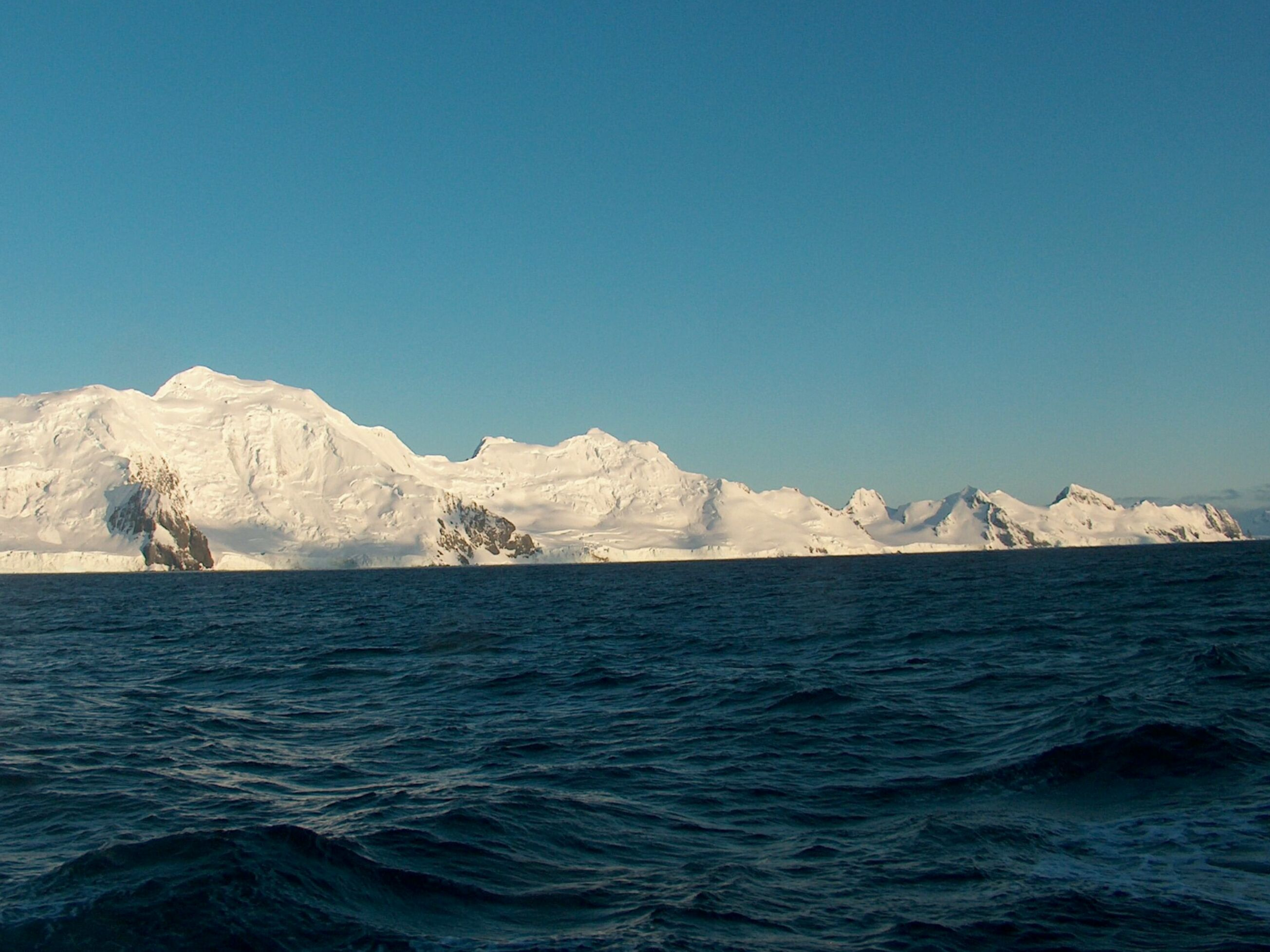
- Burgas Peninsula from Bransfield Strait

- Location within Antarctica
- Coordinates: 62°37′40″S 59°54′00″W
- Location: Livingston Island, South Shetland Islands, Antarctica
- Etymology: Burgas, Bulgaria

Dimensions
  - Length: 10 km (6.2 mi)
  - Width: 4.7 km (2.9 mi)

Burgas Peninsula (Bulgarian: полуостров Бургас, romanized: poluostrov Burgas, IPA: [poɫuˈɔstrov borˈɡas]) is a predominantly ice-covered peninsula forming the east extremity of Livingston Island in the South Shetland Islands, Antarctica extending 10 km (6.2 mi) in the east-northeast direction towards Renier Point and 4.7 km (2.9 mi). It is bounded by Bruix Cove, Moon Bay and Mugla Passage to the north, and Bransfield Strait to the south-southeast. The peninsula's interior is occupied by the Delchev Ridge of Tangra Mountains.

== Name origin ==
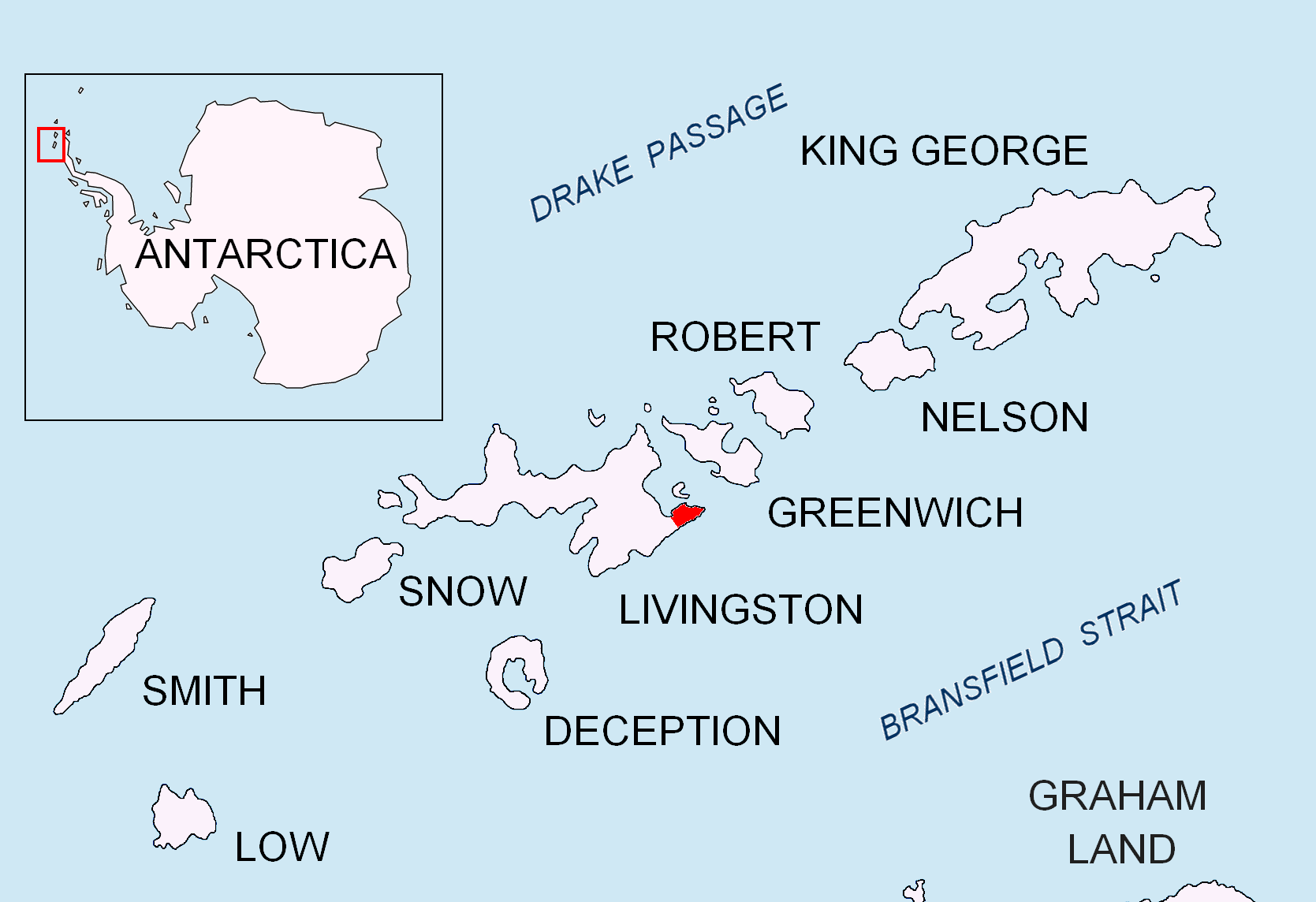
Location of Burgas Peninsula on Livingston Island in the South Shetland Islands.

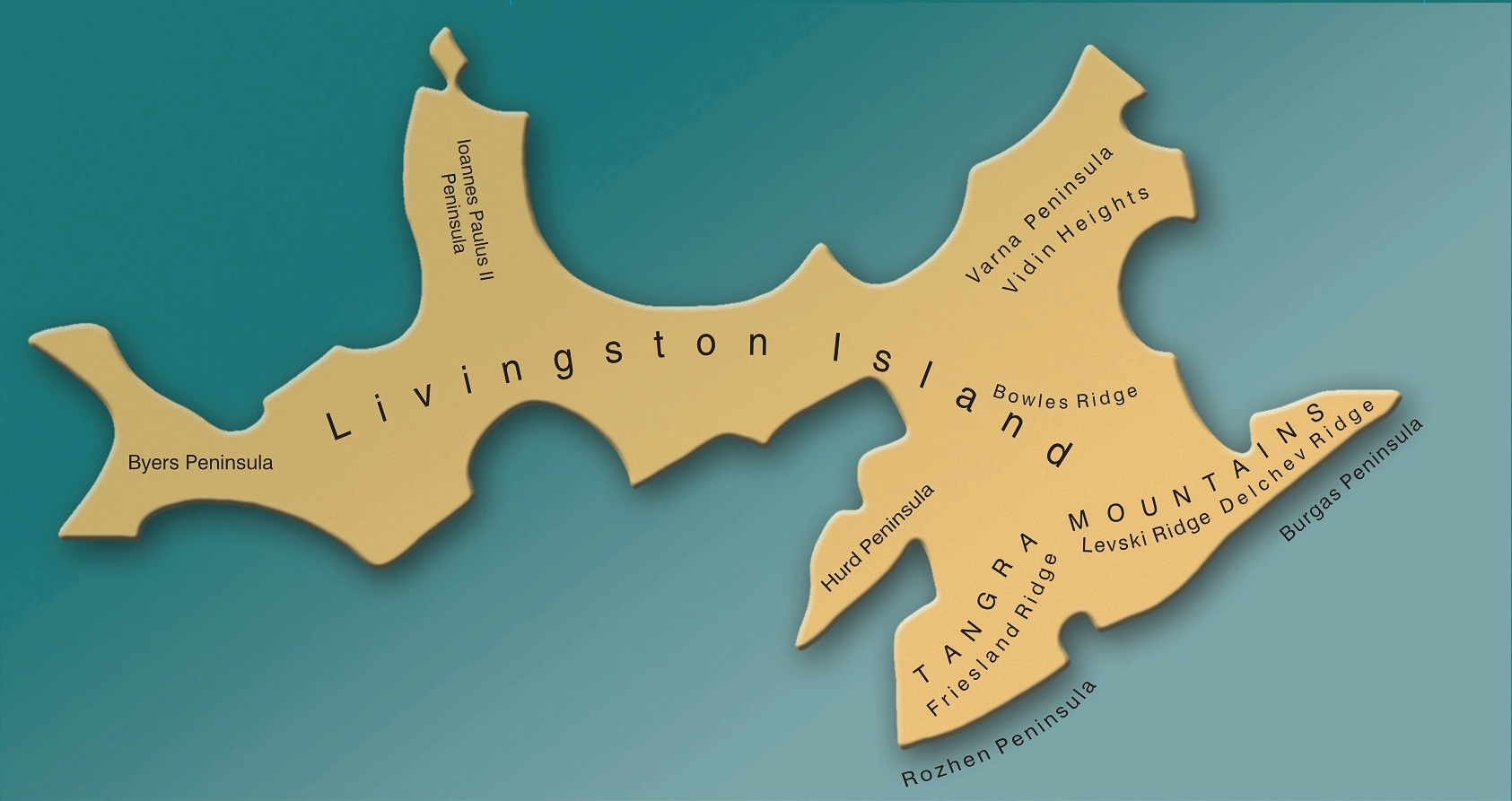
Livingston Island peninsulas.

Burgas Peninsula is named after the Bulgarian city of Burgas, and in connection with the company Ocean Fisheries – Burgas whose ships operated in the waters of South Georgia, Kerguelen, the South Orkney Islands, South Shetland Islands and Antarctic Peninsula from 1970 to the early 1990s. The Bulgarian fishermen, along with those of the Soviet Union, Poland and East Germany are the pioneers of modern Antarctic fishing industry.”

== Location ==
The peninsula is centred at 62°37′40″S 59°54′00″W. British mapping in 1822 and 1968, Chilean in 1971, Argentine in 1980, Spanish mapping in 1991, and Bulgarian topographic survey Tangra 2004/05 and mapping in 2005 and 2009.

== See also ==
- Delchev Ridge
- Livingston Island
- Rugged Rocks

== Maps ==
- L.L. Ivanov et al. Antarctica: Livingston Island and Greenwich Island, South Shetland Islands. Scale 1:100000 topographic map. Sofia: Antarctic Place-names Commission of Bulgaria, 2005.
- L.L. Ivanov. Antarctica: Livingston Island and Greenwich, Robert, Snow and Smith Islands. Scale 1:120000 topographic map. Troyan: Manfred Wörner Foundation, 2010. ISBN 978-954-92032-9-5 (First edition 2009. ISBN 978-954-92032-6-4)
- Antarctic Digital Database (ADD). Scale 1:250000 topographic map of Antarctica. Scientific Committee on Antarctic Research (SCAR). Since 1993, regularly upgraded and updated.
- L.L. Ivanov. Antarctica: Livingston Island and Smith Island. Scale 1:100000 topographic map. Manfred Wörner Foundation, 2017. ISBN 978-619-90008-3-0
