= Menguante Cove =

Embayment in the South Shetland Islands, Antarctica

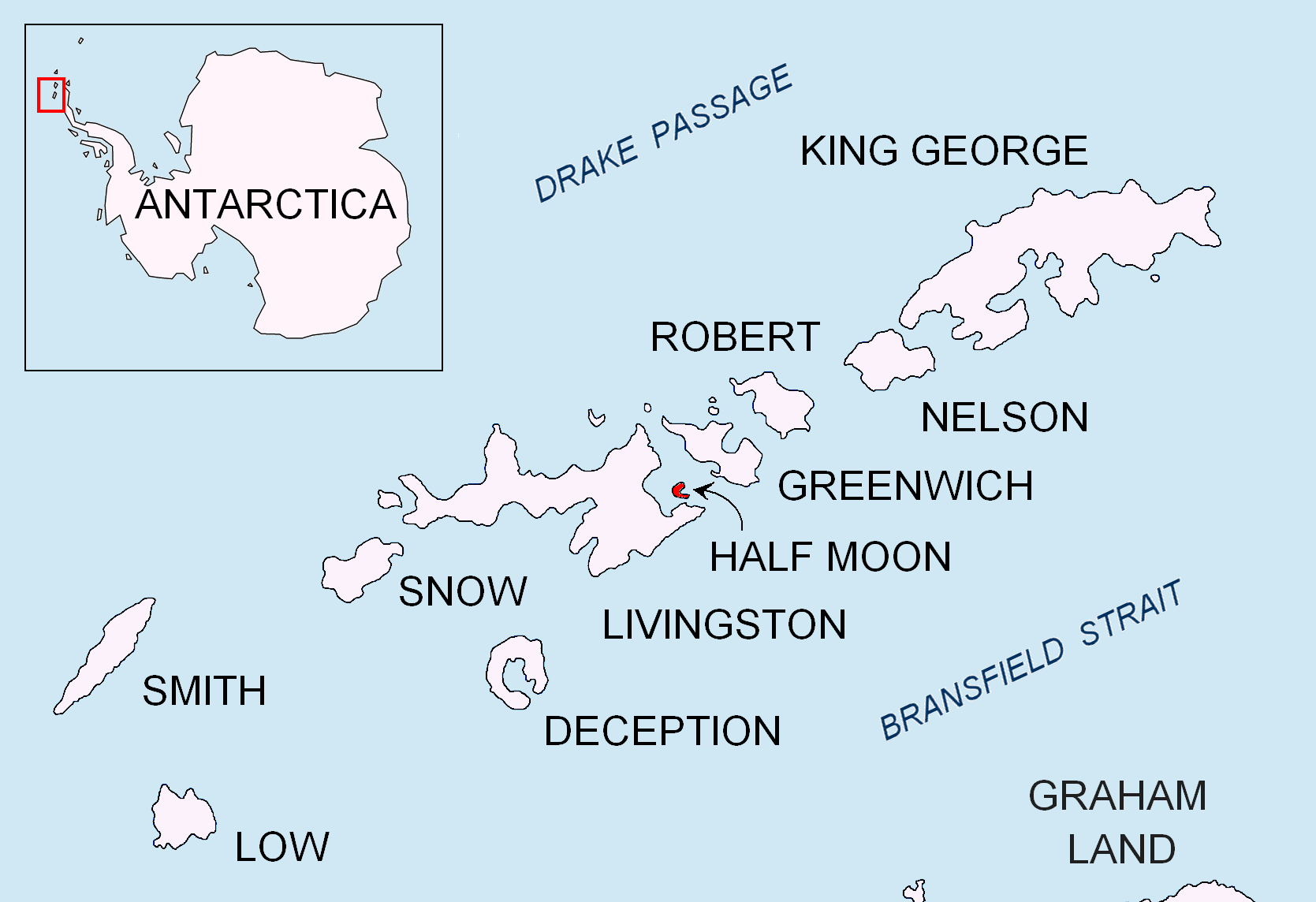
Location of Half Moon Island in the South Shetland Islands

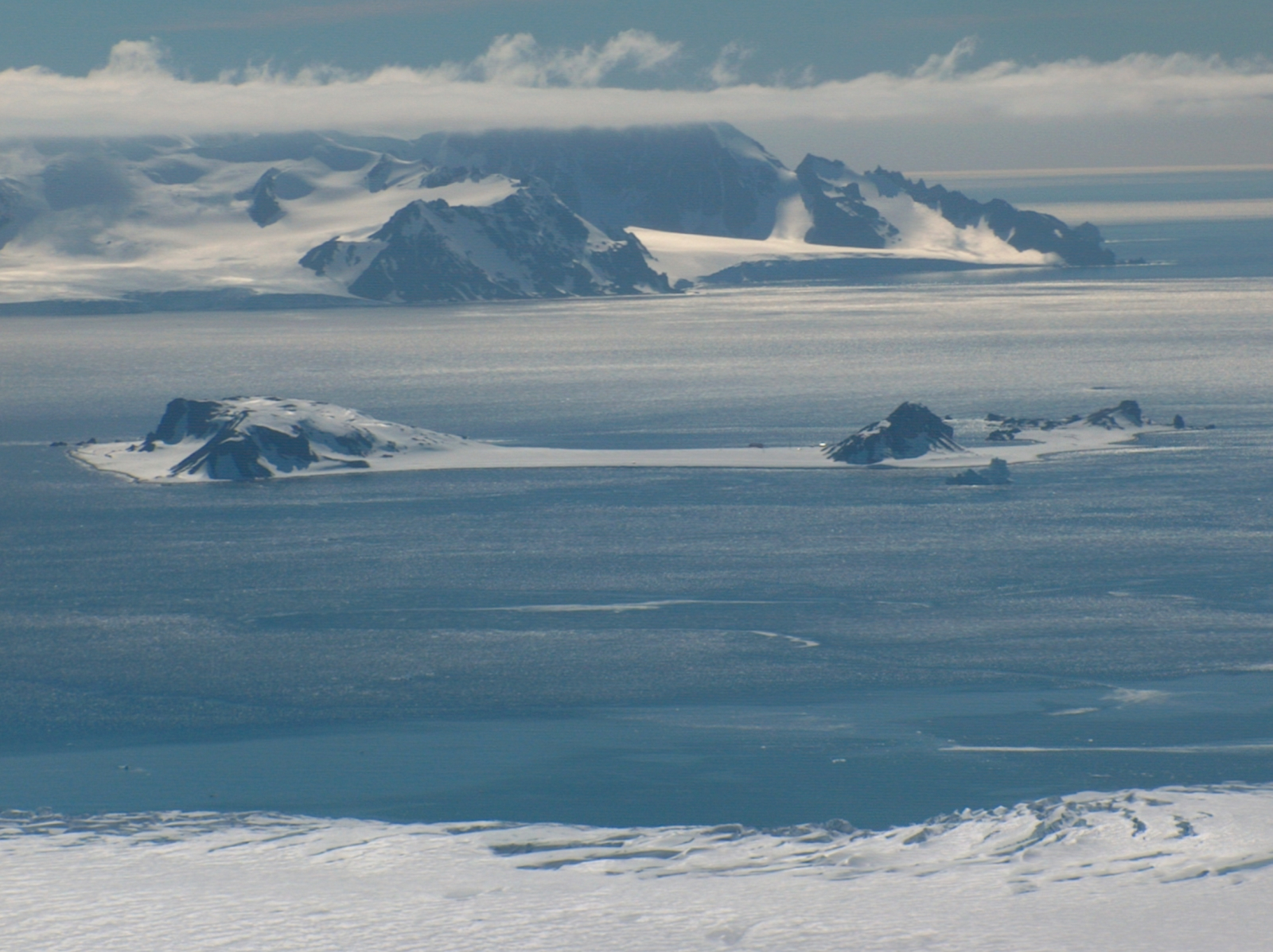
Menguante Cove (on the far side of Half Moon Island) from Kuzman Knoll, Livingston Island, with Greenwich Island in the background

Topographic map of Livingston Island, Greenwich, Robert, Snow and Smith Islands

Menguante Cove is a 1.47 km wide embayment indenting for 1.22 km the east coast of the horseshoe-shaped Half Moon Island in the South Shetland Islands, Antarctica. The area was visited by early 19th century sealers operating from nearby Yankee Harbour, and later by whalers; a whaling dory lies on the main landing beach on the southeast coast of the cove. Nowadays Menguante Cove is frequented by Antarctic cruise ships.

The Argentine Antarctic base Cámara is situated at the cove's head.

== Location ==
The cove's midpoint is located at 62°35′28″S 59°54′20″W which is 5.51 km west-northwest of Renier Point, 4.7 km northeast of Rila Point, 7.89 km southeast of Edinburgh Hill, 8.32 km south-southwest of Triangle Point and 10.25 km west-southwest of Ephraim Bluff (British mapping in 1822 and 1968, Chilean in 1971, Argentine in 1980 and 2000, and Bulgarian in 2005 and 2009).

== Maps ==
- Chart of South Shetland including Coronation Island, &c. from the exploration of the sloop Dove in the years 1821 and 1822 by George Powell Commander of the same. Scale ca. 1:200000. London: Laurie, 1822.
- L.L. Ivanov et al. Antarctica: Livingston Island and Greenwich Island, South Shetland Islands. Scale 1:100000 topographic map. Sofia: Antarctic Place-names Commission of Bulgaria, 2005.
- L.L. Ivanov. Antarctica: Livingston Island and Greenwich, Robert, Snow and Smith Islands. Scale 1:120000 topographic map. Troyan: Manfred Wörner Foundation, 2009. ISBN 978-954-92032-6-4
