= Kyriaki, Evros =

Kyriaki Κυριακή
- Community
- Location within Greece
- Coordinates: 41°18′N 26°12′E
- Country: Greece
- Administrative region: East Macedonia and Thrace
- Regional unit: Evros
- Municipality: Soufli
- Municipal unit: Orfeas

Population (2021)
  - Community: 73
- Time zone: UTC+2 (EET)
  - Summer (DST): UTC+3 (EEST)

Kyriaki (Greek: Κυριακή) is a village in the central part of the Evros regional unit in Greece, in the municipal unit of Orfeas of the municipality Soufli. With 100 inhabitants (2011 census) it is the least populated community in the municipal unit. Kyriaki is in a valley in the wooded Eastern Rhodope Mountains, 15 km southeast of the Bulgarian-Greek border. It is situated between the villages Mikro Dereio and Protokklisi.

== Population ==
Year	Population
1878	350
1912	230
1920	150
1981	258
1991	219
2001	163
2011	100
2021	73

== History ==
The village was founded by the Ottoman Turks in the 14th century, it was known as Kayadjik(Turkish: Kayajik). Its population was 310 Bulgarian families in 1830, 236 families (houses) in 1878, and 230 families in 1912. According to professor Lyubomir Miletich, the 1912 population had around 200 Bulgarian families. After a brief period of Bulgarian rule between 1913 and 1919, it became part of Greece. As a result its Bulgarian and Turkish population was exchanged with Greek refugees, mainly from today's Turkey.

== Person ==
- Nikola Atanasov Spirov (1908-?), Bulgarian leader of the Internal Thracian Revolutionary Organisation (1944–1961)

== See also ==
- List of settlements in the Evros regional unit
