= Sanjak of Dedeağaç =

Sancak-i Dedeağaç
- Sanjak of the Ottoman Empire
- 1878–1912
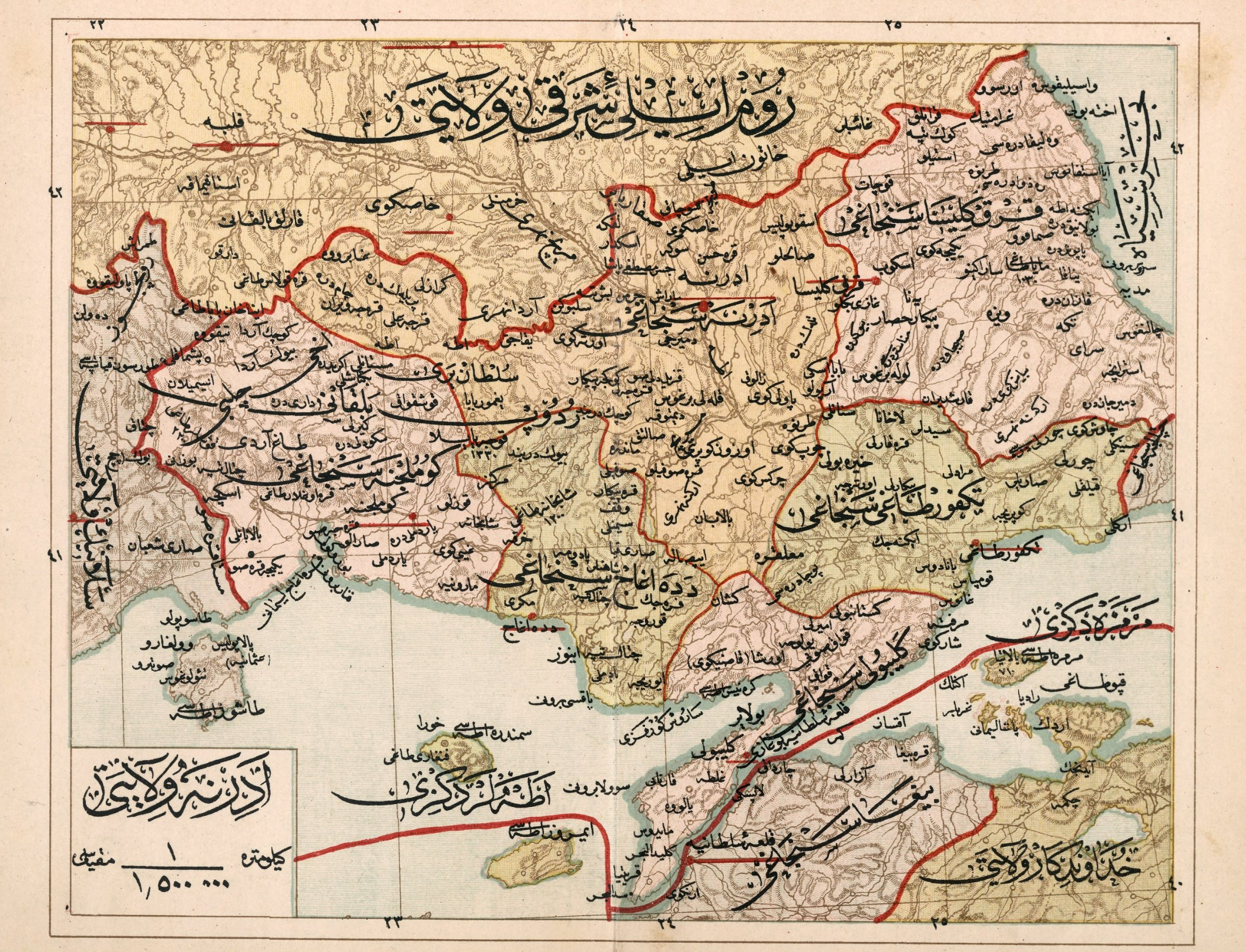
- 1907 Ottoman map of the Adrianople Vilayet, including the Sanjak of Dedeağaç in the lower middle
- Capital: Dimetoka (1878–1884), Dedeağaç (1878–1912)
- History
  - Established: 1878
  - First Balkan War: 1912
Preceded by	Succeeded by
Sanjak of Adrianople; Sanjak of Gallipoli	Kingdom of Bulgaria; Ottoman Empire
- Today part of: Greece; Turkey

The Sanjak of Dedeağaç (Ottoman Turkish: Liva-i Dedeağaç, Greek: Υποδιοίκησις Δεδέαγατς), originally in 1878–1884 the Sanjak of Dimetoka (Liva-i Dimetoka, Υποδιοίκησις Διδυμοτείχου), was a second-level province (sanjak) of the Ottoman Empire in Thrace, forming part of the Adrianople Vilayet. Its capital was Dedeağaç, modern Alexandroupolis in Greece.

== History and administrative division ==
The sanjak was created in 1878 out of the territory of the sanjaks of Gallipoli and Adrianople, as well as the island of Samothrace, which had hitherto belonged to the Vilayet of the Archipelago. The capital was originally at Dimetoka (Didymoteicho), but was moved to Dedeağaç (Alexandroupolis) in 1884. Dimetoka itself later returned under the sanjak of Adrianople.

It comprised three sub-provinces or kazas, which were further subdivided into nahiyes:

- Kaza of Dedeağaç (mod. Alexandroupolis): Ferecik, Mekri, Sahinler, Samothrace (Tr. Semendrek), Doğanhišar
- Kaza of Sofulu (mod. Soufli): Pitikli, Pessani|Pisman, Kamberler-i Bala, Dervent, Ede, Ipsala
- Kaza of Enez: Enez or Koca Ali.

Of these, the kaza of Dedeağaç and most of the kaza of Sofulu lie today in Greece, while the kaza of Enez with the parts of the kaza of Sofulu east of the Evros river lie in Turkey.

The sanjak survived until it was occupied by Bulgarian troops in the First Balkan War (1912–1913), after which the portion west of the Evros became a Bulgarian (and after 1919, Greek) province, while the eastern remained under Turkish control (except for the period 1919–1922, when it was under Allied and then Greek control).
