= Mega Dereio =

Mega Dereio Μέγα Δέρειο
- Settlement
- Location within Greece
- Coordinates: 41°14′N 26°01′E
- Country: Greece
- Administrative region: East Macedonia and Thrace
- Regional unit: Evros
- Municipality: Soufli
- Municipal unit: Orfeas
- Community: Mikro Dereio

Population (2021)
  - Total: 528
- Time zone: UTC+2 (EET)
  - Summer (DST): UTC+3 (EEST)

Mega Dereio (Greek: Μέγα Δέρειο) is a village in the central part of the Evros regional unit in Greece. It is part of the municipal unit of Orfeas within the municipality of Soufli. Together with 6 other villages, it forms the community of Mikro Dereio. It is situated near the upper course of the river Erythropotamos, in the Eastern Rhodope Mountains. The Greek National Road 53 (Alexandroupoli – Mikro Dereio – Kyprinos – Ormenio) passes through the village.

== Population ==
Year	Village population
1991	561
2001	545
2011	528
2021	528

== History ==
The village was founded by the Ottoman Turks in the 14th century. It was known as Büyük Dervent in Turkish, and Голям Дервент Golyam Dervent in Bulgarian. According to Anastas Razboynikov, in 1830 the village numbered 700 Bulgarian and 50 Turk houses, in 1878 400 Bulgarian and 80 Turks houses and in 1912 420 Bulgarian and 80 Turk houses. According to professor Lyubomir Miletich, the 1912 population had around 300 Bulgarian families and 100 Turk families.

In August 1913 the village was attacked by Turkish troops and irregulars and despite the resistance of the local Bulgarians the bigger part of Golyam Dervent was burned. Many of the villagers were killed, many women were raped. Some residents found shelter in Doganhisar, Dedeagatch or Bulgaria.

After a brief period of Bulgarian rule between 1913 and 1919, it became part of Greece. As a result, its Bulgarian and Turkish population was exchanged with Greek refugees, mainly from today's Turkey. 300 Bulgarians moved northward into Burgas, Mokren (4 families), Zagortsi (4 families), Veselie, Mamarčevo, Sokolentsi (2 families) and other villages in Bulgaria. The name of the village was translated into Greek and became Mega Dereio.

== See also ==
- List of settlements in the Evros regional unit
