= Greek National Road 53 =

Trunk road in Greece

Coordinates: 41.2345°N 26.0397°E

National Road 53
- Εθνική Οδός 53
- Route of the EO53 road, in blue

Route information
- Length: 89.8 km (55.8 mi)
- Existed: 9 July 1963–present

Major junctions
- South end: Alexandroupolis
- North end: Mikro Dereio

Location
- Country: Greece
- Regions: Eastern Macedonia and Thrace
- Primary destinations: Alexandroupolis; Aisymi; Mega Dereio; Mikro Dereio

Highway system
- Highways in Greece; Motorways; National roads
← EO51	→ EO54

Greek National Road 53 (Greek: Εθνική Οδός 53), abbreviated as the EO53, is a national road in northeastern Greece. The EO53 runs within the Evros regional unit, from Alexandroupolis to Mikro Dereio near the border with Bulgaria: however, the border crossing itself is unbuilt.

== Route ==
The EO53 is officially defined as a north–south road within the Evros regional unit: the road runs between Alexandroupolis and Mikro Dereio, via Aisymi and Mega Dereio: however, the border crossing itself, over the Erythropotamos and towards Gorno Lukovo, is unbuilt. The EO53 connects with the EO2 in Alexandroupolis, but there is no direct interchange with the A2 motorway, which bypasses the city.

== History ==
Ministerial Decision G25871 of 9 July 1963 created the EO53 from the old EO49, which existed by royal decree from 1955 until 1963, and followed the same route as the current EO53.
