= Amorio, Evros =

Amorio Αμόριο
- Community
- Location within Greece
- Coordinates: 41°18′N 26°26′E
- Country: Greece
- Administrative region: East Macedonia and Thrace
- Regional unit: Evros
- Municipality: Soufli
- Municipal unit: Orfeas
- Elevation: 30 m (98 ft)

Population (2021)
  - Community: 317
- Time zone: UTC+2 (EET)
  - Summer (DST): UTC+3 (EEST)
- Postal code: 680 04
- Area code: 25530

Amorio (Greek: Αμόριο, romanized: Amório, IPA: [aˈmoɾi.o]) is a village in the municipal unit of Orfeas, northeastern Evros, Greece. It is situated at 2 km from the right bank of the river Evros, that forms the border with Turkey here. Amorio is 6 km northeast of Lavara, 7 km southwest of Didymoteicho and 21 km west of Uzunköprü (Turkey). The Greek National Road 51/E85 (Alexandroupoli - Orestiada - Svilengrad) and the railway from Alexandroupoli to Didymoteicho pass through the village.

== Historical population ==
Year	Population
1981	700
1991	643
2001	552
2011	412
2021	317

== History ==
After the Balkan Wars of 1912 and 1913, the area of Western Thrace became part of Bulgaria. As a result of the 1919 Treaty of Neuilly, it became a part of Greece. Amorio suffered damage from floods in 2005.

== See also ==
- List of settlements in the Evros regional unit
