= Adrianople vilayet =

First-level administrative division of the Ottoman Empire

Vilayet of Adrianople ولايت ادرنه Vilâyet-i Edirne
- Vilayet of the Ottoman Empire
- 1867–1922
- Flag

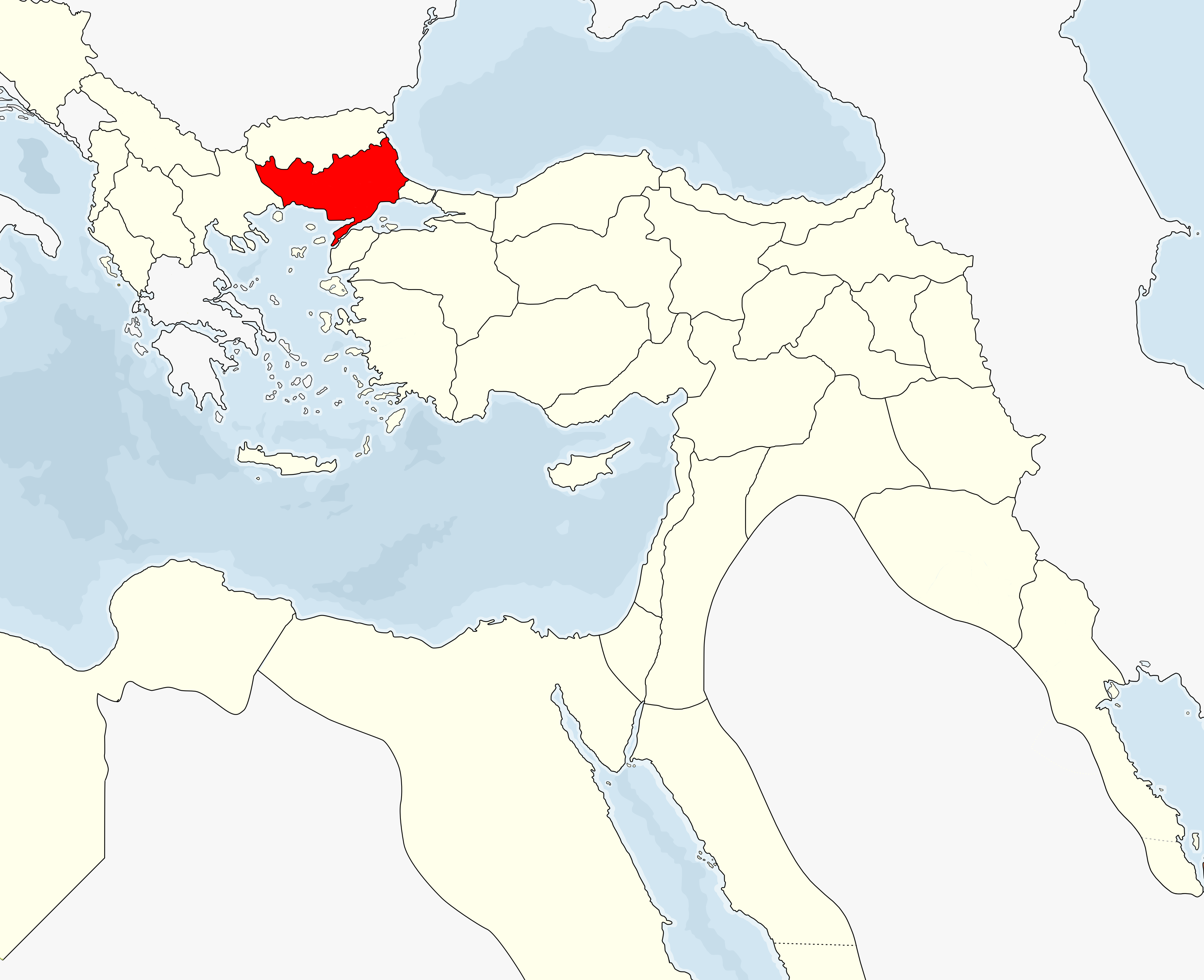
- The Adrianople Vilayet in 1900
- Capital: Adrianople (now Edirne)
- Area
  - Coordinates: 41.16°N 26.32°E
- Population
  - Muslim, 1914: 360,411
  - Greek, 1914: 224,680
  - Armenian, 1914: 19,773
  - Jewish, 1914: 22,515
- History
  - Vilayet Law: 1867
  - Disestablished: 1922
Preceded by
Edirne Eyalet
Succeeded by
Kingdom of Greece
Turkey
Tsardom of Bulgaria
- Today part of: Turkey; Greece; Bulgaria

The Vilayet of Adrianople or Vilayet of Edirne (Ottoman Turkish: ولايت ادرنه; Vilâyet-i Edirne) was a first-level administrative division (vilayet) of the Ottoman Empire.

Prior to 1878, the vilayet had an area of 26,160 square miles (67,800 km^{2}) and extended all the way to the Balkan Mountains. However, by virtue of the Treaty of Berlin (1878), the Sanjak of İslimye, most of the Sanjak of Filibe and a small part of the Sanjak of Edirne (the Kızılağaç kaza and Monastır nahiya) were carved out of it to create the autonomous province of Eastern Rumelia, with a total area of 32,978 km^{2}. The province unified peacefully with the Principality of Bulgaria in 1885.

The rest of the vilayet was split between Turkey and Greece in 1923, culminating in the formation of Western and Eastern Thrace after World War I as part of the Treaty of Lausanne. A smaller portion had already gone to Bulgaria by virtue of the Treaty of Bucharest (1913) following the Balkan Wars. In the late 19th century, it bordered on the Istanbul Vilayet, the Black Sea and the Sea of Marmara in the east, on the Salonica Vilayet in the west, on Eastern Rumelia (Bulgarian since 1885) in the north and on the Aegean Sea in the south. Sometimes the area is also described as Southern Thrace, or Adrianopolitan Thrace.

After the city of Adrianople (Edirne in Turkish; pop. in 1905 about 80,000), the principal towns were Rodosto (now Tekirdağ) (35,000), Gelibolu (25,000), Kırklareli (16,000), İskeçe (14,000), Çorlu (11,500), Dimetoka (10,000), Enez (8000), Gümülcine (8000) and Dedeağaç (3000).

== Administrative divisions ==
Sanjaks of the Vilayet:

1. Sanjak of Adrianople (now Edirne) (Adrianople, Cisr-i Mustafapaşa, Kırcaali, Dimetoka, Ortaköy, Cisr-i Ergene, Havsa. It had also kazas of Kırkkilise, Baba-yı Atik, Beykar Hisar, Maa Hatunili-Kızılağaç (Its centre was Kızılağaç) and Ferecik. Kızılağaç went to Yanbolu sanjak of Şarki Rumeli Vilayeti, Ferecik went initially to Gelibolu in 1876, later to Dedeağaç and was demoted to nahiya in 1878, Kırkkilise, Baba-yı Atik and Beykar Hisar went to recreated Kırkkilise sanjak in 1878. Beykar Hisar was demoted to nahiya in 1879)
2. Sanjak of Kirklareli (Since 1878) (Kirkkilise) (Kırkkilise, Tırnovacık, Lüleburgaz, Vize, Ahtabolu, Midye, Baba-yı Atik. Most of Tırnovacık and Ahtabolu were ceded to Bulgaria in 1913. Saray separated from Vize and became kaza in 1916)
3. Sanjak of Rodosto (now Tekirdağ) (Tekfurdagi) (Tekfurdağı, Çorlu, Malkara, Hayrabolu. It had also kazas Vize, Lüleburgaz and Midye till 1879, it was gone to recreated Kırkkilise sanjak)
4. Sanjak of Gelibolu (Gelibolu, Maydos, Şarköy, Mürefte, Keşan. It had also Enez and Gümülcine kazas till 1878. Gümülcine promoted to sanjak in 1878. Enez went to Dedeağaç sanjak. Finally İpsala (promoted to kaza) and Enez returned to Gelibolu in 1913)
5. Sanjak of Dedeağaç (1878-1912) (Dedeağaç, Sofulu, Enez)
6. Sanjak of Gümülcine (1878-1912) (Gümülcine, İskeçe, Koşukavak, Ahiçelebi, Eğridere, Darıdere). The whole Sanjak was ceded to Bulgaria, with a small part to Greece in 1913.
7. Sanjak of Filibe (Filibe, Pazarcık, Hasköy, Zağra-i Atik, Kızanlık, Çırpan, Sultanyeri, Ahiçelebi) (until 1878, then it became part of Eastern Rumelia, except for Sultanyeri and Ahiçelebi, which were seded back to the Ottoman Empire and eventually incorporated into the Sanjak of Gümülcine)
8. Sanjak of Slimia (İslimye, Yanbolu, Misivri, Karinabat, Aydos, Zağra-i Cedid, Ahyolu, Burgaz) (until 1878, then became part of Eastern Rumelia)

== Demographics ==
Ethnoconfessional groups in the Adrianople Vilayet as per the 1875 Vilayet Census
1. Bulgarians and Greeks (58.8%)
2. Muslims (35.0%)
3. Muslim Romani (2.84%)
4. Jews (1.03%)
5. Armenians (1.02%)
6. Roman Catholics (0.76%)
7. Christian Romani (0.58%)

Total population of the Adrianople Vilayet by ethnoconfessional groups according to French orientalist Ubicini on the basis of the official Ottoman Census of the Vilayet in 1875:

Ethnoconfessional Groups in the Adrianople Vilayet as per the 1875 Vilayet Census
Population	Number	Percentage
Muslims	603,110	37.83%
—Muslims	557,692	34.98%
—Muslim Romani	45,418	2.84%
Christians	974,644	61.14%
—Bulgar millet & Rum millet	937,054	58.78%
—Ermeni millet	16,194	1.02%
—Roman Catholics	12,144	0.76%
—Christian Romani	9,252	0.58%
Yahudi millet	16,432	1.03%
GRAND TOTAL	1,594,186	100%

Total population of the Adrianople Vilayet (including Eastern Rumelia) in 1878 according to the Turkish author Kemal Karpat:

Group	POPULATION
Bulgarians	40% (526,691)
Other Christians	22% (283,603)
Muslims	39% (503,058)
TOTAL Adrianople Vilayet	100% (1,304,352)

Population of various ethnoconfessonal communities in the Vilayet and its sanjaks according to the 1906/7 Ottoman census, in thousands, adjusted to round numbers. The communities are counted according to the Millet System of the Ottoman Empire rather than by the mother tongue. Thus, some Bulgarian-speakers were included in the Greek Rum millet and counted as Greeks, while the Muslim millet included Turks and Pomaks (Bulgarian speaking Muslims).

Ethnoconfessional groups in the Adrianople Vilayet as per the 1906-07 Ottoman Census
1. Muslims (52.6%)
2. Greeks (29.0%)
3. Bulgarians (13.8%)
4. Armenians (2.21%)
5. Jews (2.04%)
6. Miscellaneous (0.37%)

Groups	Edirne	Gümülcine	Kırklareli	Dedeağac	Tekirdağ	Gelibolu	Total
Muslims	154	240	78	44	77	26	619
Greeks	103	22	71	28	53	65	341
Bulgarians	57	29	30	29	6	1	162
Jews	16	1	2	–	3	2	24
Armenians	5	–	-	–	19	1	26
Others	2	-	–	-	1	-	2
Total	317	292	181	89	159	96	1,176

A publication from December 21, 1912, in the Belgian magazine Ons Volk Ontwaakt (Our Nation Awakes) estimated 1,006,500 inhabitants:

- Muslim Turks – 250,000
- Muslim Bulgarians – 115,000
- Muslim Roma people – 15,000
- Orthodox Armenians – 30,000
- Orthodox Greeks – 220,000
- Orthodox Bulgarians – 370,000
- Orthodox Albanians – 3,500
- Orthodox Turks – 3,000

=== Sanjak of Filibe ===
Male population of the Filibe Sanjak of the Adrianople Vilayet in 1876 according to the British R. J. Moore:

Ethnoconfessional groups in the Sanjak of Filibe in 1876
1. Bulgarians (57.6%)
2. Turks (36.6%)
3. Muslim Romani (3.58%)
4. Greeks (1.15%)
5. Jews (0.59%)
6. Christian Romani (0.40%)
7. Armenians (0.14%)

	Turks	Muslim Gypsies	Christian Gypsies	Bulgarians	Greeks	Armenians	Jews	KAZA TOTAL
Filibe kaza	28% (35,400)	4% (5,474)	0% (495)	63% (80,107)	3% (3,700)	0% (380)	1% (691)	100% (126,247)
Tatar Pazardzhik kaza	23% (10,805)	4% (2,120)	1% (579)	70% (33,395)	1% (300)	0% (94)	1% (344)	100% (47,637)
Hasköy kaza	55% (33,323)	3% (1,548)	0% (145)	42% (25,503)	0% (0)	0% (3)	0% (65)	100% (60,587)
Zagora kaza	20% (6,677)	3% (989)	0% (70)	75% (24,857)	0% (0)	0% (0)	2% (740)	100% (33,333)
Kazanlak kaza	46% (14,365)	4% (1,384)	0% (24)	48% (14,906)	0% (0)	0% (0)	1% (219)	100% (30,898)
Chirpan kaza	24% (5,157)	2% (420)	0% (88)	74% (15,959)	0% (0)	0% (0)	0% (0)	100% (21,624)
Sultan-Jeri kaza	97% (13,336)	1% (159)	0% (0)	2% (262)	0% (0)	0% (0)	0% (0)	100% (13,757)
Akcselebi kaza	59% (8,197)	3% (377)	0% (0)	38% (5,346)	0% (0)	0% (0)	0% (0)	100% (13,920)
TOTAL Filibe Sanjak	37% (127,260)	4% (12,471)	0% (1,401)	58% (200,335)	1% (4,000)	0% (477)	1% (2,059)	100% (348,000)

=== Sanjak of İslimiye ===
Male population of İslimiye sanjak of Adrianople Vilayet in 1873 according to Ottoman almanacs:

Community	Population
Muslims	37,200 (47%)
Non-Muslims	46,961 (53%)
TOTAL Islimiye sanjak	100% (84,161)

Male population of İslimiye sanjak of Adrianople Vilayet in 1875 according to British R.J. Moore:

Community	Population
Muslims	42% (44,747)
Non-Muslims	58% (60,854)
TOTAL Islimiye sanjak	100% (105,601)

=== Sanjak of Gümülcine ===
Total population of the Sanjak of Gümülcine of the Adrianople Vilayet In the 19th century:

Sanjak	Muslims	Christian Bulgarians	Christian Greeks
Gümülcine	206.914	20.671	15.241

== Gallery ==
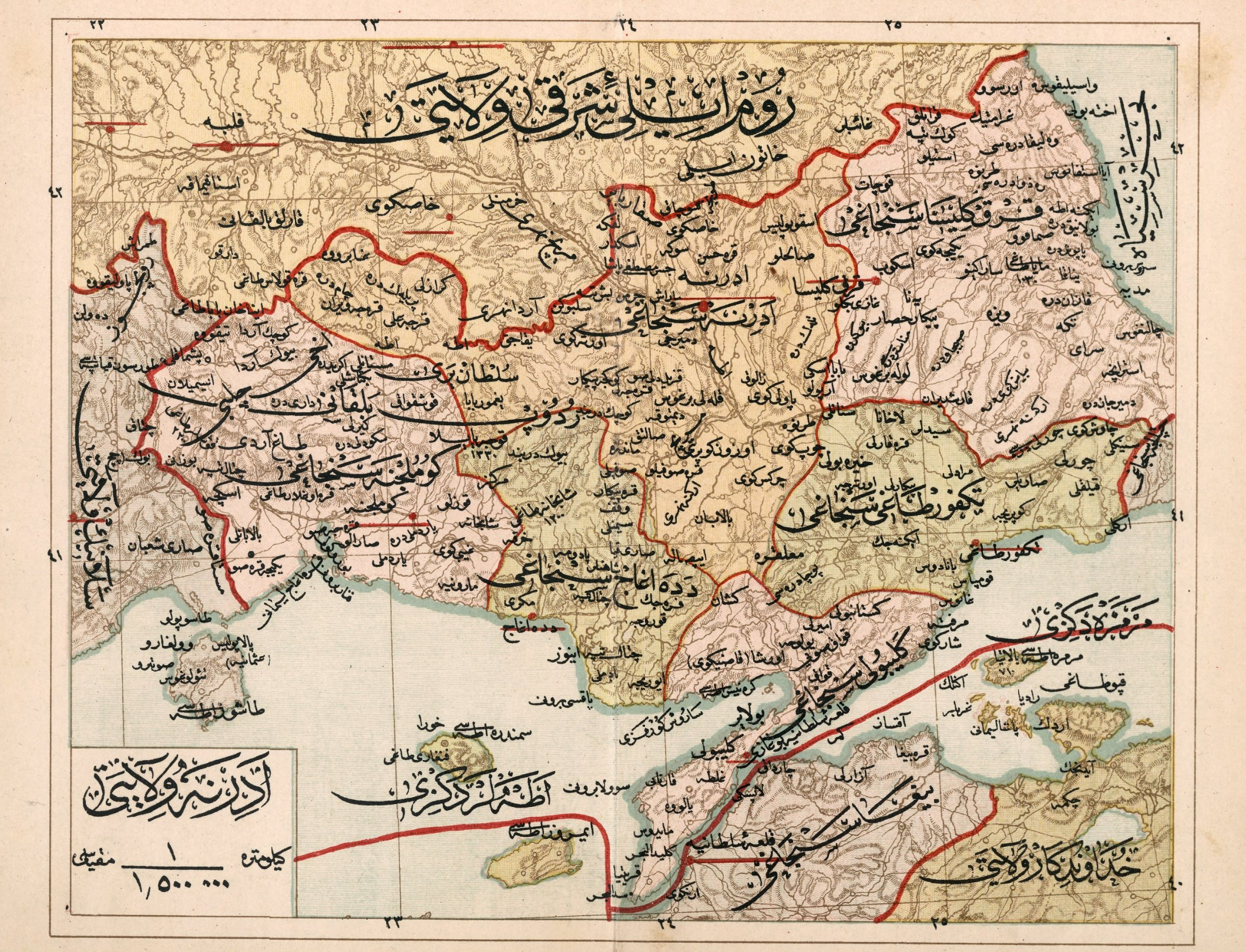
1907 Ottoman Turkish map of the vilayet

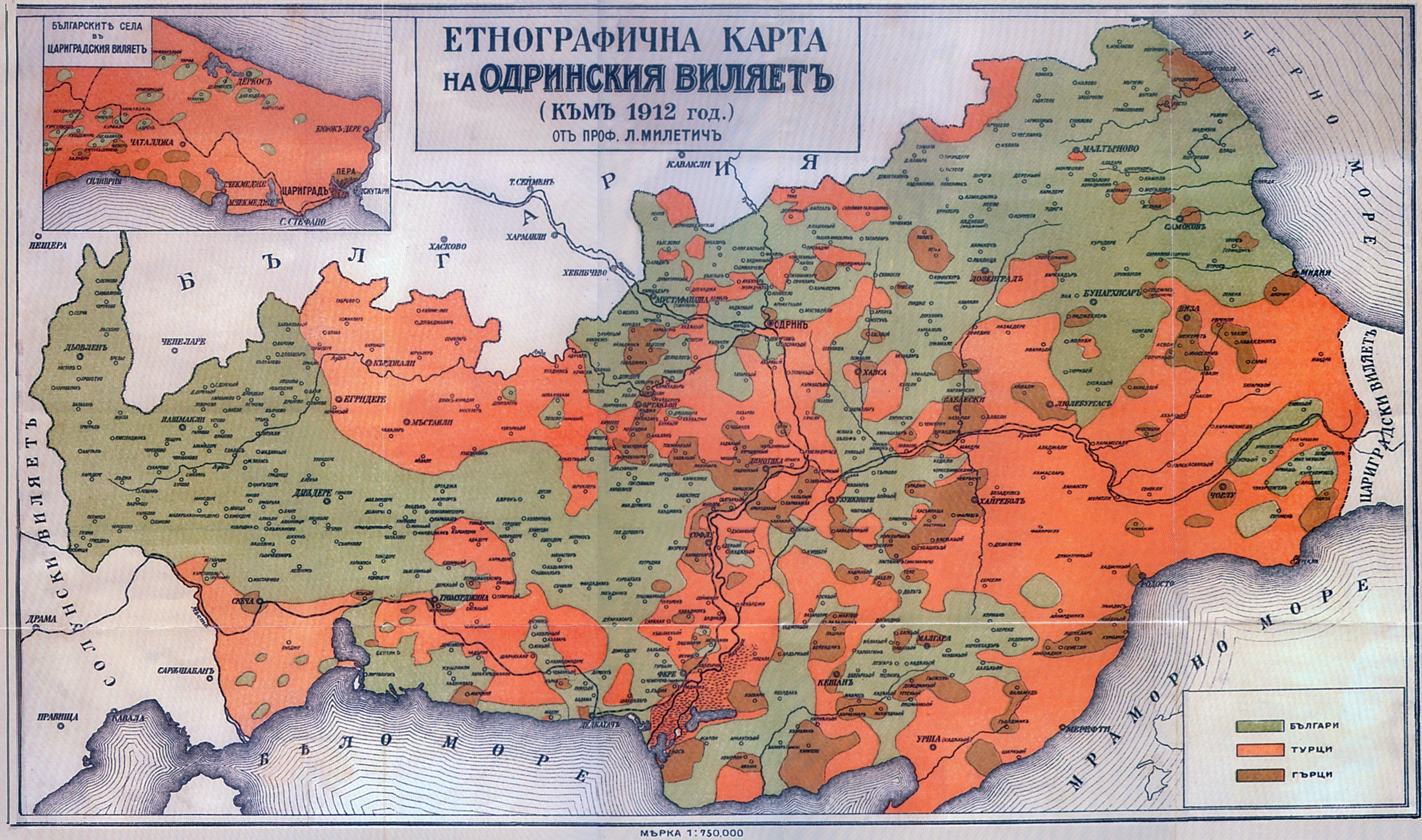
Ethnic map of 1912 according to Bulgarian ethnographers
