= Pano Angelov =

Bulgarian revolutionary

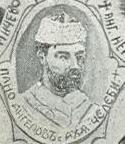
- Born: 2 February 1879; Bashklise, Ottoman Empire, today Greece
- Died: 16 March 1903 (aged 24); Sarmashik, today Bulgaria
- Organization: IMARO

Pano Angelov Apostolov (Bulgarian: Пано Ангелов Апостолов), known also as Karabadzhakov (Bulgarian: Карабаджаков), was a Bulgarian revolutionary, a worker of the Internal Macedonian-Adrianople Revolutionary Organization (IMARO).

== Life ==
Pano Angelov was born in 1879 in the village of Bashklise, in the Ottoman Empire. Pano Angelov Apostolov comes Karite family, who were emigrants from the region of Chirpan and founders of Bashkyoy (Bashklise). His grandfather Angel was a famous wrestler. His son Apostol, who was a member of the revolutionary band of Angel voyvoda, died near Soflu.

After the liberation of Bulgaria, Pano Angelov and his family moved to the village of Brod, Haskovo region. After he finished the elementary school in Brod, he studied in the Pedagogic school in Kazanlak.

In 1902, when Pano Angelov stopped to teach, he went to Burgas where he met Mihail Gerdzhikov, Lazar Madzharov, Georgi Kondolov, Levter Mechev, Nikola Ravashola, Kiro Uzunov and other members of the Internal Macedonian-Adrianople Revolutionary Organization (IMARO). He was chosen a leader of regions of Sarmashik, Zvezdets, Stoilovo, Kalovo and Byala Voda. He toured the villages of Strandzha, formed groups for executions, made conspiracies, collected finances and supplied the organization with weapons. He showed remarkable organizational qualities, courage, coolness, honour and manners, because of which his revolutionary band earned the confidence of the population. All villages of his region of supervision founded groups for executions, organized a network of couriers, supplied weapons and ammunition and provided new freedom fighters to join the bands.

On 28 March 1903 the revolutionary band of Pano Angelov, together with its members Nikola Ravashola, Georgi Mutafov, Atanas Valkanov and Petko Puhov, was in the village of Sarmashik (today known as Brashlyan), where the band was betrayed. Pano Angelov and Nikola Ravashola were killed in the battle that had begun. Their death and heroism was glorified in the song "Yasen mesets", that is known as the Marseillaise of Strandzha.

In 1997, on the occasion of the centenary of the foundation of the organization in Thrace and 94-year anniversary of the heroism in Sarmashik, a remembrance plaque was erected in Dimanova polyana (Brashlyansko zemlishte), where Pano Angelov was killed.
