= Erythropotamos =

Erythropotamos (Ερυθροπόταμος) Luda reka (Луда река)
- Native name: Erythropotamos (Greek); Ερυθροπόταμος (Greek); Luda reka (Bulgarian); Луда река (Bulgarian)

Location
- Countries: Bulgaria and Greece

Physical characteristics
- Source
  - location: Eastern Rhodope Mountains
- Mouth
  - location: Maritsa/Evros
  - coordinates: 41°19′41″N 26°30′33″E
- Length: approx. 100 km (62 mi)
- Basin size: 1,618.5 km²

Basin features
- Progression: Maritsa→ Aegean Sea

The Erythropotamos (Greek: Ερυθροπόταμος, meaning "red river") or Luda reka (Bulgarian: Луда река, meaning "mad river") is a river in southern Bulgaria (Haskovo Province) and northeastern Greece (Evros regional unit). Its Turkish name was Kızıldelisu. Its source is near Mega Dereio. It flows into the Maritsa (Evros) near Didymoteicho.

== Geography ==
The source of the river is in the eastern Rhodope Mountains in the western Evros regional unit, Greece, near the village Mikro Dereio. It crosses the border with Bulgaria near Gorno Lukovo in the Ivaylovgrad municipality, and forms the Greek-Bulgarian border for several kilometers. It crosses back into Greece between the villages Siv Kladenets and Alepochori. It passes the villages Metaxades, Ladi, Mani and Koufovouno before flowing into the Evros just beyond Didymoteicho.

Its largest tributary is the Byala reka ("white river") in Bulgaria, which flows into the Luda reka near the village Odrintsi.

== Hydrology ==
The Erythropotamos River basin covers an area of approximately 1,618.5 km^{2}, with most of it in Greece's Thrace region and a smaller part in Bulgaria. The region's geological formations include orthogneisses, augen gneisses, pegmatites, marbles, amphibolites, and sediments. Elevations range from 16 meters to 1,258 meters above mean sea level, with a predominantly hilly terrain.

== Flood Events and Susceptibility ==
The Erythropotamos River is prone to frequent flooding, particularly in its lower reaches. Significant flood events have occurred in 2010, 2017, and 2018, causing considerable damage. Flood susceptibility mapping has been carried out using GIS and remote sensing technologies, identifying high-risk zones and validating them with SAR imagery. Approximately 60% of recent flood areas intersect with high susceptibility zones on these maps.

== Invasive Species ==
The Erythropotamos River has been affected by the introduction of invasive species, such as the Asian clam (Corbicula fluminea). This species was first recorded in Greece within the Erythropotamos River, likely spreading downstream from Bulgaria. The presence of this species poses ecological risks and challenges for river basin management.
