= Strandzha (organization) =

Bulgarian revolutionary organizatioin

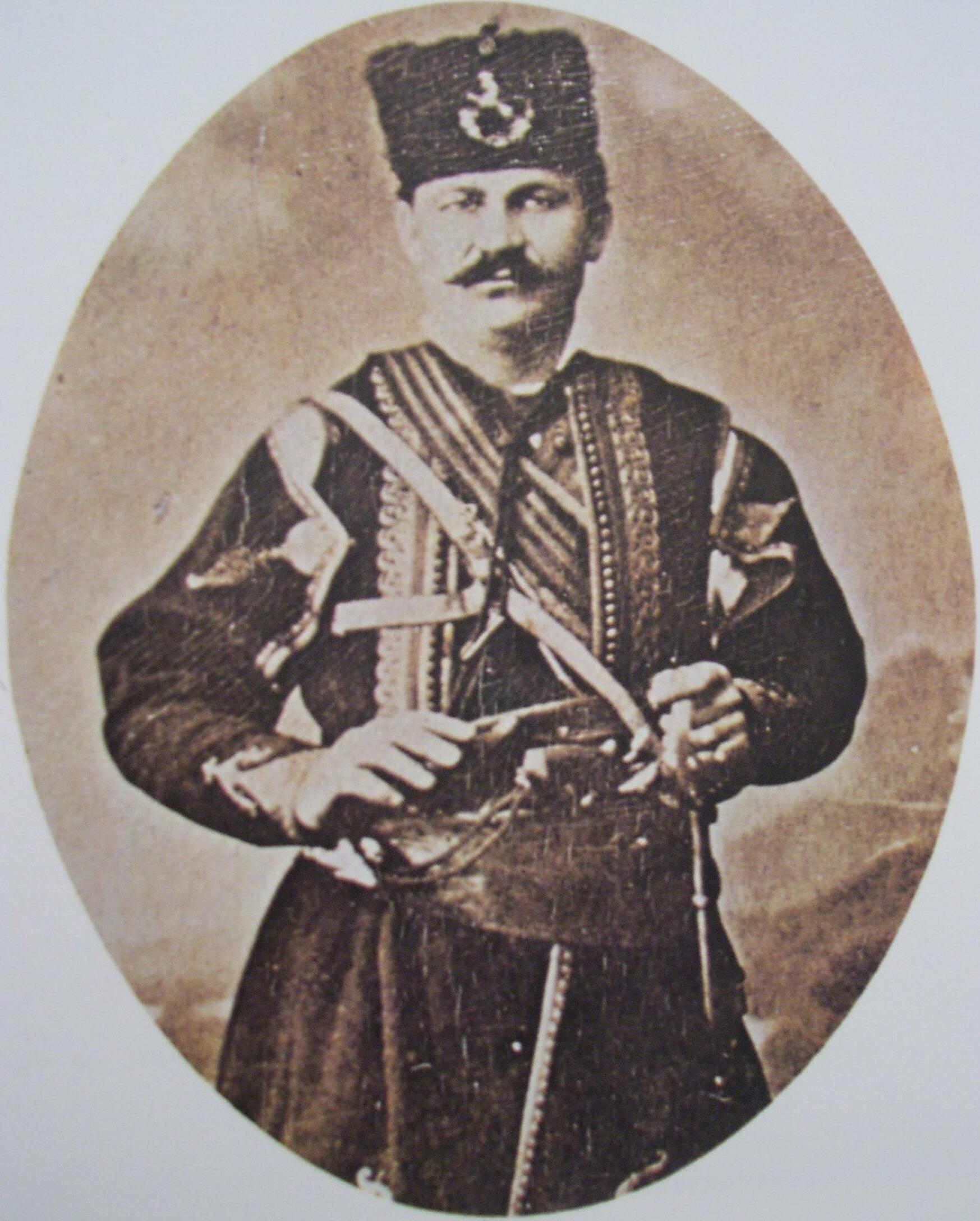
Petko Voyvoda, the founder of Strandzha.

"Strandzha" was a revolutionary organization of immigrants from Eastern Thrace to Bulgaria, which existed from 1896 to 1900. It was founded as a legal organization in 1896 in Varna by immigrants led by Petko Kiryakov. Only two months later in December 1896 in Burgas was convened the Congress of the Thracian emigration in the country. Following a first Congress now united company "Strandzha", various initiatives taken place and received public recognition. To perform its task a secret revolutionary committee was founded. This subsidiary body had the task to support the organization and to send armed bands in Thrace. Once, in the next few years it sent several detachments in Strandzha and the Rhodopes. In 1899 the Supreme Macedonian Committee made to "Strandzha" the proposal for unification. This act was realized on the seventh Congress of Supreme Macedonian Committee (30 July-5 August 1900). The combined organization was called the Supreme Macedonian-Adrianople Committee.

== See also ==
- Internal Thracian Revolutionary Organisation
