= Pautalia Glacier =

Glacier in Antarctica

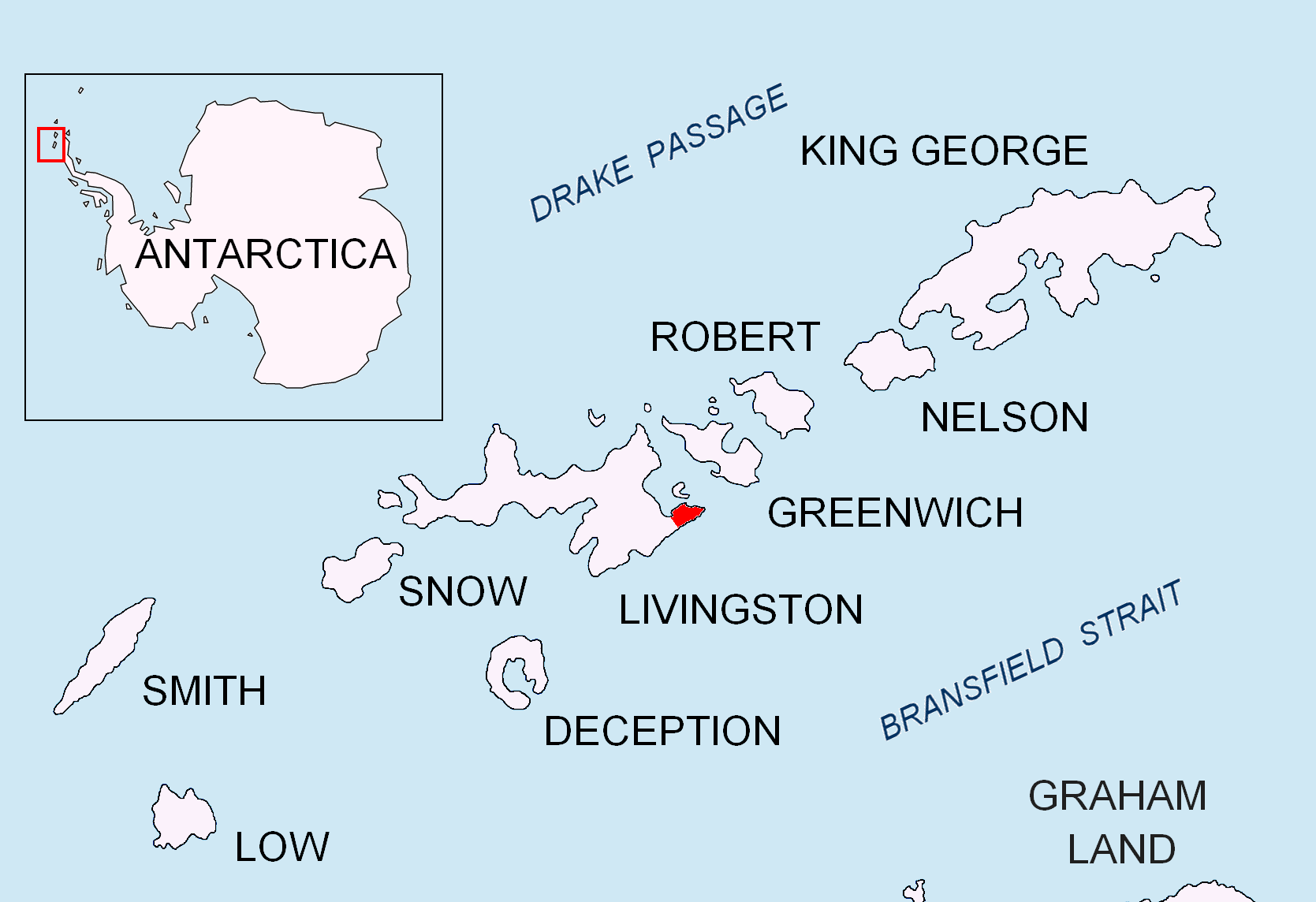
- Location of Burgas Peninsulaon Livingston Island in the South Shetland Islands

- Location within South Shetland Islands Location within Antarctica
- Location: Livingston Island; South Shetland Islands
- Coordinates: 62°37′41″S 59°51′50″W
- Length: 0.6 nautical miles (1.1 km; 0.69 mi)
- Width: 0.4 nautical miles (0.74 km; 0.46 mi)
- Thickness: unknown
- Terminus: Bransfield Strait
- Status: unknown

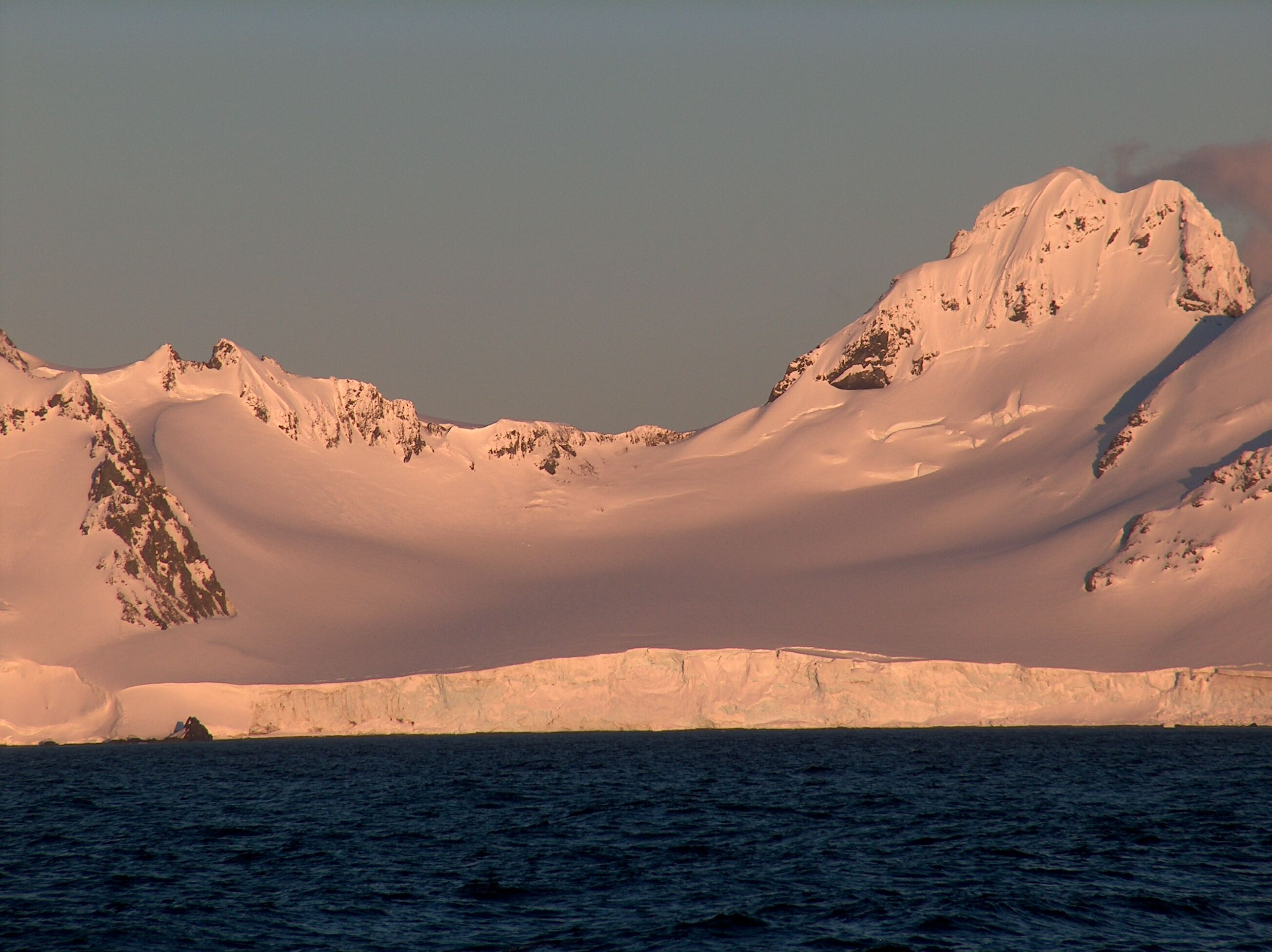
Pautalia Glacier

Topographic map of Livingston Island and Smith Island.

Pautalia Glacier (Bulgarian: ледник Пауталия, romanized: lednik Pautaliya, IPA: [ˈlɛdnik pɐoˈtalijɐ]) is a small glacier on Burgas Peninsula, Livingston Island in the South Shetland Islands, Antarctica situated northeast of Strandzha Glacier and south of Sopot Ice Piedmont. It is bounded by Petko Voyvoda Peak to the west, Sozopol Gap to the northwest, Kaloyan Nunatak to the north and Shabla Knoll to the east. The glacier extends 700 m in northwest-southeast direction and 1.1 km in southwest-northeast direction, and flows southeastward into Bransfield Strait.

The feature is named after the ancient Pautalia, ancestor of the present town of Kyustendil in Western Bulgaria.

== Location ==
Pautalia Glacier is centred at 62°37′41″S 59°51′50″W. Bulgarian mapping in 2005 and 2009.

== See also ==
- List of glaciers in the Antarctic
- Glaciology

== Maps ==
- L.L. Ivanov et al. Antarctica: Livingston Island and Greenwich Island, South Shetland Islands. Scale 1:100000 topographic map. Sofia: Antarctic Place-names Commission of Bulgaria, 2005.
- L.L. Ivanov. Antarctica: Livingston Island and Greenwich, Robert, Snow and Smith Islands. Scale 1:120000 topographic map. Troyan: Manfred Wörner Foundation, 2009.
