= Protokklisi =

Protokklisi Πρωτοκκλήσι
- Community
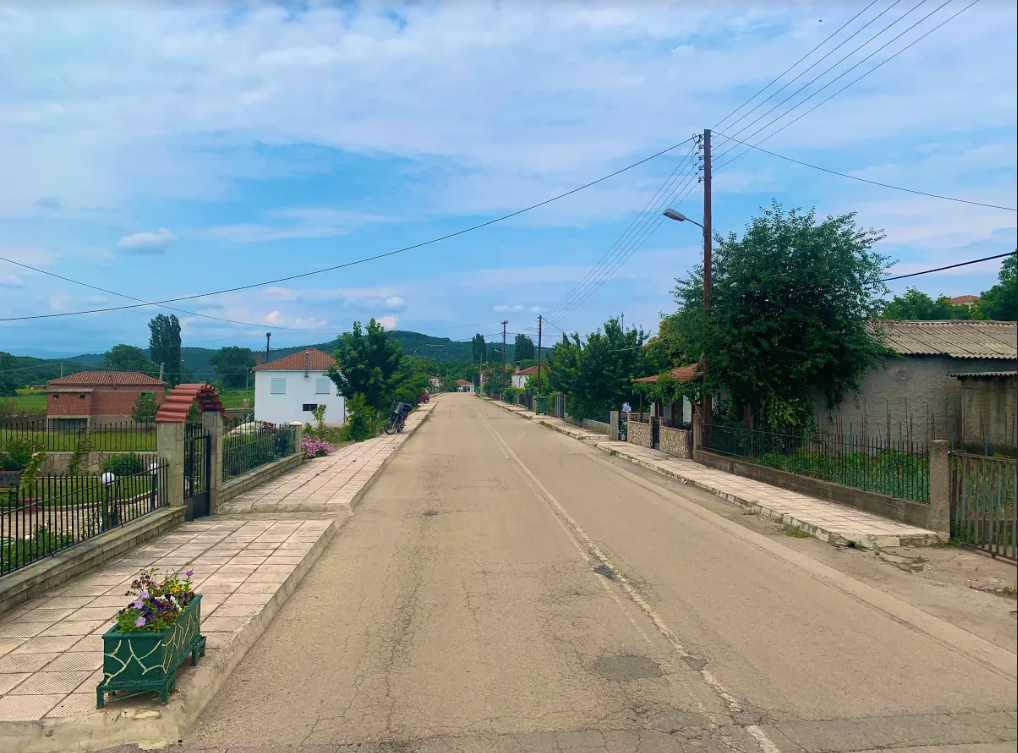
- Main street of Protokklisi

- Location within Greece
- Coordinates: 41°18′N 26°15′E
- Country: Greece
- Administrative region: East Macedonia and Thrace
- Regional unit: Evros
- Municipality: Soufli
- Municipal unit: Orfeas

Population (2021)
  - Community: 776
- Time zone: UTC+2 (EET)
  - Summer (DST): UTC+3 (EEST)

Protokklisi (Greek: Πρωτοκκλήσι meaning the first church, Bulgarian: Башклисе) is a village and a community in the central part of the Evros regional unit in Greece. Protoklissi is in the municipal unit of Orfeas. In 2021 its population was 776 for the community, including the village Agriani. Protokklisi is located about 15 km northwest of Soufli, in the valley of a right tributary of the river Evros.

== Population ==
Year	Village population	Community population
1981	-	1,230
1991	672	-
2001	669	1,120
2011	260	790
2021	306	776

== History ==
The village was founded in the second half of 18th century by Bulgarian settlers from Chirpan. The name of the village during the Ottoman rule was Bashklise (Başkilise in Turkish, Башклисе Bašklise in Bulgarian). In 1830, it had 100 Bulgarian families, in 1878 and 1912 the village had 105 Bulgarian families. According to professor Lyubomir Miletich, the 1912 population contained 100 Bulgarian families.

After a brief period of Bulgarian rule between 1913 and 1919, it became part of Greece. As a result its Bulgarian population was exchanged with Greek refugees, mainly from today's Turkey.

== People ==
- Pano Angelov (Пано Ангелов, 1879–1903), Bulgarian revolutionary leader

== See also ==
- List of settlements in the Evros regional unit
