= Lavara =

Lavara Λάβαρα
- Community
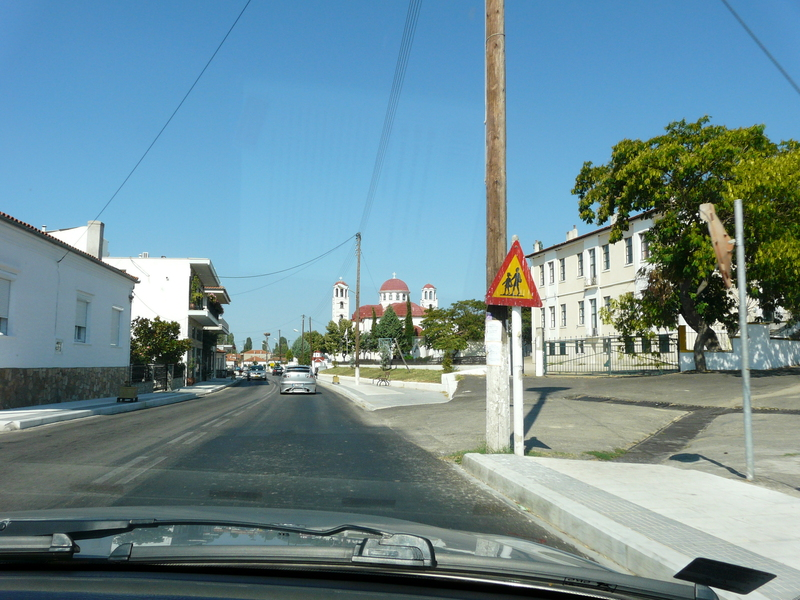

- Location within Greece
- Coordinates: 41°16′N 26°23′E
- Country: Greece
- Administrative region: East Macedonia and Thrace
- Regional unit: Evros
- Municipality: Soufli
- Municipal unit: Orfeas

Population (2021)
  - Community: 747
- Time zone: UTC+2 (EET)
  - Summer (DST): UTC+3 (EEST)

Flag of rebels of Lavara during the Greek War of Independence

Lavara (Greek: Λάβαρα) is a town located in the eastern part of Evros regional unit. In 1821, Lavara participated in the Greek War of Independence and rose up against the Ottoman Empire. It was the seat of the municipality of Orfeas (Greek: Ορφέας). It is located 2 km from Turkey and the western bank of the river Evros.

== Historical population ==
Year	Population
1981	2,117
1991	2,173
2001	1,580
2011	1,093
2021	747
