= Mikro Dereio =

Mikro Dereio Μικρό Δέρειο
- Community
- Location within Greece
- Coordinates: 41°19′N 26°06′E
- Country: Greece
- Administrative region: East Macedonia and Thrace
- Regional unit: Evros
- Municipality: Soufli
- Municipal unit: Orfeas

Population (2021)
  - Community: 1,836
- Time zone: UTC+2 (EET)
  - Summer (DST): UTC+3 (EEST)

Mikro Dereio (Greek: Μικρό Δέρειο) is a village and a community in the central part of the Evros regional unit in Greece. It is situated on the left bank of the river Erythropotamos, in the Eastern Rhodope Mountains. The border with Bulgaria is 5 km to the north. Mikro Dereio is on the Greek National Road 53. In 2021 its population was 1,836 for the community, which consists of the villages Mikro Dereio, Geriko, Goniko, Mega Dereio, Petrolofos, Roussa and Sidirochori. It is the most populous community of the municipal unit of Orfeas.

== Population ==
Year	Village population	Community population
1878	256	-
1912	220	-
1920	180	-
1981	-	2,067
1991	296	-
2001	252	2,103
2011	158	1,903
2021	91	1,836

== History ==
The village was founded by the Ottoman Turks in the 14th century, it was known as Malak Dervent (Малък Дервент) in Bulgarian. According to Anastas Razbojnikov, its 1830 population was 210 Bulgarian families/houses, 256 in 1878, 220 in 1912 of which 200 were Bulgarian exarchists. According to professor Lyubomir Miletich, the 1912 population was around 200 Bulgarian families. After a brief period of Bulgarian rule between 1913 and 1919, it became part of Greece.

== Person ==
- Angel Popkirov (Ангел Попкиров, 1881-1968), Bulgarian revolutionary leader, member of VMORO

== See also ==
- List of settlements in the Evros regional unit
