= Ladi, Evros =

Ladi Λάδη
- Community
- Location within Greece
- Coordinates: 41°27′05″N 26°15′48″E
- Country: Greece
- Administrative region: East Macedonia and Thrace
- Regional unit: Evros
- Municipality: Didymoteicho
- Municipal unit: Metaxades
- Elevation: 90 m (300 ft)

Population (2021)
  - Community: 91
- Time zone: UTC+2 (EET)
  - Summer (DST): UTC+3 (EEST)
- Postal code: 68010

Ladi is a village in regional unit of Evros in Greece, at an altitude of 90 meters which is located north of the Erythropotamos which ends in the river Evros and east of the border line with Bulgaria.

== Geography ==
It is 25.5 km NW. of Didymoteicho and 35 km W.-SW. of Orestiada. According to the "Kallikratis" Program, it is the local community of Ladi that belongs to the Metaxades municipal unit of the Didymoteicho municipality. According to the 2021 census it has a population of 91 inhabitants.

== History ==
During the period of the Ottoman rule, it was a farmstead of an agha, referred to as "Emblindin" or "Imblindin" and was an intermediate station between Ivaylovgrad and Didymoteicho. The local Greek workers who worked on the farm bought the estates and founded the village Ladi.
