= Petko Voyvoda Peak =

Mountain in the Antarctica

Location of Tangra Mountains on Livingston Island in the South Shetland Islands.

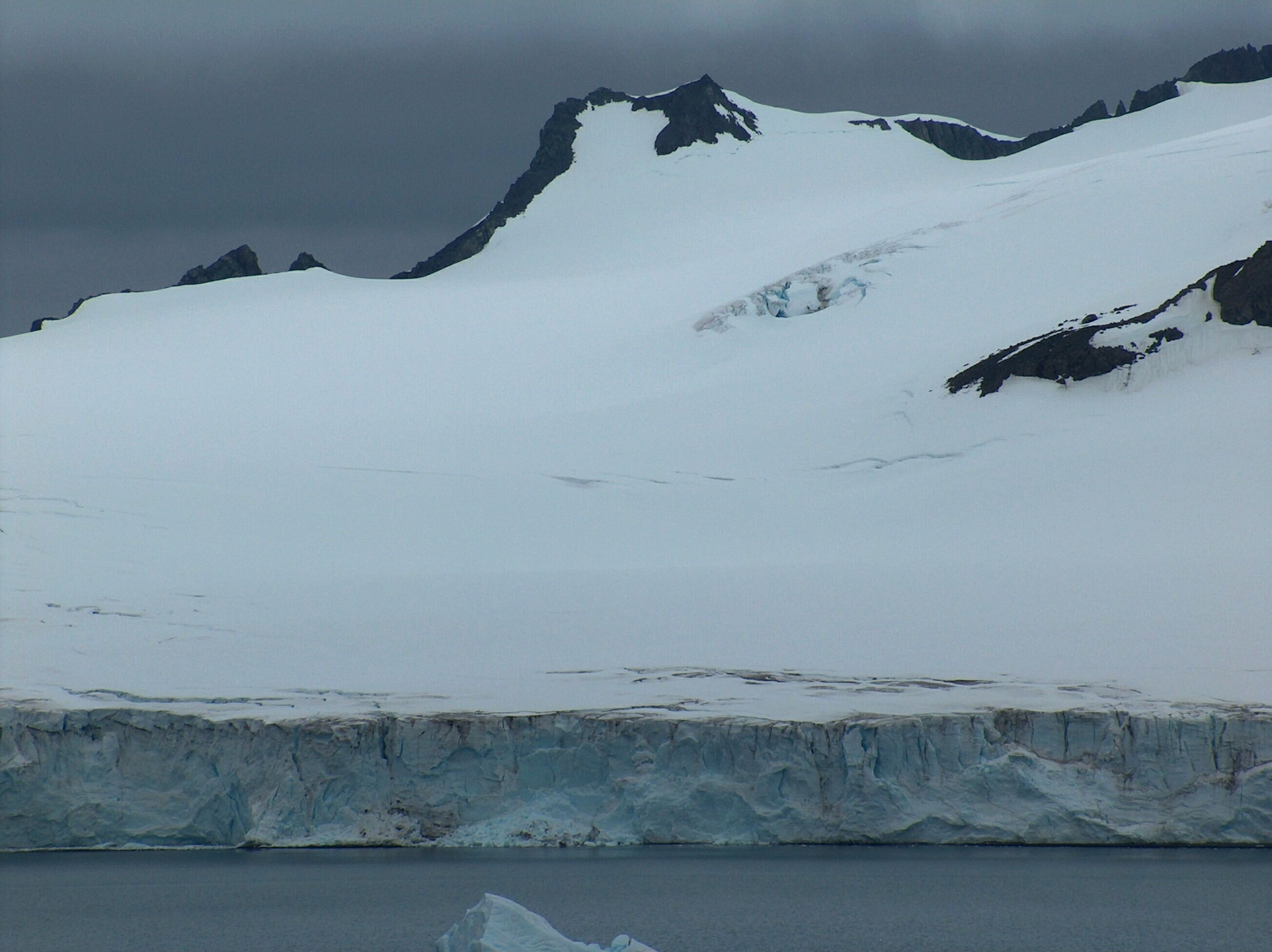
Petko Voyvoda Peak from Half Moon Island, with Sopot Ice Piedmont in the foreground.

Topographic map of Livingston Island and Smith Island.

Petko Voyvoda Peak (Bulgarian: връх Петко Войвода, romanized: vrah Petko Voyvoda, IPA: [ˈvrɤx ˈpɛtko vojˈvɔdɐ]) is a partly ice-covered peak of elevation 400 m in Delchev Ridge in Tangra Mountains, Livingston Island in the South Shetland Islands, Antarctica, which surmounts Sopot Ice Piedmont to the northwest, and Pautalia Glacier to the east.

The peak is named after Captain Petko Voyvoda (pseudonym of Petko Kiryakov, 1844–1900), leader of the Bulgarian liberation movement in Western Thrace and the Rhodope Mountains.

== Location ==
The peak is located at 62°37′49″S 59°52′24″W, which is 1.1 km east of Elena Peak, 1.33 km southeast of Paisiy Peak, 930 m southwest of Kaloyan Nunatak from which the peak is separated by Sozopol Gap, and 1.26 km west-southwest of Shabla Knoll (Bulgarian mapping in 2005 and 2009 from the Tangra 2004/05 survey).

== Maps ==
- L.L. Ivanov et al. Antarctica: Livingston Island and Greenwich Island, South Shetland Islands. Scale 1:100000 topographic map. Sofia: Antarctic Place-names Commission of Bulgaria, 2005.
- L.L. Ivanov. Antarctica: Livingston Island and Greenwich, Robert, Snow and Smith Islands. Scale 1:120000 topographic map. Troyan: Manfred Wörner Foundation, 2009. ISBN 978-954-92032-6-4
