= Petko Voyvoda =

Bulgarian revolutionary (1844–1900)

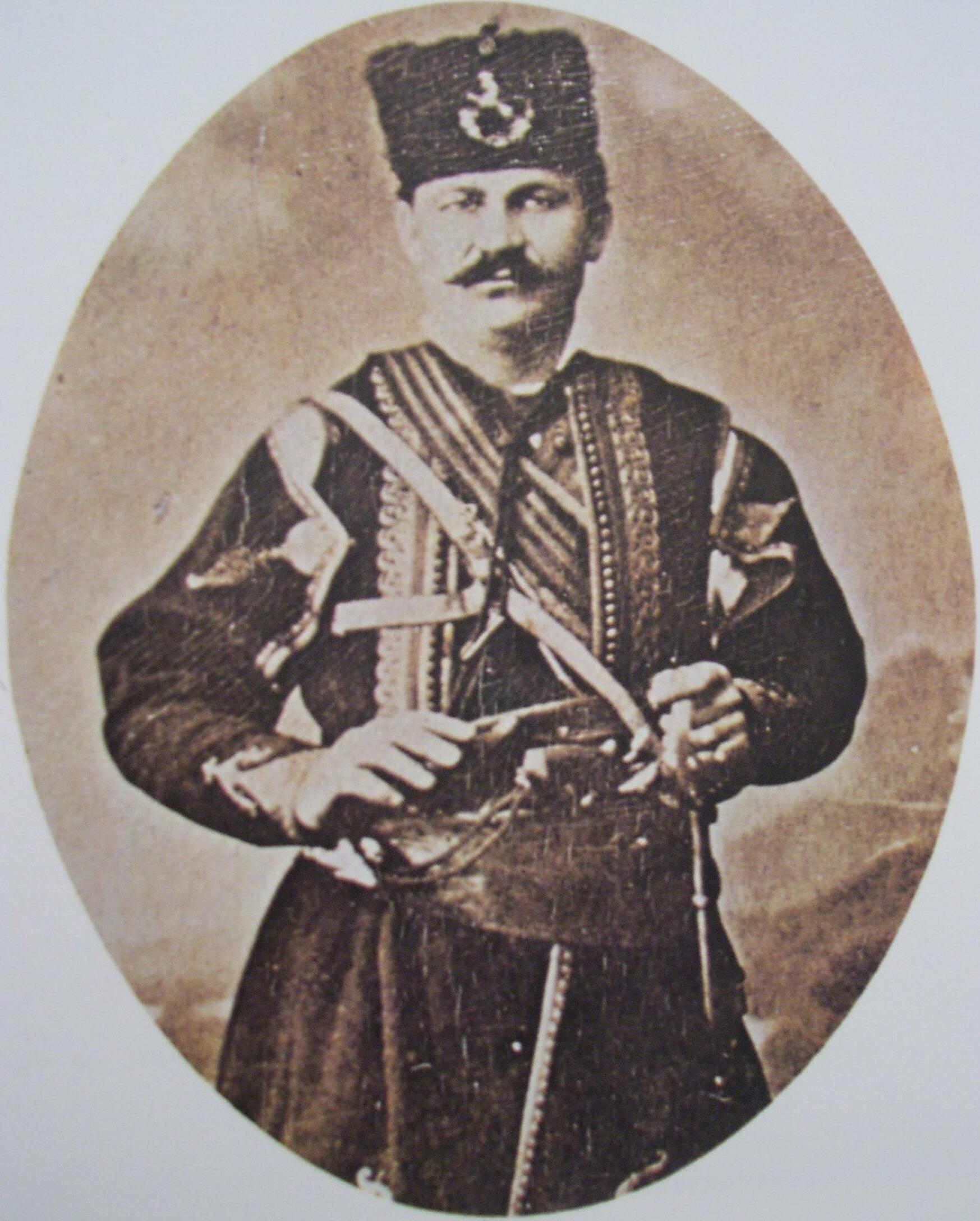
- Portrait of Petko Voyvoda
- Born: 6 December 1844; Doğanhisar, Ottoman Empire (present-day Aisymi, Greece)
- Died: 7 February 1900 (aged 55); Varna, Principality of Bulgaria

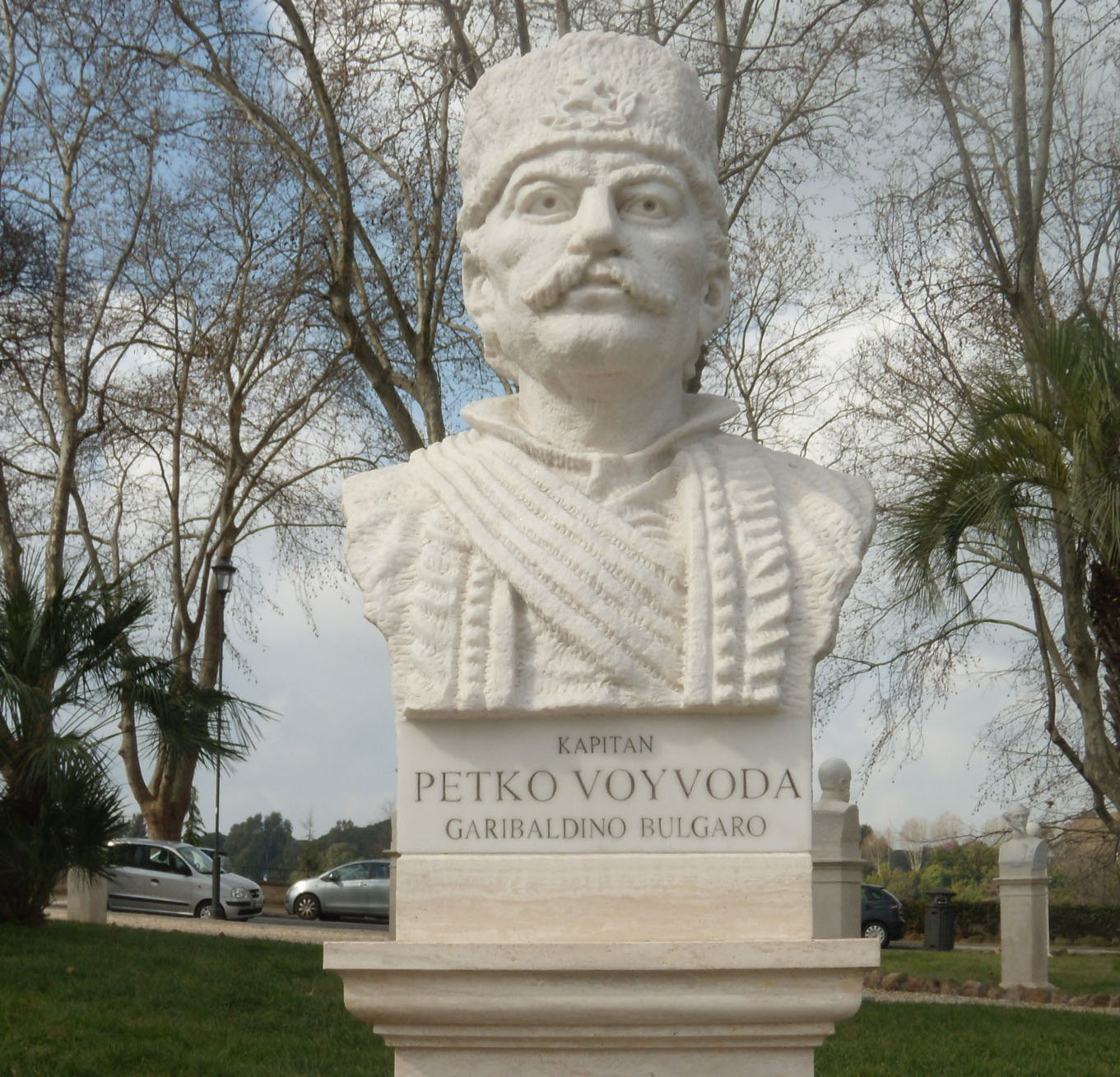
Petko Voyvoda's bust at the Janiculum, Rome, Italy

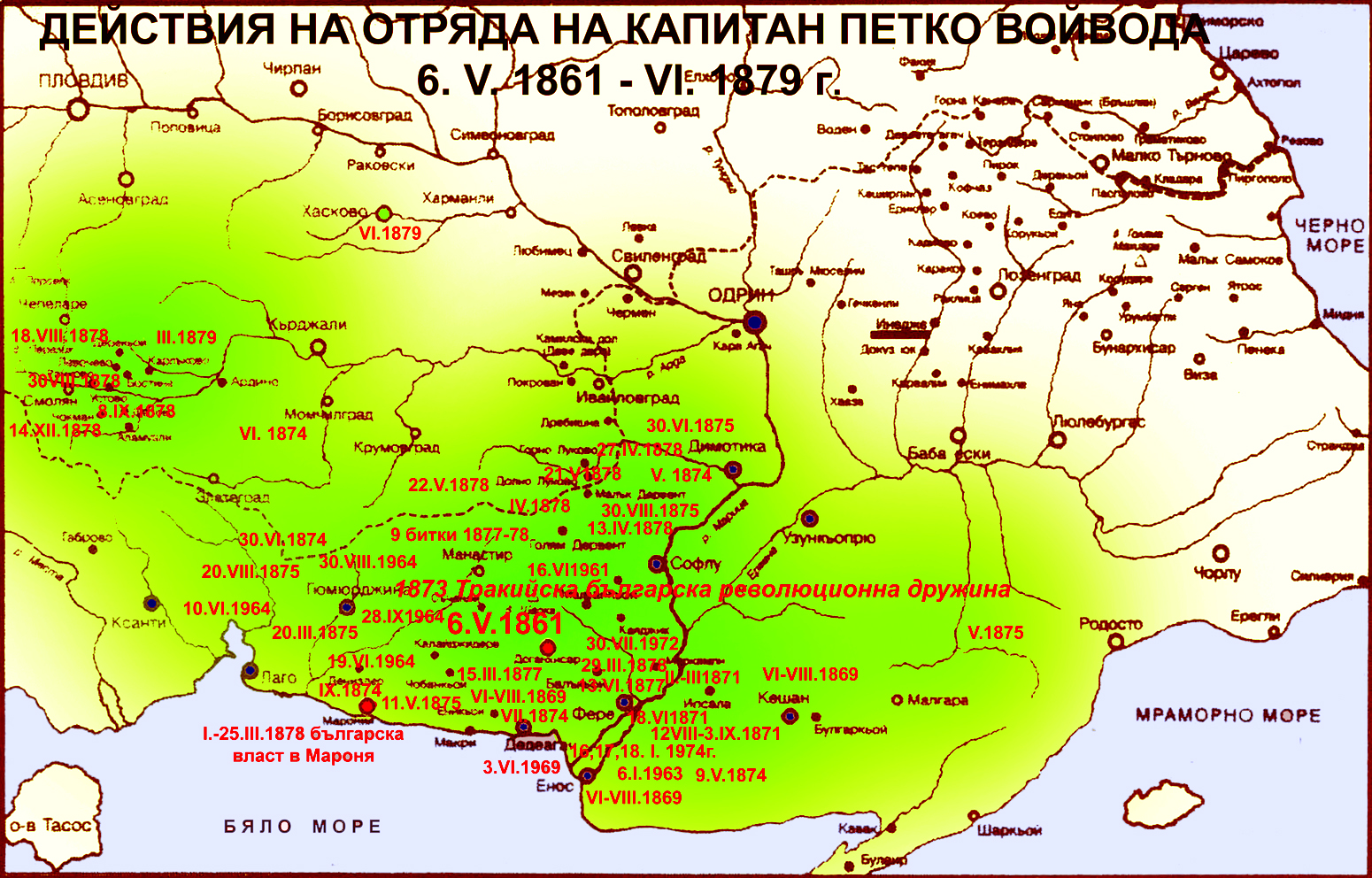
Petko Voyvoda areal of activity in Aegean Thrace

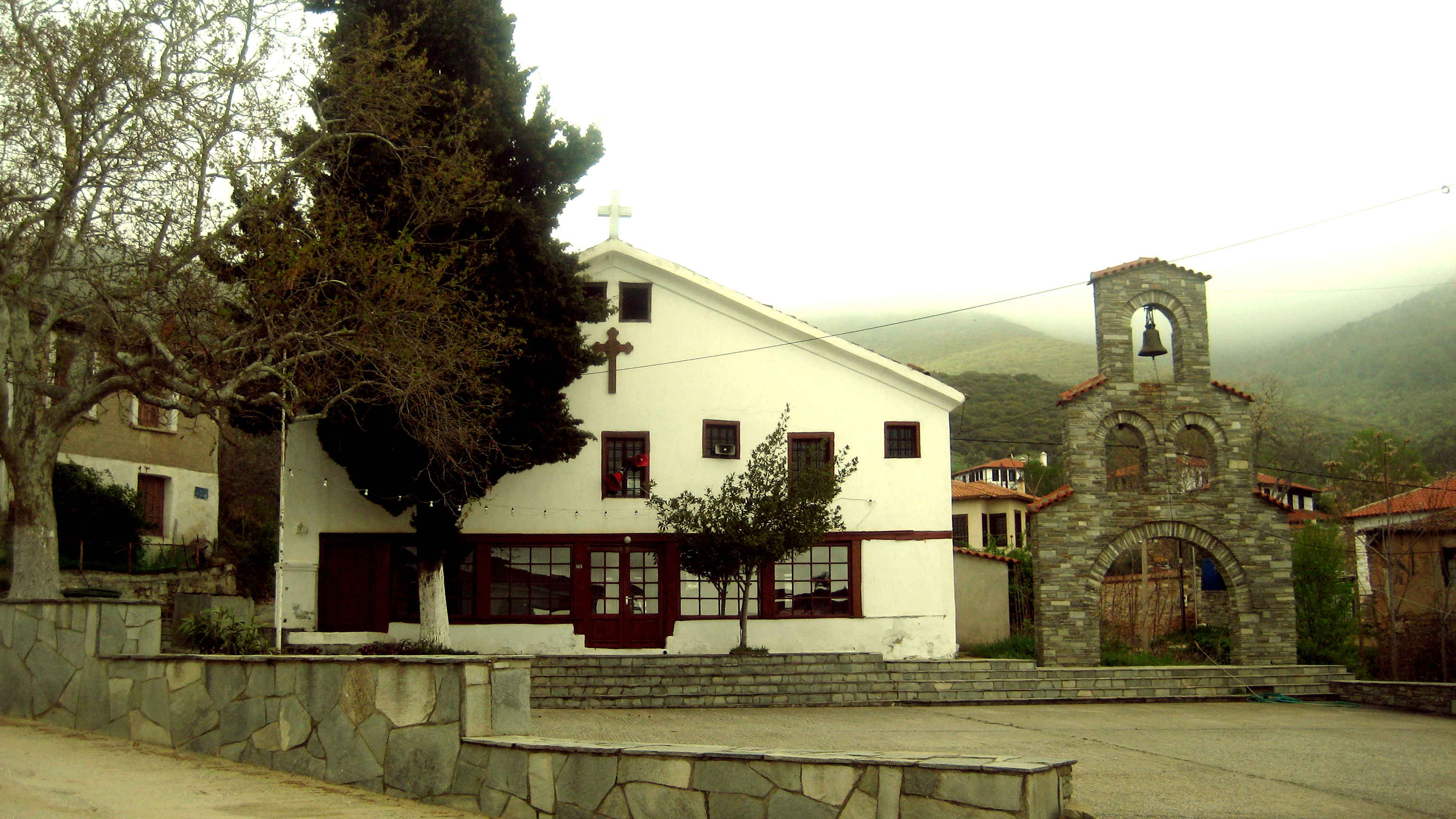
St. Ioan (St. John) church in Maronia where Petko Voyvoda received communion

Petko Kirkov Karakirkov Петко Кирков (Каракирков, Киряков), better known as Captain Petko Voyvoda (Капитан Петко Войвода; 5 December 1844 – 7 February 1900) was a 19th-century Bulgarian hajduk leader and freedom fighter who dedicated his life to the liberation of Bulgaria (and, particularly, the region of Thrace).

Petko Voyvoda was born in the Bulgarian village of Dogan Hisar, today Aisymi (Evros regional unit, Greece). He married a Greek lady from Maroneia in 1860. When a group of Turkish brigands attacked his wife, he fought and killed them all, including the leader of the bashibuzuks, Mehmed Kesedji Bey.

Beginning in 1861 Petko began fighting against the Ottomans in the surrounding areas of Maroneia, Aisymi, Enos etc. He visited Italy in 1866, where he met Giuseppe Garibaldi, who became a close friend. Petko lived in Garibaldi's home for a few months. Garibaldi helped Petko organize the well-known "Garibaldi Battalion" in the Cretan Revolution of 1866–1869, consisting of 220 Italians and 67 Bulgarians, who fought the Ottomans on Crete under Petko's command. For his service, Petko was assigned the military title of Kapetan (Captain).

Petko Voyvoda's detachment, established in 1869, took part in the Russo-Turkish War of 1877-78. His unit liberated Maroneia from the Turkish rule in December 1877, establishing a Christian government there. He fought against the Turks for three months and saved the local population from Turkish oppression. After that, he took part in the liberation of the Rhodopes together with Kraycho Voyvoda. As part of this effort, he led the defeat of the 1878 Muslim insurgence in the Rhodopes organized by the British agent Saint Clair. With his son and new wife Rada Kravkova from Kazanlak Petko lived in Varna after 1880 and died in that city in 1900. He founded the revolutionary committee called Strandzha there in 1896.

His revolutionary work has been commemorated with numerous monuments all around Bulgaria, as well as in his native village in modern Greece and on the hill of Gianicolo in Rome, where a monument of Garibaldi also stands. The TV series Captain Petko Voivode written by Nikolay Haytov and first aired in 1981 also popularized him as a national hero. There are several Bulgarian patriotic songs dedicated to Petko and his comrades.

Petko Voyvoda Peak on Livingston Island in the South Shetland Islands, Antarctica is also named in his honor.

Monuments dedicated to Petko Voyvoda can be found in Aisymi (Greece), his place of birth, as well as in Rome (Italy), Kyiv (Ukraine) and in Varna, Sofia, Burgas, Plovdiv, Haskovo and other places in Bulgaria.
