= Sozopol Gap =

Saddle point in the South Shetland Islands, Antarctica

Location of Tangra Mountains on Livingston Island in the South Shetland Islands.

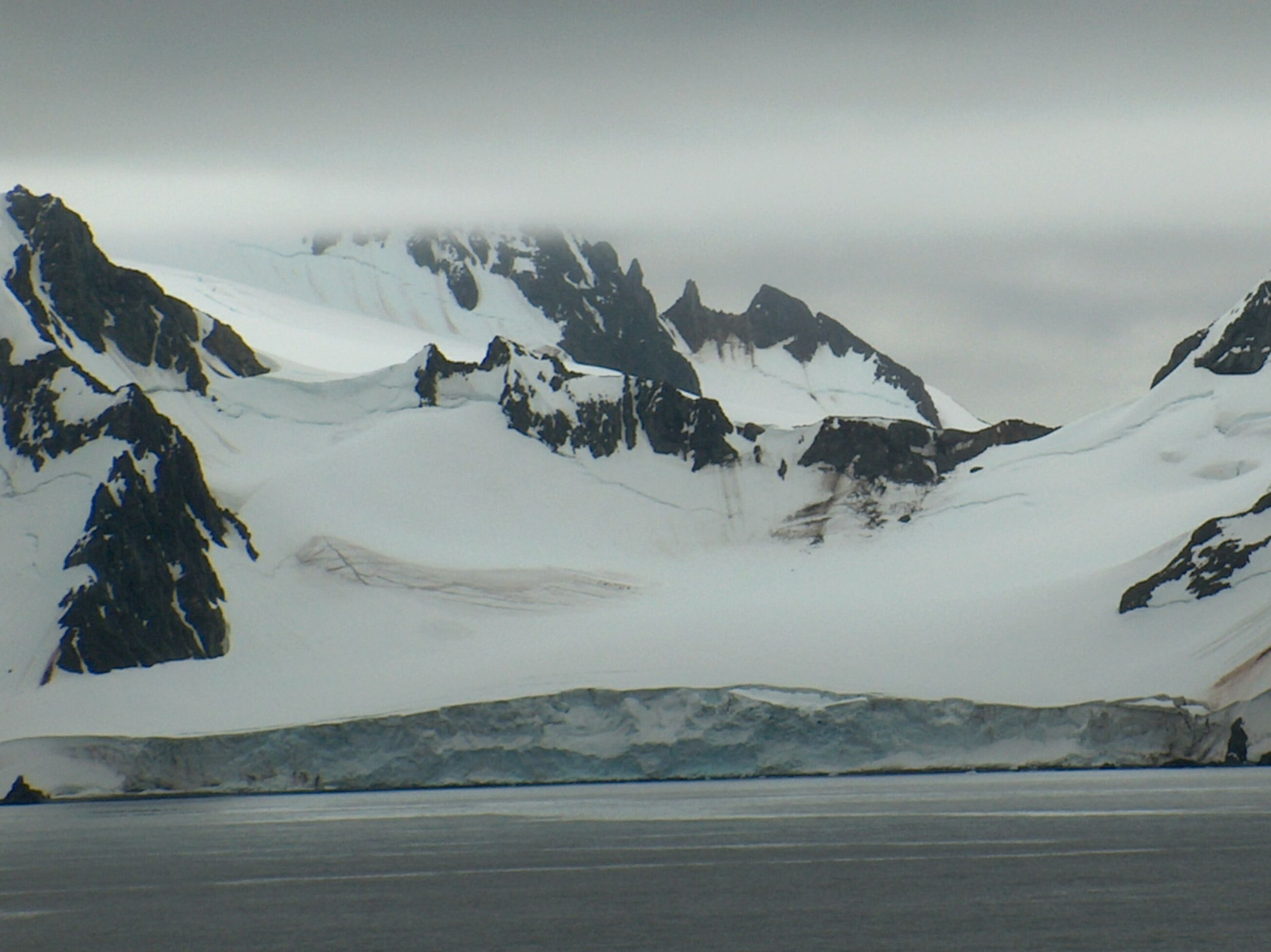
Sozopol Gap from Bransfield Strait, with Pautalia Glacier in the foreground.

Topographic map of Livingston Island, Greenwich, Robert, Snow and Smith Islands.

Sozopol Gap (Sozopolska Sedlovina \so-'zo-pol-ska se-dlo-vi-'na\) is a partly ice-covered, 500 m long saddle in Delchev Ridge, Tangra Mountains, eastern Livingston Island in the South Shetland Islands, Antarctica bounded to the southwest by Petko Voyvoda Peak and to the northeast by Kaloyan Nunatak. It is at an elevation of 220 metres, and is part of the divide between the glacial catchments of Sopot Ice Piedmont to the northwest and Pautalia Glacier to the southeast.

The gap is named after the Bulgarian town of Sozopol.

== Location ==
The midpoint is located at 62°37′35.5″S 59°52′13″W.

== Maps ==
- L.L. Ivanov et al. Antarctica: Livingston Island and Greenwich Island, South Shetland Islands. Scale 1:100000 topographic map. Sofia: Antarctic Place-names Commission of Bulgaria, 2005.
- L.L. Ivanov. Antarctica: Livingston Island and Greenwich, Robert, Snow and Smith Islands. Scale 1:120000 topographic map. Troyan: Manfred Wörner Foundation, 2009. ISBN 978-954-92032-6-4
