= Siv Kladenets =

- Village
- Location within Bulgaria
- Coordinates: 41°25′N 26°10′E
- Country: Bulgaria
- Province: Haskovo Province
- Municipality: Ivaylovgrad
- Elevation: 73 m (240 ft)
- Time zone: UTC+2 (EET)
  - Summer (DST): UTC+3 (EEST)

Siv Kladenets is a village in the municipality of Ivaylovgrad, in Haskovo Province, in southern Bulgaria. It was known as "Gökçepınar" during Ottoman rule and was taken present name in 1934 (According to Bulgarian Wikipedia of Siv Kladenets)
