= Orfeas =

Orfeas Ορφέας
- Municipal unit
- Location within the regional unit

- Location within Greece
- Coordinates: 41°16′N 26°01′E
- Country: Greece
- Administrative region: East Macedonia and Thrace
- Regional unit: Evros
- Municipality: Soufli
- Districts: 7

Area
  - Municipal unit: 643.266 km^{2} (248.366 sq mi)
- Elevation: 20 m (66 ft)

Population (2021)
  - Municipal unit: 4,054
  - Municipal unit density: 6.302/km^{2} (16.32/sq mi)
- Time zone: UTC+2 (EET)
  - Summer (DST): UTC+3 (EEST)
- Postal code: 680 04
- Area code: 25530
- Vehicle registration: OP

Orfeas (Greek: Ορφέας), named after the mythical musician Orpheus, is a former municipality in the Evros regional unit, East Macedonia and Thrace, Greece. Since the 2011 local government reform it is part of the municipality Soufli, of which it is a municipal unit. Its land area is 643.266 km^{2} (248.366 sq mi). It is located in the north-central part of Evros, and borders both southeastern Bulgaria and northwestern Turkey. The seat of the municipality was in Lavara (pop. 747 in 2021). Much of the land is mountainous and forested to the west, extending up to the Rhodope regional unit. It is linked with the EO51 road, which is part of European route E85. The town of Lávara sits on a plain. It is located SE of Svilengrad, S of Edirne, Turkey and Orestiada, and 13 km N of Soufli and 78 km N of Alexandroupoli. The municipality's next largest towns are Agriani, Mega Dereio and Amorio.

== History ==
The municipality was affected by flooding of the Evros river in February and March 2005. 50 houses were damaged. The rail south of Lavara and near the station were also flooded and was closed that time.

== Geography ==
Forests dominate the river banks and parts of the plain. Much of the area are used for farming. The main production are cattle, fruits and vegetables and some flowers. The mountains dominate further west.

== Subdivisions ==
The municipal unit Orfeas is subdivided into the following communities (constituent villages in brackets):

- Lavara
- Amorio
- Kyriaki
- Mandra
- Mavrokklisi (Mavrokklisi, Korymvos)
- Mikro Dereio (Mikro Dereio, Geriko, Goniko, Mega Dereio, Petrolofos, Roussa, Sidirochori)
- Protokklisi (Protokklisi, Agriani)

== Historical population ==
Year	Population
1991	6,905
2001	6,146
2011	4,761
2021	4,054
