= Aisymi =

Village in Western Thrace, Greece

Aisymi Αισύμη
- Community
- Location within Greece
- Coordinates: 41°0′N 25°57′E
- Country: Greece
- Administrative region: East Macedonia and Thrace
- Regional unit: Evros
- Municipality: Alexandroupoli
- Municipal unit: Alexandroupoli
- Lowest elevation: 253 m (830 ft)

Population (2021)
  - Community: 220
- Time zone: UTC+2 (EET)
  - Summer (DST): UTC+3 (EEST)
- Postal code: 680 11
- Vehicle registration: EB

Aisymi (Greek: Αισύμη, Bulgarian: Дуган Хисар, Dugan hisar, Turkish: Doğanhisar) is a village in the southern part of the Evros regional unit, Greece. It is located next to the Greek National Road 53, about 20 km north of the city of Alexandroupoli. In 2021 the population was 220 for the community, including the village Leptokarya.

== Population ==
Year	Village population	Community population
1981	671	–
1991	419	–
2001	267	389
2011	193	253
2021	186	220

== History ==
Aisymi dates back to the ancient times as an ancient settlement. Like the rest of Western Thrace, it was ruled by the Ottoman Empire since the 14th century. It remained under Ottoman rule until the Balkan Wars of 1913. At that time, Aisymi (then known as Doğanhisar, Dugan Hisar in Bulgarian) was a Bulgarian speaking village like many parts of today's Evros prefecture. The population in 1912 consisted of 400 Bulgarians.

After a brief period of Bulgarian rule between 1913 and 1919, it became part of Greece. As a result its Bulgarian and Turkish population was exchanged with Greek refugees, mainly from today's Turkey.

== People born in Aisymi ==
- Kiro Chelekov, Bulgarian revolutionary
- Petko Kiryakov (Captain Petko Voyvoda) (1844–1900), Bulgarian hajduk leader and revolutionary who fought in Western Thrace and Rhodope.
- Mara Mihailova (1900–1989), Bulgarian folklorist and journalist
