= Soufli =

Soufli Σουφλί
- Municipality
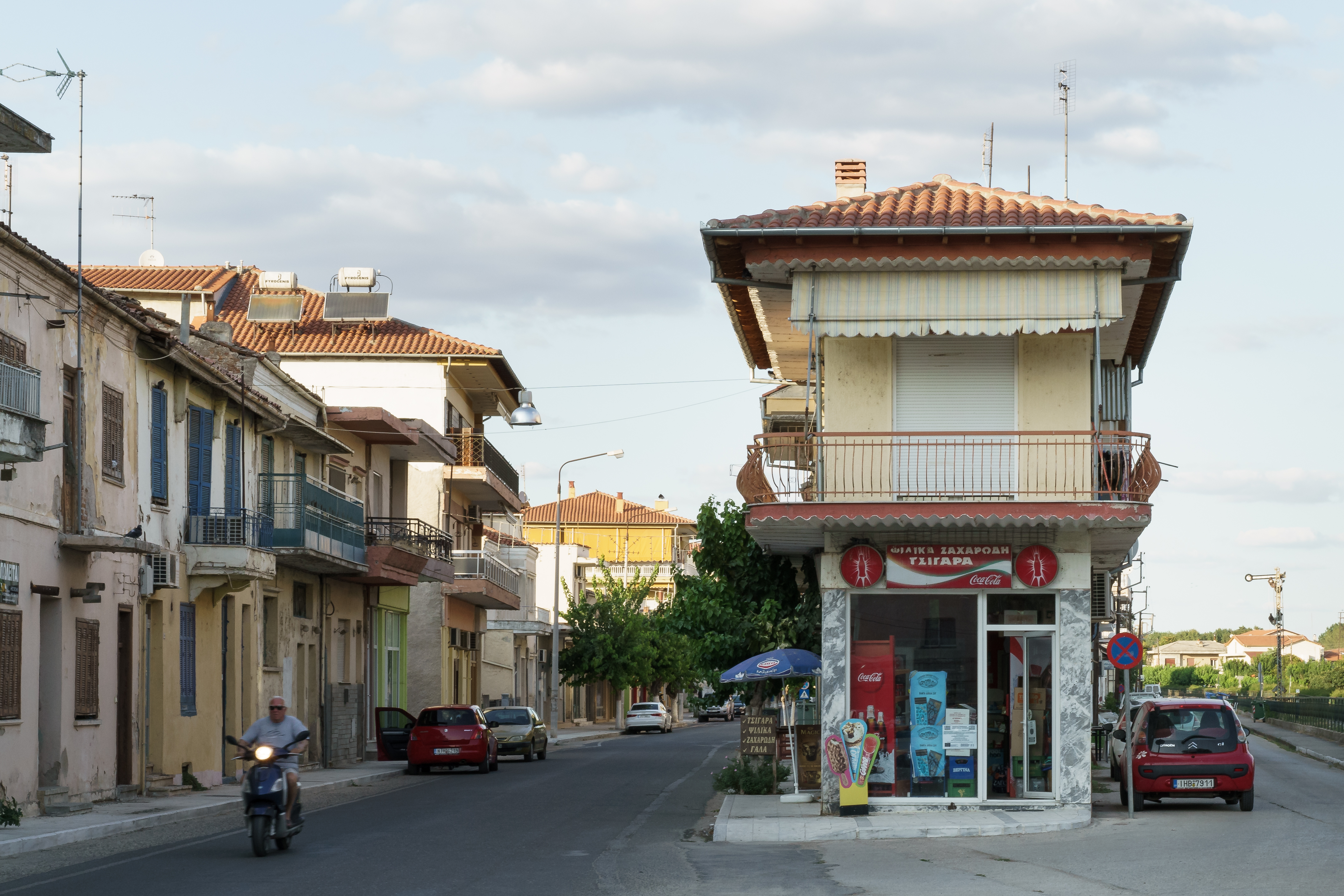
- Soufli

- Location within Greece
- Coordinates: 41°12′N 26°18′E
- Country: Greece
- Geographic region: Thrace
- Administrative region: Eastern Macedonia and Thrace
- Regional unit: Evros

Area
  - Municipality: 1,325.7 km^{2} (511.9 sq mi)
  - Municipal unit: 462.0 km^{2} (178.4 sq mi)
- Elevation: 98 m (322 ft)

Population (2021)
  - Municipality: 11,709
  - Density: 8.8323/km^{2} (22.876/sq mi)
  - Municipal unit: 5,008
  - Municipal unit density: 10.84/km^{2} (28.08/sq mi)
  - Community: 3,770
- Time zone: UTC+2 (EET)
  - Summer (DST): UTC+3 (EEST)
- Postal code: 684 00
- Area code: 25540-2
- Vehicle registration: EB
- Website: www.soufli.gr

Soufli (Greek: Σουφλί, romanized: Souflí) is a town in the Evros regional unit, Greece, notable for the silk industry that flourished there in the 19th century. The town stands on the eastern slope of the twin hill of Prophet Elias, one of the easternmost spurs on the Rhodope Mountains. It is situated in the center of the Evros regional unit, 65 km north of Alexandroupoli and 50 km southwest of Orestiada, on Greek National Road 51/E85 which links Alexandroupoli with Edirne and the Bulgarian border at Ormenio. The town center is only 500m from the Evros River. Soufli is the seat of the municipality of Soufli.

== History ==
Archaeological finds and tombs discovered in the area confirm that a settlement stood on the site during the Hellenistic period. The first recorded mention of Soufli date to ca. 1667, when the Ottoman traveler Evliya Çelebi reported that it was a large village free from taxation. He refers to it by its Turkish name 'Sofulu,' an appellation that probably derives from a nearby dervish monastery. Another version, however, attributes the origins of the name to a Byzantine landowner called 'Souflis'. Beginning in the 19th century, Soufli became an administrative center of a rich province of almost 60,000 inhabitants, extending on both sides of the Evros valley. As one of the few population centers in the region, Soufli became an important trading center. From the records of the Greek Consulate in Adrianople state that in 1858 there was a mutual teaching school in Soufli for which the community put up 6,500 piastres to pay for teachers. Between 1870 and 1880, Soufli developed significantly. The construction of the railway and of the railway station (1872) contributed to its economic development. At the same time, the discovery of a method to fight against the diseases of cocoons by Louis Pasteur contributed to the fast development of sericulture. In 1877, the number of the inhabitants of Soufli is estimated to be around 4,680. By 1900, the population had risen to 10,000 inhabitants, and in 1908 to 12,000–13,000 inhabitants. Together with its importance as a trading center, Soufli was also recognized as an important craft center. The city's cartwrights who provided the whole region of Thrace with ox-carts, famous for their exceptional stability. The second most important industry in Soufli, next to sericulture, was viniculture. Wine production in Soufli during the 19th century was just under 2,000,000L. However, the development of sericulture and the diffusion of the cultivation of mulberry trees that followed, resulted in the reduction of the land devoted to vines. But sericulture, although popular, was not the only occupation. It was considered to be more of a side-line and seasonal occupation. It had entered every house in Soufli, and during the two months of May and June it occupied farmers, merchants and craftsmen and provided significant income.

Known as the Town of Silk, Soufli is also famous for its wine, tsipouro (a local strong alcoholic drink), and cooked meats.

=== Cultural flourishing ===
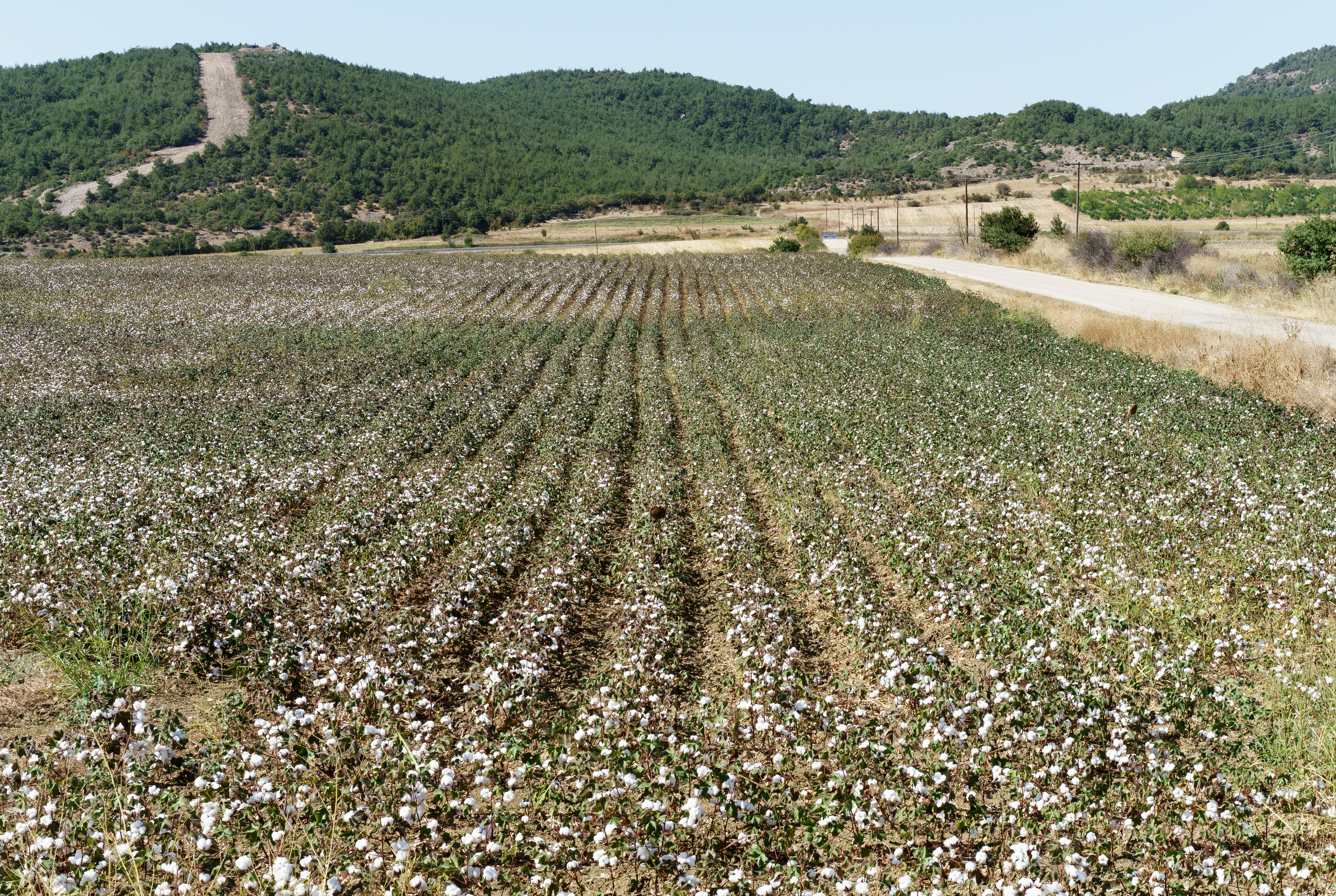
Cotton field near Lagyna

Together with economic development there came socio-cultural flourishing and the intellectual level of the inhabitants was raised. Before the middle of the 19th century, the two churches of Saint George and Saint Athanassios were already built and are still standing as real jewels of the town. Around 1860, we have the creation of the Civil School (today it is the town's Second Elementary School), and in 1880–82 the Girls School of Soufli is built and comes into operation (today's First Elementary School). In 1878, the ´Dramatic society of Soufli´ was already in existence, and in 1905–10 another 'Dramatic society' comes forward. Music has been taught in the Civil School since 1900.

=== Balkan Wars – World War I ===
The Balkan Wars, and, subsequently World War I after that transformed the region of Thrace into a seat of war operations, resulting in the crisis of sericulture and the general downgrading of the region until 1920. In addition, the incorporation of Soufli in Greece after 1922 has indicated its economic decline. The loss of the inland on the eastern riverside of Evros and the subsequent decrease in population of what was now the Greek province of Soufli resulted in the dwindling of the local market and, consequently, the restriction of the trading and craft activities of the town. That is how Soufli, from the transit and trading center it used to be, was transformed into borderland, with all the subsequent disadvantages. Moreover, the partition of Thrace deprived Soufli from a large part of its estates in the eastern riverside of Evros, which now passed into Turkish possession. In particular, in 1922, 2,250 acres (9.1 km^{2}) of mulberry trees and 625 acres (2.53 km^{2}) of fields remained in the possession of Soufli, while the vineyards were completely destroyed by vine louse. During the new period beginning with the incorporation of Soufli in Greece, sericulture remained as the most important source of income for the inhabitants of Soufli. The cultivation of wheat, corn and rye provided the town with self-sufficiency as far as nutrition was concerned, and the inhabitants made use of the empty space among mulberry trees and planted mainly legumes and other early or late cereals (multi-culture).

=== World War II ===
With World War II and the German occupation, every trading or intellectual activity stopped. Life was vestigial. With the withdrawal of the Germans in August 1944 and the beginning of the civil war, Soufli was once more full of life. The inhabitants of the nearby villages gathered in Soufli for safety, and they stayed there until the end of 1948.

=== More recent years ===
The invention of synthetic silk and the fall of the prices of cocoons have led to the decline of sericulture. Mulberry trees are becoming fewer and fewer, and after the re-allotment of land they have almost vanished. The decline of sericulture, in combination with the lack of industrial units, has forced the population to move towards urban areas or even abroad.

Soufli was affected by flooding in its low-lying areas in the 1960s, 1998, 2005 and 2006.

== Climate ==
Climate data for Soufli, Greece
| Month | Jan | Feb | Mar | Apr | May | Jun | Jul | Aug | Sep | Oct | Nov | Dec | Year |
|---|---|---|---|---|---|---|---|---|---|---|---|---|---|
| Mean daily maximum °F (°C) | 46 (8) | 50 (10) | 55 (13) | 63 (17) | 72 (22) | 81 (27) | 88 (31) | 90 (32) | 81 (27) | 68 (20) | 59 (15) | 50 (10) | 66 (19) |
| Mean daily minimum °F (°C) | 37 (3) | 39 (4) | 43 (6) | 48 (9) | 55 (13) | 63 (17) | 68 (20) | 68 (20) | 63 (17) | 55 (13) | 50 (10) | 43 (6) | 46 (8) |
Source: <World Weather Online= >"Soufli Monthly Climate Averages". Soufli Monthly Climate Average, Greece. World Weather Online. 2016.

== Silk museums of Soufli ==
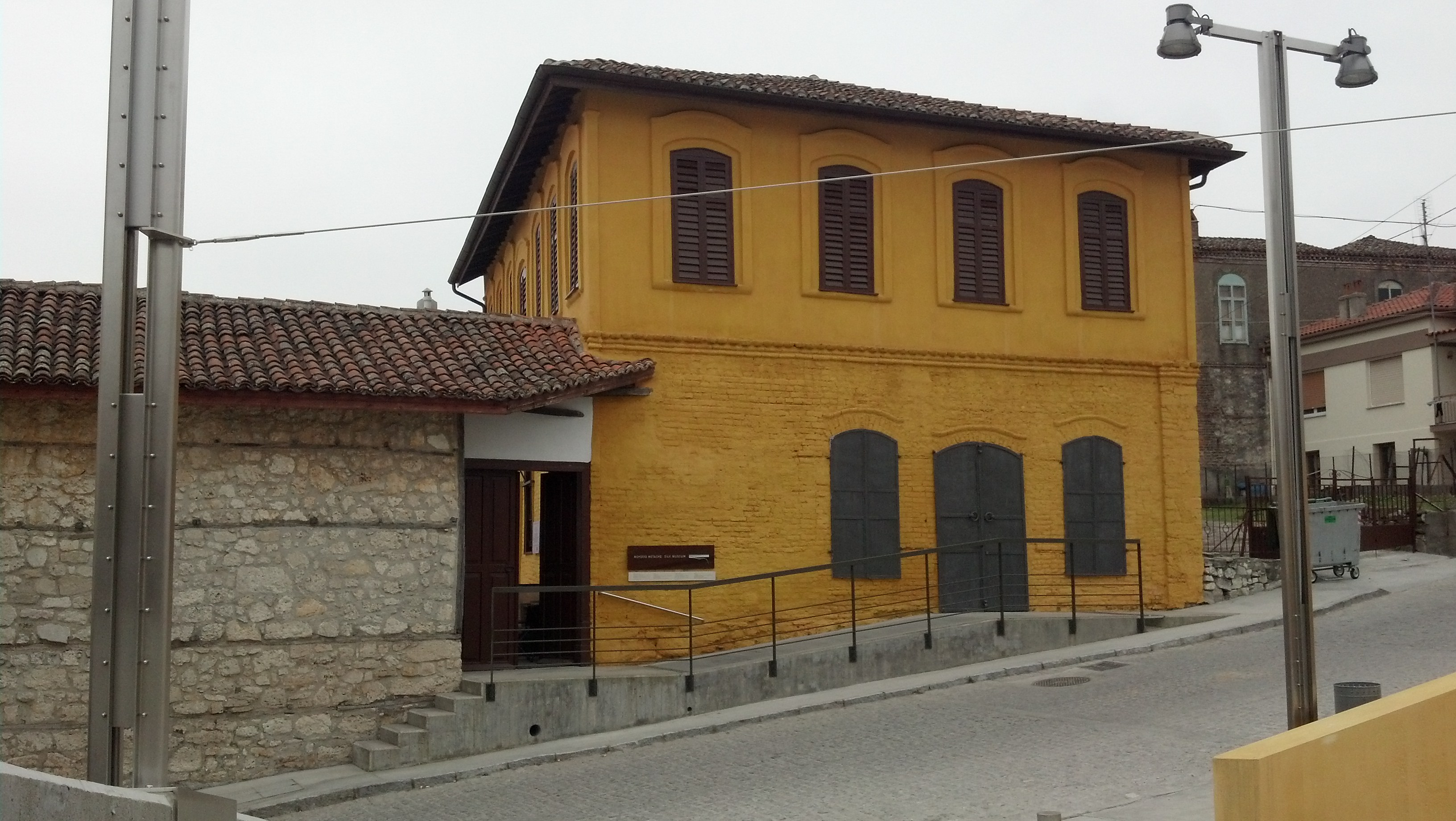
Silk museum

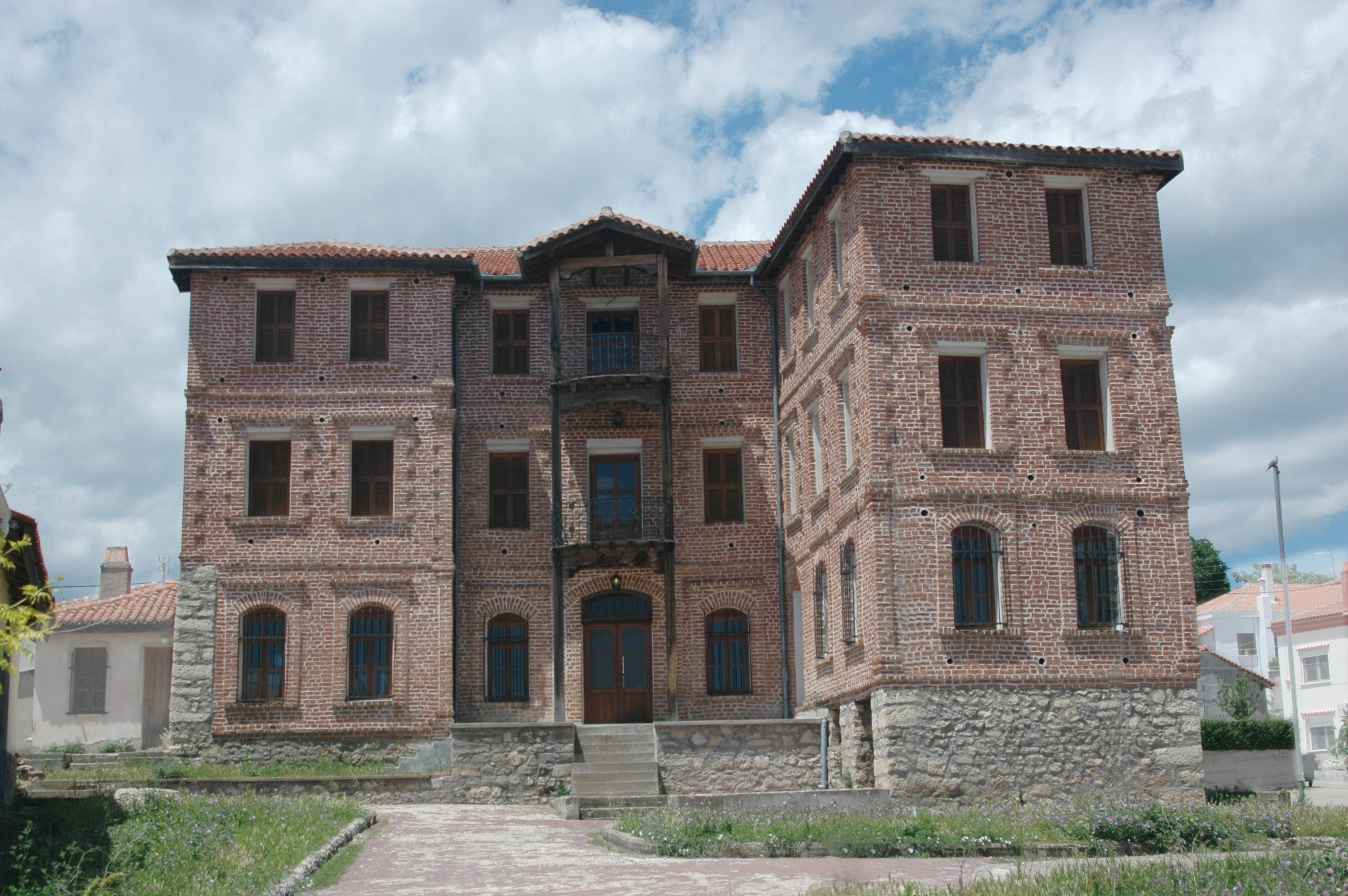
Brikas mansion

The older Silk Museum in Soufli (Thrace) belongs to the Museum Network of the Piraeus Bank Group Cultural Foundation (PIOP). It is housed in the Kourtidis Mansion (1883) and was set up in 1990. The purpose of the permanent exhibition housed on the ground floor of the Kourtidis Mansion is to show the pre-industrial techniques by which silkworms were bred (sericulture) and silk was woven. It also deals with the socio-economic significance of these activities for Soufli and the surrounding area. The exhibition is arranged as four units with 46 separate sets of exhibits of two -dimensional documentation and information material (texts, photographs, drawings, maps) and items traditionally associated with sericulture and silk-weaving.

The first exhibition unit relates the history of silk over time, beginning with China, continuing through Greek and Roman antiquity and Byzantium and covering both the West and the Ottoman period. The second exhibition unit has as its theme the stages in the breeding of silkworms from the production of the "silk-seed" to the suffocation of the cocoons. The third exhibition unit is devoted to the manufacturing of silk, from the cleaning and sorting of the cocoons to the weaving of the fine silks which Soufli once produced. The fourth exhibition unit deals with the broader socio-economic background against which silk-weaving developed in Greece and the rest of Europe in the nineteenth and twentieth centuries, with particular emphasis on the rise and decline of the silk industry in Soufli and its contribution to the development of the town. The printed matter on the Silk Museum consists of a leaflet/poster and a monograph entitled Sericulture in Soufli. An educational programme entitled "Unwinding a cocoon ..., addressed to the first classes of primary scholl and covering traditional sericulture and silk-weaving, has been prepared as part of the MELINA project (Ministry of Culture, Benaki Museum).

A more recent addition to the silk museums in Soufli is the Art of Silk Museum belonging to the Tsiakiris Family Silkmills. Opened in September 2008 in a renovated Neoclassical building (1886) on the main thoroughfare of the town, it displays the full sequence of sericulture (with live silkworms on show most of the year) and shows the more industrial side of silk manufacture and weaving incorporating fully functional machinery and exhibits from the Tsiakiri factory and videos of the various stages and methods of production. It features both live and electronically assisted guided tours (available in several languages).

== Municipality ==
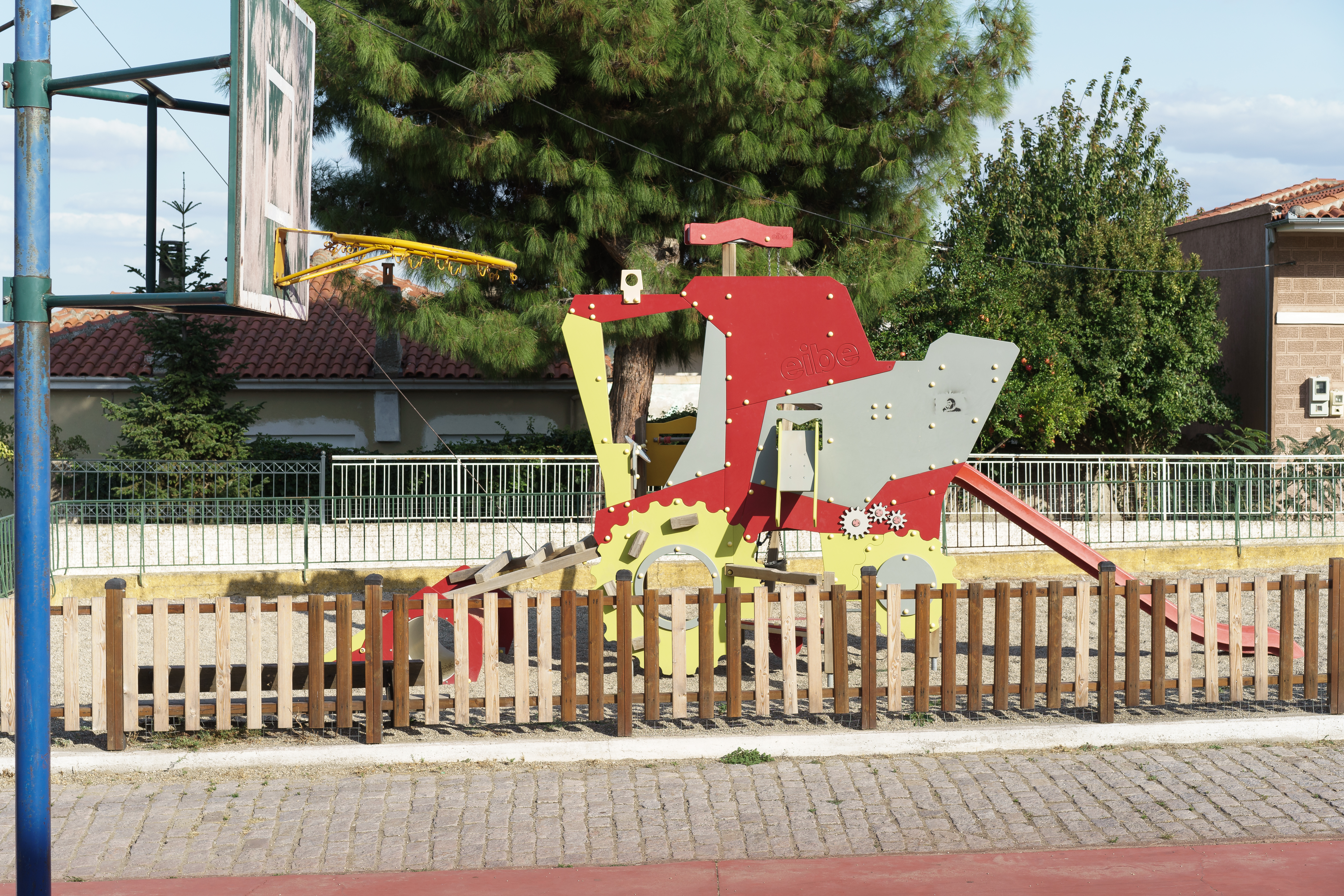
Playground

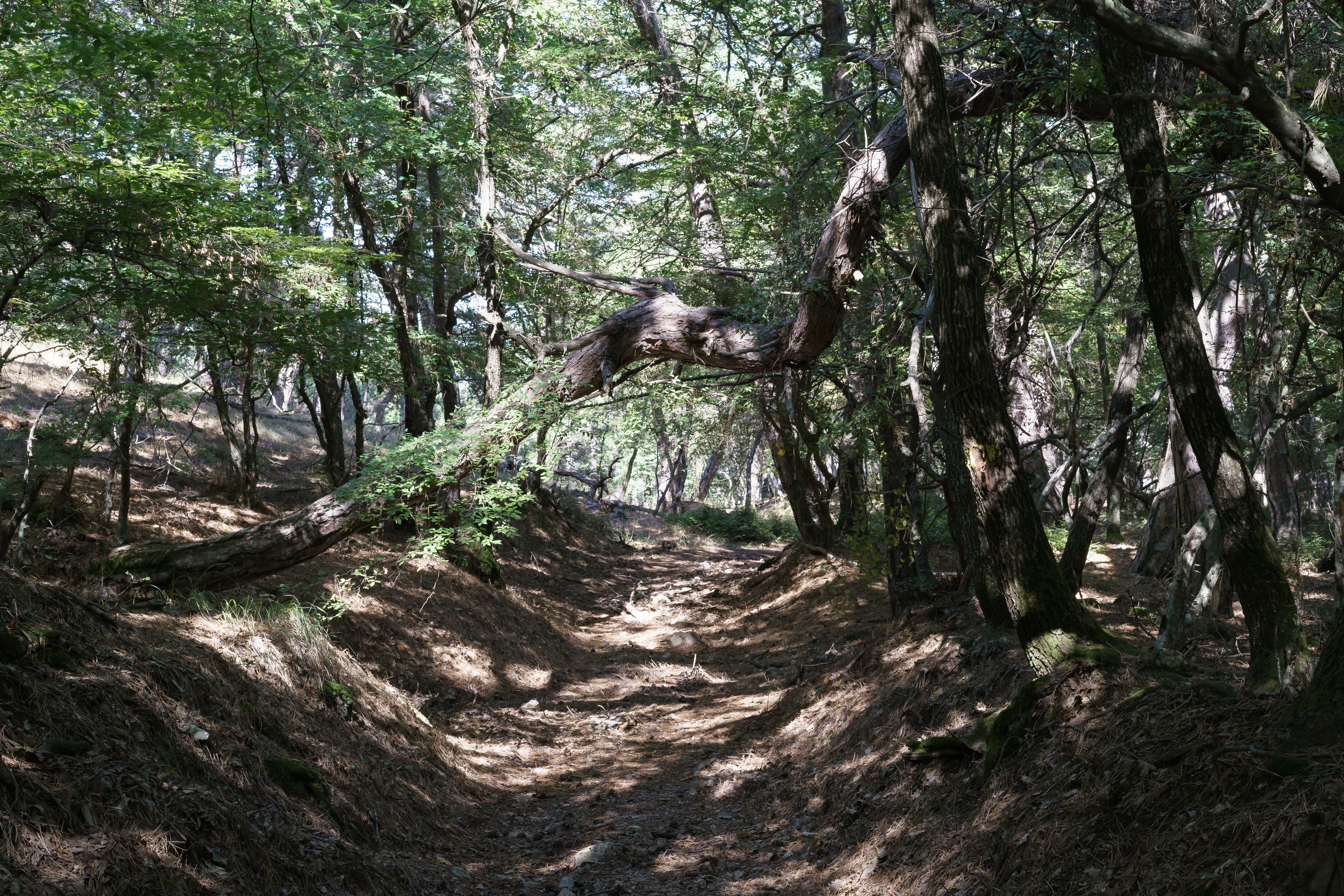
Trail in the Dadia-Lefkimi-Soufli Forest National Park

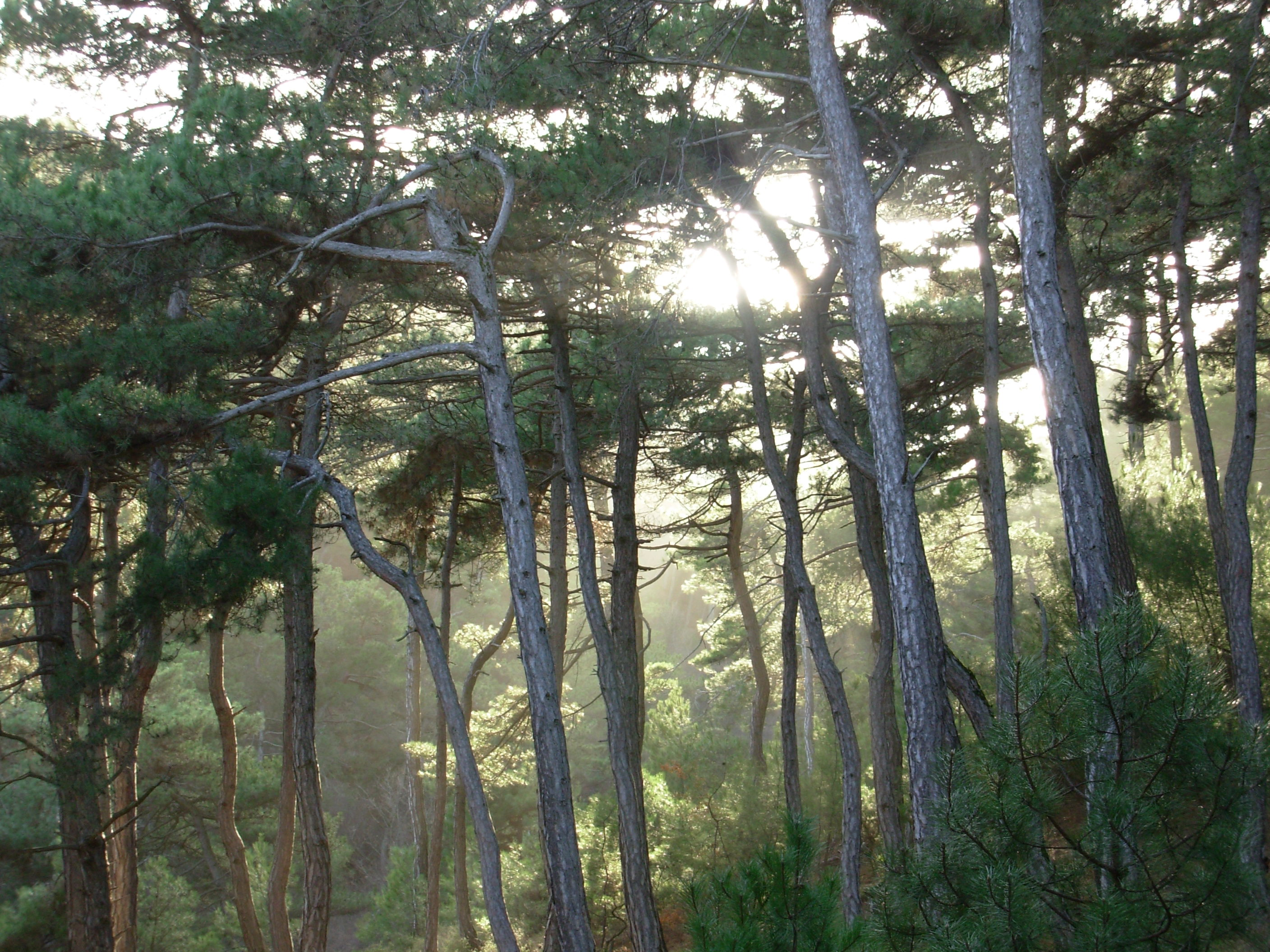
Dadia-Lefkimi-Soufli Forest National Park

The municipality Soufli was formed at the 2011 local government reform by the merger of the following 3 former municipalities, that became municipal units:

- Orfeas
- Soufli
- Tychero

The municipality has an area of 1325.721 km^{2}, the municipal unit 462.044 km^{2}.

=== Communities ===
The municipal unit of Soufli comprises the following communities and settlements (population numbers as of the 2021 census):

Soufli [ 3,770 ]

- Soufli [ 3,210 ]
- Giannouli [ 121 ]
- Sidiro [ 439 ]

Dadia [ 409 ]

- Dadia [ 403 ]
- Kotronia [ 4 ]
- Monastery of Dadia [ 2 ]

Kornofolea [ 366 ]

- Kornofolea [ 356 ]
- Monastery of Kornofolea [ 10 ]

Lagyna [ 208 ]
Lykofos [ 255 ]

== Province ==
The province of Soufli (Greek: Επαρχία Σουφλίου) was one of the provinces of the Evros Prefecture. Its territory corresponded with that of the current municipal units Soufli and Tychero, and the villages Peplos and Trifylli. It was abolished in 2006.

== Transport ==
=== Road ===
The town is located on Greek National Road 51/E85.

=== Rail ===
The town is served by Soufli railway station on the Alexandroupoli–Svilengrad line. Historically the town was on the İstanbul Sirkeci-Svilengrad line, since 1971 a parallel railway line that runs exclusively over Turkish territory so that the Soufli station is now touched only by regional traffic.
