= Metaxades =

Metaxades Μεταξάδες
- Municipal unit
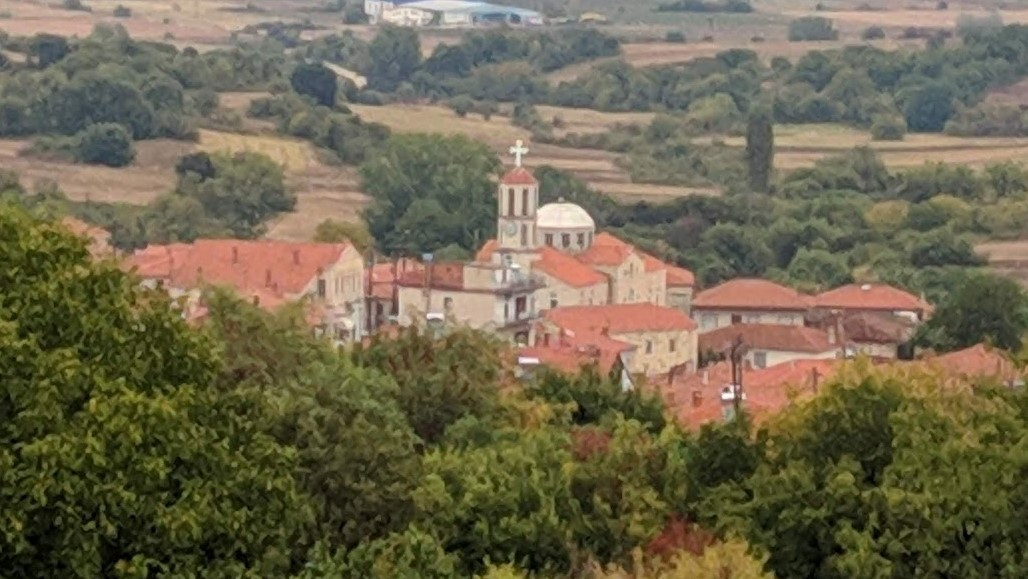
- View of Metaxades from the Remvi complex

- Location within the regional unit

- Location within Greece
- Coordinates: 41°25′12″N 26°13′31″E
- Country: Greece
- Administrative region: East Macedonia and Thrace
- Regional unit: Evros
- Municipality: Didymoteicho
- Municipal unit: Metaxades
- Municipality established: 1997 (abolished in 2011)
- Village established: Unknown, possibly 1285
- Districts: Metaxades, Avdella, Alepochori, Polia, Asproneri, Giatrades, Vrisika, Savra, Doxa, Elafochori, Vrysi, Chionades, Ladi, Paliouri

Government
  - Mayor: Romylos Chatzigiannoglou (with Christos Kissoudis as the local community president; since 2019)

Area
  - Municipal unit: 211.2 km^{2} (81.5 sq mi)
- Elevation: 116 m (381 ft)

Population (2021)
  - Rural: 494
  - Municipal unit: 2,387
  - Municipal unit density: 11.30/km^{2} (29.27/sq mi)
  - Community: 511
- Demonym(s): Metaxadiotes, Toukmakiotes
- Time zone: UTC+2 (EET)
  - Summer (DST): UTC+3 (EEST)
- Postal code: 68010
- Vehicle registration: EB
- Website: discovermetaxades.gr metaxadesgr.blogspot.com

Metaxades (Greek: Μεταξάδες, pronounced [metaˈksaðes]) is a large village, municipal unit and a former municipality in the Evros regional unit, East Macedonia and Thrace, Greece.

This lowland settlement, situated at an altitude of about 120 meters, is celebrated as the most picturesque in the wider area, and has been officially designated as a traditional settlement for its special architectural features.

== Name ==
Metaxades has undergone significant naming transitions throughout its history, with its modern designation reflecting the village's primary economic occupation.

The settlement has been known by successive names across different eras: the oldest known name (according to oral history) is Lazina, followed during the Byzantine era by Dogantzia (or Dougantzia), also referred to as Liakoup Dogantzia, and Tokmakköy during the Ottoman occupation. Finally, it adopted the name Metaxades in its modern Greek form following the liberation of Thrace and its integration into Greece in 1921.

=== Byzantine name ===
According to local historical tradition and manuscript research documented by Konstantinos Gergenis, a long-time resident and historian of the village, the settlement was known as Δογάντζια or Δουγάντζια (Dogantzia or Dougantzia) during the Byzantine period. This original settlement was supposedly located approximately two kilometers west of the modern village's present location.

The etymology of Dogantzia derives from the Greek term δουγάντζι (dougantzi), which means bird of prey, such as an eagle or hawk. The name likely reflected the geographical and environmental characteristics of the original settlement, which was situated in a rocky and mountainous terrain that would have been suitable habitat for raptorial birds. As such, it functioned as a descriptive toponym, indicating both the natural features of the landscape and the fauna prevalent in the area.

=== Ottoman name ===
During the Ottoman occupation, the village became known as Tokmakköy. The etymology of this name derives from the Ottoman Turkish term tokmak, meaning a wooden hammer or mallet used by stonemasons and craftspeople. This occupational designation reflects the village's primary economic activity during the Ottoman occupation, stone masonry and construction work. The distinctive light beige stone quarried in the region, known locally as "lithopetra", became characteristic of the village's architecture and was exported to surrounding areas like Alepochori, Avdella, and Paliouri, where similar stonework traditions persisted.

The transition to the Ottoman Turkish name during the Ottoman occupation was part of a broader pattern of Turkification integration in occupied territories. While some scholars have attributed the name to a founder figure named Dimitrios Toukmatsis or Toukmakiotis (who is rumored to be the first permanent resident to establish a house in the relocated settlement), historical documentation of this individual remains unclear, and the occupational etymology appears to be the more substantiated origin of the settlement name during Ottoman administration.

=== Current name ===
Following Greece's liberation of Eastern and Western Thrace in 1919 after the Balkan Wars, the newly acquired territories underwent systematic administrative reorganization, including a comprehensive toponymic reform. This process was undertaken to Hellenize the settlement names of the region, which contained numerous Ottoman-era and non-Greek designations.

The renaming of settlements in Thrace did not follow the established procedures of the Toponym Committee, the centralized body that had overseen Greek name changes since 1909. Instead, the Greek authorities established a special three-member committee to oversee the toponymic changes in Thrace. This committee comprised K. Geraga (Director of Internal Affairs of the General Administration of Thrace), D. Karachalio (journalist), and G. Lambousiadis (professor and teacher).

As part of this broader administrative effort, the village known as Τουκμάκι (Tokmakköy) during the Ottoman occupation was renamed Μεταξάδες (Metaxades) in 1921. The official announcement of this renaming, along with 380 other settlements in Western Thrace, was published on 18 September 1921 in the Official Government Gazette under reform Β1/1921. The gazette was printed in Adrianople and covered settlements in the prefectures of Adrianople, Forty Churches, Raideston, Gallipoli, Evros, and Rhodope.

The new name Metaxades derived from the Greek word μετάξι (metaxi), meaning "silk", reflecting the primary economic activity that had become dominant in the village by the early 1920s, sericulture, or silk farming. This practice of naming settlements after their principal industries or products was consistent with Greek toponymic conventions, where the suffix "-ades" indicated a place associated with a particular commodity or characteristic.

== Location ==
The area of Metaxades, located near the Greek-Bulgarian border, is 28 kilometers west of Didymoteicho and three kilometers east of the border line with Bulgaria.

=== Municipal unit ===
In addition to being a village, Metaxades also serves as the center of the eponymous municipal unit, which is named after the village due to its size and significance, and is officially designated as the Municipal Unit of Metaxades. It forms the western part of the municipality of Didymoteicho, encompassing half of its total area with a size of 211.238 km^{2}.

Additionally, the unit includes the villages of Asproneri, Chionades, Doxa, Elafochori, Giatrades, Savra, Vrysi, and Vrysika, and the neighboring villages Alepochori, Paliouri, Polia, Ladi, and Avdella, the last of which, together with the village of Metaxades, forms the Community of Metaxades, following the 2011 Greek administrative reform Kallikratis.

==== Local geographic overview ====
It is an area with mild geomorphology, characterized by low hills. Its northern side is mainly covered by agricultural zones that make up 35% of the area, while in the southern part, near the settlements of Metaxades and Paliouri, deciduous forests and pastures prevail, occupying 52% and 9% of the area respectively. On the western border side and to the north, the river Erythropotamos flows.

The ravines of the area are usually shallow and meet the Erythropotamos or its tributaries, contributing to the water coverage that reaches 3% of the total land. The altitude of the area ranges from 80 to 306 meters.

==== Access and local services ====
In terms of access, Metaxades is located at a distance of approximately 25–30 kilometers from the main road of Alexandroupoli – Orestiada, while it is directly connected to National Highway 53. The connection with the rest of the prefecture and the country is primarily via Didymoteicho, which is served by long-distance buses operated by KTEL, based in the town.

The services provided are limited, as they mainly focus on food and coffee within the village but also in the surrounding villages.

== History ==
The history of Metaxades before the Ottoman occupation is not well documented, with the earliest accounts based on oral traditions. However, the town later rose to prominence, flourishing as an important trade center and serving as the setting for pivotal events that shaped the region and influenced the Greek Civil War.

=== Byzantine era ===
According to the locals and some folklorists, near today's Metaxades, about two kilometers west of the village, was an old village called "Dogantzia" or "Dougantzia". The name is likely derived from the word dougantzi, which refers to a bird of prey and reflects the mountainous and rocky terrain of the village's location.

That village was the site of the first settlement of the inhabitants of Metaxades, until 1285, when a cholera epidemic forced the inhabitants to leave the settlement, and later to look for a new place of settlement.

Survivors either sought refuge in the towns of Varna and Sozopol or fled to nearby forests to escape the epidemic. As winter approached, those who had taken shelter in the forests returned to their village, only to find it uninhabitable due to the overwhelming stench from the unburied corpses. Consequently, the survivors abandoned the village permanently and began searching for a new location to establish their homes.

During their search for a new settlement, the survivors chose a forested site, drawn by the presence of a young field elm tree and the prospect of finding water. Historical manuscripts mention that a well was dug near the tree, which remained functional until 1928, when it was covered by the then local president of the village, Athanasios Papapanagiotou, during the redesign of the village square. The tree itself survived in the square until recent years but eventually dried up due to the effects of cement in its surroundings.

The original inhabitants were later joined by several families from the neighboring village of Paliouri, as well as others from Epirus, Thessaly and Cyprus. These migrations were likely influenced by the village's healthy climate and advantageous geographical location. The settlement is situated among four hills: Prophet Elias (also known as Kouri), Pano Toumba, Kato Toumba, and Asvestaria. These hills played a crucial role in providing refuge during critical times.

=== Ottoman Occupation ===
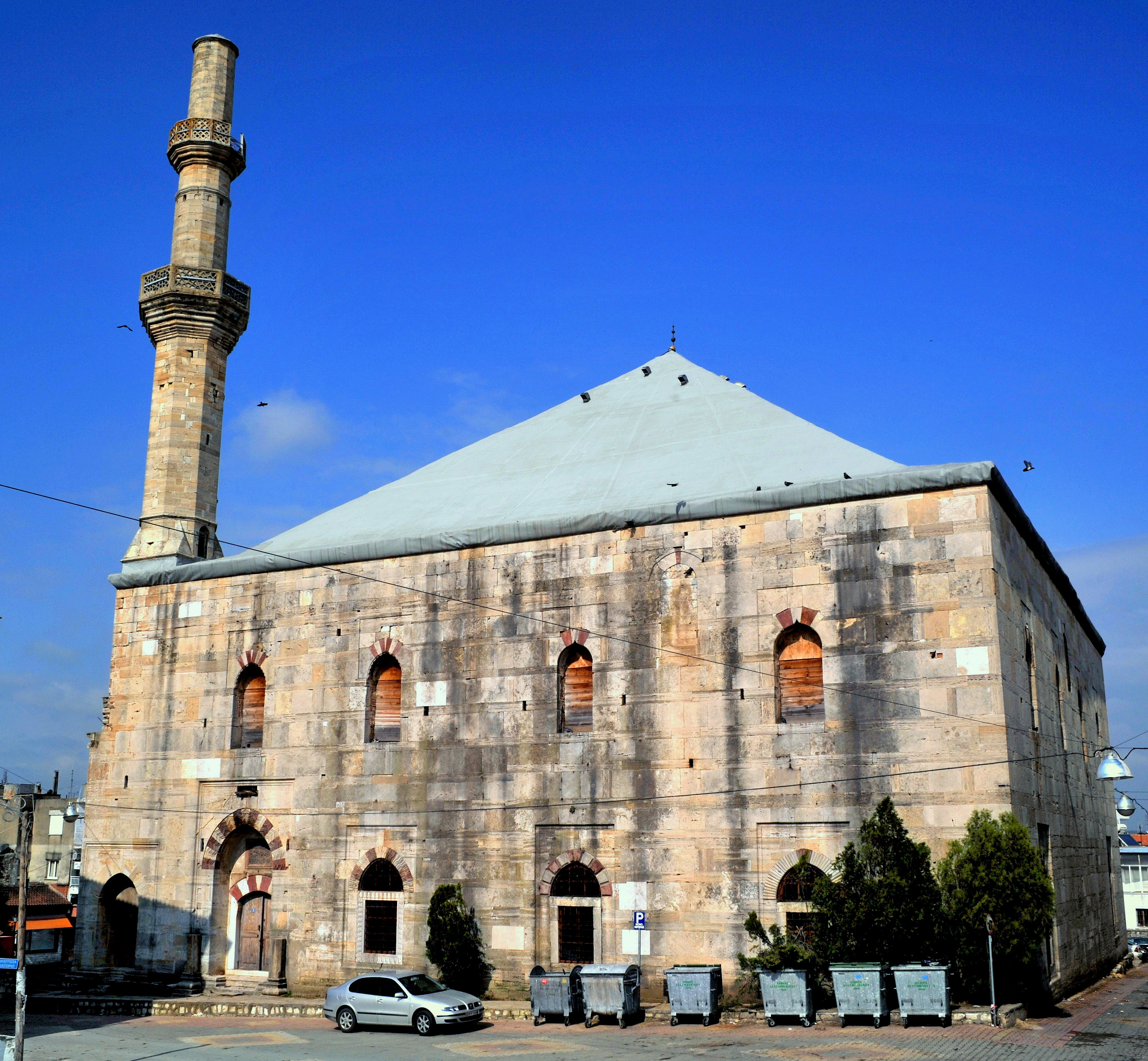
The Çelebi Sultan Mehmed Mosque (1420) in Didymoteicho is one of Europe's oldest and most important Ottoman monuments

==== Ottoman Invasion ====
In 1361, after the founding of the village, the Turks led by Sultan Murad I invaded Didymoteicho and the surrounding area after a 12-year siege. In the same year, they also occupied the region from Edirne to Plovdiv.

Other historians, relying on Byzantine and other sources, mention that the capture of Edirne took place either in 1369 or after 1371, and they also note that the operations were not directed by Murad but by Turkish beys who were only theoretically subordinate to the Ottomans, as communications between Thrace and Anatolia were cut off from 1366 to 1377.

==== Ottoman occupation ====
Throughout the Ottoman occupation, the damage to the area was both moral and material. Churches and monasteries were destroyed, wealthy merchants and landowners abandoned their mansions, and heavy taxes, and child levy. Additionally, men were sent as slaves to the depths of Asia Minor, girls were sent to Harems, while younger boys were converted to Islam and were forced to become Janissaries.

===== Administration =====
During the Ottoman occupation, the village administration was handled by a Muhtar, an assistant Muhtar, and two advisors known as "ataades", who were appointed by the six wealthiest individuals in the village, known as the "twelve". Their term lasted one year, and they had unlimited authority since they possessed the village seal.

On the feast day of Saint Dimitrios, the Muhtar would gather the villagers in the village square and appoint the constables, who were divided into field guards for corn, wheat, and vineyards, night guards, cowherds, horsemen, and pig-keepers. If the Muhtar abused his power, the village president and residents would resort to the courts, and if justified, they would appoint a new Muhtar, forcibly taking the seal from the old one and giving it to the new one.

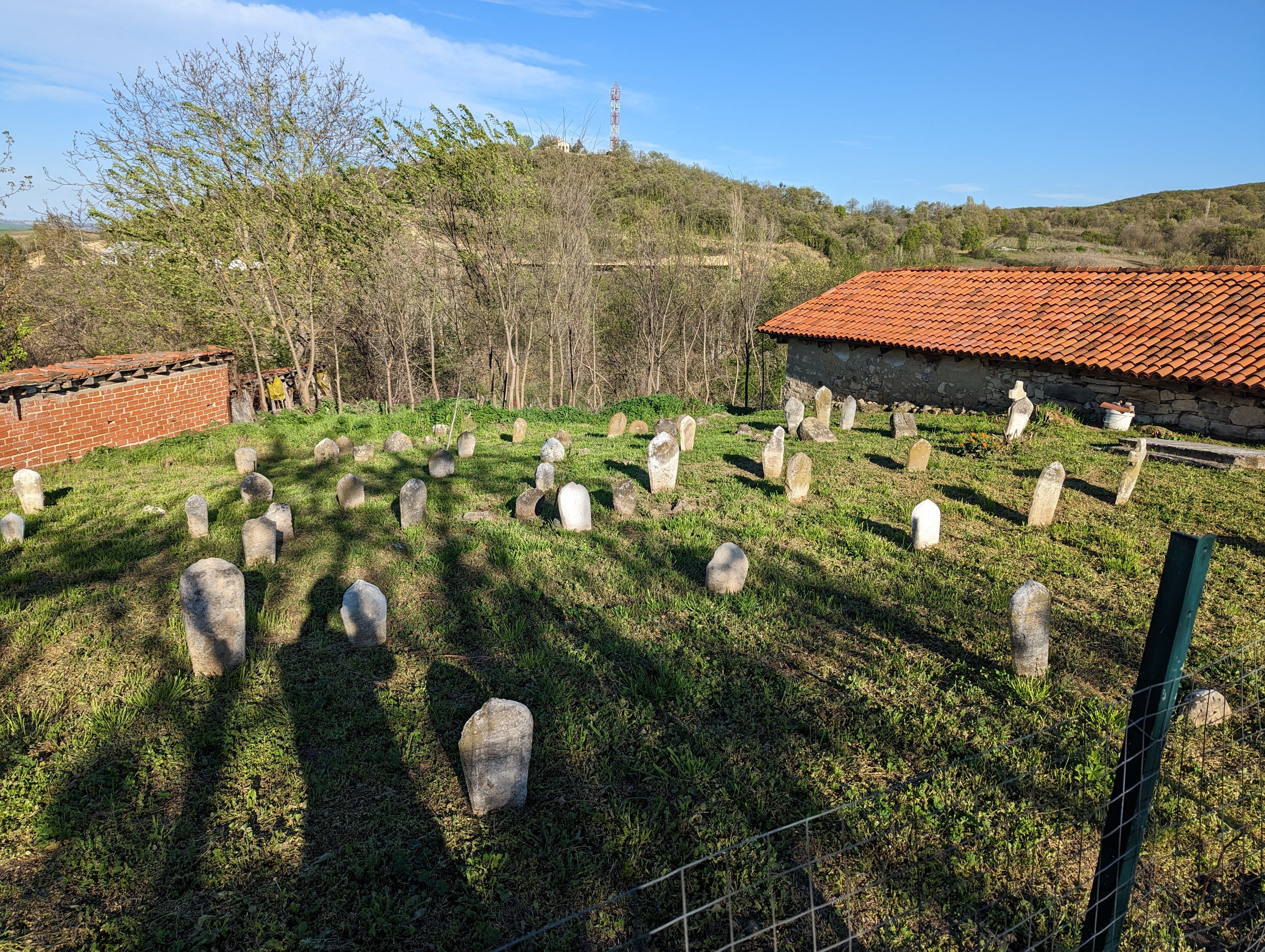
Old cemetery of the Church of Saint Athanasius in the village

===== Late Ottoman occupation =====
In 1695, the Church of Saint Athanasius was built. Most of the church was constructed underground due to the fear of provoking the Ottomans, as the Greek community often fell victim to the Janissaries who looted the Thracian region. It was used as a "Secret School" during the Ottoman occupation, and for psalm singing. The villagers never neglected the education of their children, even during the years of enslavement. They always ensured that there was a Greek school to keep the Greek language, national history, and tradition alive. As was the case throughout enslaved Greece, in Metaxades too, the Church was the driving force behind every intellectual movement, with the moral and financial support of the residents. For many years, they used the small churches as secret schools, where priests taught the children the alphabet and the Psalter. Later, in 1882, the first primary school was built by Dimitrakis Bimpasis and Anastasios Kampakas.

During the Russo-Turkish War, Russia, after 1878 (after sitting for three years), handed the area back to the Ottoman Empire. According to information from manuscripts, there was equality and generally freedom until 1908, without problems with the Turks. 1908 was a milestone year, marking the beginning of difficult conditions for the Greeks. Turkey changed its Constitution, and the conscription of Greeks began.

====== World War I and Balkan Wars ======
During the First Balkan War, hundreds of Thracians were killed because the Turks placed them on the front line. During the First World War, the Turks conscripted Thracian Greeks, who were sent on foot to the Gallipoli Peninsula, where they were harvested by the artillery of the Entente allies.

In 1912, the Turks attempted to capture Metaxades, as described in the historical song of the village. Although the Turks had never lived in the village, it was an ambition to occupy it.

The villagers prevented their attempt to approach the village unnoticed, immediately notifying Captain Giannis Sokos. Accompanied by two soldiers, Sokos positioned his troops outside the village in a location known as "Alonia".

After observation, he realized that the Turks were not numerous, with only a platoon of about forty men. To create the impression of a larger force, he strategically divided his soldiers. He caught the Turks by surprise by throwing grenades.

The villagers assisted in any way they could, with one person climbing the church bell tower to shoot warning shots to Greek outposts in the area that the Turks were attacking Metaxades. Together, they successfully repelled the Turks and prevented any further attempts to capture the village.

The Arvanite villages were plundered during the Balkan Wars, and their inhabitants were exiled, with many being murdered. In October 1913, Mandritsa was plundered by Bulgarians, and its inhabitants took refuge in Metaxades, as well as other settlements.

K. Gergenis mentions that in March 1914, the Turkish government conducted a general mobilization of inhabitants aged 20 to 46, emptying almost the entire village of men. Most of them fell in the battle of Çanakkale.

From 1914 onwards, Muslim Albanian refugees from Serbia settled on some villages, including Metaxades. The prefects treated the locals ruthlessly, seeking gold and not hesitating to impose the death penalty to secure it. Fear drove many to flee to the highlands, and families starved again due to Turkish lawlessness. K. Gergenis recounts a personal experience when in 1915 he saw his father, pursued by the Turkish prefect and refugees, taking refuge in the forest to save his gold coins. He also mentions other well-off fellow villagers at that time, a fact attributed to their hard work, intelligence, and cunning, such as Goudina, Terzoglou, Arabatzi, and others.

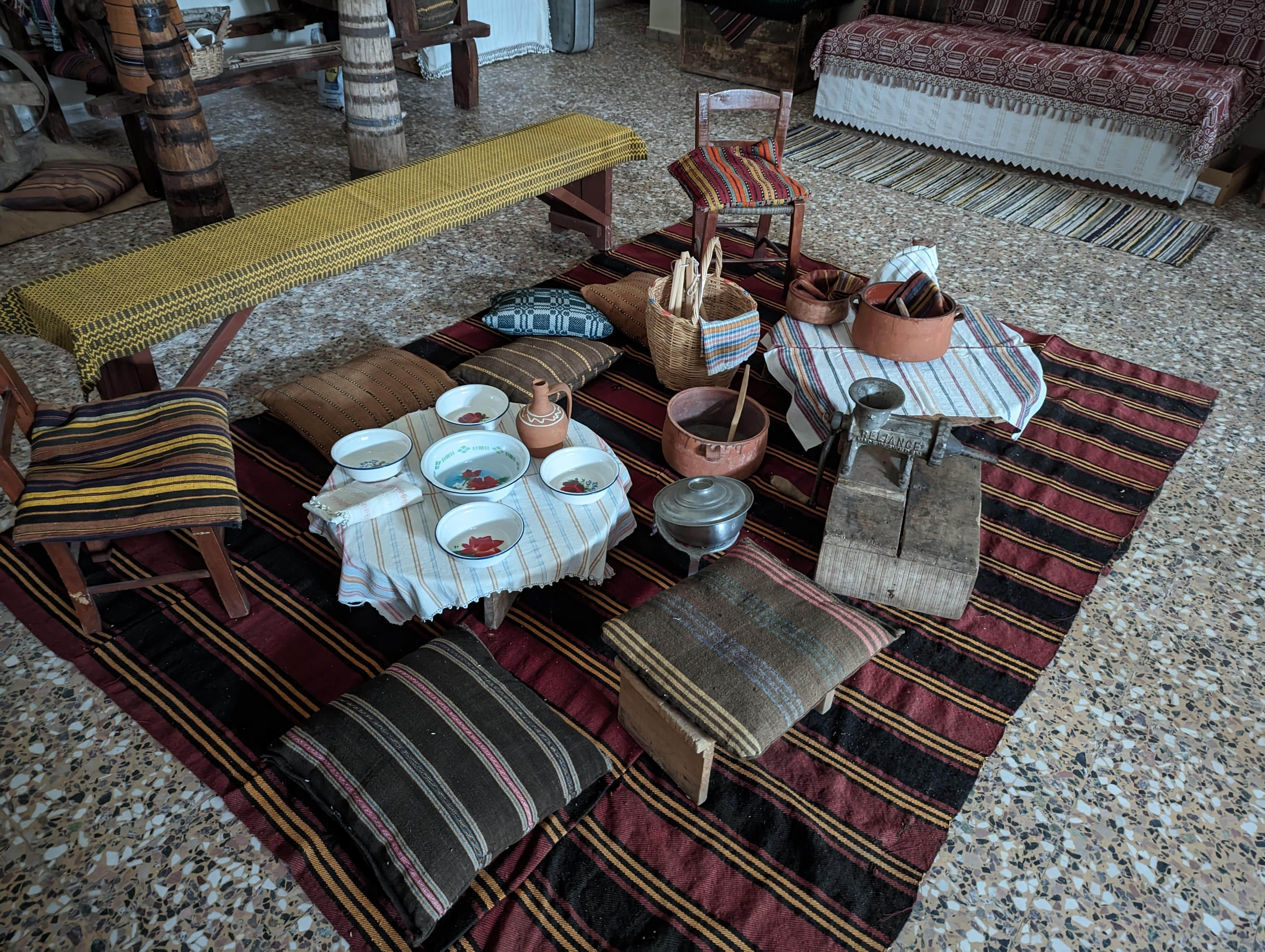
Traditional pottery of Metaxades

====== Development of Pottery ======
In the isolated mountain village of Tsikardikli in southern Bulgaria, according to testimonies of elders, "everyone made ceramics" in the early 20th century. Shortly after the Balkan Wars, the village fell under Bulgarian territory during the border realignment defined by the Treaty of Bucharest. The villagers, including Greek potters, were displaced. Some of these craftsmen settled and opened workshops in Metaxades. After crossing the Greek border, they stayed in Metaxades for a few months, built the first kiln, and taught their trade to the locals. Thus, the production of ceramics in the village began, developing and lasting until the 1970s and 1980s.

Contacts between Metaxades and Tsikardikli already existed before 1914, as a Greek resident of Metaxades, having married a potter's daughter from Tsikardikli, had learned the trade from his father-in-law. Upon returning to Metaxades, he then built the first kiln in the village.

After 1923, many ceramic manufacturing centers on both sides of the Evros suffered from well-controlled borders that cut them off from the villages on the other bank and impeded commercial transactions. Thus, the pots made in Uzunköprü and Keşan no longer crossed the Evros and therefore no longer supplied the significant regional market of Soufli. As a result, potters trained in Metaxades opened new workshops in Soufli. The craftsmen there made common, unglazed, wheel-thrown pottery, which they themselves sold on the market. These two production centers gradually gained importance, in Metaxades, between 1910 and 1960, 70 people were engaged in this artisanal activity, and between 1940 and 1960, 15 workshops operated there. They declined from the 1970s onwards.

=== Bulgarian occupation ===
On 28 September 1915, the Bulgarians, after occupying the area of Didymoteicho, following an agreement with the Turks in exchange for Bulgaria's participation in the First World War, arrived in the village and lived peacefully with the inhabitants for a year. However, in September 1916, they began to show their true intentions. They sought by all means the Bulgarisation of the region and, in addition to committing atrocities, carried out other actions: they brought teachers from Bulgaria, imprisoned Greek teachers and priests, exiled Metropolitan Filaretos, and threatened everyone. Of course, the mobilizations were not lacking.

According to K. Gergenis, during the war of 1916–1918, when the opposing forces were England, France, Greece, and Italy on one side and the alliance of the Ottoman Empire and Bulgaria on the other, he served in the Bulgarian army as a conscript and fought against his compatriots in the battle of Asprovalta.

On 19 March 1920, a Bulgarian officer and two komitatzides captured three livestock traders from the village Tokmakköy (now Metaxades) near the border, transported them to the village of Mandritsa in Bulgarian territory, stole 16,000 leva from them, and then released them.

ATTACK BY KOMITADJIS IN DIDYMOTEICHO According to a telegram from Didymoteicho, 200 Bulgarian and Turkish komitadjis surrounded the village of Chomakion and attempted to set it on fire. A reinforcement detachment, accompanied by a nearby sentry post, attacked the bandits, and after a fierce clash, forced them to flee. Three komitadjis were killed, and a woman and a child were struck by the bandits’ bullets. Two women were injured. None of our soldiers were harmed. The telegram highlights the heroism of the detachment. The pursuit of the gang continued.

— Newspaper Estia

The effort to exterminate the Hellenism of Thrace and the Bulgarisation of the region, initiated by the Bulgarian komitatzides in the first decade of the century, was pursued by the Bulgarians during the First and Second Balkan Wars and the First World War until its liberation by the Greek army.

=== Liberation of Thrace ===
On 22 May 1920, K. Gergenis notes, Metaxades was liberated by the Serres Division. The first company, led by Captain Stamatis Tsiolas and Sergeant Dimitrios Komas, guarded the village's borders. With the arrival of the second company, they moved to Chelidona and Dereio, while they were replaced by Captain Aristodemos and Sergeant Parashakis.

==== Transition to Greek governance ====
Prior to 1920, the village was governed by a system known as the Dodekara (possibly referring to an original twelve members, though later consisting of around six notables). This lifelong council was selected by the priest and villagers and was responsible for electing a Muchtar (President) to manage local affairs and agreements. Democratic election procedures for the community president were introduced after 1920. The taxation system shifted with geopolitical changes: residents paid a "tithe" and a per-capita tax (18 grosia for men aged 20–60) to Ottoman authorities until 1915, then to Bulgarian authorities between 1915 and 1920, before transitioning to the Greek tax system.

==== New attack after the Liberation ====
On the night of 30 June 1920, 200 komitatzides, consisting of Bulgarians and Turks, surrounded the village of Tsomakion intending to set it on fire, as reported by a telegram from Didymoteicho. The village had only two soldiers and two gendarmes present, under the command of Lieutenant Giannis Sokos. The invaders were successfully immobilized for about an hour until a transitional detachment of gendarmes, led by General Georgios Lagoudakis, attacked the robbers and drove them away. This battle lasted for 1.5 hours, resulting in the deaths of three komitatzides, who were later found to be mercenaries in the service of Jafer Tayyar, the military commander of Edirne, according to documents discovered on a killed komitatzis. Additionally, a woman and a child were killed by Bulgarian gunfire, and two women were injured. None of the Greek soldiers were injured. The weapons left behind by the robbers were identified as Lebel type. The telegram from Didymoteicho emphasized the bravery of the detachment and noted that the pursuit of the gang continued.

=== Interwar period ===
After the Asia Minor Catastrophe in 1922, a total of 17 refugees arrived in Metaxades, specifically 8 men and 9 women.

The building where the Elementary School of Metaxades is housed was founded in 1934. In 1968, it was renovated into a two-floor establishment and is housing the Elementary and the Kindergarten of Metaxades to this day.

After the end of World War II, Greece was bloodied for almost five years by civil strife. The villages were emptied, and the few who remained were elderly. Women and children were taken to the children's towns of the islands. In Metaxades, a battle of utmost importance took place, lasting three days and nights, ending with a victory for the soldiers.

==== The great storm of 1924 ====
On the afternoon of 24 July 1924, at approximately 15:00, a severe weather event occurred in the village, as well in the general region of Didymoteicho. A powerful and unprecedented tornado, accompanied by hail, struck the area, causing extensive destruction across at least 18 villages. The storm resulted in widespread agricultural damage, destruction of infrastructure, and significant distress among the rural population. The storm remains one of the most destructive weather events recorded in the region during the early 20th century. It had a lasting impact on local agriculture and prompted calls for more structured disaster relief mechanisms in rural Greece.

===== Meteorological phenomenon =====
Eyewitnesses reported observing dark clouds approaching from the northwest, followed by a prolonged low-pitched rumbling sound. Shortly thereafter, a strong wind began to blow, intensifying rapidly. Within minutes, darkness enveloped the area, and the tornado reached full force. Debris, including soil, stones, branches, and other objects, was lifted tens of meters into the air. Trees, some of which were centuries old, were uprooted or snapped. Entire bundles of harvested wheat were swept away from fields and threshing floors. Visibility was reduced to less than five meters in some areas.

===== Damage and impact =====
The tornado and the subsequent hailstorm, featuring hailstones reportedly the size of eggs, devastated the region's spring crops. The damage extended across 18 villages, including Alepochori, Metaxades, Avdella, Polia, Paliouri, Savra, Asproneri, Evgeniko, Elafochori, Ladi, Trava, Chionades, Sitochori, Ampelakia, Neochori, Poimeniko, Thourio, and Sofiko. Several other villages suffered partial damage, while 25 villages reportedly remained unaffected.

In addition to crop destruction, the storm caused severe damage to agricultural infrastructure. Fields planted with corn were buried under thick layers of earth, rendering them unrecognizable. Mulberry trees were destroyed to such an extent that silkworm cultivation for the following year was considered doubtful. Tobacco, a key cash crop of the area, was annihilated, along with cotton, legumes, and market garden produce.

Residential structures in some villages collapsed, and several human and animal casualties were reported. In the village of Ladi, entire homes were reportedly swept from the hillside into the plain below. In Metaxades and Paliouri, livestock were carried away and drowned in the Erythropotamos River, which overflowed its banks. Hail reportedly accumulated to a depth of half a cubit (approximately 25 cm) in certain locations.

While the exact number of casualties remained undetermined at the time, early reports indicated multiple minor injuries and a small number of fatalities.

===== Community response =====
The extent of the disaster led to significant despair among the affected population. Inhabitants of the village of Paliouri, for example, announced the cancellation of their annual religious festival, traditionally held on 27 July, due to the destruction.

Local leaders and farmers began petitioning government authorities to assess the damage and provide relief. Proposals included deferral of agricultural debts, suspension of tax obligations, and provision of seed for the next planting season. There were also appeals for broader governmental intervention to support the affected rural communities.

Contemporary reports described the 1924 crop as one of the best in recent years, with yields reportedly quadrupling those of the previous year. The financial losses were estimated to exceed thirty million drachmas, not including losses of livestock and housing.

==== Dissolution of the Community Council of Metaxades ====
In May 1939, the community council of Metaxades, was officially dissolved by governmental decree during a period of administrative restructuring in the early 20th century. This action was part of a broader policy affecting multiple rural communities across the country, aimed at reorganizing local governance frameworks for reasons that may have included depopulation, financial instability, or inefficiency in local administration.

=== Greek Civil War (1946–1949) ===
After the end of World War II, Greece was bloodied for almost five years by the civil strife. The villages were empty and the few who remained were elderly. The women and children went to the children's towns of the islands. The Battle of Metaxades took place in the village, lasting three days and nights and ending with a victory for the soldiers.

In 1946, on 6 December, the village was surrounded by guerrillas. After minor clashes with the national guards, the guerrillas arrested police officer Zikos and gendarmes Pavlos and Lambropoulos. The latter was released because he knew them. The first two were tried and convicted of treason and executed in the village square (for some at the Karagatsi tree) in front of the residents. Fear and terror prevailed in the village.

During the Greek Civil War, the building that is now the primary school served as one of the Greek army headquarters. The guerrillas bombed one corner of the building, which was later repaired with a thick wall at the corner facing the road to stabilize the structure. This wall extension still exists today and serves as a remnant of that era.

On 15 May 1949, about a week prior, the surrounding area was occupied by the guerrillas, so the inhabitants of the villages of Paliouri, Polia, Avdella, and Alepochori had settled in Metaxades. The soldiers knew about the guerrilla attack and did not let the farmers go to their fields. After the attack began, the panicked villagers ran to hide in the surrounding hills, where there were many strongholds (forts hidden in dirt). Each stronghold could hold 15 to 20 people.

The hill of Metaxades, guarded by Lieutenant Lazos and a detachment of militiamen, was one of the most important in Evros. A small army was also in Asvestaria, as it was called then, but it quickly fell into the hands of the guerrillas. For twenty-four hours, the guerrillas tried to occupy the hill. However, the army, with the help of the inhabitants who had hidden in the foothills, repulsed them. They also used mortars and machine guns, in contrast to the guerrillas, who possessed low-power mortars but did not know how to handle them properly. It was difficult to supply the fort with ammunition and food because the siege was suffocating. The planes that flew over the hill for this purpose often accidentally dropped supplies on guerrilla positions. Many wanted to leave the hill but were not allowed to do so by the Lieutenant, who was ordered to protect the fortress of Metaxades at all costs and not let it fall into guerrilla hands. So he sent a message for help. The army base was in Protokklisi, from where two Captains were sent to reinforce the fort. Access was very difficult due to mines placed in all the passages. Nevertheless, they broke the siege and entered the battle with a brigade from Ladi and thus managed to defeat the guerrillas.

On 18 May, the last battle took place, where the guerrillas surrendered. Most took refuge in ravines where they were killed by airstrikes. Those who survived left Greece, followed by their families and other villagers who helped them escape the army's retaliation. Slowly, people began to return to the village to find many houses burned, families torn apart, and property destroyed by both the guerrillas and the army. Over time, the wounds healed, and they returned to their work and previous lives.

According to the book "The Greek Civil War, 1944–1949" by Edgar O'Ballance, a second group of approximately 700 insurgents, including women, attacked and captured the village of Metaxades. They maintained control of the village for three days until being driven out by Greek National Army reinforcements. However, the exact date when this happened is unknown, but it was probably on 15 May or in June of an unknown year.

==== Events of 1946 ====
===== January =====
On 15 January, guerrilla bands have appeared, looting Metaxades and the surrounding villages.

===== June =====
On 10 June, an unsuccessful assassination attempt was carried out against the local gendarmerie station chief in Metaxades. The perpetrator, identified as G. Bouboulidis, was apprehended and confessed that he had acted on instructions from a Bulgarian anarchist organization. According to contemporary sources, the incident was linked to broader concerns at the time about Bulgarian paramilitary incursions and alleged collaboration between leftist insurgent groups, including both Nofic and communist cells, reportedly operating under a unified command structure.

Greek authorities at the time claimed to have uncovered lists of targeted pro-government (ethnikofrones) individuals, supporting their view that a coordinated subversive effort was underway in the region, under the guise of promoting reconciliation and peace among the population.

===== August =====
On 11 August, there was a skirmish in Metaxades. The private driver of the Gendarmerie, Kalantzis, was killed, and his weapons were taken by the guerrillas. A guerrilla was also killed, but the guerrillas took his body when they retreated.

On 24 and 27 August, there were skirmishes in Metaxades and Korymbos. Fifty guerrillas, retreating, split into two groups, one led by Evangelos Katmeridis (Captain Flessas) and the other by Theodoros Katmeridis (Ananias). One group headed towards the Bulgarian border, and the other south.

More specifically, four detachments of Greek security forces from the Didymoteicho region engaged in a prolonged clash with a communist guerrilla band near the area of Chorymba, an area close to the village of Metaxades. The guerrilla group, numbering around 50 fighters, was reportedly attempting to flee towards the Bulgarian border.

The insurgents were led by commanders identified as E. Katimeridis (also known as Captain Flessas) and Th. Katimeridis (Captain Ananias). The confrontation lasted until late at night and resulted in the deaths of two guerrillas and injuries to three others who managed to escape. Among the captured were armed fighters Tr. Theodoridis (Captain Kopteros) and D. Lampidis (Captain Giagkoulas).

In a related incident, guerrilla member G. Spyridis (or Katsakis) of the Morava band was arrested. He testified that in a prior engagement near the location Intzali, a clash between the guerrilla group and a gendarmerie detachment resulted in the deaths of four guerrillas, including the leader Morava, and injuries to three others.

===== October =====
On 11 October, according to the book "The Civil War in Evros" it is noted that 16 newly conscripted recruits from Metaxades arrived at the headquarters of the guerrillas in Moukante, a now abandoned village near Dadia Forest. This occurred during a period of increased guerrilla recruitment following the outbreak of the second armed conflict and the "escalation of terrorism" by the opposing side. The mass enlistment of volunteers to the mountains was according to the book, attributed to "unbearable terror" of the Greek Army, and the political line of Zachariadis.

===== November =====
On 9 November, a large group of Bulgarian soldiers attacked the village.

On 17 November, the Bulgarian soldiers were pursued near Metaxades and withdrew into Bulgarian territory.

On 21 November, according to telegraphic reports to the local military authorities, there was an unusual increase in guerrilla activity observed in the Metaxades area, though without any serious incidents. A significant number of ELAS fighters, trained in Maglić in Yugoslavia, had arrived in the aforementioned area. Their leader has made contact with the local communists to plan coordinated actions against Greek villages and towns.

===== December =====
On 5 December, there was a mortar attack on the police station in Metaxades. The village of the capital was besieged, and a fierce battle ensued. Despite the brave efforts of the defenders, the attackers managed to set fire to six houses in the village and loot the UNRRA food warehouses, taking 46 ox-drawn carts full of clothes and food, including 2,000 okas of glucose, before retreating.

During the battle, three gendarmes and a police officer managed to break the encirclement and reach Didymoteicho to request reinforcements. Ensign Christos Zikos, posthumously promoted to sub-lieutenant, and police officer Pavlos Galaropoulos continued the fight but eventually ran out of ammunition and were captured by the guerrillas, who then executed them in the village square. Gendarme Efstathios Lambropoulos was captured but eventually released.

As the guerrillas retreated, some residents of Metaxades followed them.

On 6 December, the village of Metaxades was surrounded by guerrillas. Upon their arrival, the soldiers faced a terrible surprise: the village had recently been attacked by guerrillas, resulting in the death of police officer Zikos and a gendarme. The guerrillas had thrown their bodies into the village square, causing absolute horror. After minor skirmishes with the national guards, the guerrillas arrested police officer Zikos and gendarmes Pavlos and Lambropoulos. Lambropoulos was released because he knew them, while the first two were tried and convicted of treason and executed publicly in the village square (for some at the Karagatsi tree) in front of the residents. Fear and terror prevailed in the village.

According to the account of Vangelis Kasapis or Captain Kriton in his book The Civil War in Evros, the attack was directed at the Gendarmerie station. The 1st Deputy Headquarters attacked both the police station and the army platoon stationed in Metaxades. The battle lasted three hours, during which the resistance of the gendarmes and soldiers was overcome. Twenty-four soldiers, three gendarmes, and the deputy gendarmerie sergeant of Metaxades, Christos Zikos, labeled a "cannibal terrorist", were captured, Zikos, known for his anti-communist stance, was publicly executed in the village square and labeled a terrorist by the guerrillas. Captured equipment included one machine gun, rifles corresponding to the number of prisoners, 46 ox carts carrying clothes and food, notably 2,000 okas of glucose from the UNRRA.

The entire episode instilled fear and terror in the village, highlighting the brutality of the guerrilla attack and the significant losses suffered by the national forces.

On 7 December, the 557th Infantry Battalion advanced to Didymoteicho, arriving at 1 pm. Upon arrival, the soldiers quickly disembarked and unloaded their supplies. One company was ordered to set up in the Jewish Synagogue, which no longer exists today due to demolition. Soon after, at 3:30 pm, the troops received new orders and were transported by car to the village of Ladi, 24 kilometers west. They then continued on foot, arriving at 6 pm in the village of Metaxades, where they set up camp in the village school.

On 8 December, a company was ordered to reconnoiter the Greek outposts along the Greek-Bulgarian border. During the reconnaissance, the 2nd Company's infantry, moving towards Metaxades-Bulgaras Horafi-Skala-Mikro Dereio, captured a group of guerrillas from the village of Alepochori.

Around noon, as the 3rd Company moved towards Outpost 51, automatic weapons and mortar fire were heard from guerrillas. The battles lasted from noon until 6 pm, and the soldiers captured Mount Skala, where they gathered for defense. They stayed there overnight. On this mountain, they also found a mass grave. During the skirmish, Captain Andrikakis, commander of the 1st Company, was killed, and a soldier from the command company was captured. Twenty guerrillas were killed. There were also several wounded, but the guerrillas managed to take them with them as they retreated.

Both sides gave different accounts of this battle. Vangelis Kasapis or Kriton claimed that 47 soldiers were captured, and eight officers and three officers (one captain and two lieutenants) were killed. The guerrillas captured seven pack donkeys, a mortar shell containing 20 grenades, 30,000 cartridges, and personal weapons of the prisoners and dead soldiers. Three guerrillas were killed, and five were slightly wounded.

They were stationed defensively on the Skala hill, where they remained all night, waiting for the battle to develop.

Weather conditions: From 5 pm until 4 am on 9 December 1946, it rained continuously, and there was deep darkness and considerable cold. The men were exhausted from the intense marches of the past few days, fasting due to the battalion's extraordinary movement, and thirsty. The officers struggled to keep them awake.

Although recruits were baptized by fire for the first time, they showed courage and composure. During the battle, our Company Commander, Captain Andrikakis, was killed, and a soldier from the command company was captured.

— Diary of the 557th Infantry Battalion

The weather was not an ally for either the soldiers or the guerrillas. From evening until dawn, it rained, and it was very cold. There was deep darkness everywhere.

The Greek soldiers were exhausted and suffering from hunger and thirst due to long marches and emergency movements. They camped on the steps, and the officers worked hard to keep them alert for possible attacks.

On 9 December, the battalion moved towards Mikro Dereio without encountering resistance. The soldiers rested and maintained their weapons and equipment on 10 December.

Meanwhile, the guerrillas also experienced violence due to continuous clashes. They avoided contact with the army and took refuge in the village of Giannouli Soufliou. Some guerrillas entered villagers' homes to dry off. However, a detachment from another battalion camped there, and a battle ensued. Nine guerrillas were captured, and three were killed.

Following an operation in Kyriaki, the 1st Deputy Headquarters relocated to the Metaxades-Didymoteicho area. There, guerrilla forces reorganized and recruited new conscripts, while rearming and regrouping their units. Concurrently, plans were made to deliver an even harsher blow than the previous attack in Dadia within the operational area of the 1st Deputy Headquarters.

On 11 December, the guerrillas began to return to Didymoteicho. The 557th Infantry Battalion formed an intelligence network in the villages to be informed of guerrilla movements. The main body of the guerrillas was in the Greek-Bulgarian border outpost area and descended to villages such as Avdella, Metaxades, Paliouri, Giatrades, Savra, Vrysika, and Kyani, either to recruit new members or to procure food from villagers' homes.

On 16 December, twelve guerrillas surrendered to the authorities of the village of Metaxades, following pressure from army and gendarmerie forces. One of them died from the hardships he had endured.

==== Events of 1947 ====
===== January =====
From 11 to 13 January, according to information received by the 557th Infantry Battalion, the guerrillas had taken over the villages of Metaxades, Paliouri, and Avdella and recruited about 40 young men. Other guerrillas burned the police station in Vrysika. The 3rd Company was ordered to move there immediately to reinforce the defenders, and the attack was finally repelled. They then returned to Didymoteicho. Despite Kriton's claims and the successes the guerrillas had in battles such as Kyriaki, Korymbos, and Metaxades, there were problems with the management of guerrilla groups.

===== February =====
On 16 February, the 551st Infantry Battalion was deployed to the area, setting up a base camp in Chelidona. In the following months, they launched a series of attacks against guerrillas operating in various areas such as Chionades, Chandras, Megali Traba, Polia, Ladi, Kyprinos, Avdella, Giatrades, and Metaxades.

===== March =====
On 4 March, the Northern Evros army began moving towards the villages of Polia, Avdella, and Metaxades despite the difficult conditions of heavy rain and mud. As they approached Gost Tepe in Polia, a group of 10–15 guerrillas attacked them with automatics. The guerrillas, led by Captain Sarafis, eventually retreated to the heights southwest of Avdella and west of Metaxades. The army was able to enter Metaxades, where they spent the night before returning to Chelidona the next day.

===== May =====
In May, the headquarters of the 557th Battalion moved from Didymoteicho to Metaxades, near the Greek-Bulgarian border. This move allowed the battalion to disrupt the communications of the guerrillas from the Mikro Dereio area to the valley of Erythropotamos.

===== June =====
====== The Metaxades Incident ======
The "Metaxades Incident", as it is referred to in American sources, occurred on 23 June 1947, when about 40 guerrillas crossed into Greece from Bulgaria near the Aklaniotiko Rema Revina, west of Alepochori.

A significant group of guerrillas led by Captain Kriton, according to government reports, surrounded a group of recruits in the Metaxades area, only 2 kilometers from the Greek-Bulgarian border. The attack took place at midnight and lasted three hours, resulting in the deaths of five guerrillas and an army sergeant. It was reported that many female guerrillas participated in this skirmish.

11 Greek soldiers provided depositions regarding the Metaxades incident. Captain George Levounis testified about the attack, expressing his belief that the guerrillas had come from and retreated into Bulgaria. Warrant Officer Konstantinos Michalakis also claimed the guerrillas had originated from Bulgaria, noting he observed "men's footsteps and animal tracks running across the Akalaiotiko Rema towards both Bulgarian and Greek territory".

Sergeant Stefanos Moutaftsides stated, "They have crossed into Bulgaria towards Greek territory a thousand times, I have seen it myself in daytime from the mule tracks and from footsteps I discerned when we went together with our platoon to look at the villagers of Alepochori reap their fields". This assertion was corroborated by two other soldiers. Sergeant Yordanis Theofanides, who pursued the bandits, mentioned, "we saw a few of them on Bulgarian territory with our own eyes and felt very disappointed at not being able to attack them".

Lieutenant Charalambos Charalambopoulos estimated that about 100 guerrillas crossed into Bulgaria. Sergeant Argyrios Zaravakis also reported witnessing guerrillas crossing into Bulgaria. Private Konstantinos Trapalis, who had been taken prisoner by the guerrillas, stated that he was held in Bulgaria for approximately two days.

Zissis Baralis, a guerrilla conscripted into a band two weeks prior, indicated that his band had been led into Bulgaria and had participated in the attack. Baralis stated, "The relations between the bandits and the Bulgars are very friendly. A Bulgarian civilian led us into Bulgarian territory. It is obvious that the Bulgarian authorities support the bandits and provide them with ammunition and other supplies. They also offer shelter on their territory. They often talk to us to incite us against the Army and the State".

24 June

Additionally, on 24 June, about 250 guerrillas crossed into Greece near Greek border post No. 53, and combined with a second group of 250 guerrillas already in Greece, attacked the Greek garrison in Metaxades. The Greek government stated that the guerrillas were repelled by the Greek army and subsequently re-entered Bulgaria.

Specifically, approximately 400 armed insurgents led by an individual named Kriton launched a coordinated surprise attack from three directions on a unit of 75 newly recruited soldiers from the 557th Battalion, stationed in Metaxades, Evros. The attackers used mortars and heavy weapons during the assault.

According to reports, the insurgents, speaking in both Greek and Bulgarian, called on the soldiers to surrender. The Greek soldiers reportedly resisted and, following a three-hour battle, mounted a counterattack that resulted in the retreat of the attackers. Several of the insurgents were killed or captured during the engagement. The remaining attackers withdrew into Bulgarian territory, approximately two kilometers from Metaxades. One Greek sergeant was killed in the fighting.

===== August =====
====== Investigation by the Subsidiary Group ======
On 29 August 1947, the Subsidiary Group of the council's Commission of Investigation of Greek Frontier Incidents adopted a proposal to investigate the incidents at Milia-Therapio, Metaxades, and Ormenion on Greek territory. This decision was made with the understanding that a subsequent on-the-spot investigation on the Bulgarian side of the frontier might occur later. The decision followed a response from Bulgaria to the Group's 19 August telegram, indicating that Bulgaria would need time to prepare documentation concerning the four alleged incidents before the Group's arrival on Bulgarian territory. The investigation on Greek soil commenced on 1 September, when the Group departed from Thessaloniki for Thrace.

===== September =====
In September 1947, community leaders from the region of Didymoteicho in the Evros prefecture of northern Greece issued a joint resolution addressing the Greek government. The document described the situation in the area as dire due to ongoing attacks by insurgent forces during the Greek Civil War. It reported the destruction of infrastructure, such as bridges and railways, and the mass displacement of rural populations who had fled their villages and sought refuge in urban centers like Didymoteicho, where basic provisions and security were lacking.

The resolution states:

In Didymoteicho, at the Town Hall, on this day the 18th of September 1947, following an invitation by the Mayor of Didymoteicho Mr. Ioannis Valtzidis, all the Presidents of the Communities in the Didymoteicho region, as well as the Presidents of the Cooperatives, gathered. After much discussion, we ascertain the following:

The situation in the prefecture of Evros, especially in the provinces of Didymoteicho and Nea Orestiada, is intolerable. The constant assaults by insurgents have created a tragic state of affairs, similar to that of Northern Epirus during the Greco-Italian War. The destruction is widespread and ongoing. Bridges, vehicles, and railways are being destroyed daily by the rebels. Thousands of villagers have fled their homes, abandoning their villages, and have taken refuge in Didymoteicho, where they have no security. They left their villages in total confusion.

Peace in name only prevails, but with no resettlement among ruins. The housing, clothing, footwear, and food supply for the refugees is impossible to meet.

Faced with this tragic situation, we resolve:

1. That military forces be deployed in the prefecture of Evros and that the insurgents be expelled from the villages and towns.

2. That refugees be provided with food, clothing, and shelter.

3. That the necessary steps be taken by the arrival of responsible authorities on-site, for the return of the population and the repopulation of destroyed and abandoned communities, along with the implementation of necessary police measures.

We authorize the Mayor of Didymoteicho to submit this resolution to the Prefect, the Government Minister, and to Mr. Valtzidis of Evros.

— The Mayor of Didymoteicho, Ioannis Valtzidis

The appeal was formally submitted by the Mayor of Didymoteicho, Giannis Valtzidis, on behalf of the community and cooperative leaders of the region.

===== November =====
Additional attacks by insurgent groups took place against Metaxades, but were unsuccessful.

===== December =====
On 2 December, clashes erupted between the 557th Battalion forces and guerrillas in the broader area of Ladi and Metaxades. After hours of battle, one soldier from the Ladi garrison was killed. The battalion reported that guerrilla losses in dead and wounded exceeded 20. Additionally, a guerrilla near the village of Mani and another near Didymoteicho surrendered to the government forces.

On 4 December, Salonika Press dispatches reported that a band of 600 guerrillas originating from Bulgaria attacked the village of Metaxades in Western Thrace. The Greek military unit stationed in the area engaged the attackers and, with timely reinforcements, pushed them back toward the border. The dispatches noted that heavy losses were inflicted on the guerrillas, with 20 left dead. Metaxades is located approximately three miles from the Bulgarian border.

On the same day, a second engagement occurred near the frontier, resulting in numerous insurgent casualties, with 20 bodies reportedly left on the battlefield. The remaining attackers retreated into Bulgarian territory. Three Greek soldiers were reported wounded.

Simultaneously, a separate insurgent group attacked the nearby village of Ladi. That assault was also repelled by defending forces.

==== Events of 1948 ====
===== March =====
On 15 March, the United Nations Balkan Committee officially announced that a group of observers had been sent to Soufli, Didymoteicho, Orestiada, Metaxades, and Ladi to investigate the abduction of children by guerrillas. The observers examined 21 witnesses, including the mothers of the abducted children. In Metaxades and Ladi, the visit took place three days after the guerrilla attacks. As reported in the newspapers, the mothers recounted the story of their children's abduction.

Observation Team 6 of the UN reported that, as of 31 March 1948, the children sent to countries north of Greece were the children of guerrillas or guerrilla sympathizers. The team also reported that some children were likely captured with adults who had been forcibly conscripted. However, the team could not confirm the mass abduction of Greek children by guerrillas for education in foreign countries.

In a later report, the team concluded that the guerrillas' failure to abduct two girls aged thirteen and fourteen from a house they entered in Metaxades seemed to support their earlier opinion. The team stated that the plan to transfer Greek children to foreign countries had been implemented, at least to some extent, but that there was no evidence to indicate whether these children had been forcibly abducted. However, there was evidence of opposition from some parents to the removal of their children. Some children escaped, some parents expressed their disapproval to the Greek army, children in some villages hid to avoid deportation, and in one village in the Evros region, it was reported that parents stoned guerrillas taking their children.

On 28 March, the villages of Ladi and Metaxades Didymoteicho were attacked by a group of guerrillas, according to an announcement by the General Staff. The attack resulted in the abduction of 33 residents and the burning of some houses on the outskirts of the villages. The guerrillas, numbering about 600, targeted the 557th Infantry Battalion, which guarded the Erythropotamos (Kyzil Dere) bridge in Ladi. The battalion suffered two losses, while five guerrillas surrendered.

===== April =====
On 3 April, the guerrillas launched an attack on Makri Alexandroupolis but were repelled after a three-hour battle. During the confrontation, two gendarmes and a member of the MAV were wounded. That same night, 500 guerrillas launched another attack on the villages of Metaxades and Ladi, both defended by the 557th Infantry Battalion. The guerrillas used artillery and mortars to enter the villages and forcibly recruit 23 men and nine young men. The battalion had two casualties and three wounded soldiers. After a six-hour battle, government forces successfully repelled the assault, inflicting heavy casualties on the attackers.

===== May =====
On 7 May, the 1st Company of the 552nd Battalion was transferred to Metaxades. Unfortunately, on 14 May, four soldiers and Captain Spyridon Vlaikos were killed by a mine explosion.

===== July =====
In the early hours of 15 July, the 559th Infantry Battalion was heading from Metaxades to Vrysika when it was fired upon by a strong force of guerrillas holding the Zodan Tepe height. In the battle, reserve Lieutenant Konstantinos Staikidis and three soldiers were killed, while six others were wounded. During the skirmish, the battalion commander, Lieutenant Colonel Efstathios Theodoropoulos, went missing and was later reported missing in action. He was later discovered to have been captured by the guerrillas. The battalion was ordered to move towards Didymoteicho, and after four days, Theodoropoulos managed to escape and report to Outpost 40 in Pentalofos Triangle.

==== Events of 1949 ====
According to witness statements, in May 1949, a force of about 700 guerrillas crossed and re-crossed the border during a march eastward from the Haidou area to attack Metaxades. After the attack failed, they withdrew to Bulgarian territory. The guerrillas have continued to march through Bulgarian territory when moving between the Evros and Belles areas and have often spoken with Bulgarian border guards. The guerrilla forces have withdrawn several times to Bulgaria under pressure from the Greek army, with the knowledge of the local Bulgarian authorities. UN observers reported that, on 15 June 1949, they watched a group of guerrillas withdraw into Bulgaria near a manned Bulgarian border outpost when pressured by the Greek army.

===== The Metaxades Operation =====
On 13 May, a plan to strike at Achyrochorio (Nea Vyssa) was unanimously rejected by the guerrilla unit's leadership, who proposed instead an operation targeting Metaxades. Although initially insistent on Achyrochorio, the commander, Cheimaros, ultimately accepted the change to Metaxades with a dual objective: to eliminate or capture the fortified Greek Army and to conduct conscription.

The Greek Army had established large, strong, and difficult-to-breach fortifications on the commanding heights around Metaxades. These underground defenses were reinforced with stone walls, barbed wire, traps, and mines, defended by two army companies.

Every day at sunset, the Greek Army rounded up 800–1,000 able-bodied men from Metaxades and neighboring villages into these fortifications. At dawn, they were released to work the nearby fields with instructions to return immediately in case of guerrilla activity or gunfire. Greek Army forces stationed in Ladi, Kyriaki, and Soufli could reinforce the Metaxades fortifications within two to three hours.

On the afternoon of 13 May, the order was given to commence the operation targeting Metaxades.

By dawn on May 14, guerrilla forces reached and took positions on the forested hills surrounding the village. At dusk on May 14, they approached Metaxades, awaiting sunrise to attack as villagers emerged from the fortifications for conscription.

On 15 May, the Battle of Metaxades begun.

===== Battle of Metaxades =====
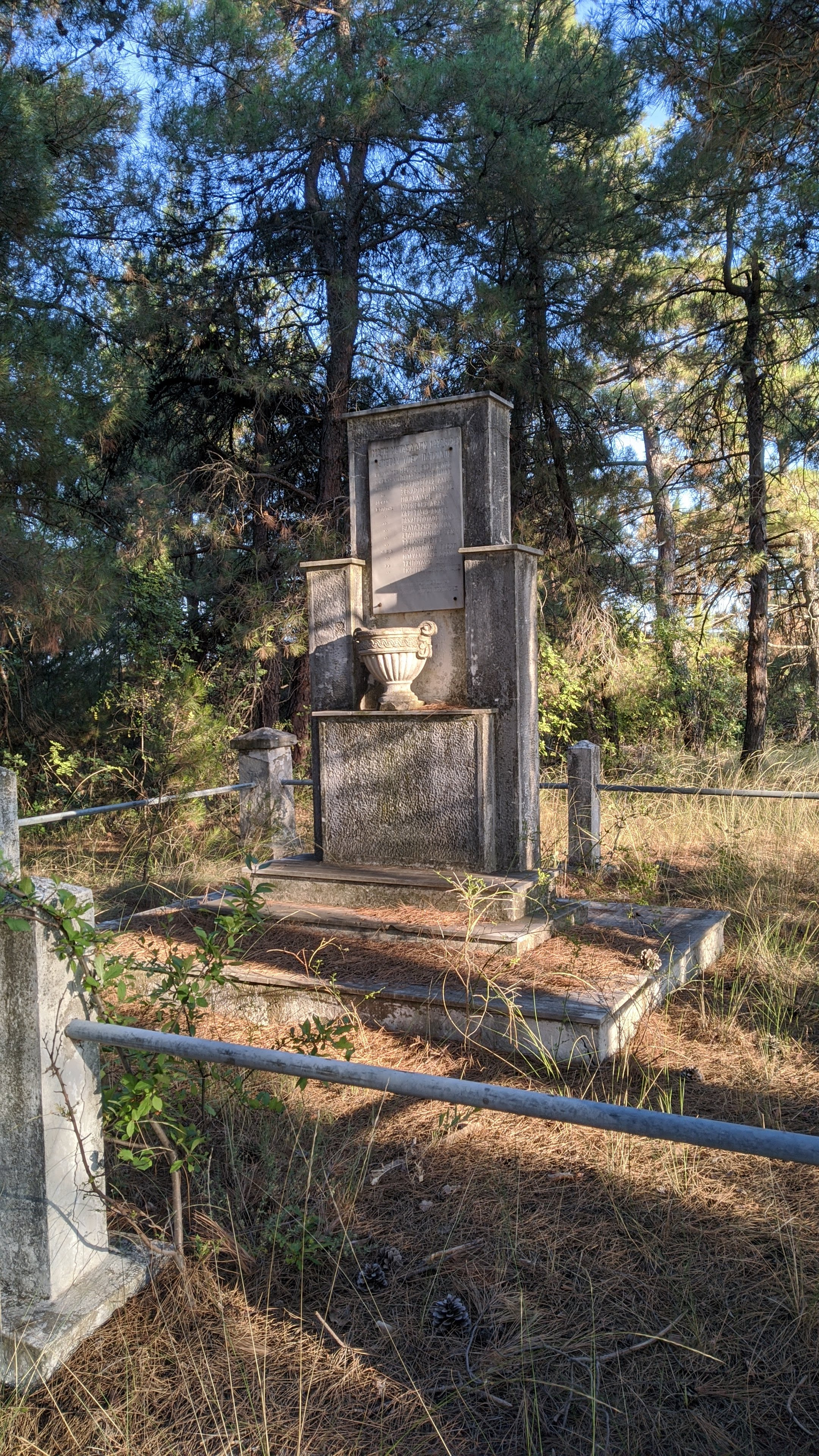
Heroon of the fallen of the Battle of Metaxades

In this brilliant success, the residents of the village of Metaxades contributed significantly, many of whom, mainly women and children, were found within the stronghold at the time of the attack, as well as the residents of the neighboring villages who rushed to reinforce the national forces. During the three-day battle, acts of such bravery and self-sacrifice were noted not only by the soldiers but also by the civilians—men, women, and children—who were within the stronghold. Many of the citizens took up arms and fought bravely alongside the soldiers, while others, young people and girls, women and children, helped the fighters in various ways, carrying ammunition, digging trenches, and performing any other tasks.

— General Theodoros Grigoropoulos, "From the Hilltop: Memories and Reflections"

The Battle of Metaxades was a significant battle during the Greek Civil War (1946–1949) that took place in the village of Metaxades, Evros from 15 to 20 May 1949. It was fought between the Hellenic Army and the Democratic Army of Greece (DSE) in the area between the two hills of the village. This battle marked the last attempt of the DSE to operate outside the fortified complexes in Grammos and Vitsi. It was the largest and last major and bloody battle in the Evros prefecture.

About a week before, the surrounding area had been occupied by the guerrillas, and thus the inhabitants of the villages of Paliouri, Polia, Avdella, and Alepochori had settled in Metaxades. The soldiers knew about the guerrilla attack and did not let the farmers go to their fields. As part of their operational plan, the guerrillas launched an assault on the morning of Sunday 15 May, targeting the Metaxades outpost and concurrently striking the local garrison with significant force. The inhabitants of Metaxades, unified in spirit and demonstrating exceptional moral and physical resilience, managed to support and reinforce the garrison despite the dangers involved. The panicked villagers ran to hide in the surrounding hills, where there were many bunkers (fortified hideouts made of earth). Each bunker could hold 15 to 20 people.

Greek Army reinforcements began arriving on the second day, increasing pressure on the guerrillas. On the third day, the participation of Greek Army tanks, armored vehicles, and artillery rendered the situation extremely difficult for the guerrillas.

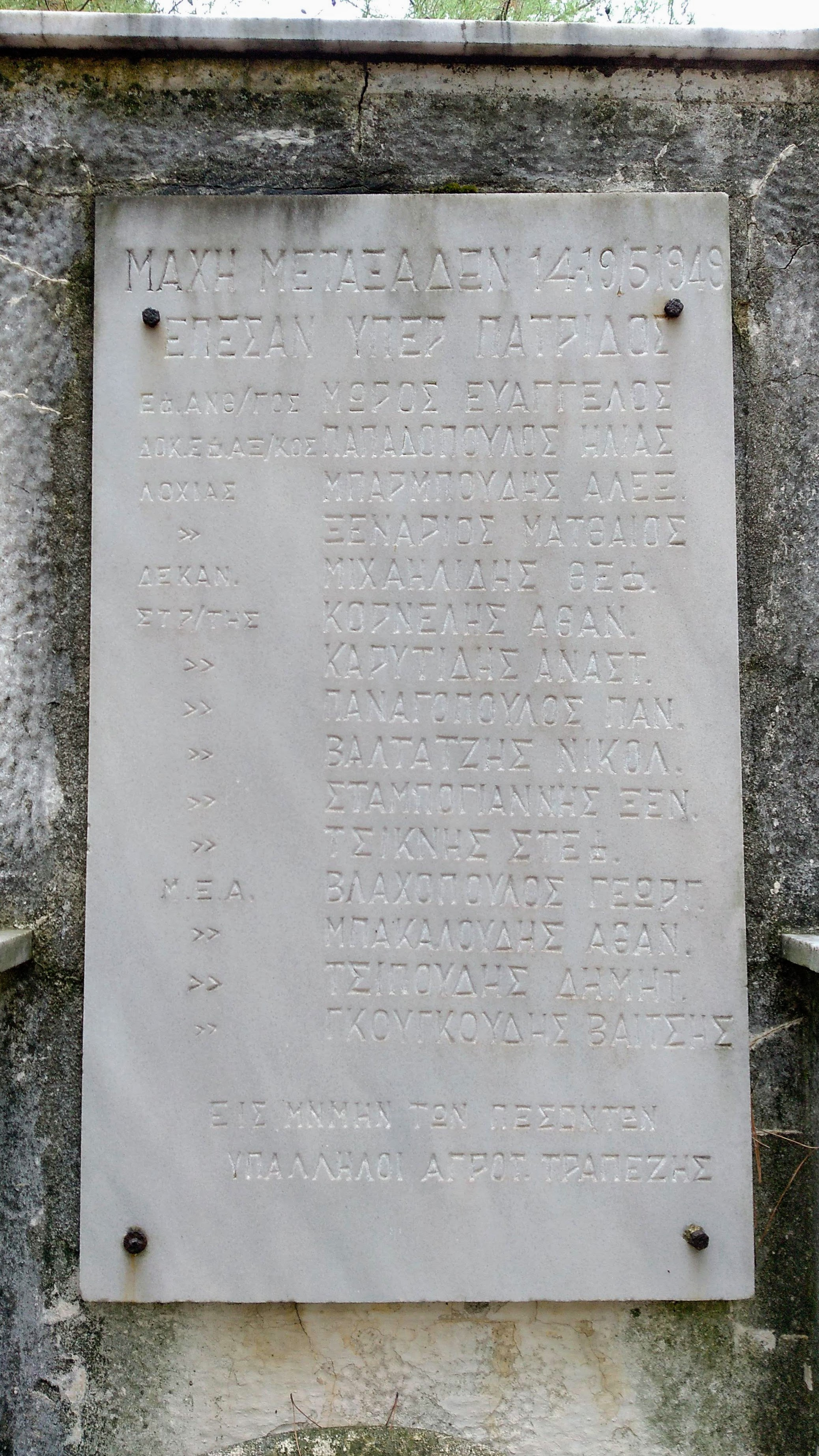
The marble sign on the Heroon of the Battle of Metaxades, with the names of the Fallen

The hill of Metaxades, guarded by Lieutenant Lazos and a detachment of militiamen, was one of the most important in Evros. A small army was also stationed at Asvestaria, as it was called then, but it quickly fell into the hands of the guerrillas. For three days and nights, the guerrillas tried to capture the hill. However, the army, with the help of the inhabitants who had hidden in the bunkers, repelled them. The army used mortars and machine guns, unlike the guerrillas, who possessed low-power mortars they did not know how to handle properly. Supplying the fort with ammunition and food was difficult because the siege was suffocating. The planes that flew over the hill for this purpose often accidentally dropped supplies on guerrilla positions. Many wanted to leave the hill, but Lieutenant Lazos did not allow it, as he was ordered to protect the fortress of Metaxades at all costs and not let it fall into guerrilla hands. He sent a message for help. The army base was in Protokklisi, from where two captains were sent to reinforce the fort. Access was very difficult due to mines placed in all the passages. Nevertheless, they broke the siege and entered the battle with a brigade from Ladi and thus managed to defeat the guerrillas.

During the battle, the guerrilla attack on the fortifications where approximately 900 to 1,000 civilians were confined posed a serious risk to their lives and physical safety. This tragic situation illustrates the plight of the villagers trapped between the opposing forces.

On 19 May, communist insurgents launched an attack on the border village, prompting a sustained counteroffensive by national units that continued throughout the night and into the following morning. The guerrillas, suffering heavy casualties, retreated in disarray toward the Bulgarian frontier. Although complete figures were not immediately available because of the ongoing pursuit, government units reported the discovery of four guerrilla corpses along the retreat path, the capture of seventeen communist fighters, and the seizure of substantial weaponry, including two heavy mortars and two machine guns. According to the official communiqué of the General Staff of the Armed Forces, the battle in the Metaxades–Didymoteicho sector resulted in four government soldiers killed and twenty-two wounded, while communist losses amounted to sixty-six dead and nineteen captured. Concurrently, the Royal Hellenic Air Force conducted aerial bombardments and rocket attacks against entrenched guerrilla positions in the Metaxades area, as part of broader air operations across Northern Greece.

On 20 May, the last battle took place, where the guerrillas surrendered. Most took refuge in ravines, where they were killed by airstrikes.

The battle lasted six days. Because of the carelessness of a guerrilla fighter who fired prematurely, the Greek Army detected their presence and prevented villagers from leaving the fortifications, thus thwarting the initial plan. The guerrilla assault on the fortifications endangered the 800–1,000 villagers held inside.

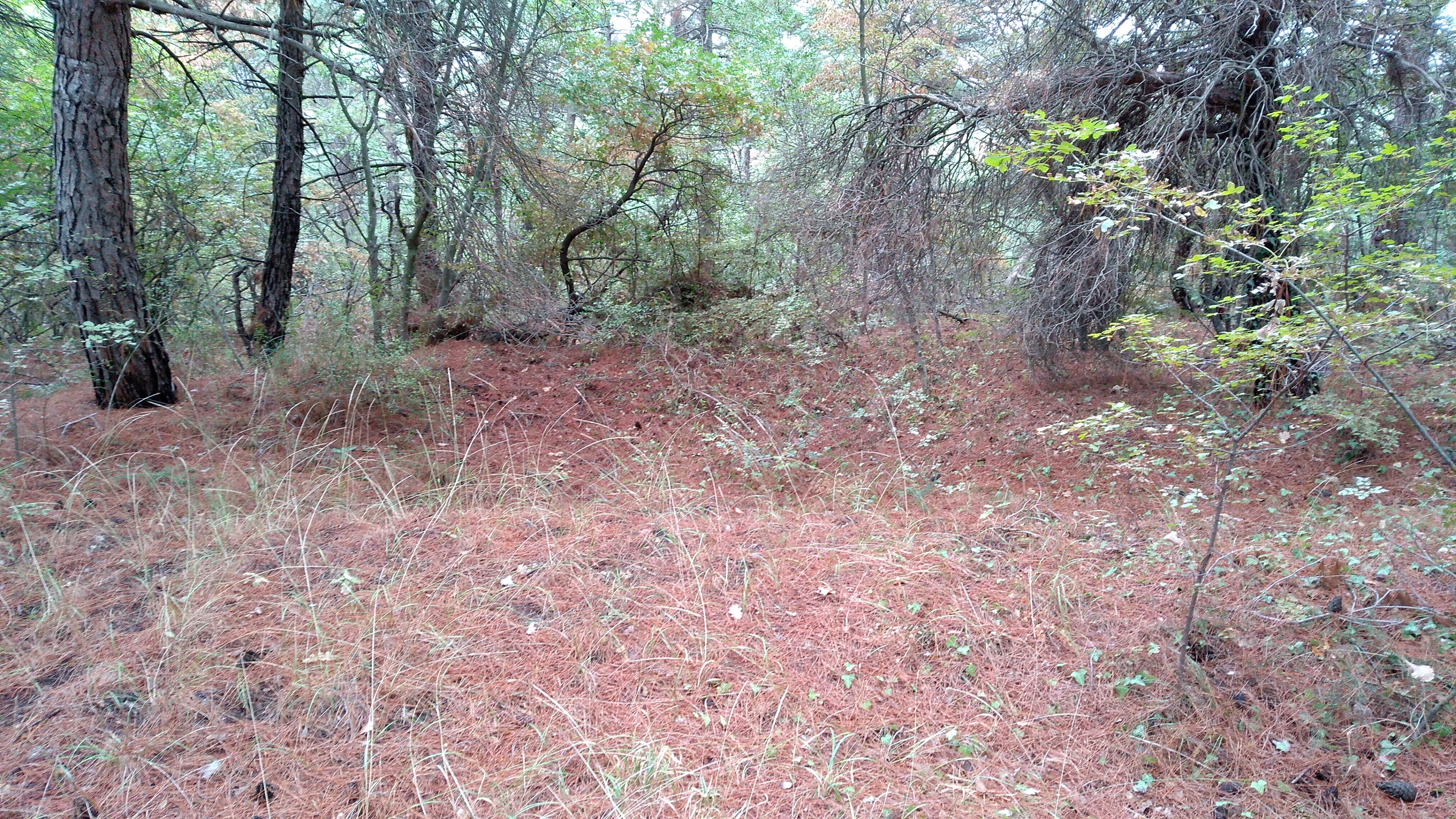
The ground of the hill where the Battle of Metaxades took place, with trenches of the battle still existing to this day

Despite efforts, the destruction of the fortifications and the elimination or capture of the Greek Army were not achieved, mainly due to the guerrillas' lack of heavy weaponry such as artillery and bazookas.

The battle ended in a decisive defeat for the guerrilla forces, who lost approximately two-thirds of their strength (from 1,378 fighters down to 420–450 survivors). The author cites surviving guerrillas, unit officers, and the local population of Evros, particularly from villages around Metaxades, as witnesses to the disaster.

Verified guerrilla casualties included 135 killed and 75 captured or wounded. Among these, 10 seriously wounded guerrillas were taken prisoner, while 72 wounded were evacuated by the retreating forces into Bulgaria. A considerable quantity of war materiel fell into government hands, including many portable and light weapons, ammunition, and additional military equipment.

The defeat had a serious impact on local guerrilla morale, particularly those in the surrounding villages of the Metaxades area. The villagers expressed their frustration and anger toward the guerrillas, blaming them for the "unjust slaughter of our children." This reaction reflects the deep divisions and pain caused by the civil war within the local communities, including those of Metaxades. The side of the Greek Army celebrated their victory in Metaxades for a week with parades, demonstrations, and speeches.

The Democratic Army of Greece (DSE) leadership attempted to portray the defeat as a "historic success", manipulating casualty figures. Responsibility for the failure was attributed by some officers to commanders Cheimaros, Maltezos, G. Messinezis, and Takis Petkidis.

Mimis Zachariadis, during his interrogation, referred to the Battle of Metaxades and the role of the wireless operator Miltiadis Pavlidis (Morse) from Metaxades, who maintained communication with "Megas Alexandros" (Kritonas).

After a brief period of inactivity and the rapid redeployment of military units and activation of local Auxiliary Security Forces, the guerrilla forces, having sustained heavy casualties, withdrew into Bulgarian territory following six days of severe combat. Subsequent reports confirmed that the pursuit of the remaining members of the attacking guerrilla group was still ongoing.

Verified guerrilla casualties included 135 killed and 75 captured or wounded. Among these, 10 seriously wounded guerrillas were taken prisoner, while 72 wounded were evacuated by the retreating forces into Bulgaria. A considerable quantity of war materiel fell into government hands, including many portable and light weapons, ammunition, and additional military equipment.

According to an official statement, the village of Metaxades was awarded the War Cross in recognition of its defense.

=== Post-war period ===
==== Aftermath of the Battle of Metaxades ====
Those who survived left Greece, followed by their families and other villagers who helped them escape the army's retaliation. Slowly, people began to return to the village to find many houses burned, families torn apart, and property destroyed by both the guerrillas and the army. Over time, the wounds healed, and they returned to their work and previous lives. However, the hatred and discord, fruits of the civil war, continued for years. Today, the bunkers on the hill and the well-known march remain as reminders of those dark years:

"In the inaccessible mountains of our Thrace, where glory reigns, in Metaxades up there, freedom has its throne".

After the Battle and the Civil War, up until the final days of the Cold War, it was common in Metaxades and Greece in general for individuals suspected of holding leftist or communist beliefs to face social and economic exclusion, often under pressure from both local authorities and community influencers. People were warned not to associate or do business with those labeled as "dangerous communists", leading to professional and personal isolation. This atmosphere of fear and political discrimination reflected broader tensions in post-junta Greece, where ideological divisions still deeply affected daily life in rural areas.

===== Discoveries of the local reconnaissance =====
Five days after the end of the Battle, on 25 May 1949, army units conducting reconnaissance across the battlefields of the recent clashes during the Battle of Metaxades discovered an additional 16 bodies of communist insurgents, along with a mass grave. A further 23 insurgents were captured. Thus, the total losses of the communist forces during the attempted attack against Metaxades have now risen to 175 killed and 167 captured or surrendered. 72 wounded insurgents had earlier been evacuated to Bulgarian territory.

Additional materiel recovered includes 35 rifles, 2 machine guns, 1 mortar, and thousands of cartridges. The cumulative spoils of the engagements now consist of the following:

- 4 mortars
- 14 machine guns
- 4 submachine guns
- 2 pistols
- 87 rifles
- Quantities of mines, hand grenades, mortar shells, and a large volume of assorted military equipment.

In the area under the jurisdiction of the III Army Corps, 21 insurgents surrendered on the same day. Additionally, the Hellenic Royal Air Force launched a surprise attack on a gathering of insurgents in the Belles region (between the Metaxades village and the border with Bulgaria at the river), targeting them with rockets and machine gun fire while they were receiving rations, reportedly inflicting heavy losses.

===== Disapproval of the local residents towards the captured guerrillas =====
On the afternoon of the same day as the reconnaissance, on 25 May, according to a news report, news spread through Alexandroupoli that the Didymoteicho-Alexandroupoli train would be transporting captured communist insurgents taken prisoner during the Battle of Metaxades. Crowds of citizens gathered en masse along Vasileos Georgiou Avenue in Didymoteicho and the surrounding area of the railway station to witness the arrival.

At 16:00, the train arrived, and the detainees were disembarked in groups of four and escorted to military headquarters. Thousands watched as the prisoners, described as "naked", "filthy", and "barefoot", attempted to cover their faces, apparently to avoid recognition by locals. The scene reportedly drew particular attention to the women among the captives, whose disheveled appearance was likened to "women of the jungle" in its wildness. According to accounts, many of the prisoners expressed regret, acknowledging that their attack on Metaxades had come at a heavy cost.

===== Local celebrations, memorials and official visits =====
On 31 May 1949, The Prefect of Evros, Patsoprakis, together with the members of Parliament for Evros, Tiris, Mitropoulos, and Kougioumtzoglou, as well as the sub-prefect and mayor of Didymoteicho, the heads of public services of the prefecture, and delegations from the Gendarmerie of Didymoteicho, paid a visit yesterday morning to the garrison of the village of Metaxades.

The enthusiasm of the garrison and the local residents was described, according to the newspaper Empros, as overwhelming. Following a thanksgiving serviceheld at the fortification, brief speeches were delivered by the prefect, the mayor, the members of parliament, and the accompanying Archimandrite.

On this occasion, the commanding officer, Colonel Vlassis, awarded badges of honor/medals to those who had distinguished themselves during the clashes.

On 16 November 1949, on the hill of the village of Metaxades, where the Battle of Metaxades between the army and the villagers against the guerrillas took place, a commemorative monument was unveiled. The monument was erected by the employees of the Agricultural Bank of Didymoteicho. Additionally, a ceremonial flag handover to the local military unit was conducted by the Friends of the Army.

===== Continued clashes after the Battle of Metaxades =====
====== 1949 ======
On 21 May, one day after the end of the Battle of Metaxades, clashes occurred in the border region of Metaxades between government forces and communist insurgents. The communist forces ultimately retreated into Bulgarian territory. Casualties reported for the previous day include two dead and eight wounded on the government side, while the communist forces suffered 28 dead and 16 captured.

On 6 June, In the Komotini area, Greek Army forces attacked remnants of guerrilla units that had retreated westward from Metaxades. Intense skirmishes occurred throughout the day before yesterday. The guerrilla forces were overcome and fled in disorder, suffering heavy losses. The guerrillas ultimately succeeded in crossing into Bulgarian territory.

On 9 June, in the Echinos area, a military unit attacked a group of guerrillas who had participated in the recent assault against the village of Metaxades. During the ensuing battle, the guerrillas were forced to retreat, leaving behind 5 dead, 5 wounded, and 11 captured or surrendered. A quantity of weapons and abundant ammunition was recovered.

On 20 December, harassment attempts by communist guerrillas were repelled in the area at the Erythropotamos bridge between Polia and Metaxades.

====== 1951 ======
On 27 April 1951, the Greek Army and small guerrilla forces clashed in the region of Metaxades.

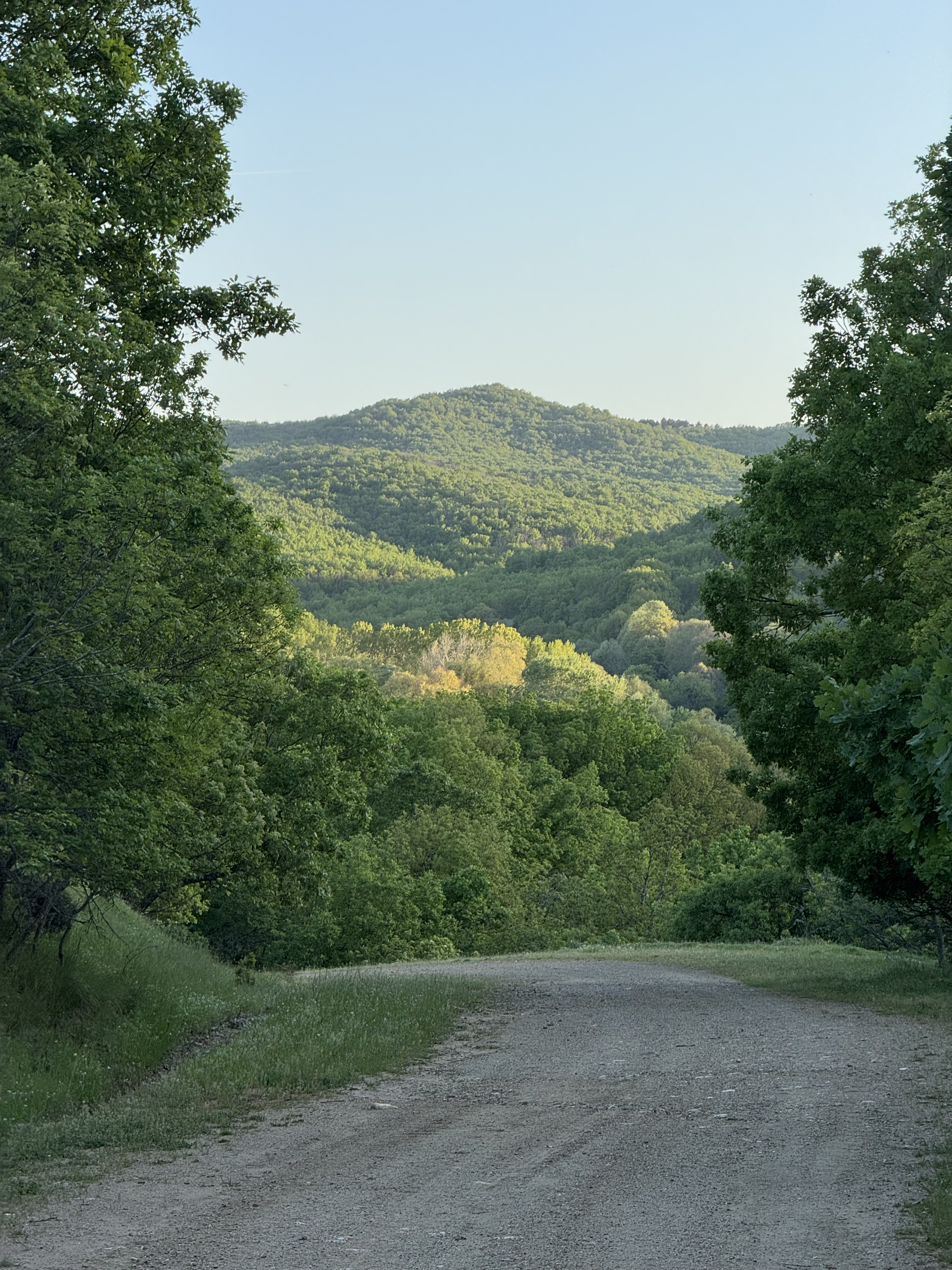
The surrounding hills where the Battle of Metaxades took place. Landmines were found years after the battle and often detonated by accident.

===== Accidental landmine detonations =====
After the war ended, many landmines were missed during clearing operations and remained hidden for years, eventually detonating when people, animals, or vehicles accidentally approached them. One such tragic incident occurred on the morning of 13 December 1966, just outside the village of Metaxades. The explosion resulted in one death and two serious injuries, one of them critical.

The three victims, Georgios Mantzidis, Georgios Polyzoudis (a rural guard), and Athanasios Polyzoudis, all residents of Metaxades, were traveling to a wooded area to collect firewood on a farm tractor. Shortly after setting off, and having traveled approximately 500 meters, the tractor struck a landmine that had apparently remained buried since the Battle of Metaxades. The explosion violently threw the vehicle into the air, completely destroying it.

Georgios Polyzoudis was killed instantly, while the other two men were seriously injured. Athanasios Polyzoudis was reported to be in critical condition.

==== Visits of Queen Frederica and Princess Sophia ====
On 11 August 1952, Queen Frederica and Princess Sophia disembarked from the destroyer "Navarino" at the port of Alexandroupoli, aiming to tour various areas of the Evros prefecture. Traveling by car from Didymoteicho, they arrived in Metaxades in the morning. They passed by the fortified hill where the Battle of Metaxades took place, and they laid a wreath in honor of those who fought. They then descended to the village square, where traditional national dances were performed in their presence. Eventually, they visited the village's "House of the Child".

In 1955, Queen Frederica visited the village again, similarly to before.

==== House of the Child ====
House of the Child was the name of the institutions created in 1950–1955 by the Royal Welfare Foundation of Greece under the personal care of Queen Frederica for the care of children in 260 villages of Northern Greece.

On 28 October 1952, during the festivities in Metaxades, the entire village gathered at the House of the Child to observe the celebration. However, due to the overwhelming crowd, the spacious performance hall of the House of the Child was unable to accommodate everyone, despite efforts by the police to manage the situation. The event continued successfully, leaving a positive impression, particularly with the girls on stage dressed in traditional local attire. Appreciation was extended to the teaching staff of the Primary School for their contributions to organizing the event.

On 9 November, the Houses of the Child from Ellinochori, Mani, and Metaxades visited the Pythio Bridge outpost, where they also presented a specially prepared flag for the outpost's use.

=== Recent history ===
Until the 1970s, access to the villages of Metaxades and the Municipality of Trigono was difficult without a permit, especially from the two exit gates of Didymoteicho, where there were military outposts. As it was reported by locals at the time, "For us, it was difficult to manage back then. We had to have a permit to go to our fields, even though we lived here".

==== Transfer of Community Radio Project to Greek Government ====
On 18 August 1954, the Governments of the United States and Greece signed an agreement in Athens to transfer the Community Radio Project to the Greek Government. This transfer included radio sets, accessory equipment, and spare parts that had previously been allocated on loan to various Greek communities. The agreement was driven by the United States' desire to transfer ownership and maintenance responsibilities to Greece, while Greece aimed to enhance its telecommunications infrastructure. The transfer was made without monetary consideration and aimed to support the development of local communities by ensuring continued access to radio equipment for public use.

Specifically, Metaxades had a ECA Lorenz radio, identified by the property number ECA/7012/DA.

==== Fever outbreak of 1957 ====
In early November 1957, it was announced that cases of "aphthous fever" appeared in villages of the Didymoteicho prefecture, as well as in Metaxades and Avdella. By ministerial decision, a resolution by the Didymoteicho district was approved, declaring the villages of Metaxades, Avdella, and Ellinochori as infected with aphthous fever. Accordingly, the entry and exit of small and large ruminants and swine, whether alive or slaughtered, as well as animal products, hay, and straw, were prohibited.

==== Major developments in the region ====
===== Sesame oil mill =====
In January 1959, the Minister of Northern Greece, Mr. Theologitis, signed various decisions granting customs duty exemptions to several industries in Northern Greece, in accordance with the law on the protection of regional industry. One of the issued decisions, was the establishment of a sesame oil mill in Metaxades.

===== Electrification of the region =====
In January 1961, the Central Union of Municipalities and Communities of Greece has proposed the electrification of border villages in the Evros region. In an official letter to the Public Power Corporation (ΔΕΗ), the Union requested that the company undertake the electrification of several communities in the prefecture, including Metaxades.

In August 1964, according to the program announced by the Minister of Industry, Mr. Zigdis, regarding the "Electrification of Rural Areas," it was announced that Metaxades would be electrified by the end of 1965.

In March 1965, it was reported that the construction of the Metaxades network is ongoing. In November 1965, the installation of lighting fixtures commenced.

Finally, on Wednesday 13 December 1965, the Public Power Corporation (Δ.Ε.Η.) energized the Medium Voltage (MV) and Low Voltage (LV) networks of Metaxades and several other additional villages in the Prefecture of Evros, bringing electricity into the region for the first time.

From that day onward, the Public Power Corporation (Δ.Ε.Η.) issued important safety notices to the local population, warning that any attempt to approach these power lines or remove components from the poles is extremely dangerous to life. Particularly at risk are individuals who climb the poles, tether animals to them, or inadvertently cause short circuits or disconnections of conductors through negligence or the use of firearms. Residents living near these lines were strongly urged to report any observed irregularities or faults to the nearest police authority or the offices of the Public Power Corporation (Δ.Ε.Η).

===== Construction of the new Erythropotamos bridge =====
In January 1960, the bridge on the Metaxades–Polia road was found to be in a dangerously dilapidated condition. If it were not repaired, transportation between the aforementioned villages would be interrupted.

Based on the approved program of April 1965, the immediate construction of the Metaxades bridge had been decided.

The construction of the Erythropotamos bridge was undertaken by A.T.E Domiki, a construction company active in infrastructure projects. The project officially began on October 1, 1965, and was completed by March 15, 1966.

===== Construction of the Didymoteicho-Metaxades road =====
In September 1953, funds were made available for the construction of the Didymoteicho–Metaxades road, covering a total area of 118,703 square meters. In 1964, it was signed via a joint decision between the ministers at the time.

===== Construction of the water system =====
For many years, the inhabitants of Metaxades faced a serious water shortage, as the village relied on a single spring for its water supply. During the summer months, this hardship was particularly severe, as residents, both young and old, often spent the evenings at the spring, where frequent disputes arise over access and priority.

In March 1966, it was decided to provide supplementary funding for the water supply project in Metaxades and to donate the unused supplies and tools from the resettlement program to the farmers of border settlements.

In July 1976, the president of the community of Metaxades announced a public tender for the project "Installation of 500 water meters" in the village of Metaxades, with a projected cost of 400,000 drachmas.

In February 1979, the president of the community of Metaxades announced a public open-bid tender for the execution of the project titled "Sewerage Works of the Community of Metaxades," with a total projected cost of 1,500,000 drachmas.

===== Small-scale public works =====
In the 1960s and 70s, multiple different small scare services were established in the village, such as a veterinarian office, a slaughterhouse, a dairy products factory and more.

===== Establishment of the Post Office =====
In August 1964, the Deputy Minister of Transport, Mr. Arvanitakis, following the observation that the northern regions, and especially the border areas, have been entirely neglected in terms of postal service provision, announced his decision for the immediate establishment of a new postal office in Metaxades, among 7 other villages.

On 26 August 1966, the new Postal Service office was established, which continues to function to this day.

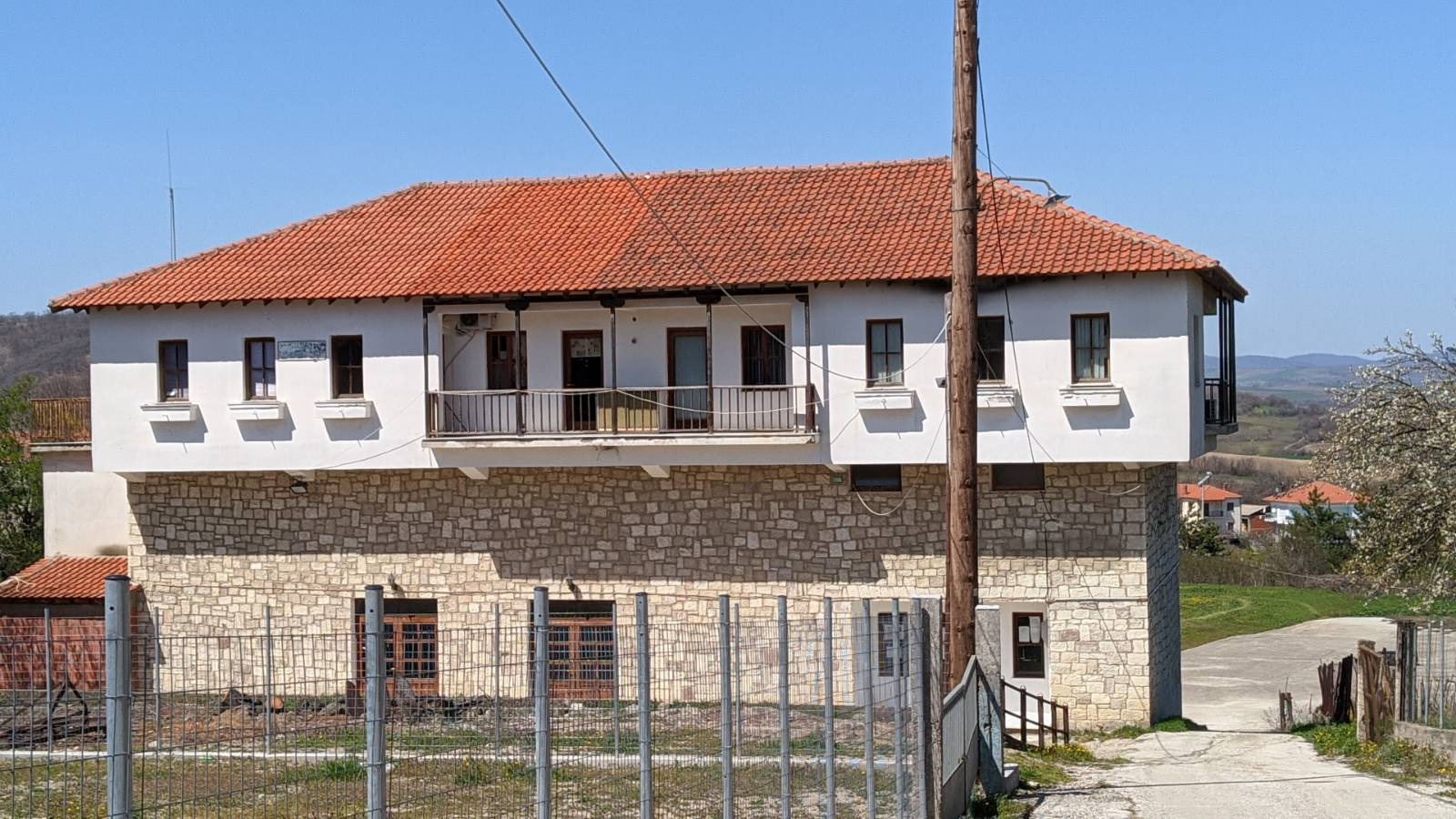
The building that houses the Community Center of Metaxades

===== Construction of the Community Center of Metaxades =====
The construction of the Community Center in Metaxades was initiated in 1978–1980, as part of the broader Evros Development Project, which was designed to supplement the Greek Government's investment program in the Evros Prefecture. This area, known for having an investment rate more than twice the national average, was targeted for development to reduce regional inequalities and improve living conditions.

Following the ratification of the loan agreement by the Greek Parliament and its publication in the Government gazette, significant steps were taken to implement the project. The Evros Office was established in Alexandroupolis, along with the Evros Regional and Central Coordination Committees and the Secretariat of the BCCC. These bodies were responsible for organizing and administering the project.

In Metaxades, the construction of the Community Center was a key development. This initiative was part of a larger effort that included the building of community centers in other towns such as Alexandroupolis, Soufli, Dikaia, Kastanies, and Feres. The focus on community centers was driven by the need to enhance social infrastructure, which, although difficult to quantify, was expected to bring substantial benefits to the local population.

By the time the project is completed, the various programs, including the construction of community centers, are expected to significantly improve living conditions in Metaxades and the wider Evros region. This development is part of a comprehensive plan that also includes road construction, reforestation, and improvements in water supply and rural infrastructure. The overall goal is to address the specific needs of the Evros Prefecture, thereby fostering regional development and economic growth.

===== Construction of the Erythropotamos river bank =====
In January 1972, ministerial decisions declared the compulsory expropriation of certain land areas for reasons of public benefit. Specifically, 16,775 square meters were designated for expropriation to allow for the construction of the left embankment of the Erythropotamos River, in the Polia–Metaxades area.

In September 1975, a study was submitted for approval and for the allocation of the relevant funding for the construction of embankments.

===== Introduction of the landline phone =====
In early 1972, the Hellenic Telecommunications Organisation (OTE) activated automatic semi-urban telephone exchanges in Metaxades with an initial capacity of 100 lines.

===== Establishment of high school classes =====
In 1983–84, the Metaxades High School Annex of the 1st High School of Didymoteicho was established, with the first class consisting of graduates from the Metaxades Gymnasium. In 1984–85, the second high school class was created, and in 1985–86, the third high school class. In February 1986, with Law 1566/85, the school took its current form as a gymnasium with three high school classes.

===== Tapestry School of Metaxades =====
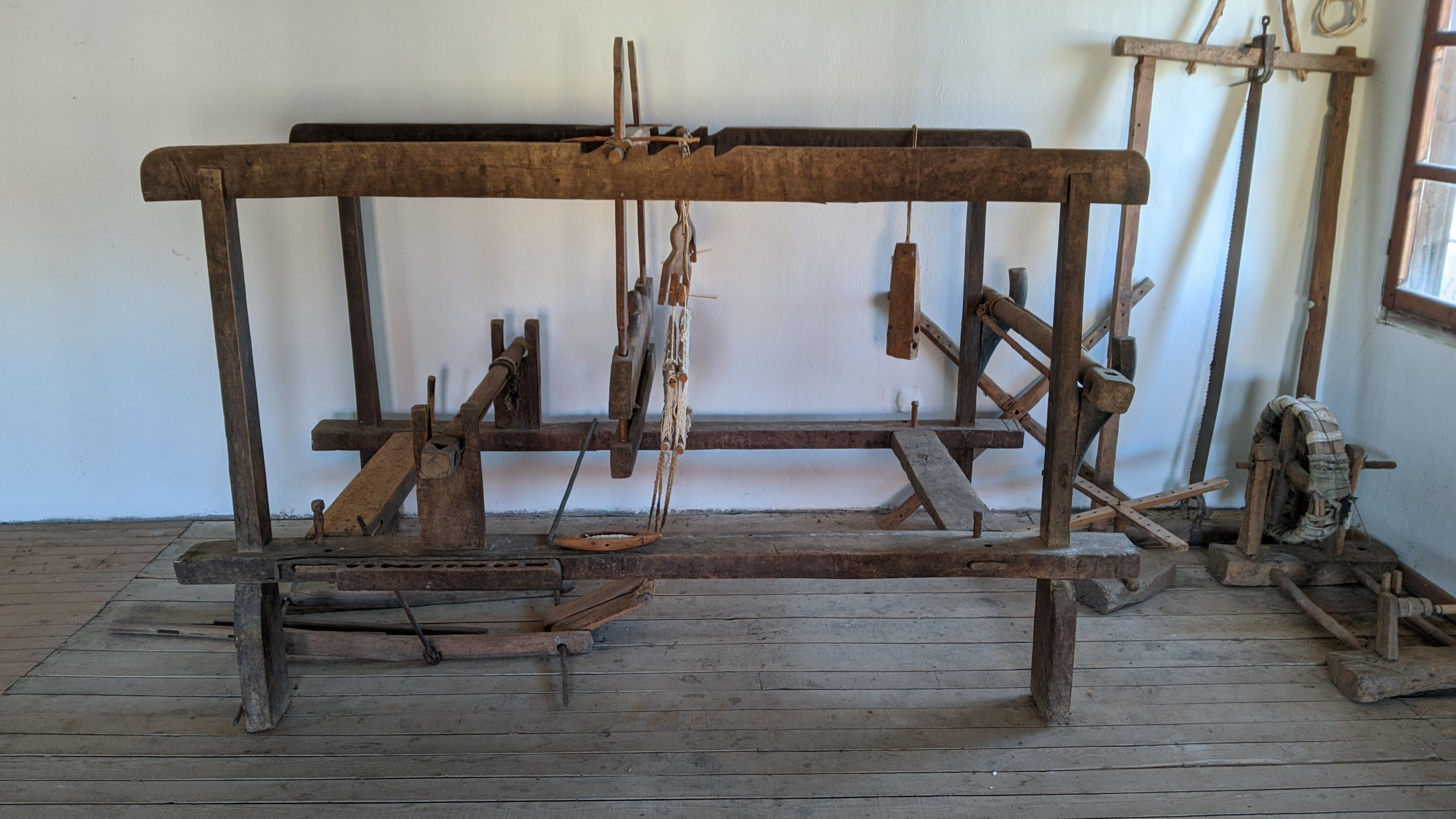
Traditional loom in Metaxades

The Tapestry School in Metaxades operated until the early 2000s and was a notable center for traditional craftsmanship. The school housed 14 traditional looms, many of which displayed carpets at various stages of completion. These carpets, made from sheep's wool, were distinguished by their intricate designs, vibrant colors, and meticulous craftsmanship. The production process was labor-intensive, requiring significant time and skill to create each piece, allowing visitors to purchase handmade carpets of exceptional quality.

===== Remvi Complex =====
The "Remvi" hotel café-bar was constructed in 2001 as part of efforts to boost tourism in the border area of Metaxades. The hotel was located in a multilevel space on a hill, offering views of the fields of Evros and serving as a starting point for excursions in the region. The "Remvi" hotel consisted of six double rooms designed for comfort and accessibility, meeting European Union standards for people with disabilities. Each room included a direct dial telephone, color TV, 24-hour hot water supply, individual heating for winter months, and a fully equipped kitchen.

In the summer of 2004, the club "Remvi" was added to the "Remvi" building complex. The venue offered music, a variety of drinks, and views of the sunrise from the edge of a pinewood. The café-bar at the "Remvi" hotel opened early in the morning and served a range of refreshments, including hot and cold coffee, drinks, and cocktails throughout the day and night. It was noted for its service, environment, decoration, views, and the scents of the Greek countryside.

Despite its initial success and reputation as a hospitable location in Evros, the "Remvi" complex was closed in 2023.

===== Development in the nightlife sector =====
From the 1980s to 2010, the village experienced significant development in the nightlife sector. Numerous nightclubs and discos, as well as internet cafes and other entertainment businesses, were established. This made the village a popular meeting point for the youth of the northern Evros region.

However, the Greek economic crisis that began in 2010 had a negative impact on the nightlife sector. The migration of young people to major cities or abroad led to a shrinking youth population in the village, resulting in the closure of most entertainment businesses.

Attempts have been made to reopen certain businesses, but they have been unsuccessful due to a lack of interest and a declining population.

==== Designation as traditional settlement ====
Metaxades has been designated as a traditional settlement by the Presidential Decree of October 19, 1978 (Government Gazette 594/D/November 13, 1978) and by the Evros Prefecture decision number I-4917/December 10, 1987 (Government Gazette 1277G/December 31, 1987), recognizing the settlement's distinctive architectural characteristics.

===== Opposition of residents against the designation =====
The community of Metaxades, a few months after the announcement of the designation of the village as a traditional settlement, expressed strong opposition to the classification of their village as a traditional settlement. The community submitted a formal document to the Ministry of Spatial Planning, Settlement, and Environment, specifically to the General Directorate of Settlement, outlining the problems arising from this designation.

The residents argued that the classification as a traditional village hindered the development and progress of Metaxades, a border village situated near Turkey and Bulgaria, where maintaining population was considered crucial. According to the community, the restrictions imposed by this status prevented new construction and improvements, forcing inhabitants to live in deteriorating buildings and obstructing the construction of essential structures such as storage facilities and animal shelters. This situation compelled some residents to live in inadequate conditions, including cohabiting with animals inside their homes.

Furthermore, the original architectural style of the village, stone-built, single or two-room houses with small windows typical of the Ottoman occupation, had largely disappeared. It was replaced by newer building styles adapted to modern needs, using materials like concrete and bricks. The community noted that these modern adaptations were not permitted under the traditional settlement regulations, creating a conflict between heritage preservation and current living requirements.

The community also highlighted practical issues such as the absence of local administrative facilities for building permits, which had to be obtained from distant cities, complicating and delaying necessary construction approvals. Additionally, the lack of specialized craftsmen and the high cost of traditional materials further exacerbated the problem.

Residents reported that the constraints related to the traditional settlement status had led many, including workers returning from Germany, to abandon plans to build homes in Metaxades, opting instead to settle in larger urban centers. This trend contributed to depopulation and the gradual abandonment of the village.

Given these factors, the community requested the removal of the traditional village designation to allow for more flexible building regulations, promote development, and ensure better living conditions for its residents. They emphasized the urgent need for local autonomy in issuing construction permits and the necessity of adapting regulations to the current socio-economic realities of border areas like Metaxades.

==== Media attention ====
Since the 1990s, Metaxades has received increasing attention from local newspapers and travelers, which led to TV stations visiting the village to document its traditions, cuisine, music, history, and more.

ERT (Hellenic Broadcasting Corporation) has visited the village multiple times for various shows, with one of the most notable visits occurring in 1977. During this visit, Domna Samiou documented the local traditions and music for the show Musical Journey with Domna Samiou, a series of programs broadcast on ERT between 1976 and 1977.

Another popular visit by ERT took place on 5 February 2006, when the show Kiriaki sto Chorio (Sunday in the Village), hosted by Marni Chatziemmanouil, filmed an episode in the village Alepochori, containing multiple scenes in Metaxades, showcasing local traditions, customs, and food. The episode was broadcast nationwide and internationally through ET3 and ERT World. It featured traditional dances and was attended by various local associations.

On 13 May 2018, the TV show Apo Topo Se Topo (From Place to Place), hosted by Christos Mylonas, visited the village to film an episode. The episode showcased local traditions, customs, folk songs, and traditional food, which were broadcast nationwide and internationally via Vouli TV. It also featured traditional dances and was attended by various local associations.

In 2020, ENA Channel from Kavala visited the village twice, with Diogenes Charalampidis as the host, to document its current condition and interview locals about their lives and the challenges they face. Similarly, channel Delta TV from Alexandroupoli visited the village with the TV show Patirnti, hosted by Charalampidis, for the same purpose.

In December 2023, the regional channel Lydia, which is owned by 4E Channel and rebroadcasts its content, documented the village's Christmas traditions on the TV show Byzantine Melodies, hosted by Paris Gkounas.

Local songs and costumes from the area have been featured in multiple TV shows across various channels in recent years, and local but also international exhibitions have also showcased these traditional items.

===== 1st Interschool Festival of Student Creative Expression =====
On 24 April 2026, Metaxades hosted the 1st Interschool Festival of Student Creative Expression, organized under the theme "Building Peace - Living with Peace" («Χτίζουμε Ειρήνη-Ζούμε με Ειρήνη»). The initiative was co-organized by the Junior High School with Lyceum Classes of Metaxades, the 2nd Junior High School of Didymoteicho, and the Municipality of Didymoteicho, placed under the auspices of the Ministry of Digital Governance and Artificial Intelligence. The festival gathered 500 students and educators from 21 distinct school units across the Evros regional unit. The collaborative event featured a Digital Peace Museum and various artistic presentations aimed at promoting regional cooperation and non-violence. It was attended by notable political figures, including Member of the European Parliament Eleonora Meleti and Deputy Minister of Digital Governance Christos Dermentzopoulos.

==== Floods of 2021 ====
The village was significantly impacted by the severe floods in January and February 2021, experienced extensive damage due to the overflow of the Erythropotamos River. On 12 January, the fields around Metaxades began to flood as the river exceeded its embankments, causing widespread destruction to agricultural land and properties. The area recorded a substantial 203mm of precipitation in January alone, contributing to the flooding. Following the heavy rainfall and subsequent freezing temperatures, the flooded areas did not dry out, further exacerbating the situation. The broken embankments around Metaxades left the village vulnerable to future floods, restricting residents and farmers from accessing certain areas and causing significant disruption to daily life and agricultural activities.

== The Village Today ==
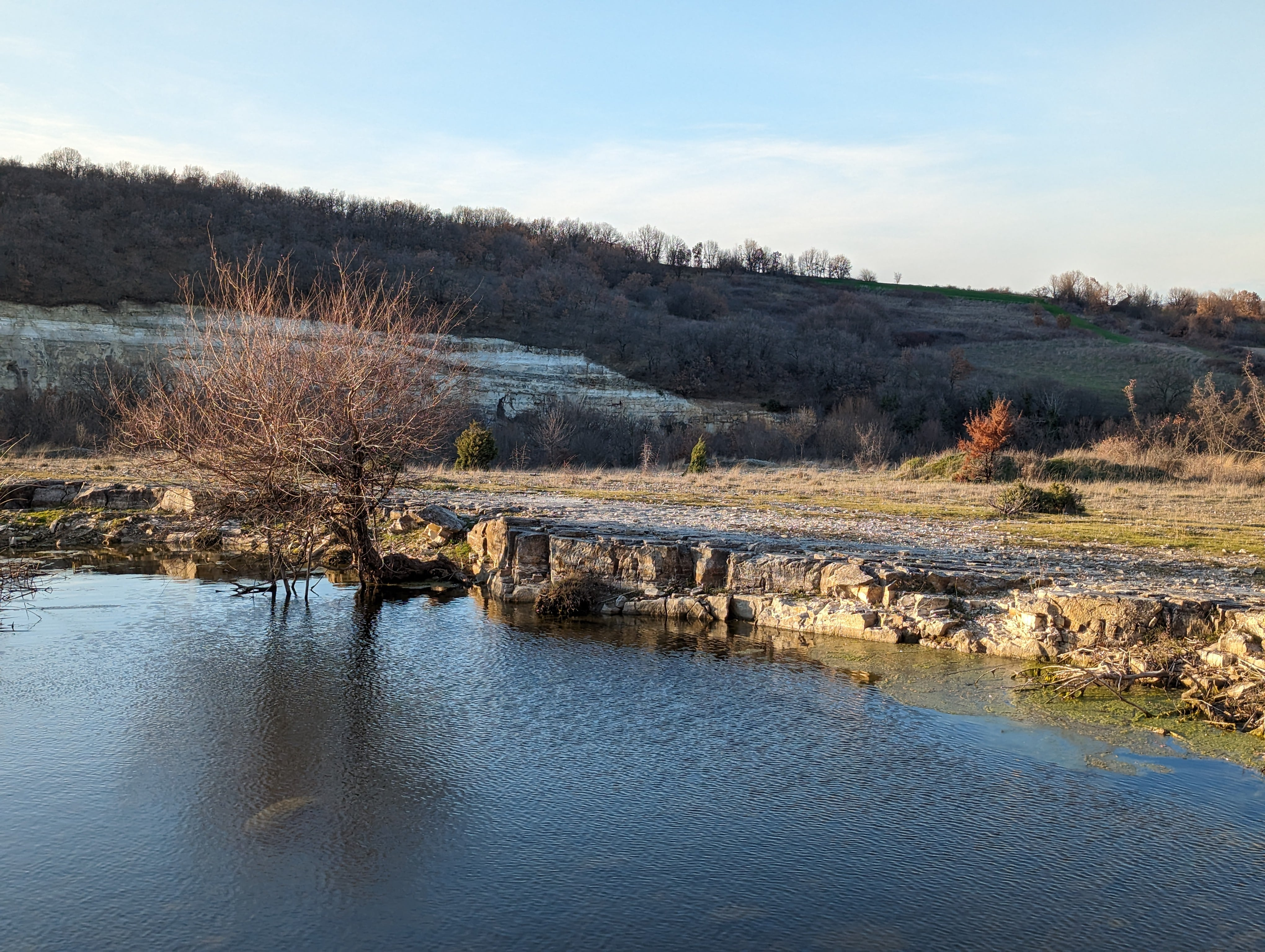
The area around the quarry of Metaxades

=== Inside and around the village ===
The eastern district is served by a functional peripheral asphalt road that connects to courtyards, cul-de-sacs, and the village square. This road extends to the post-Byzantine chapel of Saint Athanasius at the southeastern edge of the village and transitions into a dirt road leading south through a picturesque wooded landscape. This road meanders through labyrinthine forks to reach the village's northwestern entrance.

The northern part of Metaxades features several shops, a large school building, taverns, and cafés. It is also the site of the weekly Wednesday bazaar, a vibrant gathering that attracts people and goods from neighboring villages.

The surrounding road network connects Metaxades to other areas, including Erythropotamos, the plains' villages, Orestiada, Didymoteicho, and Soufli. One particularly scenic route leads through the forest of Mikro Dereio.

The central road originating from the small square of Profitis Ilias ascends through Metaxades in a south-southwest direction, leading to the village's central square, approximately 100 meters away. This square is a social hub, featuring the Town Hall, several cafés, and a few shops. Traditionally, it serves as a gathering place for the male population of Metaxades, where men meet to enjoy coffee, engage in conversation, and maintain daily social interactions. In contrast, the women of the village typically socialize in less visible areas, such as in front of their homes or within their yards, reflecting a cultural tradition that remains prevalent in rural Greek communities.

The houses surrounding the central square vary in style. While many are traditional, they do not always conform to the traditional stone-built architecture characteristic of Metaxades. Some structures, built with cost-efficiency in mind, deviate significantly from the village's architectural heritage, creating a noticeable contrast with the more authentic stone constructions.

Beyond the central square, Metaxades unfolds amphitheatrically from east to west, with a network of narrow yet accessible paved roads. At its highest point, the internal road connects with the western peripheral road, which traverses a vast oak forest and extends towards Mikro Dereio, the mountainous regions of the Rhodope range, Pomak villages, and Soufli. At the western edge of the village, the road branches southwest, ending about 200 meters further at the Remvi area, situated below the historically significant hill of "Ypsoma".

Approximately five kilometers from the starting point, a steep downhill branch of the road appears to the northwest. Continuing straight ahead instead of taking the branch, a hilltop structure resembling a ruined building becomes visible. The initially well-maintained dirt road gradually deteriorates into rough rural paths, winding through cultivated fields and oak forests. At this point, vehicles can no longer proceed, and the journey continues on foot. Crossing a sloping straw field, one reaches a narrow, overgrown path, indicative of long disuse. This path leads to the summit of the hill and ultimately to the ruins of an old Greek military outpost.

The outpost, now in disrepair, consists of half-collapsed walls with piles of stones scattered throughout the surrounding area and its interior. Remnants of the outpost's past, such as engraved initials on stone walls, broken bottles, and rusted cans, hint at the small community of soldiers once stationed there. Surrounding the outpost are overgrown trenches and battle positions, relics of its military function. A more recent addition is a concrete triangulation bollard installed by the Army Geographical Survey.

Despite the general state of ruin, an elevated lookout remains intact, offering a commanding view of the western and southwestern horizons. From this vantage point, one can see the neighboring Bulgarian countryside, characterized by a scenic valley flanked by oak-covered mountains and traversed by the Erythropotamos. In the valley's center, a small Bulgarian village is situated on a gentle slope, its reddish-brown brick houses standing out under the sunlight. However, the village appears abandoned, with no discernible human activity visible, even when observed through a telephoto lens. The picturesque location contrasts with the apparent desolation of the settlement.

=== Local jobs ===
Around 1940, the local economy relied heavily on agriculture, pottery, tailoring (including cloth dyeing), and charcoal production. Historically, the village was neither a tsiflik (estate) nor a vakouf (monastic holding), and land ownership was generally small-scale, an estate over 50 stremmas was considered large, owned by only 20–30 families.

Cultivation traditionally focused on wheat for self-consumption, while sesame, cotton, vegetables, and tobacco were grown for trade. Agricultural practices evolved over the decades, with canary seed introduced in 1960 and sugar beets in 1970, alongside the systematic cultivation of beans and cereals. Sericulture (silkworm farming) was also a common activity for many residents. Domestic livestock farming began around 1920, though a few Vlach families with herds settled nearby briefly around 1922. The village formerly supported a specialized craft of cart-makers known as arabatzides, who constructed ox-carts and wooden agricultural tools, though this profession has since ceased.

Livestock farming was the main occupation of the inhabitants. This resulted in overgrazing of the adjacent forest areas and the maintenance of shrubby forms of forest trees. Today, livestock farming has almost disappeared.

==== Today ====
The local jobs in the area include work in the primary sector, with the main occupations being agriculture and livestock farming, while forestry work is limited. The ecosystems in the surrounding area are degraded due to intensive use of resources. With the implementation of forest management plans for the forest areas, a gradual recovery of the forests is expected. The main occupation of the inhabitants is agriculture, while a small number are involved in forestry exploitation and very few are engaged in livestock farming. A large variety of species are cultivated in the area. Corn and cotton dominate the irrigated fields, while wheat, barley, and sunflower are prevalent in the dry fields.

=== Schools ===
According to historical accounts, the village of Metaxades had an educational institution operating prior to 1800. The establishment of a formal primary school with a structured curriculum dates back to 1870. The school's early years were marked by a single teacher, whose salary was financed by the local church. After the liberation of Thrace, the school resumed its operations. In 1920, it functioned as a three-seat school and expanded to a five-seat school by 1950. In the following year, it briefly operated as a four-seat school before undergoing significant reconstruction. However, its operation faced interruptions during periods of Bulgarian and German occupations. By 1962, the school had transitioned into a two-storey, six-seat institution, accommodating approximately 300 students, as recorded in its archives.

Today, Metaxades has a kindergarten, a primary school and a high school. The student body primarily consists of individuals from nearby villages, with a significant proportion belonging to the Rumelian Romani-speaking Muslim minority of Romani origin. Consequently, many students face challenges with the Greek language, making it difficult for them to fully engage in academic programs and lessons.

The remote location of the schools poses additional challenges for institutions tasked with providing information to teachers and students, as access is limited. The rural and isolated nature of the area also complicates access for parents, leading to limited opportunities for in-person communication.

During winter months, adverse weather conditions can further hinder accessibility, occasionally necessitating the use of tele-education to ensure continuity. These factors collectively create challenges for the teaching staff, who, despite their dedication, often find it difficult to fully support the school's initiatives. Nonetheless, the school's location in a natural setting allows students to connect with and appreciate their environment. Metaxades High School is a small institution, but it remains committed to achieving its goals despite the challenging conditions.

Many of the Romani students at the school belong to the Muslim community and are influenced by the associated cultural practices. As a result, some students, particularly girls, may leave school at a young age due to early marriage, often with the consent of their guardians. The school administration and teachers make efforts to encourage students to continue their education and at least complete the compulsory years, which can provide them with better opportunities in life. While these efforts are sometimes successful, there are also instances where students permanently leave the school environment.

Relationships between male and female students are largely very good. Children are friendly with each other, meet at break times and cooperate in class. There is mutual respect and solidarity between them. In difficulties they were are for each other. Also, on excursions and at the various school events they cooperate without any problems and help each other.

Moreover, as the school unit is attended by pupils from the Romani minority and there are children who do not know the Greek language well, there is cooperation between them to deal with problems. However, the Romani pupils usually hang out with each other, preferring to be together with people of their culture and language. Even as good as the relations between them are, there are cases of tensions, but these are dealt with in time with the intervention of the Director and the Teachers.

The school unit exhibits significant heterogeneity, with notable differences in mentality and language among the students, reflecting the diverse backgrounds of their families. Many school activities have seen active involvement and contributions from parents, and several parents have cooperated effectively with teachers to address various issues concerning the students.

However, there is also a significant lack of contact with the school among some parents. This may be due to language barriers, professional obligations, or personal beliefs. While some parents have been consistently disengaged, others have developed strong relationships with the school, often facilitated by the school social worker.

=== Sights ===
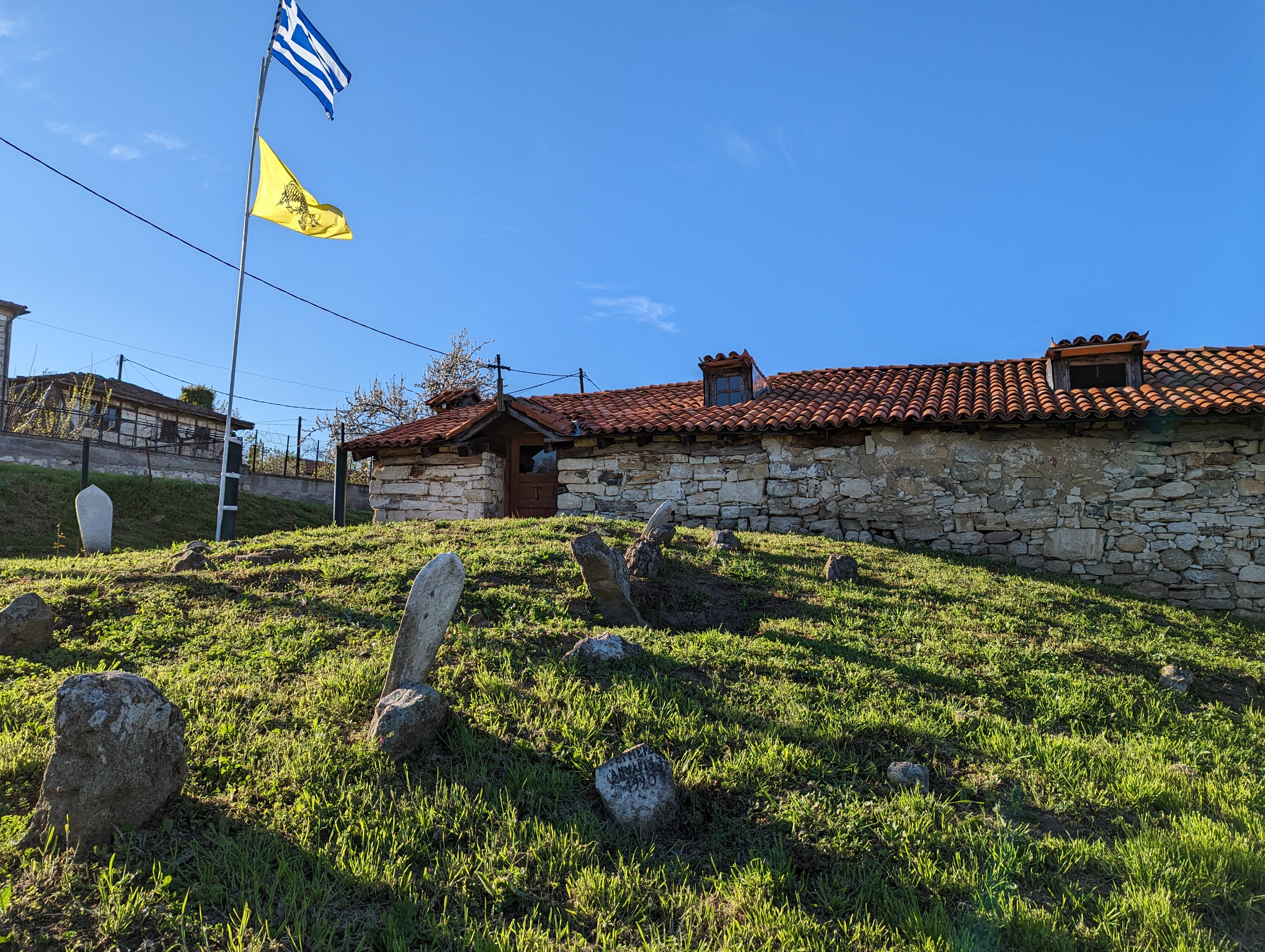
Post-Byzantine church of Saint Athanasius

==== Post-Byzantine Church of Saint Athanasius ====
The Church of Saint Athanasius is a cemetery church located on the outskirts of the modern settlement. It impresses with its humble architectural form from the dark times of the Ottoman occupation. It is an important religious monument for the local inhabitants, opening its doors twice a year on the feast day of Saint Athanasius. It is of the basilica type, constructed from local stones, with the architecture of the craftsmen of Metaxades. This architectural style can also be found in other churches in the Thrace region, where most of them are carved into the ground, protruding only as much as single-story houses of the same period, illuminated by skylights.

Specifically, the Church of Saint Athanasius in Metaxades is semi-underground, introverted, and no external feature reveals its use as a place of worship. It is a rectangular building into which visitors enter via a staircase 1.40m deep. Folklorist Georgios Megas analyzes the reasons justifying the architectural choices of buildings from this period, stating that the form of the churches is a result of the inhabitants' fear of provoking the wrath of the occupiers, as they often fell victim to the Janissaries and the Delibashes who plagued the region of Thrace from their base in Constantinople. He vividly describes the fact that Thrace serves as the courtyard of the Capital, from which the above individuals launched attacks, causing damage and spreading terror.

The lack of a bell tower, the small shape of the Church, the poor lighting through the openings (fenestrations) on the roof, and the use of the alphabet in certain spots lead us to accept that the Church is a 14th-century construction. This is also supported by the fact that many of the crosses on the tombs around the Church, bearing inscriptions, date back to the pre-1800 era.

Both in classical times and during the era of decline, our Byzantine forefathers never built churches with such external shapes. Only during the Ottoman period were churches built resembling houses and underground to escape the attention of the conquerors.

Given that Didymoteicho and the surrounding area were already occupied by the Turks in 1361, we can easily conclude that the Church was built shortly after, under the rule of fear. This accounts for its unattractive and poor appearance.

Thus, the problem of identifying the painter of the Church remains unsolved. Despite our research, we could not find any testimony about him. From the overall work, however, we ascertain that he was an artist of great value, who knew well the economy of space, the issues of lighting, and the use and power of color. What he particularly knew was pure Byzantine iconography.

It is possible that he was an artist who fled from Constantinople shortly before or after its fall and temporarily or permanently settled in the village as an unknown among the holy and painted the Church. It is also possible that he was a cleric. Today, in the Church used by the inhabitants of the village, there is an icon of the Forty Martyrs, a small portable icon that is purely Byzantine art. All these icons undoubtedly come from the old Church of Saint Athanasius.

— https://www.he.duth.gr/erg_laog/arxeio/arxeio_thrakikou_laografikou_glossikou_thisavrou_t16.pdf

It is one of the four Post-Byzantine churches existing today in the northern part of Evros, in the villages of Paliouri, Alepochori in the municipality of Didymoteicho, and Patagi in the municipality of Orestiada. A significant portion of its iconography has been destroyed by the ravages of time and human interventions, according to the priest of the Prophet Elijah Church in Metaxades, Fr. Iakovos Arnautidis. The walls of the church have started to crumble, and water enters through the roof.

The church is almost unknown in the scientific literature, however, the cemetery extending to its north and east is considered the oldest and best-preserved in Evros, with the oldest inscription bearing the date 1691.

According to a survey conducted in 2000 by two archaeologists, Athanasios Brikas and Konstantinos Tsouris, who provide detailed and significant information about the four Post-Byzantine churches in the area, "very few Post-Byzantine churches in Western Thrace can be dated before 1800".

Specifically, for the Church of Saint Athanasius, they note that "although the year of its founding is unknown, the name of the Metropolitan of Didymoteicho, Jeremias, who is testified to between 1692–1697, is preserved. What survives from the iconography of the church can indeed be dated to a period around 1700".

According to other sources, the wall paintings of the church were likely created by a refugee from Constantinople, before or after the Fall, and the church may be much older, dating from the 11th century.

Together with the Post-Byzantine Church of Saint Athanasius in Metaxades, in the area there is also the Church of Saint Athanasius in Alepochori (1729) and the Church of Saint Panteleimon in Paliouri (~18th century), all from the same period. The icons of these churches in the area of Metaxades, at least those that indicate a date, are from 1869 to 1873, with the exception of the icon of the Virgin Mary of Metaxades, which is estimated to have been painted in the 15th to 16th century.

Virgin Mary of Metaxades

===== Panagia Metaxadiotissa =====
The Panagia Metaxadiotissa or Virgin Mary of Metaxades is an icon of the Virgin Mary that, according to local testimonies, was found in the Post-Byzantine Church of Saint Athanasius in Metaxades, Evros and dates from the 15th to 16th century. The icon has suffered damage over time, resulting in the faces of the Virgin Mary and Jesus Christ being altered. The Virgin Mary holds the Christ in her left hand, while her right hand is brought to her chest, wearing a red maphorion. Christ is depicted enthroned, as usual, with his right hand blessing while his left is not clearly visible. He wears a red robe and a blue tunic.

The icon verifies the dates of the Church of Saint Athanasius, which support the long history of the church connecting Metaxades with the history of the Byzantine Empire. Notably, it is an indisputable testament to religious faith and worship during the Ottoman occupation, with its presence extending to modern times. Today, the icon is housed in the Church of Prophet Elijah, which is the largest church in the village.

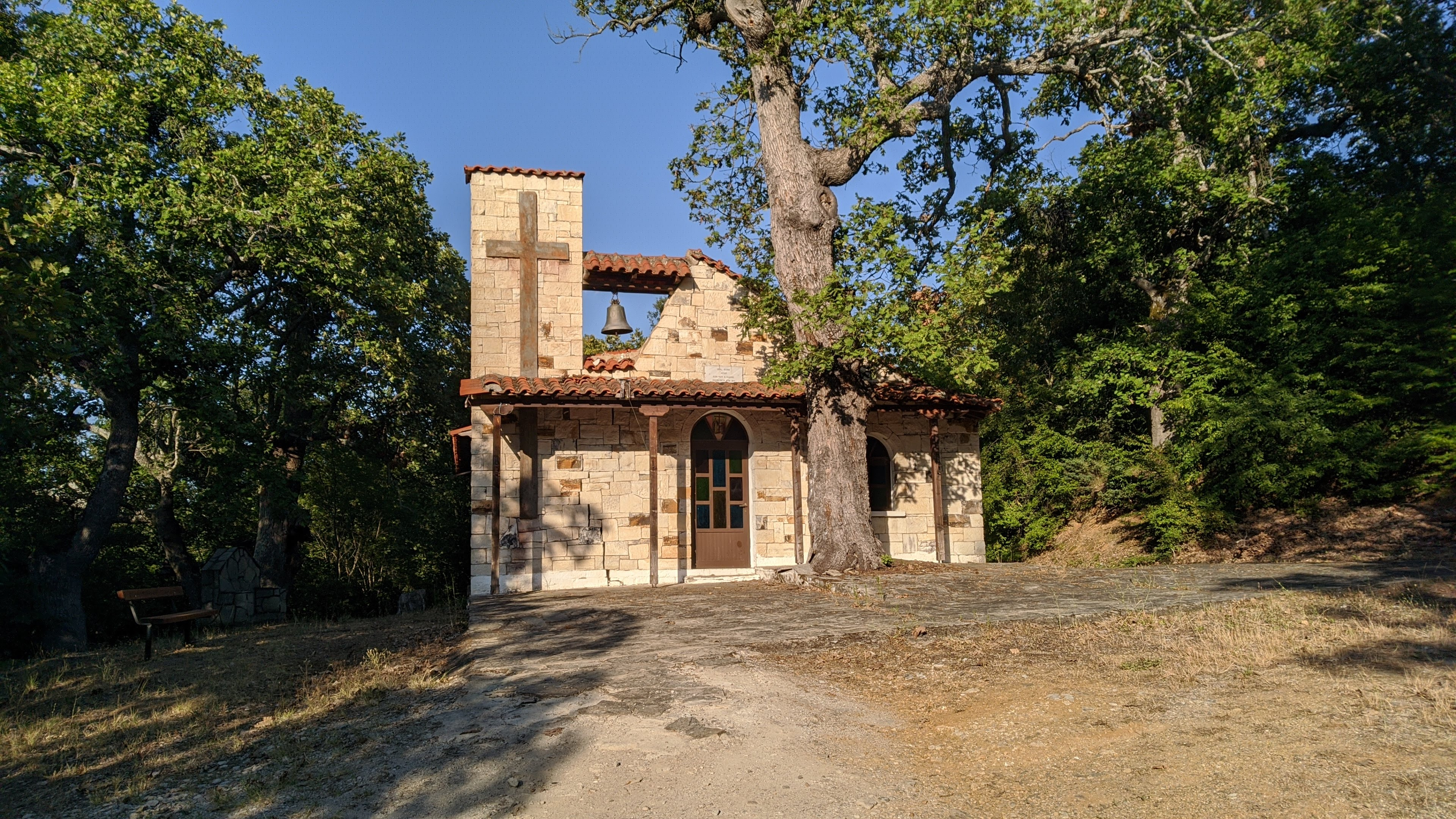
Greek Orthodox chapel of Saints Constantine and Helen

==== Church of Saints Constantine and Helen ====
The Church of Saints Constantine and Helen, built in 1971, is located south of the village in a forest. Just below it, there is a public area with benches and tables where locals gather for barbecues with their families on holidays like Easter and Saint Constantine and Helen Day.

To the south-southwest of Metaxades, a paved road leads towards Mikro Dereio. Approximately two kilometers from the village, a wooden pavilion is located on the left side of the road. Continuing for another 400 meters, the road reaches the forest recreation area of Saint Constantine and Helen, established by the previous municipal authorities. Situated at an altitude of 180 meters within a dense oak forest, the chapel of Saints Constantine and Helen is a notable feature of the area. The chapel's masonry, crafted from local chipped stone, follows the isodomic system, a technique also used in several of the traditional stone-built houses of Metaxades.

The area surrounding the chapel is marked by four large, ancient oak trees, while the remaining trees in the forest are much younger. The recreation area is well-equipped with various facilities, including wooden benches and tables, a water tap, barbecues, resting gazebos, a playground, litter bins, and toilets, making it a popular spot for outdoor activities. It is particularly frequented during events such as the May Day celebration.

==== Memorial to the Fallen of the Battle of Metaxades ====
The Memorial to the Fallen is an important and historic site of the village. During the Battle of Metaxades, the hill where the Memorial is located was one of the two hills where the battle took place. On this hill was the side of the Greek Army. At the hill where the site is located are multiple remnants of the battle, such as large holes on the ground and large stones.

==== Forests, Parks, and Small Dams ====
===== Municipal Park of Metaxades =====
The Municipal Park of the village, located below the Church of Saints Constantine and Helen, is a popular recreational spot for locals and visitors. The park is rich in biodiversity and has abundant flora and fauna. However, during the summer, there is a significant presence of snakes in the park.

The forest area extends to the southern end of Metaxades and covers a total of 15,260 hectares. This area, known as the Municipal Forest of Metaxades, was officially granted to the municipality in 1929 by a decision of the Administrative Court of the Ministry of Agriculture. The forest is primarily composed of oak trees aged between 20 and 50 years, with various other species present in smaller numbers, including species like anchovy, foxtail, maple, cedar, hornbeam, linden, alder, black pine, Scotch pine, sorb, elm, hawthorn, and poplar.

The forest's topography is generally gentle, with altitudes ranging from 70 to 300 meters above sea level. The area is characterized by ridges and small streams, which feed into three larger streams: Aba Dulapi, Lakos Domul, and Gournes. These streams contribute to the flow of the Erythropotamos, and the Metaxades forest is part of the Erythropotamos's catchment area.

===== Small Dam of Metaxades =====
Near the village's quarry area, there is a small dam that is used by the locals for relaxation and fishing.

=== Activities ===
Despite the natural and cultural wealth that the settlement of Metaxades possesses and showcases, there is no organized tourist flow in the area. Nor has the tourist traffic towards the tourist attractions of the region, such as the Dadia Forest and the Evros Delta, been used. Instead, there is a complete lack of serious initiatives for the protection and promotion of the monuments and the natural environment of the settlement.

==== Metaxades Sports Field ====
Shortly after entering the village, there is the Metaxades Sports Field. It is often used as an area offering a range of outdoor activities and community gatherings. The field is spacious and provides ample room for walking, sports, and picnics. Sometimes, the field hosts football matches between local teams. These games are a popular form of entertainment for locals and visitors.

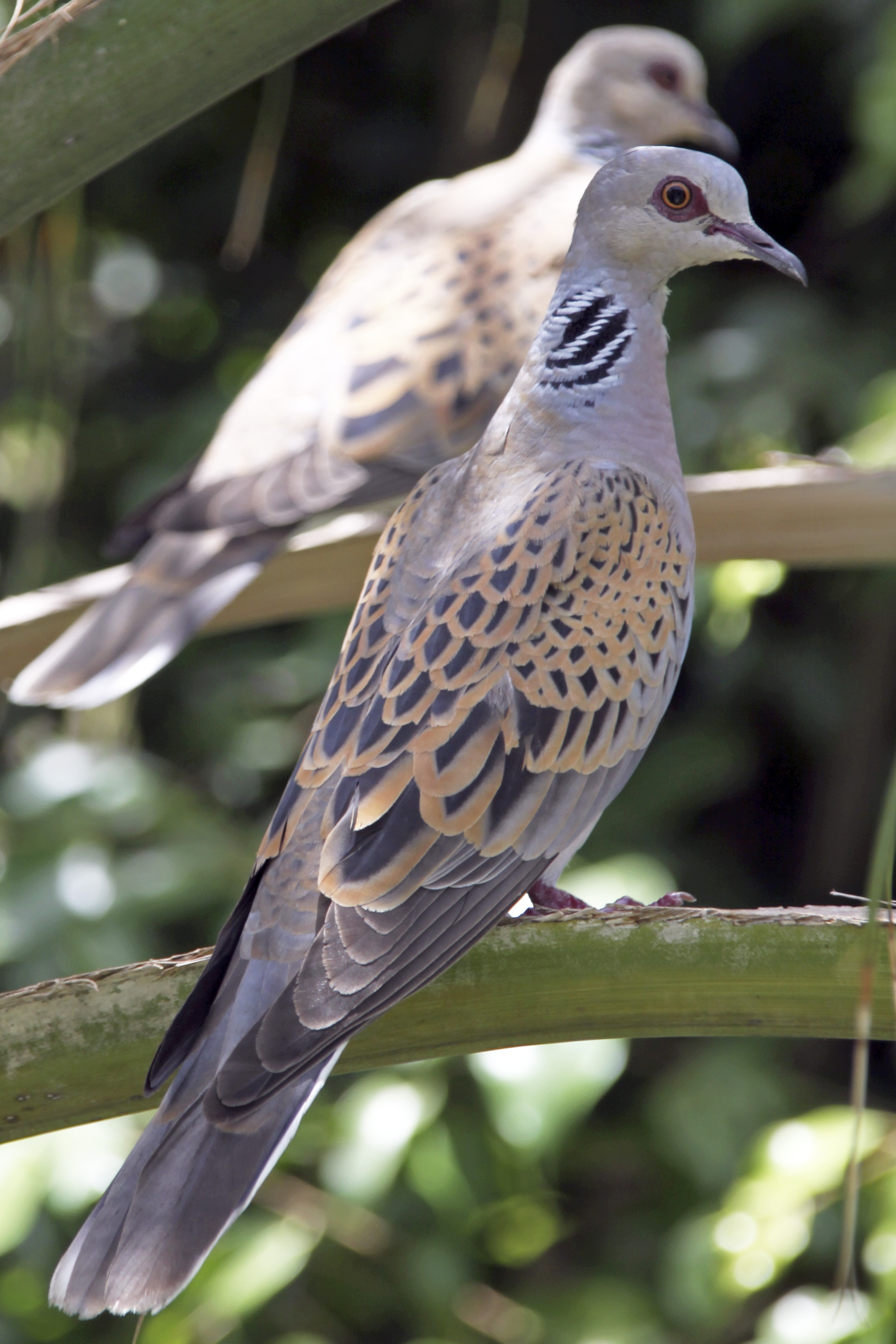
European Turtle Dove, a common bird in Metaxades

==== Hunting ====
Metaxades and the surrounding areas are popular for hunting activities, particularly known for their rich wildlife, particularly wild boar, European turtle dove, common quail, and other different animals.

The village is surrounded by numerous hunting spots, each offering diverse terrains for hunters. Notable areas include Galazio Pigadi, Drosia, Hatzi Kouri, Fountoukli, Kazania, Lefkes, Papadimadika, Megalos Lakos (also known as Kantina), Motsali, Parouses, Kalo Rema, Palia Ampelia, Bairoudia, Mikro Dasos, Mpolio, Livadia, Biziriaggelou, Pallas, Setman (also known as Vergi), and Sfageia.

The Hunting Club of Metaxades is a prominent organization dedicated to promoting hunting activities and fostering education among its members and aspiring hunters in the region. The club is particularly noted for its annual celebrations held each August, which feature barbecues, live music performances with traditional instruments, and various recreational activities such as shooting competitions.

These events attract significant local participation and are characterized by their emphasis on community spirit and respect for hunting traditions. A notable aspect of the celebration is the recognition and appreciation of hunting dogs, underscoring the club's commitment to the bond and love of humans with dogs and the integral role of dogs in hunting culture.

==== Food and Drink ====
The residents of Metaxades and the surrounding settlements produce a range of high-quality products, including cheese, sausages, honey, raki, and olive oil, which are supplied to the local market.

There are many restaurants, cafes and coffee shops, including those located near the village's hill, where the Memorial to the Fallen of the Battle of Metaxades is situated. There is also a traditional café from 1926, which has remained unchanged over time, providing a traditional atmosphere. In the evenings, it also operates as a tavern.

Additionally, traditional food can be found during festivals and celebrations, such as those of Prophet Elijah, Giagianos, etc.

==== Shops and Organizations ====
Various shops operate in the village, such as 3 mini markets, a pharmacy, an OPAP agency, a hair salon, a butcher shop, a funeral home, etc.

In the village square, in the Community Building of Metaxades, there is the Citizen Service Centre (CSC) that serves the local area, an ATM of Piraeus Bank, and the Children's and Youth Library.

==== Museums ====
Metaxades has been designated as a traditional settlement with distinctive architectural features.

Since 1997, the old building of the "Koukoulospito" and its surrounding area have been designated as a historical monument "because it retains features, typological, morphological, and constructional elements of a house as well as professional-industrial buildings of the area (koukoulo houses) and is important for the study of architecture".

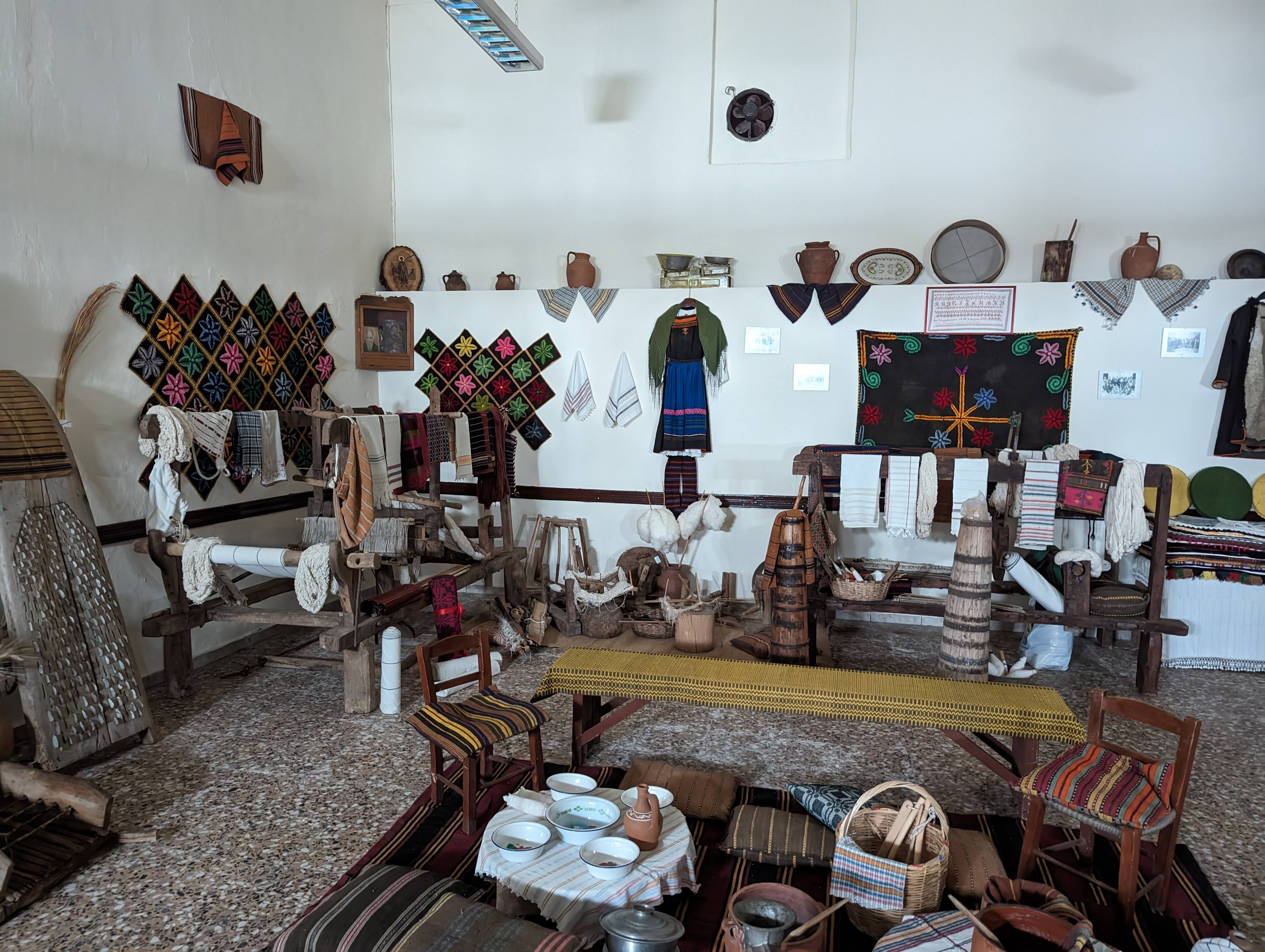
Folklore Museum of Metaxades

===== Folklore Museum of Metaxades =====
Since 2018, with the initiative of the women's association of the village, the Folklore Museum of Metaxades has been operating, aiming to transmit traditions through the activities of the past inhabitants. With its abundance of objects and images, the museum reminds every visitor of the renowned past of the place and its rich cultural heritage.

The museum's hallmark is the loom of the era. With the loom, the locals wove dresses, shirts, cloths, and various other fabrics. Due to the adverse economic conditions, it was almost impossible for the residents of Metaxades to buy commercial clothes, so they used the loom.

"The place essentially consists of the residents' livelihood. All the memories and images that the elders first lived through, but also we as visitors see, remind us of the village's glorious past", says Mr. Milonas during his visit with the show "From Place to Place".

===== Technological Museum of Metaxades =====
Since May 2018, the Metaxades High School with Lyceum Classes has had a Technology Museum with a collection of antiques and objects showcasing the history of technology and its impact on society. Visitors can see a range of items, from ancient tools to modern electronic devices, such as projectors, overhead projectors, typewriters, cassette players, and televisions, which were used in teaching past decades. The museum offers a valuable resource for students studying the history of technology and is open to visitors, providing the opportunity to explore and appreciate the fascinating history of technology.

=== Illegal immigration ===
Metaxades has been frequently involved in incidents related to illegal immigration due to its geographical location and the presence of a border guard office. The area has seen a rise in illegal immigration, particularly through the Greek-Turkish border, which has led to various challenges for the local community.

Human traffickers often transport illegal immigrants through the area, sometimes driving vehicles in reverse on local roads, which has resulted in accidents and property damage. Additionally, illegal immigrants frequently pass through the village, occasionally causing damage to homes, farms and other structures in the general area of the region. Instances of car theft have also been reported.

In 2019, a notable incident was reported by a female teacher and regional council candidate, who encountered a group of 20 to 30 illegal immigrants while driving on a rural road near Metaxades. The group, emerging suddenly from nearby vegetation, blocked her path by throwing their bags onto the road. The teacher, who was alone in her vehicle, quickly turned around and drove back to avoid the group. The incident prompted a police investigation, as the group's intentions remained unclear, though the presence of backpacks suggested they had recently crossed the Evros River.

== Tradition ==
The area of Metaxades is rich in customs and traditions, both religious and seasonal, which keep the flame of tradition alive over time. Customs and, by extension, traditions, have a collective character, as all the villagers participate, and not only them. The customs in Metaxades, through their revival, provide an opportunity for the residents of the area to come together in the context of festive events. Accompanied by food and drink from the Cultural Association of Metaxades, customs and traditions take on a celebratory character.

=== Social structure and family life ===
Society in Metaxades was traditionally agrarian, organized around the extended family unit which typically included a couple and their parents. Gender roles were distinct yet cooperative, while forestry and heavy plowing were exclusively male domains, women participated in all agricultural tasks, livestock feeding, and milking, in addition to domestic management. Children entered the workforce early, around age 9 or 10.

The village utilized specific kinship terms in daily address. A father was addressed as baba and a mother as mana, while grandfathers were pappou and grandmothers babou. Unique honorifics were used for siblings: an older brother was called Batis and an older sister Tsatsa. In-law relations also carried specific titles, for instance, a daughter-in-law addressed her father-in-law as Afent' (Master) and a groom was addressed by his wife’s siblings as Mpasia.

Community life was characterized by strong mutual aid (allilovoitheia). Villagers voluntarily assisted one another in house building and urgent agricultural work. Godparenthood (koumparia) created strict social bonds, marriage between families linked by godparenthood was forbidden, and changing a godparent required the original godparent's permission and blessing.

=== Traditional Customs of Metaxades ===
==== Christmas ====
During the Christmas and New Year period, Metaxades prepare from the eve of the big celebration. The housewives incense the house to welcome the goblins, and at night the men go around for the "kolianta". They don't sing, but silently take carts, gates, and any other small or large object that the house owners have forgotten outside. They gather them in the village square, and from there, the owners take them back the next day after leaving a token payment. On the morning of Christmas Eve, the pig slaughter begins while the children go around singing carols. In the evening, there are nine fasting foods on the table. The whole family gathers to dine, waiting for the Christoiannades. These are the village lads who sing the Christmas carols on Christmas Eve. Starting from the Chapel of Saint Athanasius, they go around the village, singing different carols for each house, depending on the age, family status, and occupation. They also sang for farriers, blacksmiths, tailors, soldiers, painters, shepherds, engaged couples, married couples, childless couples. In all houses, however, they began with:

"Christoianna, Christoianna, now Christ is born, born and raised in honey and milk, honey is eaten by the lords and coins by the saints, and the young men wear the honey herbs".

They ended around midnight singing:

"And from there Christ passed with twelve Apostles and again returned with the nine archangels and where Christ touched a golden tree sprouted, golden were its branches and silver were its leaves, and on its top doves nested".

==== New Year's Eve ====
On New Year's Eve, before the turn of the year, the village women would open the leaves for the traditional vasilopita while the children would go out early in the morning for the "sourvala" (New Year's carols) shouting: Sourvala, bapu, tsitsi, meaning: meat, grandma, in the sourvalia. Sourvalia was a sturdy rod from a cornel tree on which they threaded whatever they were given: sausages, cookies, and mainly cured meat. After church, everyone gathered around the sofra (a low round wooden table) to cut the vasilopita. They incensed, and the head of the house, after crossing the pie, cut pieces, first for Saint Basil, then for Christ, for the house, for the animals, for the fields, and for each family member in order, from oldest to youngest.

==== Epiphany ====
On Epiphany Eve, they would boil the "bambo" (a thick sausage made from intestines stuffed with finely chopped pork). On the day itself, they would go to the fountain for the blessing of the waters. They took holy water to sprinkle on the fields, the animals, and kept some as medicine in the iconostasis. The children went around singing the "Fota". After church, there was – and still is – an auction of the icons in the square. They are bought symbolically by the highest bidders, and the proceeds go to the church for its needs and for poor families.

==== The Custom of the Bey ====
The Bey is a traditional Carnival custom with roots in the Ottoman occupation. On Tsiknopempti, they slaughtered chickens to ensure that the food wouldn't smoke for the rest of the year. On the last Sunday, Cheese Sunday, they went to their parental homes where they ate, drank, and wished "forgiven and blessed", meaning they forgave each other for any minor quarrels and disputes of the past year. The mother-in-law offered halva to the daughter-in-law. The biggest celebration takes place on Clean Monday. Someone is elected Bey and smeared with charcoal. Along with his entourage, on a two-wheeled cart loaded with garlic and onions hanging, they go around the houses collecting wheat and legumes, which they sell at the end and donate the money to the church and the poor. Another person dresses as an Arab. They also make a straw effigy on wheels, the "stampouloudi". The straw man has a letter on him for the Arab, stating that he has come from abroad and wants to wrestle. The wrestling begins, and the stampouloudi wins. The Arab holds a long stick ending in the "topouzi", a wide and deep plate in which the spectators throw money. With a pair of wooden binoculars, he "observes" who doesn't throw money into the topouzi. A dance follows, led by the "wife" holding a basin full of water, into which people throw their obol. In the end, the Arab gives blessings for the crops. He scatters seeds into the air and wishes that the higher they go, the bigger the harvest will be. The collected money is shared with the village's poor.

==== Holy Week and Easter ====
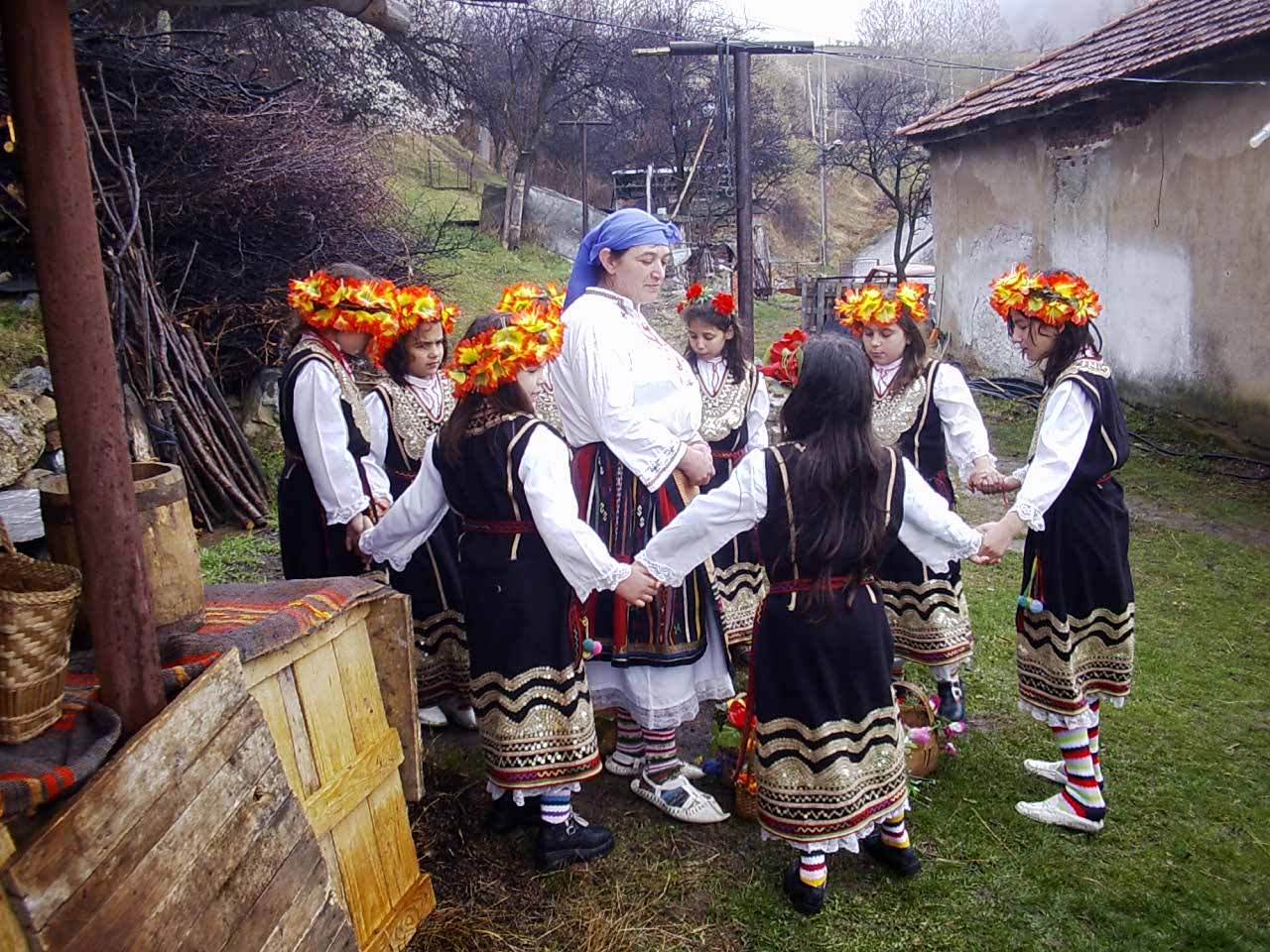
Lazarines in Bulgaria

===== Lazarines =====
The events began on Lazarus Saturday. In Metaxades, the Lazarines (also known as Lazaritses, Lazaraios, Lazarakia, Lazarice or Lazaritsia in other villages) began preparations for the feast of Saint Lazarus as early as Clean Monday. This tradition is a South Slavic procession, also referred to as Lazaruvane in Bulgaria, is part of the broader customs observed during the Eastern Orthodox feast of Lazareva Subota, the day before Palm Sunday.

The origins of Lazarice are believed to trace back to the Roman festival Rosalia, which was popularized in Southeastern Europe after the Romans' conquest of the Balkans in the 2nd century B.C. When Slavic tribes settled in the Balkans during the 6th to 7th centuries, they adopted and transformed these traditions into their own rites. In Metaxades, the Lazarice procession is an important part of the local cultural and religious celebrations, reflecting the area's deep-rooted connection to both Slavic and Greek-Roman traditions.

The Lazarines, dressed in their best clothes, went around the houses singing from the morning. The housewives put eggs into the baskets they carried. When they entered the courtyard of a house, they sang: "In these high houses, covered in gold, with gold and with coins and with pearls"... and continued the song depending on the family, singing the same songs as Christmas but with different music. On the way from one house to another, they sang: "From the lord's house we go to the lord's house, sing, my little nightingale, sing". A key part of the celebration was the formation of b'lukia, a group of 5–8 girls, typically aged 11–15. Girls older than 15 were not generally involved in the Lazarus procession, as they would face mockery from other women.

First-time participants who were unfamiliar with the traditional songs or dances learned them through communal gatherings at the homes of younger girls, under the guidance of more experienced participants. This practice exemplified the oral, aural, and visual transmission of tradition across generations.

On the day of the feast in Metaxades, participants would gather at the house of a young woman, a member of the agermus group, at dawn to prepare for the event. They would dress in colorful costumes, often embroidered with precious brisim, lace, sequins, and beads. Their attire included various adornments such as beads, coins, pennies, doubloons, geraniums, silver necklaces, tinsel, chains, and rings made of silver, gold, and gold-plated jewelry.

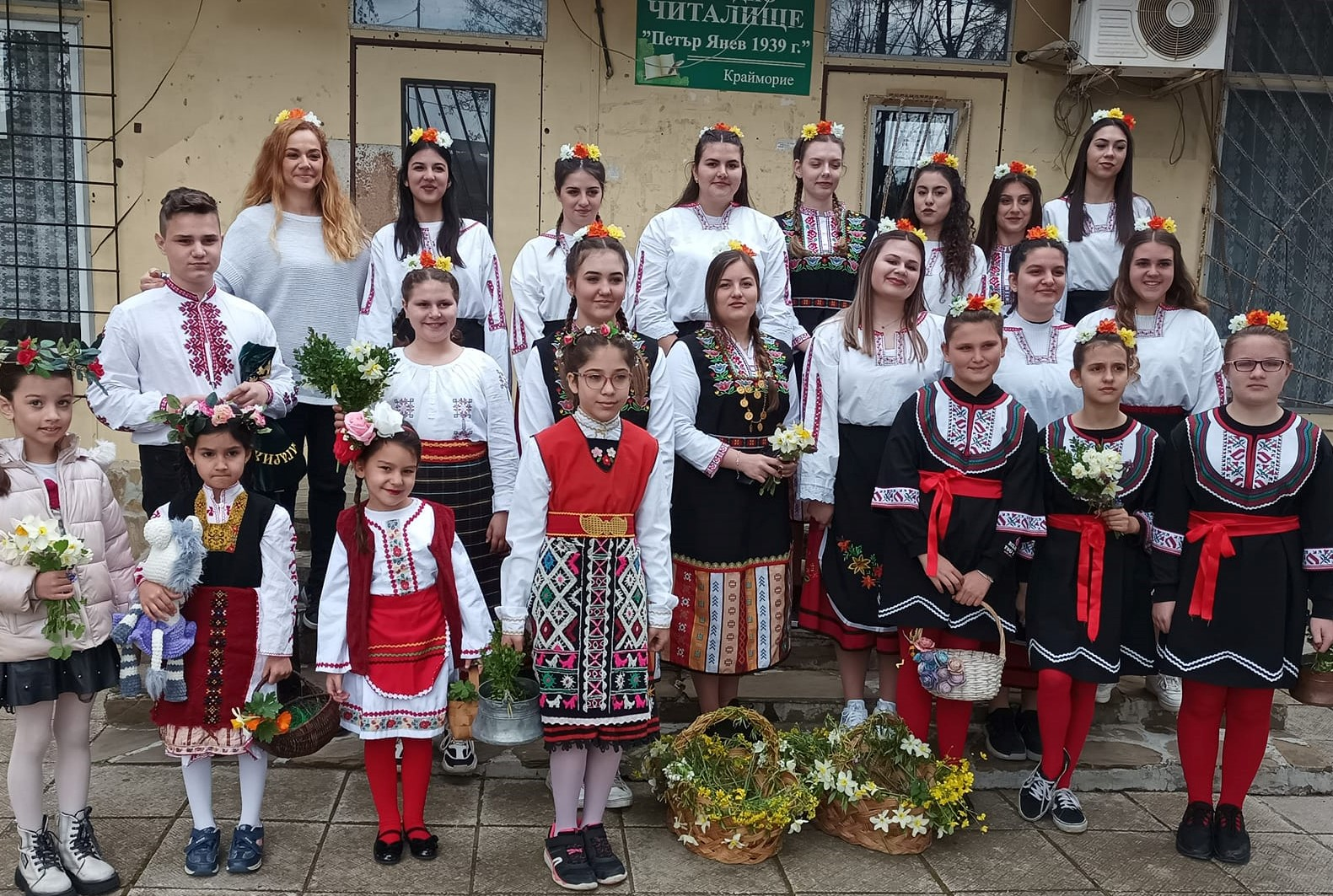
Lazarines in Kraimorie, Bulgaria

Once their clothing was inspected, the hostess would place the first egg-gift (symbolizing a good start and fertility) in a flower basket, and provide money (the para) to the leader of the group to guide them. Historically, money was not always part of the event, but it became integrated later with the commodification of life and societal changes.

A key feature of these Lazarus agermas was the participation of girls of marriageable age. The custom had a strong social dimension, serving as a ritual to mark the transition from childhood to adolescence for these young women. Their public performance, often in the village square, was a form of introduction to society and an opportunity to demonstrate the qualities of an ideal future wife. During this time, the girls' appearance and behavior were evaluated, as they were expected to display beauty, potential for procreation, chastity, and various skills such as dancing, singing, and manual labor.

After reaching puberty (marked by menstruation), a girl's social role changed. She became focused on preparing her dowry and fulfilling domestic duties. Older women, having completed their childbearing years, retained an irreplaceable role in society due to their experience. They were responsible for passing on cultural values and oral traditions.

Traditional society in Metaxades was highly structured, with clear roles and behaviors governing social expectations. The biological milestones of puberty, marriage, childbirth, and menopause defined a woman's role within the community. Fertility, both actual and potential, was central to societal expectations of women, while sexuality outside of reproduction was often viewed as inappropriate, only being acknowledged during carnival celebrations.

The Christian celebration of Lazarus was observed in the villages surrounding Metaxades, including Avdella, Polia, Giatrades, and Savra, as well as among the Muslim Romani people. Known by different names such as Ftukhulazar, Katsivell'kus Lazar, or Lazar of the Aftuhs, this "solemn day" was marked by unique customs in the region.

On this day, Muslim women would dress their children in their finest clothes, salwaras, tufted skirts, floral garments, adorned with ribbons, braids, rings, baubles, and blue beads with peepholes. They would then return to the villages, singing carols in their own language and performing the corresponding dance, accompanied by the rhythmic sound of tambourines played by their mothers.

Orthodox housewives, in turn, would offer treats such as nuts, flour, bread, raisins, and candy. The Greek carol sung during this time had an erotic and festive quality, reminiscent of the "old" Thracian lazarika and the "Lalar Lalaska" folk chants, reflecting the sensual and celebratory spirit of the occasion.

In these tall houses, made of gold
With gold and with coins and with pearls,
In the middle of the gold, a golden carpet is spread,
There sits the master with his little lady.
Ladies, oh, they woke up to light the lamps,
To light yellow candles and green lights,
To shine for the lady, to prepare the master's bed,
To spread it on the roses, to fall on the flowers,
To smell beautiful, like jasmine, like lilacs,
Like jasmine, like roses, like green basil.

— Traditional Lazarus song from Metaxades

===== Holy Week =====
On Palm Sunday, after the service, they went to the chapel of Prophet Elias, where they sang and danced. On Holy Thursday, they dyed the eggs with rizari (red root) and onion skins. However, if a family member died in the previous year, the family paints eggs dark blue or black and takes them to the cemetery on Easter Monday. Several of these eggs are laid on the grave, while the rest are given to the poor.

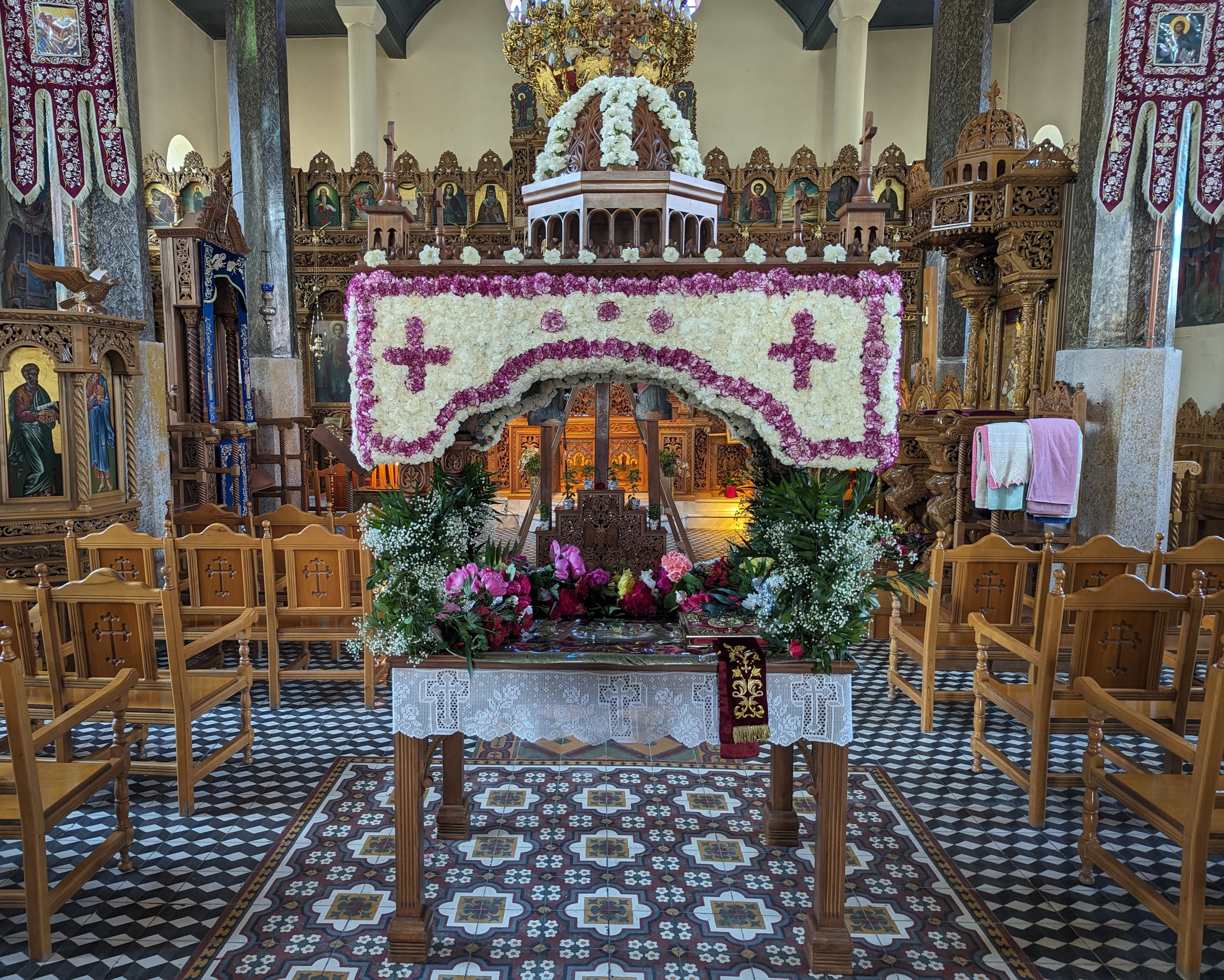
The Epitaph in the Prophet Elias Church of Metaxades

On Good Friday, they made the Easter breads with the red egg in the middle and tsourekia. On Easter Sunday, after church, they went to the godmother with the Easter bread and eggs and ate the lamb together. In the afternoon, there was dancing in the village square. The women sang and danced at the same time. The dance began with the "Genitsaro".

"A short janissary, very short he was not, a heavy dose they gave him because he has a beautiful wife, the villagers envied him, the neighbors envied him, even the king envied him because he has a beautiful wife"...

On the same day, the girls and lads went to the countryside and made swings opposite each other so that when they swung, they met in the air and their feet touched. At the same time, they sang:

"Giannis' mother goes to church and his sister dressed up all day Saturday his mother goes ahead, his sister in the middle then comes the hungry one, like a withered apple like an apple, like a rose, like a green basil"...

On the Friday of the Life-Giving Spring, a small festival was held. It took place at a small chapel on the Kouri hill, a bit lower than the Prophet Elias. Everyone climbed the hill, the women sang and danced, and they ate there, roasting their lambs on spits.

==== The Yayanos ====
Celebrated for two consecutive nights, 23 and 24 June. The "Yayanos" custom is very old and of great significance to everyone, especially to the farmers, as it reminded them that midsummer had arrived and from then on, the crops were not allowed.

On the evening of 22 June, they prepared their best clothes. At dawn, they went to their fields, from where they left only in the afternoon. After bathing and cleaning, they dressed, and especially the women did not wear white shirts but red ones. Finally, they made a large bouquet of flowers of all kinds, especially of yayanos and walnuts, and danced with it in the square. The same happened the next day. The song they sang and danced to was:

"And yayanos and synaros, John's herb the two herbs quarreled over which one smells better the holy herb smells which knows and smells the honeysuckle smells which knows the vine and Saint Yayanos smells which knows the earth. A fair-haired girl gathered it, braiding the ribbon braiding and watching and singing softly in the middle they braid Christ, on the edge the Gospel and in the braidings, they braid Saint John. Little pebble spring, I waited for you for people to come for water, don't give them water only ask them who is King John who has nine sons and married off all nine takes nine brides, all called him master all gifted him a kerchief, the youngest bride did not call him master, did not gift him a kerchief".

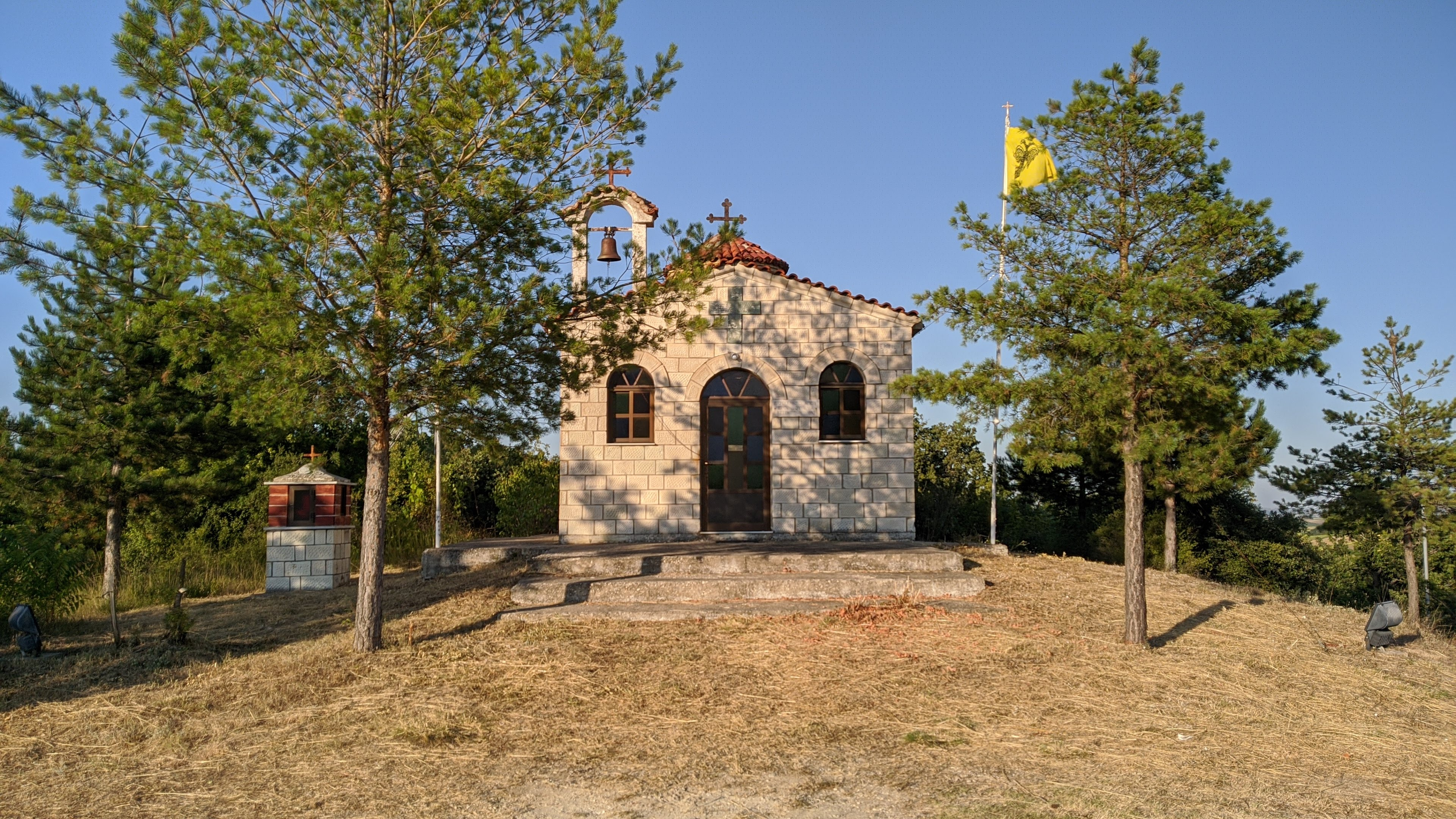
The Chapel of Prophet Elias in Metaxades

==== Prophet Elias ====
On this day, the festival is held. From the eve, traders with their wares arrived. After returning from their agricultural work, the people dressed in their best clothes and went out to the square. There, a big dance took place with bagpipes and zournas, from young and old alike. The women always sang in groups while dancing.

Apart from the regular and scheduled celebrations and events, there were others in between to relieve themselves from their busy lives. Thus, they found opportunities to celebrate at the end of the harvest, during the grape harvest, on Saint Demetrius' Day, and on Saint Tryphon's Day. And let's not forget the "joys" (weddings) which were very frequent in the past.

==== The Traditional Wedding ====
Marriage customs were patrilocal, with the new couple settling in the groom's paternal home. It was common for all married brothers to live together with their parents in a joint household where the father managed all income and property until his old age necessitated the division of assets. If a family had only daughters, they might practice the custom of sogambros, where a husband moved into his wife's paternal home. Marriages were generally arranged between families from the same or neighboring regions (such as Ortakio or Didymoteicho).

The wedding started on Monday. The groom's father went to the priest for the licenses. Then he went to the Metropolis for the marriage papers. Then they shopped for the bride's adornments.

On Wednesday, with a bottle of liqueur or ouzo and sweets, they informed the best man (koumbaros) about the wedding. Then the girls and the bride's relatives gathered at the bride's house and turned the clothes from the right side (in the trunks they were kept inside out), folded them, and placed basil between them. They arranged the quilts and mattresses on the beds, called "sikou". The embroideries and knits were hung on ropes on the veranda or hung on the walls so everyone could see the bride's skills. Once they finished arranging the dowry, they ate and sang. Dowries were a strict requirement, typically consisting of 5–10 gold pounds, household goods, and clothing, but rarely land or houses. Inheritance customs dictated that land passed primarily to sons, while daughters received their share via dowry. However, if a man died, his widow was entitled to one-fifth of the estate, with the remainder divided among the children.

On Thursday, they kneaded bread and made the bread roll at both the bride's and the groom's houses. At the bride's house, they also made a saragli pie which they inverted onto the bread roll. The groom's relatives took their bread roll and the bride's adornments to her. There they were treated and shared the bread roll. They gifted the bride money, then took the bread roll with the saragli. From Thursday evening, the bride slept until Sunday with two girls and the groom with two boys. During these days, the groom was forbidden to go to the bride's house. If he went, they blackened him.

On Friday, they made bread rolls and food (bulgur) and distributed them to the relatives as an invitation. On the same night, there was a rehearsal of the bridal dress with songs from the bride's friends.

On Saturday, they cooked at both the groom's and the bride's houses and each hosted their relatives. In the evening, the groom's relatives, after dinner, with musical accompaniment and the groom, went to the bride's house and danced the "gikna" (a bread roll with three candles). A girl who was not an orphan brought out the gikna and started the dance, then the bride took it, and finally, everyone who danced.

On Sunday morning, the groom's guests went with the musicians to the bride's house. There they were treated to appetizers, and after folding the bride's clothes again to take them along, they danced. The bride, dressed up, opened the dance first, then the relatives. Returning to the groom's house, they treated everyone who helped with the wedding, called "birintzides".

Then the groom, his relatives, and the musicians went to the best man's house. The closest couple to the groom, the man holding a bottle of wine and the woman a pitcher with wine and apple pieces. The best men greeted them at the door with wine, and they exchanged wishes. After taking the best men and their guests (paranouns), they went to the bride to take her. The bride sat backward at the window holding a mirror and a glass of wine with coins in it, the "wine coin". When she saw the groom coming, she threw the wine out the window, and the children gathered the coins. Then the bride, with two friends and the godmother, went to a room to put on her adornments. Meanwhile, the groom's relatives "bought" her dowry and took it to his house, where they laid it out.

When the godmother finished the adornment, the groom and the best man knocked on the door three times and pushed it to open to take the bride. A woman from the bride's side said, "Give the five", and the groom threw money into her apron. Then the best man introduced the couple (the groom always on the right). As the bride left, she greeted her parents and siblings and bowed at the house entrance. Her parents threw candies and coins. Dancing, the relatives with the musicians went to the church. Leading was a boy with the flagpole. It was a pole with an embroidered handkerchief, an apple at the top, and a cross. The apple was eaten by the couple the day after their wedding. After the crowns, the guests gifted the couple. The groom's parents left first for the house. There, the mother-in-law placed a red cloth and an iron plowshare at the entrance. When the couple arrived, the bride bowed to the in-laws, who kissed the crowns. Then the couple stepped on the plowshare for strength and the red cloth for joy.

They then sat at the table, and the celebration followed. The best man started the dance, followed by the bridesmaid, the groom, and the bride. Whoever took the dance was gifted money. For the groom's relatives, there were gifts (clothing items) from the bride's family. The celebration ended with the onset of night, and the musicians accompanied the best men to their house, where they danced.

On Monday and Tuesday, the bride arranged her dowry with the girls. On Wednesday, she took her pitcher and went to the fountain for water. As she took it, she threw coins into the fountain. On Thursday, the bride with the groom and a girl from his family went to her parental house. There, the bride bathed, and they all ate together.

=== Traditional Costumes ===
The traditional attire of men and women in Metaxades consists of many beautiful parts, all woven and embroidered with imagination and care. It is an inseparable part of the village's cultural heritage and a hallmark of the wider area. The clothes were sewn by tailors and dyed by dyers. Dyeing was very difficult, as they had to achieve a uniform color. Initially, the clothes were placed on a large round stone. They poured the dye over them and then pounded them with a wooden beater, gradually adding color until they achieved the desired shade.

The technique of reserving fabric by tying it with thread before dyeing, commonly used in the region, involved various methods to achieve different patterns. The simplest form resulted in white patterns on a blue background, typically seen in women's skirts. Another variation involved tying the fabric, dyeing it blue, removing the ties, and then over-dyeing it yellow, producing a dark blue-green with yellow patterns. A more complex method included tying specific areas, dyeing light blue, removing the ties, re-tying other areas, and then dyeing yellow, resulting in yellow and blue spots on a green background.

This tie-dye technique was extensively practiced and documented. Such fabrics were found in areas such as the village of Metaxades. This technique was part of the local textile tradition in Greek Thrace, showcasing the region's rich cultural heritage in fabric dyeing and decoration.

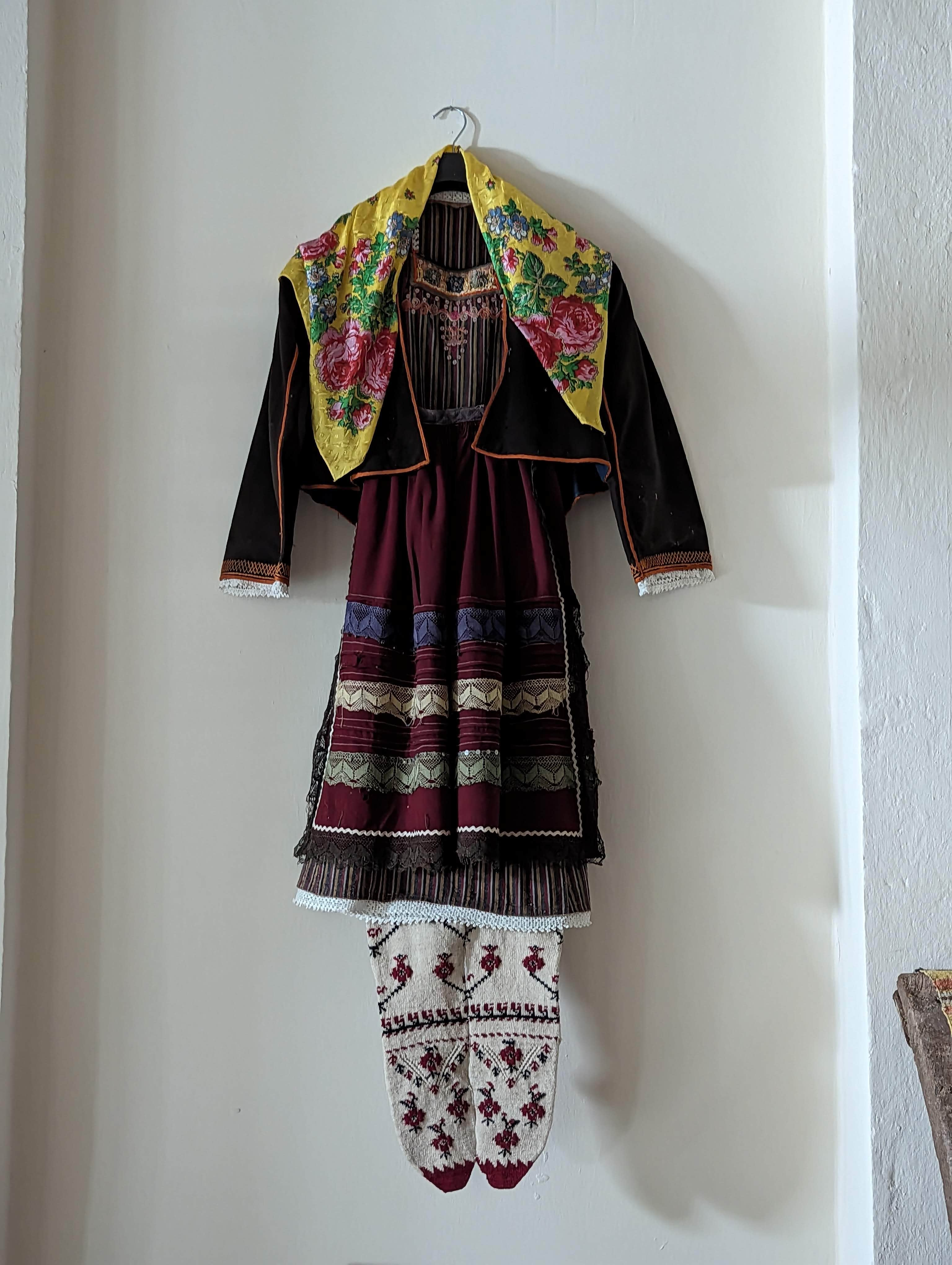
The traditional women's costume of Metaxades

==== The Women's Costume ====
The women's costume consists of the following parts: the shirt, the dress (foustan), the vest (kapoudi), the jacket (saltamarka), the apron, the coat (gouna), the socks (tsirapia), the shoes (mestia), the scarves, and various other accessories and jewelry.

- The shirt: The shirt was cotton with silk or wool stripes. It was longer than the dress and decorated on the sleeves and hem with sequins and lace, while the neck had a trim. The color was white except for the bride's, which was red.
- The dress: The dress was made from cotton, woven fabric. Single girls wore red dresses, married young women green and blue, while old women and widows wore black. They embroidered it with orange thread and decorated it with braids, outer braids, and sequins. The upper part, called the "bosom", was embroidered with various designs in sequins and bright-colored braid. It was sleeveless and had two openings at chest height, the "korfolytra", used for nursing babies. Their "good" dresses were made from cotton and silk and were called "dipanies".
- The vest: The vest was made of woolen fabric. The edges had sewn cord, and the front corners of the hem had embroidery with sequins and braid.
- The saltamarka: The everyday saltamarka was made of woolen fabric, while the festive one was made of felt or cotton. It was black or brown and decorated with braid on the edges and embroidered flowers.
- The apron: Also called "brosnela" or "zabagatsa". The apron came in various colors: red, green, blue, yellow, and others, and was decorated with lace, friezes, sequins, and beads. They were made of velvet, silk, wool, and satin.
- The coat: The "short coat" was the winter outer garment. It was black or red made of cotton or felt fabric. It was lined with lamb leather and had a fox fur trim around the edges. It was decorated with gold braid and outer braid on the sleeves and edges.
- The socks: The socks were knitted with cotton or woolen thread with various designs on a white background. The socks reached the knee and were tied with thread around the calf.
- The shoes: The shoes had a shoe-like shape. They were also knitted with wool or cotton thread with designs. The festive ones were made of velvet fabric, usually red, embroidered with multicolored threads and sequins.
- The scarf: There were silk (atsiourmades), cotton (klouthates), and woolen (voulgarkes) scarves. Their colors varied depending on the material. They were embroidered with beautiful floral designs. Some had white coins and beads (mamoukia) sewn on.

===== Decorative Items and Jewelry =====
Women paid special attention to their appearance and decorated, more specifically, their head and neck. The main decorative items were:

- The tsiakatia: A ribbon decorated with sequins, beads, and trimmings. They wore it on their forehead.
- The xenomallia: Braids made from old hair kept after a haircut. They wore them with their festive clothes to make their hair look long and rich.
- The ribbons: Colorful scraps woven together with the xenemallia and hanging down their back.
- The sergkoutsi: A type of pin with a fabric flower. They pinned it onto their scarf, left and right.
- The pins: Petal-shaped pins, worn five together next to the sergkoutsi.
- The girdani: A piece of fabric with beads and sequins sewn onto it or threaded onto a sturdy string. It was worn around the neck. Around the neck, they also wore jewelry. The most common were coins and dubles, sewn onto black fabric.
- The yarmbas: A wide gold chain with a pendant.
- The zonari: The women's festive belt, made of bronze with gold-plated decorations and beads in various patterns. Where it fastened, it had a chain for a more secure closure.

==== The Bride's Costume ====
The color of the dress was red. The shirt, also red, was made of silk. The embroidery and decorations on the bodice were richer than usual. The apron was red velvet, decorated with lace, sequins, and braid. The tsirapia were red "roukenia". On her head, she wore a scarf decorated with sergkoutsi and pins, as well as xenemallia. An essential part of the bridal costume was the coat, both in winter and summer. It was made of red felt and decorated with gold braid. Finally, over the scarf, she wore a veil that covered her entire head, including her face.

==== The Men's Costume ====
The men's costume, compared to the women's, was simpler and more austere. It consisted of the following pieces: The vraka (summer pants), the poutouri (winter pants), the shirt, the vest (tzamantani), the jacket (tsoukna), the belt (zonari), the turban (sariki), the socks (mgyalia), the shoes (tsarouhia), and the winter cape (giampourlouki).

- The vraka: The vraka was black, made of cotton fabric, wide to the knees and narrow from there down. The poutouri was woolen vraka.
- The shirt: The shirt was cotton for summer and wool for winter. It was white, without collars, but with a deep opening at the chest. In contrast, the festive shirt had decorations on the sleeves.
- The vest: The vest was cotton or wool, depending on the season. It was black and had no special decorations.
- The tsoukna: The tsoukna was today's jacket. It was made of black woolen fabric.
- The zonari: The zonari was a long woven red belt that wrapped around the waist two or three times. Besides adding beauty to the outfit by breaking the monotony of the black color, it was used as a pouch (in its folds), in which they placed money, tobacco, and other small items they carried with them.
- The sariki: The sariki was a long black fabric with fringes, which was wrapped around the head with one end secured and the other hanging.
- The mgyalia: The mgyalia were large, white, woolen fabrics with which they wrapped their calves, covering the narrow part of the poutouri.
- The tsarouhia: The tsarouhia were made from pigskin. They had large laces, which wrapped around the mgyalia and secured them. The festive tsarouhia were made from cowhide to be more durable.
- The giampourlouki: The giampourlouki was a thick cape made of black woolen fabric worn over the vest and the tsoukna.

=== Songs ===
Both folk songs and dance in Metaxades have always been an integral part of the daily life of the residents, as they could express their emotions through them. Their feelings concerned love, death, exile, the difficult life of the time. Music, song, and dance appeared as a balm for bitterness and pessimism, helping to emotionally unload the day and entertain the residents' hardships.

==== "Vasilkouda / In the village of Metaxades" – Zonaradikos ====
The most famous song of the village. It refers to Giannis the Mayor, who was born in 1881 and died in 1962. Giannis Mandas or Mantoudis, as his full name was, served as Mayor during the period 1920 – 1923, hence the nickname "Giannis Mayor". The first official love of the notorious Giannis the Mayor was Triantafyllia, born in 1884. He first married her in 1911. She died of grief upon learning that the Turks had tortured her husband, who was then the village mukhtar (local head). However, a few years after their marriage, Triantafyllia died, leaving Giannis a widower. However, Giannis, as it seems, could not bear loneliness and was not deterred.

On the contrary, fairly soon, he married Despina, who was a year younger than him. In 1910, their daughter, Zoe, was born. Nevertheless, life had another heavy blow in store for him. In the following years, Giannis was conscripted due to the Balkan Wars in Adrianople. Upon his return, he was met with very sad news. Due to an epidemic that had hit the village, both his wife and daughter died.

The most famous and sung-about Mayor of Thrace, again, did not remain in mourning for long. A few months later, he married Maria Tsiakiroudi, born in 1886, known in the village by the nickname Theodora or Theodoroula. However, with Theodora, he was unable to have children.

Thus, because he found it heavy not to continue his lineage, he divorced Theodora and married the well-known to everyone, Vasiliki Bakaloudi or Vasilkouda, who lived until 1975. Naturally, for the time, this fourth marriage was never accepted by the Church. Despite, however, the objections of both Vasiliki's family and their social circle, Giannis and Vasiliki lived happily until the end of their lives, having as their companions their three children, Christos, Triantafyllia, and Panagiotis.

==== "The Twelve Apostles" – Sirtos ====
This historical song of Metaxades narrates the brave resistance of its residents to an attempted occupation by the Turks in 1912. Although the Turks had never lived in the village, they aimed to occupy it. However, the villagers spotted their approach and alerted Captain Giannis Sokos. With only two soldiers, Sokos placed his troops outside the village and successfully repelled the attack with the help of the villagers. The song celebrates the bravery of the village residents and their determination to protect their home from any invaders.

Sirtos, a seven-beat dance, danced by men and women. The hold is W-shaped with the hands going down on the 6th and 7th steps and going up on the 8th and 9th. It is always sung and danced during the celebration of the Holy Apostles, as well as at the feasts held in the square.

=== Food ===
The diet of the village residents, in the past, was simple and mainly included legumes, dried beans and green beans, chickpeas, lentils, peas, and fava beans. Pasta preparations such as couscous, bulgur, and gioufkades (noodles) were also common. For visitors, they made mikikia (doughnuts), laggites (crepes), and paskalitses (popcorn). The meat they ate was mostly from their own animals: chickens, pork, which they preserved in clay pots, lambs, and sheep, while their bread was always homemade and baked in stone ovens in their yards.

=== Phrases and Proverbs ===
In Metaxades, they use the expression "he does it like a Toukmakiotis, like a Metaxadiotis" to describe a specific way of doing something, with clothes, dance, or cooking.

Proverb	Meaning	Source
"With a small child, don't start on your way, if your cart breaks, they laugh, if theirs breaks, they cry".	"Don't associate with someone unlike you".	
"Exile is heavier than death".	Expresses the deep sorrow and pain caused by the separation from one's homeland and loved ones, underlining that the nostalgia and loneliness of foreignness is more painful than death itself.	
"Water sleeps, a bad man does not".	Suggests that while water may be calm and still ("asleep"), the bad man remains restless and active, unable to find peace.	
"Whoever goes around, arrives faster".	Suggests that in some cases, choosing a longer-term or indirect route may lead to a faster or more effective achievement of the goal, as opposed to a direct approach.	
"Knocks on doors so the lintels can hear".	Suggests that when one wishes to achieve something or to proceed with an action, one must make noise or attract attention to be noticed or to attract interest.	
"Better late than never".	It's better to do something late than never.	
"Mili people".	Translates to "A lot of people".	
"The hen drinks water and looks at God".	Suggests that when one enjoys something or benefits from a situation, one should not forget to be grateful.	
"White wolves, black wolves, it's the same".	Suggests that, despite external differences or changes in appearance, the essence or nature of a person or situation remains the same.	

== Architecture ==
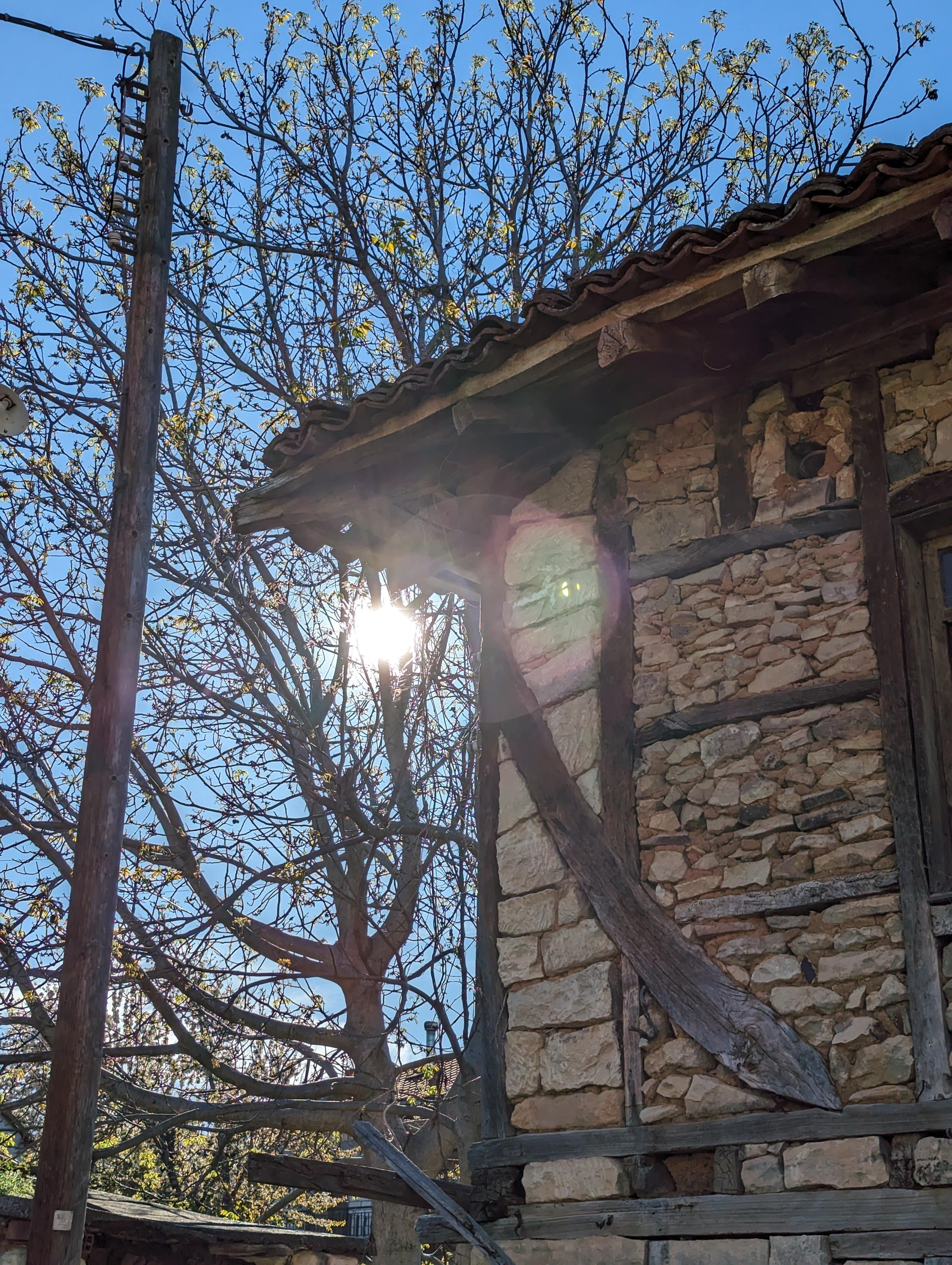
An old house built using the unique traditional architecture of Metaxades

In the traditional architecture of Thrace, stones are used as invisible, highly durable building materials. Traditional Thracian architecture, particularly in residential design, incorporates features reminiscent of ancient Greek and Byzantine periods. These include a southern orientation, the preference for building on sloping plots rather than in depressions, and a focus on maintaining an open "right of view". The layout of traditional houses, often centered around an inner courtyard defined by surrounding structures, carries symbolic and functional significance beyond security. The term "enclosure" reflects the ancient concept of "embracing" the environment, associated with health, well-being, and harmonious living.

In the case of Metaxades, the zeolitic tuff used in local stonemasonry art allowed traditional stone structures to stand out due to their craftsmanship. The high aesthetic result led to the rapid advancement of building art and the creation of rare constructions and architectural ensembles in the area. At the same time, the craftsmen of Metaxades emerged as unparalleled stonemasons throughout Evros.

It's a settlement where the popular form of the most characteristic industrial buildings of Thrace was created. These buildings are the koukoulospita (cocoon houses) made for housing families and hosting sericulture as a homemade activity. These residencies did not have any particularities but inside them housing was restricted and the traditional chagiati (roofed balcony) was a big hall with wooden piers. The traditional architecture of Metaxades is based on a particular way of building with carefully made wooden frameworks filled with big well assorted pieces of soft zeolitic tuff, often mistaken for limestone, a characteristic that was preserved until the third decade of the 20th century, with morphological unity and solid stone constructions added to the traditional ones of the beginnings of the 20th century.

The stonemasonry art of Metaxades represents a production chain, from the zeolitic tuff quarries to daily life, operating continuously, at least since the 19th century. It exemplifies sustainable practices and the organization of the local economy, combining locally abundant, high-quality raw materials with the craftsmanship of local artisans, kept alive for centuries. Transforming the area's rare resource, the zeolite-bearing tuff stone, into a specialized, recognized high-quality product, the famous "houses of Metaxades", through stonemasonry has instilled a sense of pride in the residents. This has, in turn, been vividly reflected in the local folk culture (arts, songs, customs, etc.).

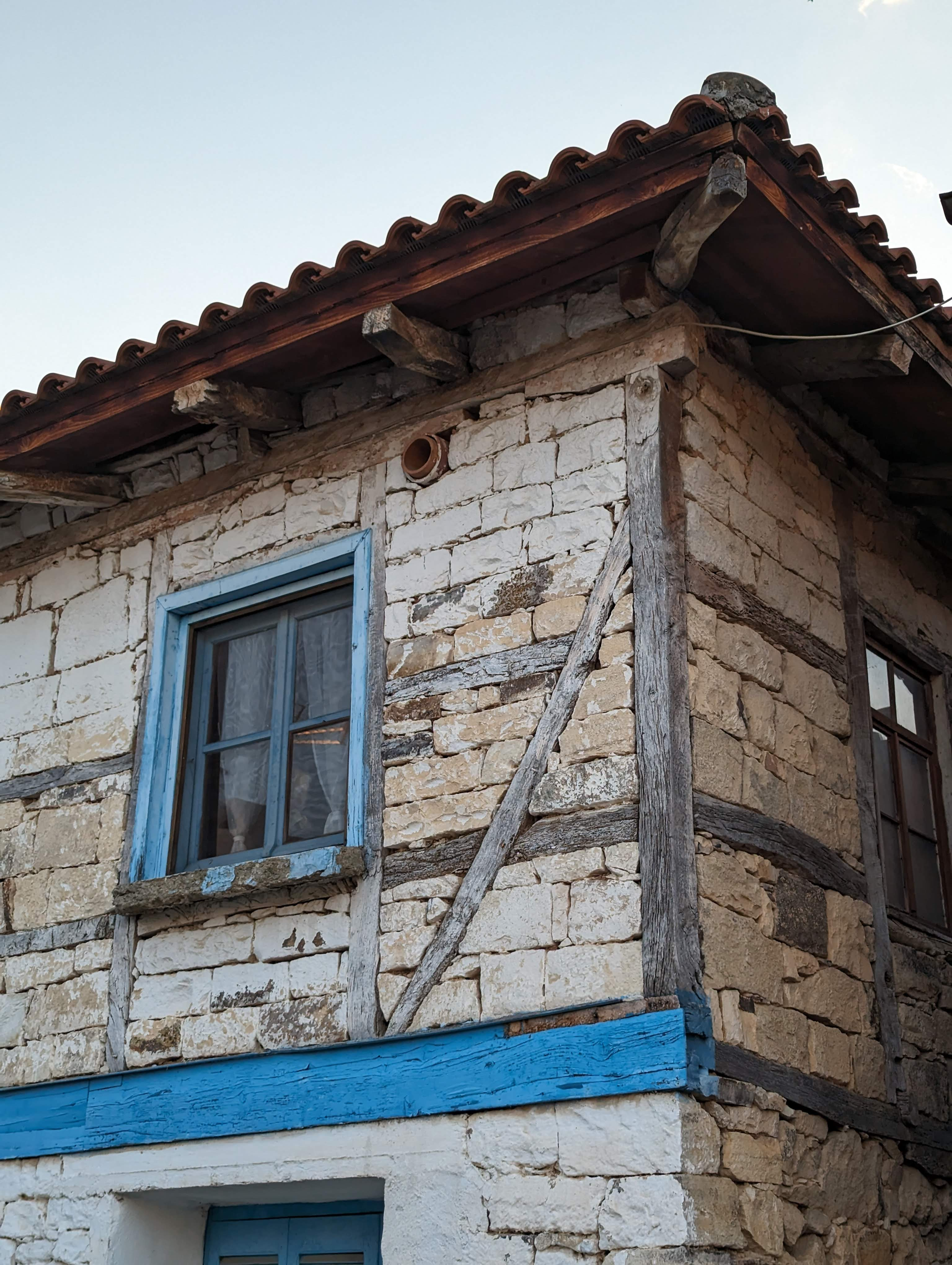
A house featuring traditional characteristics of the architecture of Metaxades

Architectural Characteristics

Thracian houses from the Ottoman occupation typically feature flat-fronted designs with semi-open and closed private spaces arranged in two parallel zones. A defining element is the loggia, a semi-open space similar to the ancient Greek pastada or prostada. In two-story houses, the upper-level loggia often mirrors the Byzantine doxatos, characterized by rows of small arches between columns. The hagiati, a semi-open space, also appears frequently, adapting to climate variations, in colder regions, it is enclosed with a series of windows to regulate sunlight throughout the year. Enclosed balconies (sahnisia) serve a similar bioclimatic purpose.

Interior spaces typically lack movable furniture, instead relying on built-in structures, such as L- or P-shaped seating along the walls beneath windows. This design reflects ancient Greek traditions prioritizing comfort for reclining rather than sitting, influencing the positioning and dimensions of windows and other architectural features.

Construction Techniques

Thracian architecture employs mixed construction techniques. Stone is commonly used for the main structure, while upper floors and walls often consist of chatma, a composite of plastered woven branches or wooden bars reinforced with lime mortar and organic materials such as straw or goat hair.

=== Historical Background ===
The traditional art of quarrying, carving, and processing zeolitic tuff, the stone from which the characteristic houses of the settlement are built, is characteristically reflected in the original traditional name of the settlement: Tokmakköy. Tokmakköy referred to the hammer of the stonemasons, the craftsmen of the stone from which the characteristic houses of the settlement are built. Its newer name, Metaxades, came after the population exchange from the widely spread sericulture in the area at that time.

The stonemasonry art of Metaxades appears to be centuries-old but has been passed down in the wider region through guilds. The primary connection of Metaxades with the construction art of Bulgaria, as a source of know-how and a place of apprenticeship in the early 20th century, is mentioned as Mandritsa, a settlement in the Rhodope mountain range, west of Didymoteicho, 2 kilometers within Bulgarian territory with a bilingual population (Greeks from Souli and Arvanites). However, Mandritsa was widely recognized as a village with a strong tradition in brick-making rather than stonemasonry.

Residents of Metaxades claim that the buildings constructed in the late 19th and early 20th centuries were built by Greek master carpenters, known as dolgers, from Ortakoy in Thrace, the present-day Ivaylovgrad in Bulgaria. It is known that the guilds of the area were top-notch in their field. The center of know-how since the 18th century is said to have been the settlement Bratsigovo, a small town in southern Bulgaria, on the foothills of the Rhodope mountains. The reason this settlement developed specialized know-how is said to be the relocation of about 150 families from Kosturska in northern Macedonia in the 18th century, who brought their unique craft and made the small settlement a significant construction hub. In this area, along with the craft, a secret professional language developed, including over 700 terms describing the most important practical and technical aspects related to their well-guarded trade secrets.

The stonemasons (petrades) formed a society of family businesses with great expertise. These craftsmen secured contracts for constructing the most important buildings in the wider region. They built significant monuments in the area, such as churches, bridges, and simpler buildings.

=== The Quarries of Metaxades ===
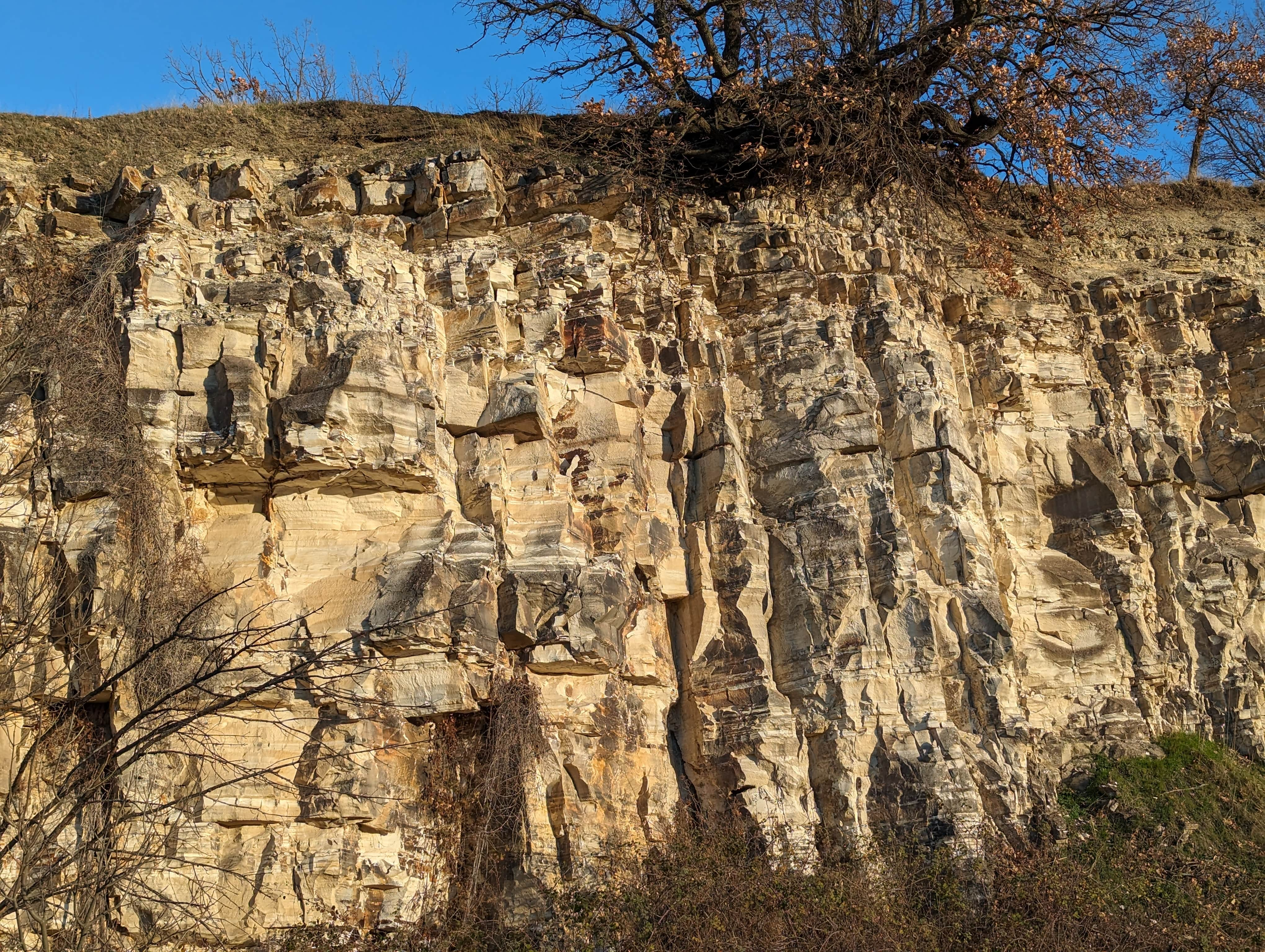
The Quarry in Metaxades, source of the local zeolitic tuff

The art of quarrying, rough carving, and processing the local zeolitic tuff was practiced until 2010 in two places: on-site at the quarry in the Gourounorema-Xerovouni Avdellas-Metaxades area and in stone carving and processing workshops on the outskirts of the quarry area. The stone was transported from the quarry, previously by carts and now by small trucks. Close to the quarry, the workshop facilities, where Dimitrios Piperoudis, the last permanent stonemason of the quarry, worked until 2010, still exist. He processed the rock masses into cuboid stones. In the same facilities, stonemason Apostolos Merkezoudis, known by the nickname Agas, worked until 2006 and died in 2013.

Additionally, George Kourbetoudis, a resident of Metaxades who experienced both the earlier phase of using stones as a young man with his father's traditional guild and the more advanced modern phase during which he carved stones and cladded dozens of buildings in the area, mentioned that traditionally, one or more people worked permanently in the quarry in summer and autumn, extracting and roughly processing the stone. These professionals were also called stonemasons, but their work differed from those working in construction. Today, due to lower demand for stone, extraction is not done by a permanent professional but by the local builder of the new generation of Metaxades who wants to procure material for his personal contract.

The surviving installation is a makeshift structure with a wooden frame approximately 3x3 meters, covered with a reed mat on three sides, later replaced by nylon. The aim was to protect from the sun in summer and the rain in autumn, the seasons when intensive quarrying took place. Notably, next to the workshop facilities, covered piles of rocks in various processing stages are still preserved. Today, as building methods have changed, the stones are cut into smaller and thinner pieces as cladding material.

=== The Architecture of the Houses ===
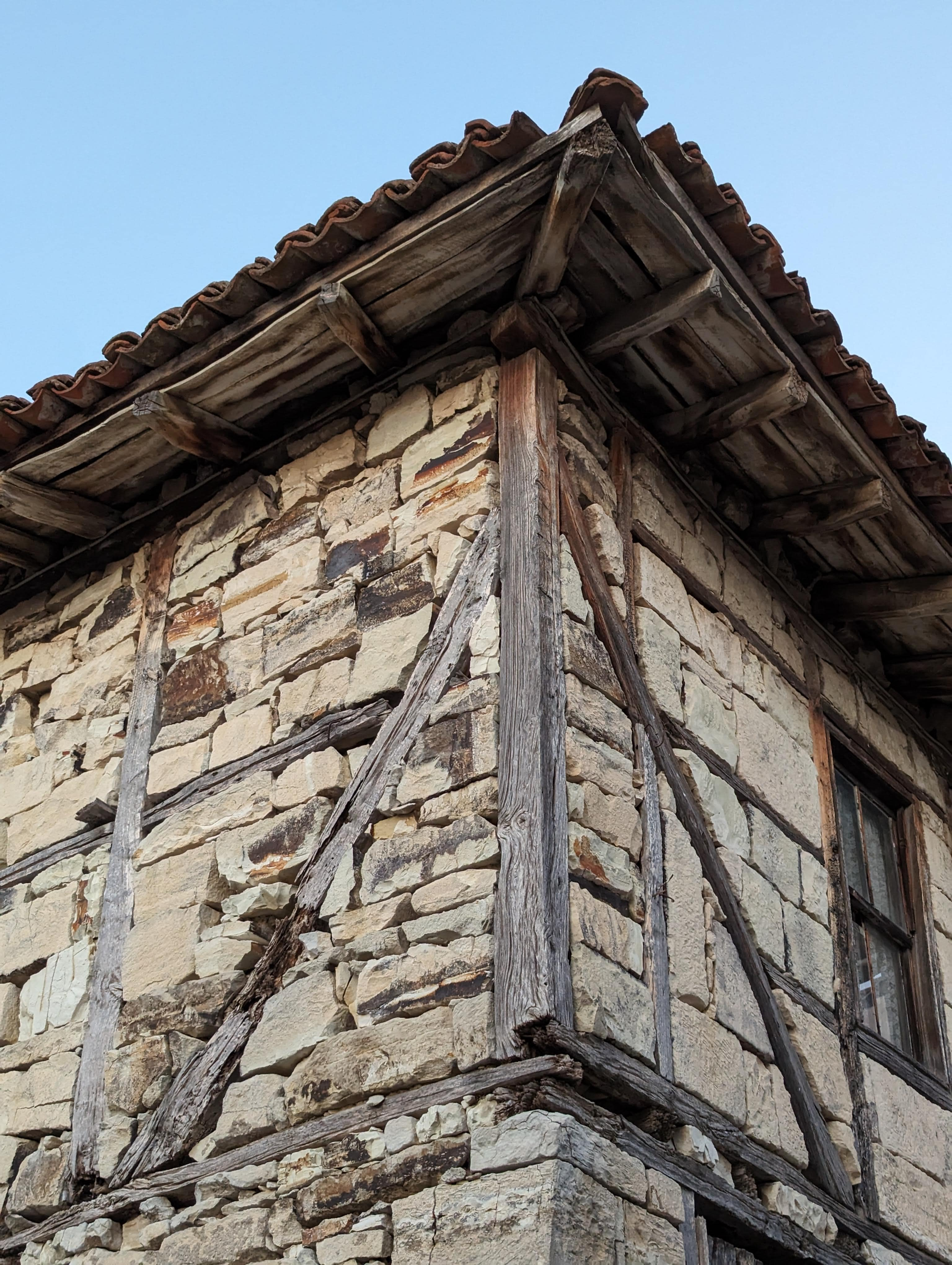
A side view of a traditional house in Metaxades

Constructed primarily using the local zeolitic tuff, the traditional architecture of the village of Metaxades reflects its historical and cultural heritage, with most houses dating back to the 19th century. These two-storey structures are built with solid masonry but lack the fortress-like characteristics seen in other parts of the valley. Unlike the austere, solid surfaces with small openings typical of fortified architecture, the houses in Metaxades display a distinct elegance and grace. This aesthetic is achieved through the alternating use of stone and wood, which forms geometric patterns, including triangles, squares, and parallelograms, on the walls. Occasionally, curved wooden elements appear, particularly at the wall ends, adding decorative accents and enhancing structural cohesion.

One notable feature of Metaxades architecture is the absence of balconies, which suggests that the village's older residents preferred socializing in the local cafés rather than in private outdoor spaces. Similarly, the chachnissia, a type of enclosed wooden balcony common in some regions, are rare in Metaxades, with only one small example observed in the village.

The window openings are relatively large and follow a strict geometric alignment. These windows are safeguarded by robust iron railings, while the tiled roofs extend outward, ending in wide protective cornices. The masonry itself is particularly distinctive due to the zeolitic tuff stone used and the traditional construction techniques employed. The stone, sourced from nearby quarries, ranges in color from off-white to yellowish and serves as the primary building material. The stones are expertly cut into rectangular or square shapes, depending on the specific structural requirements. They are so precisely fitted that lime mortar is often unnecessary, a method reminiscent of the ancient Greek isodomic masonry seen in historic circular walls across Greece.

In some economically modest structures, irregularly shaped stones were used. However, their outer surfaces were still carefully worked to ensure smoothness, reflecting the skill and experience of the local stonemasons. Many of these traditional houses are notably large, a feature associated with the village's historical silk industry. The expansive upper floors of these houses were used for feeding silkworms, an activity that once flourished in Metaxades. This silk-related heritage is also echoed in the village's former name, "Toniomani", which translates to "hammer of the stonemasons", highlighting the significance of local quarrying and masonry skills in the community's history.

==== Exterior Design ====
The designation of the village as a traditional settlement is mainly due to the unique architecture of its buildings. This architecture resembles that of Epirus (Zagoria) and Northwestern Macedonia, as it is not found elsewhere in Eastern Macedonia and Thrace. The master builder had the main directive for construction. For the foundation, hard stone from Paliouri was used. The stones were placed in rows of equal size with minimal mud mortar in between. The cornerstones of the building had specific names: Gonies were the stones at the edges of the walls, and the antigoni was the first stone after the corner. A rarer element during construction was the gibgir, meaning the arch.

The work of the dolgers was initially the most important as they set up the wooden frame of the building, its structural carrier. In Metaxades, the dolgers' craft evolved as the wooden frame of the buildings incorporated expertly carved stones, replacing typical wall materials, such as bricks, bagdati, and chatma. The unique building art of Metaxades gradually developed its own terminology, slightly different from the typical traditional one. According to this, the main elements of the timber framing were the tirekia, the vertical posts, and the baentas, the diagonal wood.

Today, Metaxades has been designated as a traditional architectural settlement, with specific obligations for residents regarding the design of new houses and their construction, using the local zeolitic tuff from the nearby quarry.

==== Interior Design ====
The use of stone as an external decorative and insulating element, the use of wooden transoms, and the oblique projection of the upper floor (the so-called "hayati") are the peculiarities of the Metaxades house with two floors and many rooms. The ground floor was used according to the profession of the owner (e.g., café or stable). The building was airy and bright due to the abundance of windows and spacious because space was needed for the processing and storage of silk. This process took place on the upper floor, which could be accessed via an internal or external staircase. At the edges of the floor were the rooms, while in the middle was the main space for silk production. The combination of beauty and practicality characterizes both the buildings and their inhabitants.

Today, the craft has been passed down from the older to the younger builders, who know well the entire production chain, even though the construction system throughout Greece is now based on reinforced concrete. The stonemason's art continues to be a living craft. Almost all modern houses in Metaxades are externally clad with the craftsmanship of local stonemasons. Contemporary local craftsmen assure that their stone is excellent for interiors, using it for internal cladding and fireplaces. The stone also has demand in other areas.

=== Categories of houses in the village ===
The main feature of the house of Metaxades is the "two-story stone" house. If we look at the houses in the village that exist until today, we will divide them into four categories:

==== The old stone house ====
Two-story house built of stone from the quarries of Metaxades. At the bottom of the house there was a small hallway, a room next to which there was the warehouse and on the opposite side the barn. The inner staircase led to the upper floor where there was the "haiati" (large living room) and two other rooms and at the back there was the "samalouka" (barn). These houses were built by craftsmen of the village who carved the stone. Each stone was glued to the other with mud (soil and straw). Between the stones they placed thick wood to tie the house and make it earthquake-proof. The floor upstairs was Wooden. The windows, doors are all wooden, with oak wood from the forest of the village. Apart from the craftsmen, almost the whole village helped with the construction. In the foundations, a rooster was always slaughtered, and when they reached the roof, the master builder made a wreath of flowers and shouted a wish for all those who brought a gift. The interiors were designed to serve all needs (sleep, storage, cocoons, Animals, engagements, weddings).

==== The refugee house ====
In 1922, after the Asia Minor catastrophe, the refugees who came to the village built their own neighborhood with their own architecture. Their houses were smaller and built with "birch" (mud with straw, dried in the sun and made like stone). From the outside, they were smeared with mud (soil, manure) so that they would not get corroded by the rain.

==== The newer house ====
After 1950 the houses were built with the same architecture as the old ones, but with a better layout and instead of wood inside the wall cement was used. Such houses are quite preserved in the village today and give a special beauty.

==== The modern house ====
In recent years, the houses being built are made of Bricks with modern designs and all the comforts. Each house was built on a large plot of land. The plot used to be blocked by dry grass. In the yard there was the oven that needed a lot of work and art to build. Outside the yard was the toilet, made of wood. At one end were the woods for winter and summer. In the yard there was also the "kmasi" (place for the pig). If there were sheep or Goats, there was the "mantri-saia". The Animals that were in the stable were the oxen for plowing, the cows, the buffalo, the donkeys and in the yard they surrounded the dog, the cat, the hens, the ducks, the little pigs.

== Environment ==
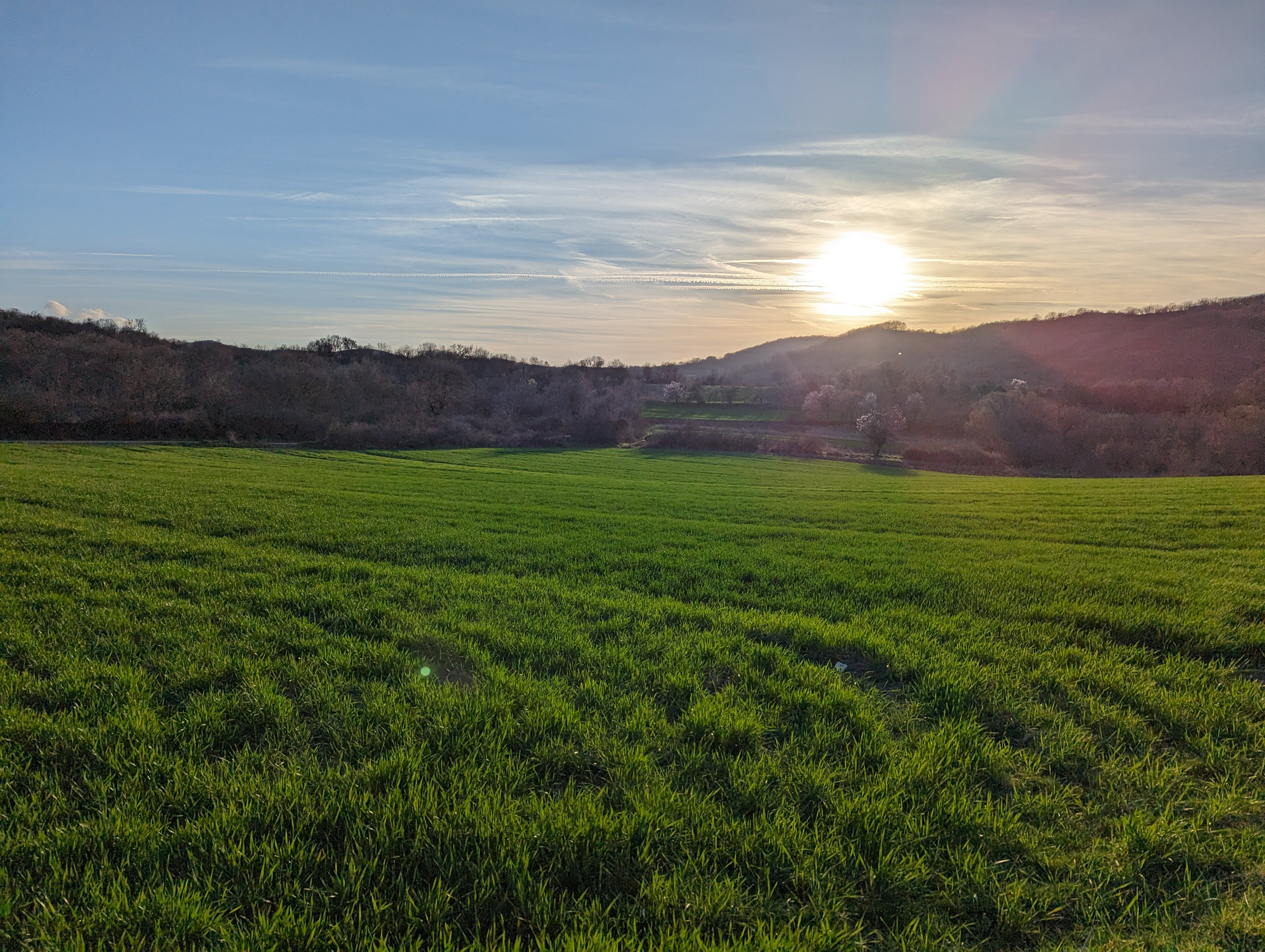
A field near the quarry of Metaxades

The forest of Metaxades is home to a variety of wildlife, including mammals, birds, and reptiles. Commonly seen animals include rabbits, foxes, and other small mammals, while larger species such as deer and wild boar are occasionally observed. One of the key priorities for the current municipal administration of Metaxades is to develop a portion of the forest into a controlled hunting area of national importance. Mayors have expressed support over the years for the establishment of a game reserve, which he believes will boost tourism and stimulate the local economy.

In addition to traditional uses such as firewood production, alternative forest management strategies include the development of recreational areas and ecotourism trails. These initiatives, combined with the scenic landscapes of Erythropotamos, offer potential for hiking and nature tourism, attracting visitors and providing opportunities for the local community. These efforts aim to counteract the region's population decline, which has reached 25% in the past decade.

A forest trail of approximately 18 kilometers leads to the settlement of Mikros Dereio. Just before reaching the village, travelers cross an old military bridge spanning a branch of the Erythropotamos River. This section of the river, originating from the forested slopes of the Greek Eastern Rhodope, joins with the part of the river that flows from Bulgaria. The river then passes through the extensive plain of Metaxades, traverses the peaks near Didymoteicho, and ultimately reaches the Evros River.

=== General information ===
The area of Metaxades does not have any particularly important bird habitats and few bird species nest within its boundaries. However, several species that nest in the nearby forests, such as those of Dadia, tend to visit the area for foraging, mainly including vultures such as the black vulture and the vulture.

The natural landscape of the area includes the Erythropotamos valley and the surrounding wooded hills, which are used by many species of birds for wintering. The location of the area on a migratory route also makes it a destination for many migratory species, especially ostriches, which stop there for a few hours or days.

In the cultivated zones around Metaxades, characterized by the absence of hedgerows, there is no significant nesting, but they are widely used by wintering bird species. Adjacent woodlands also attract many species of foraging raptors, while oak woodlands are used by migratory ostriches due to the location and low elevation of the area.

Finally, during the spring and autumn, the riparian forests of the Erythropotamos host a variety of herons and storks, especially when the river waters recede significantly.

=== Abiotic factors ===
==== Soil ====
The predominant soil type in the area is sandy clay loam. In a small area, the soil is degraded, and gravel surfaces appear.

==== Subsoil ====
Along the Erythropotamos valley, there are Quaternary deposits of mixed phases (clay silts, sands, and gravels). On either sid valley, the area is geologically structured by Neogene sedimentary formations, with intense, localized water-bearing capacity.

=== Climate ===
The cold and wet period lasts from late October to mid April and the warm, moderately dry period from mid April to late September, with transitional phases in between. The record lowest temperature ever in Metaxades is −12.4 °C (9.7 °F), recorded during the Early 2012 European Cold wave. The record highest is 40.8 °C (105.4 °F) .

==== Climate type ====
Metaxades and the surrounding villages have a hot-summer Mediterranean climate (Köppen climate classification: Csa) with humid subtropical (Cfa) influences due to the lack of a distinct dry season. It has 4 distinct seasons: winter, spring, summer and autumn. Based on the indications of the Didymoteicho weather station, the climate in the area is classified as subhumid with a cold winter.

==== Temperature ====
The cold and wet period lasts from late October to mid April and the warm, moderately dry period from mid April to late September, with transitional phases in between. The record lowest temperature ever in Metaxades is −12.4 °C (9.7 °F), recorded during the Early 2012 European Cold wave. The record highest is 40.8 °C (105.4 °F) .

Climate data for Metaxades, 2010–present (normals & extremes)
Month	Jan	Feb	Mar	Apr	May	Jun	Jul	Aug	Sep	Oct	Nov	Dec	Year
Record high °C (°F)	19.6 (67.3)	24.1 (75.4)	24.8 (76.6)	32.6 (90.7)	34.7 (94.5)	38.7 (101.7)	40.8 (105.4)	40.5 (104.9)	38.7 (101.7)	32.1 (89.8)	25.4 (77.7)	22.5 (72.5)	40.8 (105.4)
Mean daily maximum °C (°F)	7.9 (46.2)	10.4 (50.7)	14.1 (57.4)	19.9 (67.8)	25.2 (77.4)	29.4 (84.9)	32.7 (90.9)	33.2 (91.8)	28.1 (82.6)	20.2 (68.4)	15.2 (59.4)	9.8 (49.6)	20.5 (68.9)
Daily mean °C (°F)	4.0 (39.2)	6.1 (43.0)	9.0 (48.2)	13.7 (56.7)	18.7 (65.7)	22.9 (73.2)	25.8 (78.4)	26.2 (79.2)	21.4 (70.5)	14.9 (58.8)	11.0 (51.8)	6.0 (42.8)	15.0 (59.0)
Mean daily minimum °C (°F)	0.8 (33.4)	2.4 (36.3)	4.5 (40.1)	8.4 (47.1)	13.2 (55.8)	17.4 (63.3)	19.6 (67.3)	20.1 (68.2)	15.9 (60.6)	10.6 (51.1)	7.5 (45.5)	2.6 (36.7)	10.3 (50.5)
Record low °C (°F)	−12.0 (10.4)	−12.4 (9.7)	−8.4 (16.9)	1.6 (34.9)	5.2 (41.4)	10.7 (51.3)	13.6 (56.5)	14.3 (57.7)	7.3 (45.1)	1.9 (35.4)	−3.7 (25.3)	−8.0 (17.6)	−12.4 (9.7)
Average precipitation mm (inches)	109.6 (4.31)	67.5 (2.66)	63.7 (2.51)	50.4 (1.98)	43.4 (1.71)	46.5 (1.83)	34.2 (1.35)	23.4 (0.92)	33.9 (1.33)	84.3 (3.32)	68.3 (2.69)	78.3 (3.08)	703.5 (27.70)
Source: meteo.gr

===== Historical data =====
For the period 1936–40 and 1957–1975, based on the data from the Didymoteicho weather station, the absolute minimum temperature was −17.5 °C, the absolute maximum was 42.4 °C, the average minimum was 8.8 °C, the average maximum was 18.9 °C, and the average annual was 14.1 °C.

====== Rainfall ======
In the Metaxades area, the average annual rainfall for the period 1955–1981 was 799 mm, the maximum average was 1182 mm, and the minimum average was 442 mm.

====== Winds ======
For the measurement period 1958–1970, the prevailing winds are from the north, with a frequency of 39.2%, and the calm percentage is 4.2%.

==== Frost and snowfall ====
Frosts are observed from mid-November to the end of March. The average number of snowy days in the Didymoteicho area is 16.2, with a snow height of 10–12 cm.

==== Sunshine ====
The maximum sunshine is recorded in July and August, and the minimum in December to February. The maximum sunshine recorded at the prefecture level reaches 70%–85% in the summer months, which is the season with the greatest radiation benefit. The minimum is recorded in the autumn and winter months, ranging from 30% to 60%.

=== Waters ===
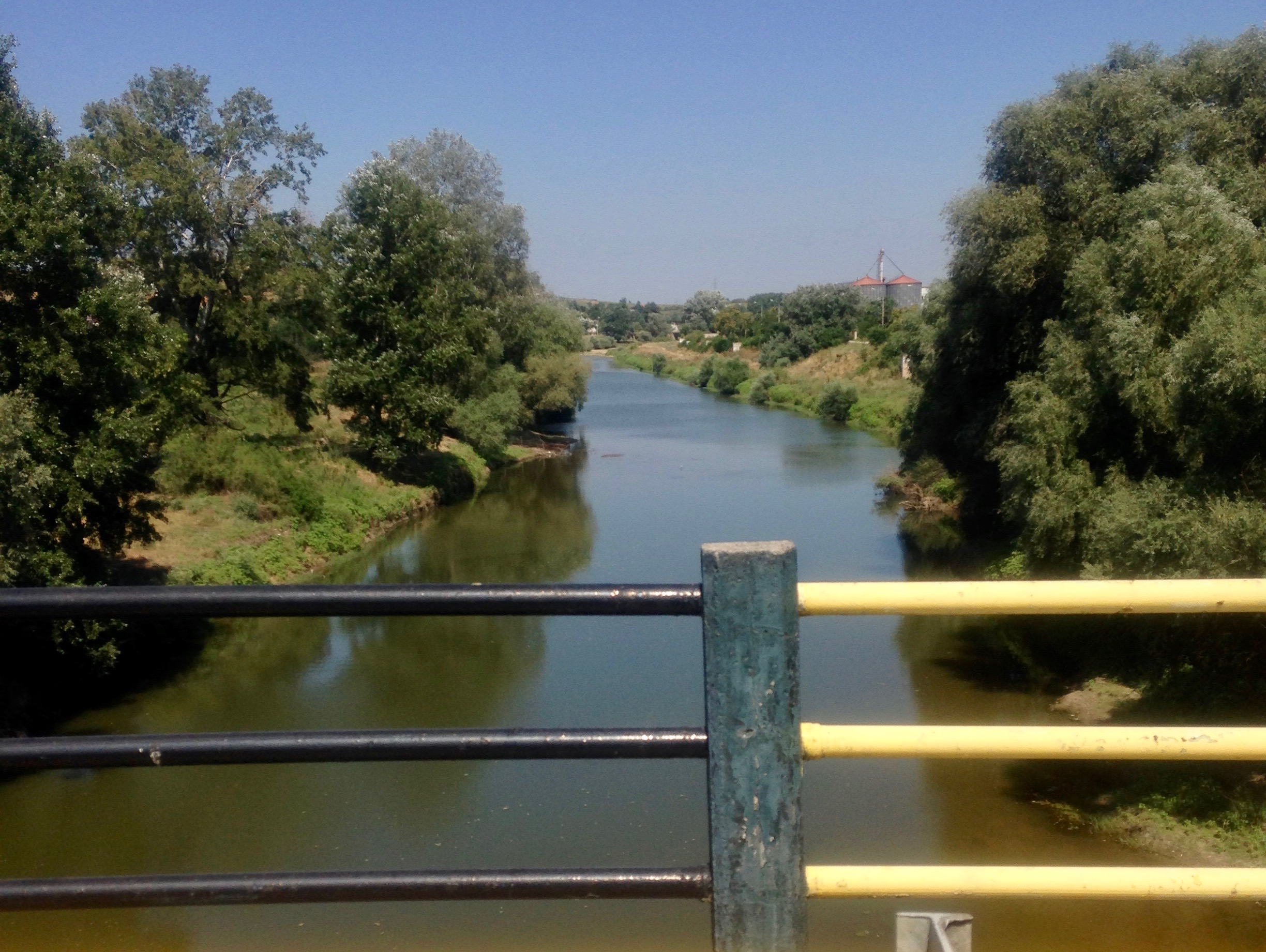
The Erythropotamos river

==== Surface ====
In the area, there is the Erythropotamos river, one of the main tributaries of the Evros river. The Erythropotamos originates from the hills of Korfovouni (N. Evros) and Mati (N. Rhodope), crosses the Evros prefecture towards the northeast, and north of the Mikro Dereio settlement, at a distance of 7 kilometers, it forms the Greece-Bulgaria border for 3 kilometers. It then crosses Bulgarian territory for 5 kilometers and re-enters Greek territory, forming the Greece-Bulgaria border for 12 kilometers up to the village of Metaxades. Then, changing direction eastward, it crosses the Didymoteicho province for 33 kilometers until its confluence with the Evros river.

The river is accompanied by several smaller streams that traverse the plain. To protect the valley from flooding, raised embankments have been constructed along the riverbanks. These embankments are designed to provide flood protection, even during periods of heavy rainfall, and were deemed essential following past disastrous floods caused by the river.

The upper section of the embankments is flat, creating a rural road that is easily accessible and offers access to both the riverbanks and surrounding farmland. This road stretches for several kilometers along both sides of the river, providing an excellent route for touring by car or on foot. The winding course of the river across the plain offers continuously changing landscapes, providing a unique experience for visitors. The scenery at any given spot varies with the time of day, offering distinct views in the early morning, at midday, or in the evening light.

At the height of Metaxades, the tributaries Bellas, Akche Hisar, and Akalansko Dere, located in Bulgarian territory, contribute to the Erythropotamos.

The average annual discharge of the Erythropotamos at the Mikro Dereio bridge for the period 1973–1982 was 5 m^{3}/sec, the minimum average monthly discharge was observed during July – September, while during December–March the discharge was 8–14 m^{3}/sec.

==== Groundwater ====
The Erythropotamos valley exhibits significant quantities of groundwater. Due to the nature of the bedrock of the basin, which is impermeable, there is no communication with the neighboring Evros river valley. The aquifer of the Erythropotamos valley can be considered a closed system, where the flow of the river to the aquifer occurs in autumn and winter, and vice versa in spring and summer.

Approximately 70 boreholes have been drilled in the area, irrigating 21,457 acres of agricultural land, with an average yield of 100 m^{3}/h.

=== Sub-Mediterranean zone ===
==== Subzone Quercion confertae ====
In the Metaxades area, the Quercion confertae subzone appears, with the growth space Quercetum confertae. The dominant tree species are various species of oak, while in some degraded or barren locations, evergreen broad-leaved species, with Phillyrea media being dominant, appear.

==== Cultivations ====
Cultivations in the area occupy its northern part, within the valley created by the Erythropotamos. Most of these areas are irrigated by boreholes. Small cultivated clearings appear within the forested areas, which are not irrigated.

==== Fallow land ====
In a large percentage of the area (approximately 10%), fallow land appears, resulting from the degradation of old forests and primarily used for livestock farming.

==== Forested areas ====
Along the course of the Erythropotamos, in the section west of Metaxades along the border, small-width riparian forests appear, consisting of various species of willow (Salix spp.) and alder (Alnus glutinosa). After the river enters Greece, north of Metaxades, all the riparian vegetation has been destroyed due to the river's embankment, and only isolated poplars (Populus spp.) and willows appear on the riverbanks.

In the semi-mountainous forested areas of the region, various oak species dominate. In the northern and wetter locations, Downy Oak (Quercus dalechampii) appears, while in drier locations, Hungarian Oak and Italian Oak (Q. frainetto & Q. pubescens) are found. Sporadically throughout the forested area, Turkey Oak (Q. cerris) is also present. Along with the oaks, many other deciduous broad-leaved species, such as ashes (Fraxinus spp.), maples (Acer spp.), and others, appear. In degraded and southern locations, there is a transition of the oak forest to evergreen broad-leaved formations. In these locations, the dominant tree and shrub species are Phillyrea media and Christ's thorn (Paliurus spina-christi). In a small area in partially forested areas, artificial reforestation with Black Pine (Pinus nigra subsp. pallasiana) has taken place.

=== Geology and mineral wealth ===
The Metaxades are characterized by volcaniclastic sediments of the Eocene that have undergone extensive zeolitic alteration. These sediments are mainly composed of clinoptilite and show a high cation exchange capacity. The area has been the subject of significant geological and geochemical studies, which highlight its complex volcanic history and the dynamic processes that lead to its unique mineral content. Oxygen isotope analyzes provide evidence for these alteration processes, indicating a history of significant geochemical change.

The Metaxades-Avdella area is part of the Orestias Tertiary molassic basin in northeastern Thrace, Greece. The basin extends into Bulgaria and is characterized by Eocene to Pleistocene age sediments deposited unconformably on the crystalline basement of the Rhodope massif. The Eocene formations in the Avdella area consist of grey siltstones, semi-loose sandstones, zeolite-bearing volcaniclastic tuffs, marly limestone, and fossil-rich limestone. Oligocene formations overlay the Eocene sediments, consisting of grey clays, red-yellowish sandstones, siltstones, and marly limestone. Quaternary sediments are deposited over all earlier formations, though not all formations are present at every site due to tectonic activity, erosion, or non-deposition. The alteration of mélange-hosted chromitites from Korydallos, Pindos ophiolite complex, Greece, also highlights the regional geological context. The peridotites in this area, including the Avdella mélange, show evidence of tectonic incorporation and ocean floor serpentinization before being incorporated into the mélange. This geological setting underscores the complex tectonic and sedimentary processes that have shaped the Avdella and Metaxades regions.

The Metaxades are notable for their unique mineral findings, including the presence of moissanite (SiC) within their zeolitic rocks. This rare mineral occurrence indicates an environment with unique geochemical conditions that favor the formation of such rare minerals. The general mineralogical composition also includes significant amounts of natural zeolites, which contribute to the remarkable geology of the area.

The zeolitic tuffs of Metaxades and the nearby area of Avdella show excellent ion exchange capacities, which have been extensively documented through local and international research. This feature is particularly important in environmental contexts, where these materials can be used to mitigate pollution and effectively restore the ecological balance. In addition, they are used as dimension stones in constructions, valued for their durability and aesthetic appearance. These materials have been an integral part of building and architectural projects in the region.

The volcanic history and dynamic geological processes of Metaxades have resulted in unique mineral compositions. The zeolitic tuffs in this region are primarily composed of HEU-type zeolite, feldspars, cristobalite, mica, clay minerals, and quartz. Specifically, the mineralogical composition includes approximately 53% HEU-type zeolite, 7% smectite, 4% mica, 16% feldspars, 12% cristobalite, and 8% quartz. The chemical composition is characterized by high silica content (72.3% SiO₂) and alumina (11.8% Al₂O₃), among other minor oxides. These materials have an average ion exchange capacity of 143 meq/100g, which is primarily attributed to the HEU-type zeolite.

These zeolitic tuffs are commonly used as dimension stones in the construction industry for building houses, churches, public buildings, stables, irrigation channels, and flood protection barriers. Their use in buildings helps maintain a cool environment in summer and warmth in winter, while in stables, they reduce ammonia and malodor. The high ion exchange capacity of these tuffs is positively correlated with the zeolite content, the total microporous minerals, the CaO content, and the loss on ignition.

The comprehensive examination and exploitation of the natural resources of Metaxades highlights their importance in the fields of geology, environmental science, and industry. Continued academic and practical interest in the region highlights its important role in contributing to sustainable environmental management practices and strategies globally.

The natural zeolitic materials of Metaxades have a variety of environmental and industrial applications. Studies have focused on the ability of Metaxades zeolites to remove heavy metals and radionuclides from aqueous solutions, making them valuable for water purification and environmental cleanup projects. Specific research has shown their effectiveness in caesium and uranium adsorption, which is vital for the management of radioactive waste and contaminated water sources.

=== Flora and Fauna in the Region ===
The Metaxades area is characterized by diverse forest ecosystems. The predominant tree species are various types of oak, with degraded or barren areas supporting evergreen broadleaved species, primarily Phillyrea media.

Riparian forests are present along the bed of Erythropotamos, particularly west of Metaxades, near the border. These forests are narrow and consist mainly of willows (Salix spp.) and alder (Alnus glutinosa). However, after the river enters Greece, north of Metaxades, most of the riparian vegetation has been destroyed due to the construction of dikes. As a result, only isolated poplars (Populus spp.) and willows remain along the banks.

In the semi-mountainous woodlands of the area, various oak species dominate. Quercus dalechampii (Apodisc oak) thrives in the northern, wetter areas, while drier sites support Q. frainetto (flat-leaved oak) and Q. pubescens (downy oak). Q. cerris (Euthyphlous oak) is also found sporadically throughout the forest. Other deciduous broadleaved species, such as ash (Fraxinus spp.) and maple (Acer spp.), are interspersed within the forest. In degraded southern locations, oak woodlands transition into patches of evergreen broadleaved vegetation, with Phillyrea media and Paliurus spina-christi being the dominant species.

Additionally, a small area has undergone artificial reforestation, featuring Pinus nigra subsp. pallasiana (Black Pine).

==== Flora ====
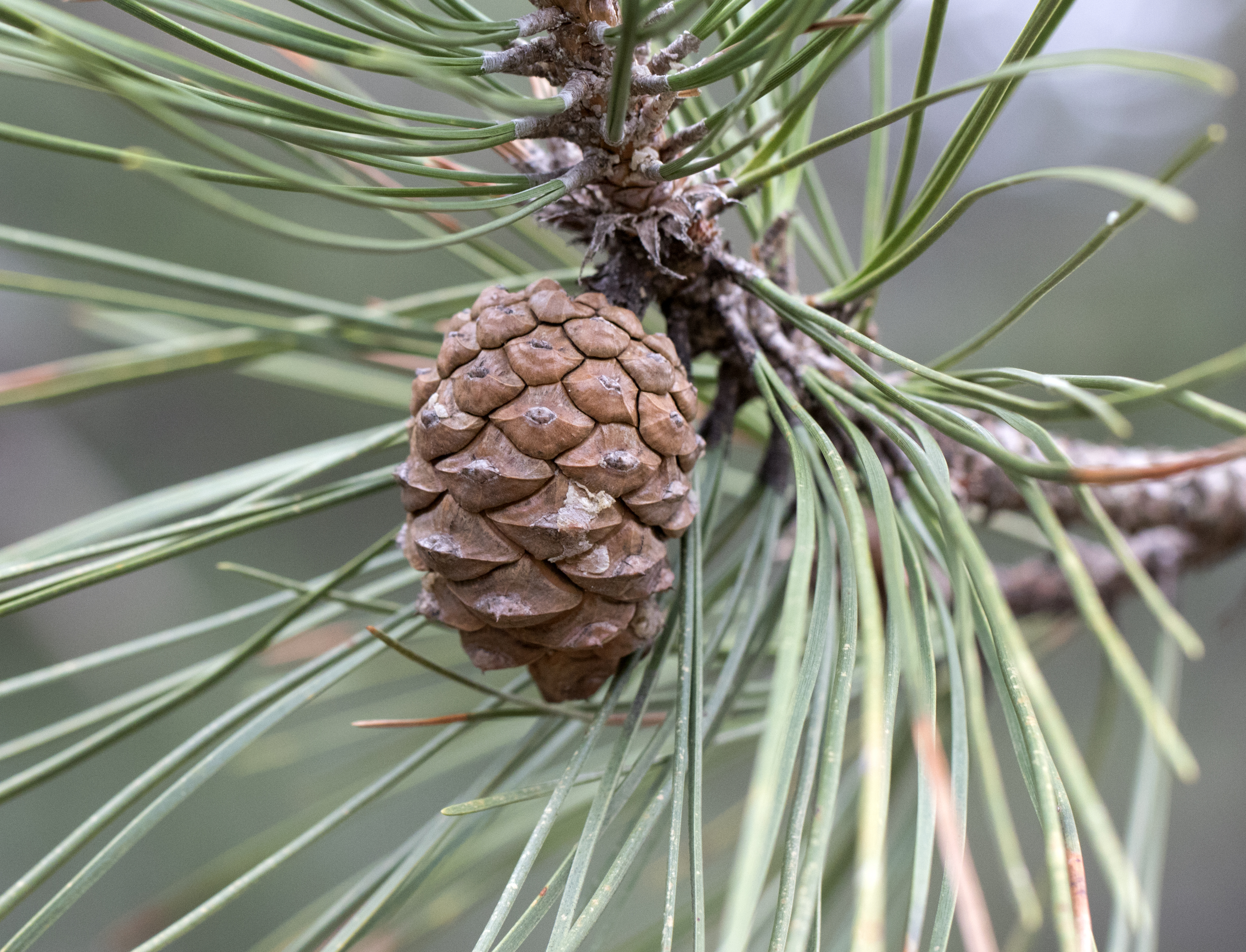
Pinus nigra, the tree that dominates the Metaxades hill

The region hosts a diverse range of plant species across multiple botanical families:

===== Pinaceae =====
- Pinus nigra (Black Pine)

===== Cupressaceae =====
- Juniperus oxycedrus (Prickly Juniper)
- Juniperus communis (Common Juniper)

===== Salicaceae =====
- Populus alba (White Poplar)
- Populus nigra (Black Poplar)
- Salix alba (White Willow)
- Salix xanthicola (Thracian Willow)

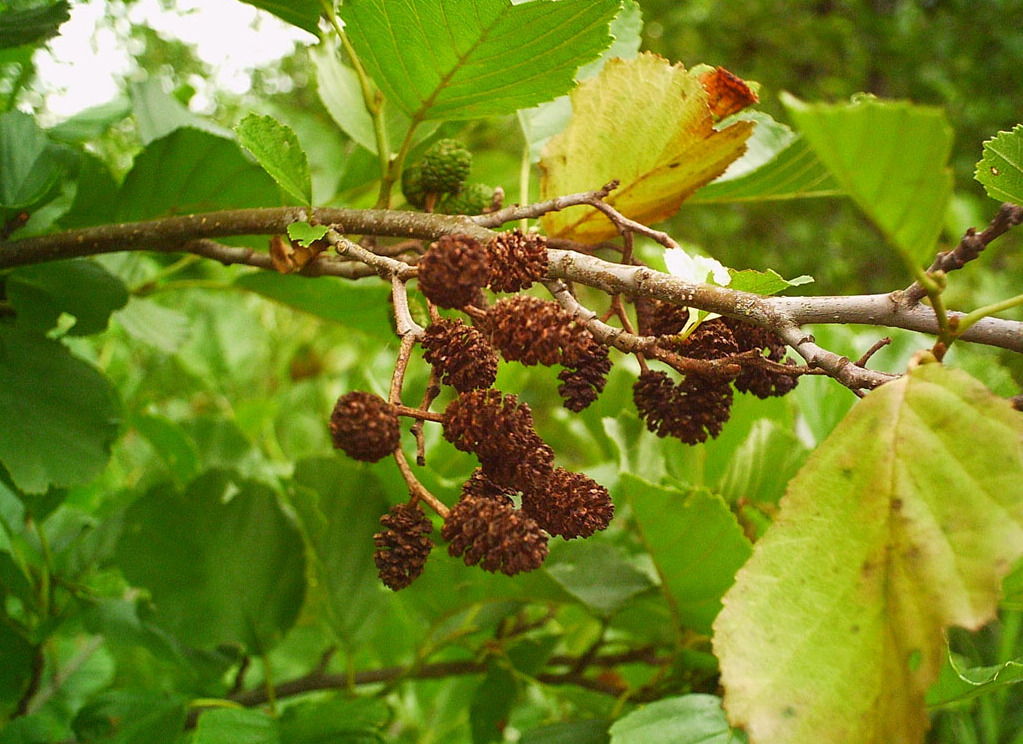
Alnus glutinosa

===== Betulaceae =====
- Alnus glutinosa (Black Alder)
- Carpinus orientalis (Oriental Hornbeam)
- Corylus colurna (Turkish Hazel)

===== Fagaceae =====
- Quercus frainetto (Hungarian Oak)
- Quercus dalechampii (Dalechamp's Oak)
- Quercus cerris (Turkey Oak)
- Quercus pubescens (Downy Oak)

===== Ulmaceae =====
- Ulmus minor (field elm)

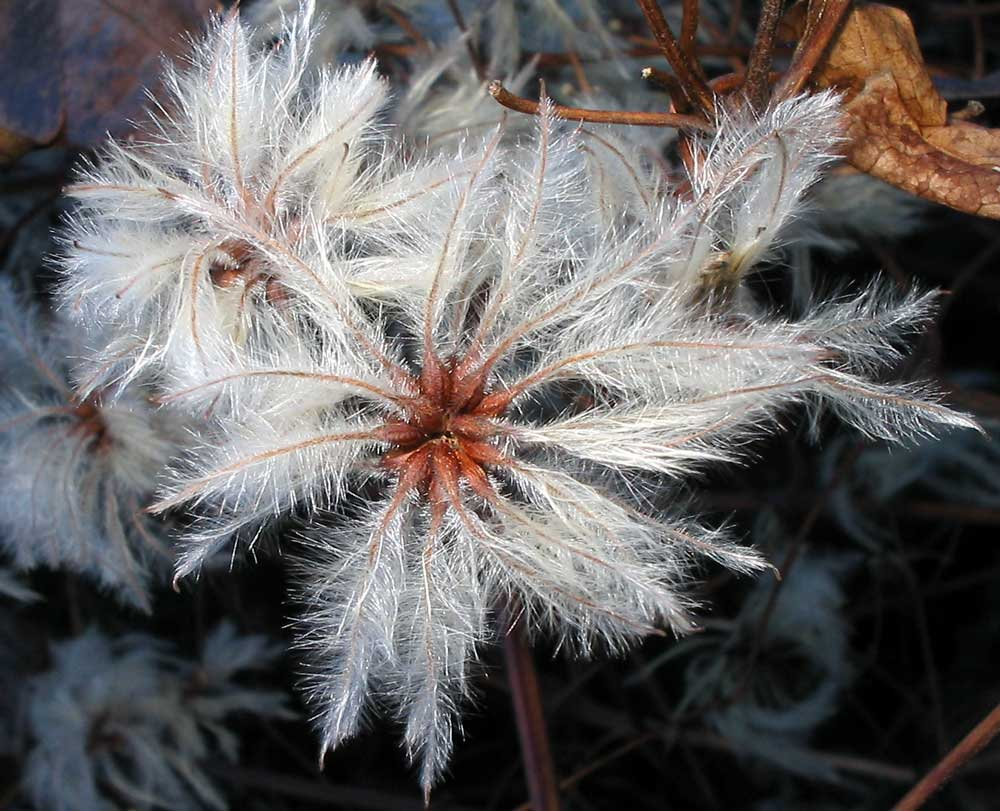
Clematis vitalba

===== Ranunculaceae =====
- Clematis vitalba (Old Man's Beard)

===== Platanaceae =====
- Platanus orientalis (Oriental Plane)

===== Rosaceae =====
- Rubus ulmifolius (Elmleaf Blackberry)
- Rosa canina (Dog Rose)
- Rosa gallica (French Rose)
- Pyrus amygdaliformis (Almond-leaved Pear)
- Pyrus caucasica (Common Pear)
- Pyrus pyraster (Wild Pear)
- Sorbus torminalis (Wild Service Tree)
- Crataegus monogyna (Hawthorn)
- Prunus cerasifera (Cherry Plum)
- Prunus spinosa (Blackthorn)

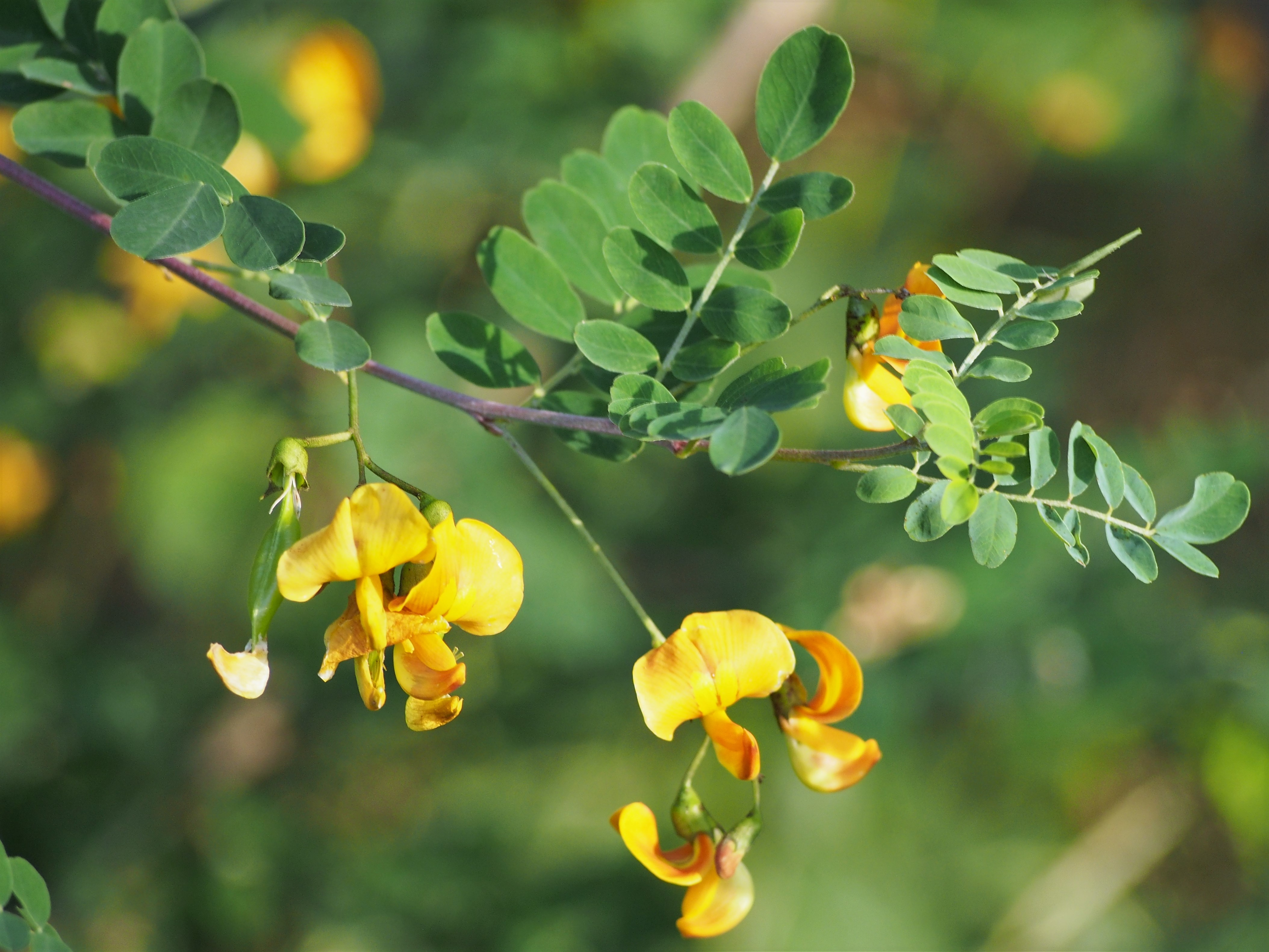
Colutea arborescens

===== Leguminosae (Fabaceae) =====
- Colutea arborescens (Bladder Senna)
- Coronilla emeroides (Shrubby Coronilla)
- Cercis siliquastrum (Judas Tree)

===== Anacardiaceae =====
- Pistacia terebinthus (Terebinth)
- Cotinus coggygria (Smoke Tree)
- Rhus coriaria (Sumac)

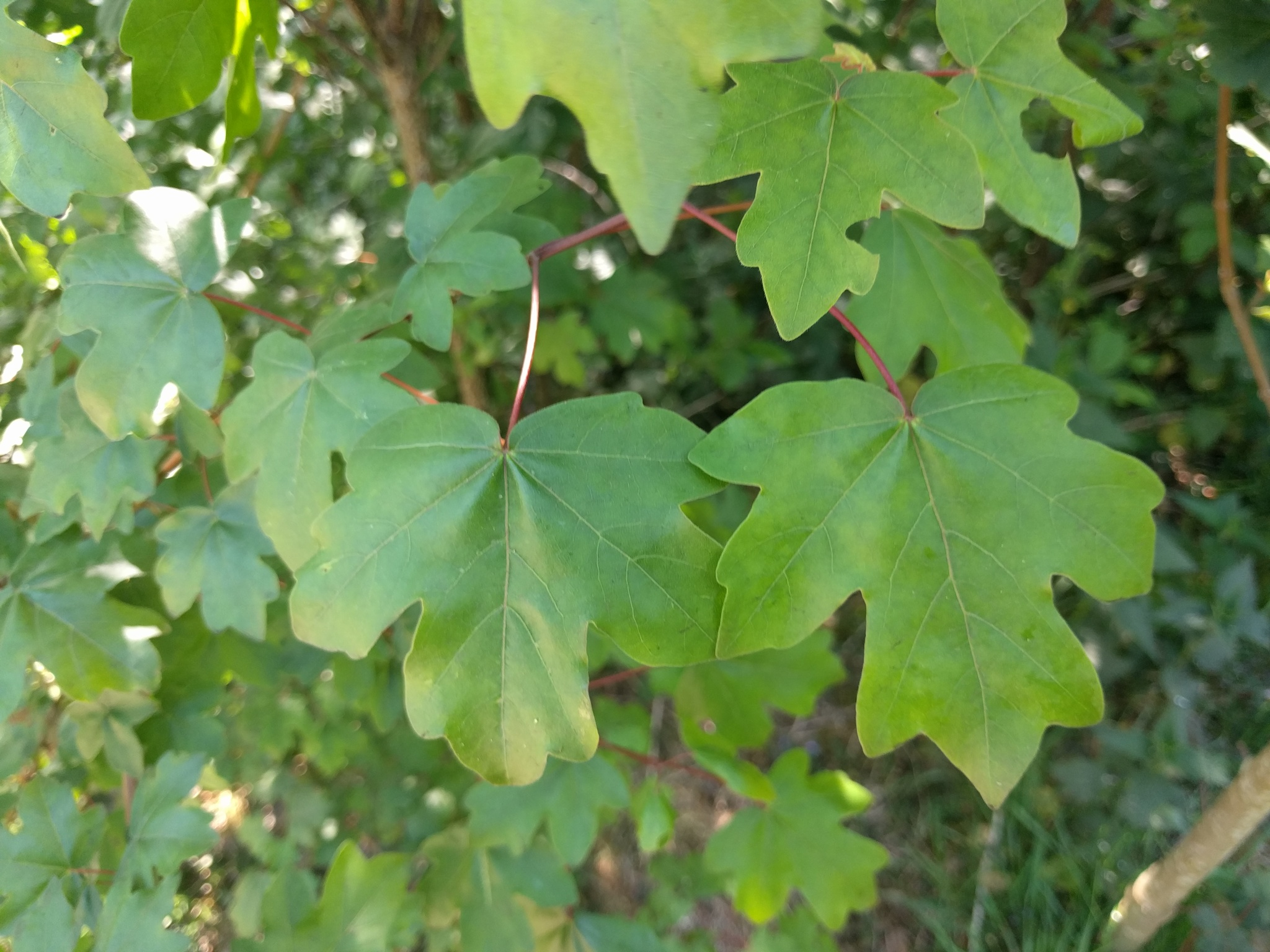
Acer campestre

===== Aceraceae =====
- Acer campestre (Field Maple)
- Acer monspessulanum (Montpellier Maple)
- Acer tataricum (Tatar Maple)

===== Rhamnaceae =====
- Paliurus spina-christi (Christ's Thorn)

===== Tiliaceae =====
- Tilia sp. (Linden Tree)

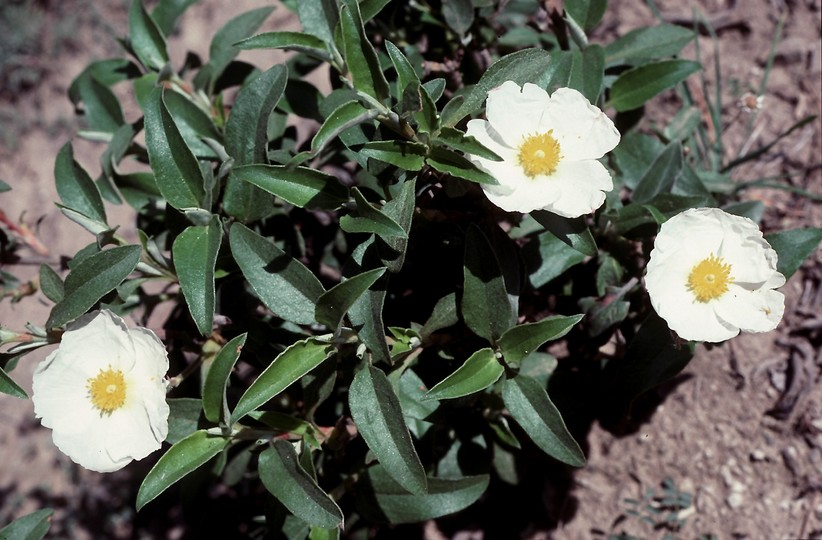
Cistus laurifolius

===== Cistaceae =====
- Cistus laurifolius (Laurel-leaved Rockrose)

===== Cornaceae =====
- Cornus mas (Cornelian Cherry)

===== Oleaceae =====
- Fraxinus ornus (Flowering Ash)
- Phillyrea media (Mock Privet)

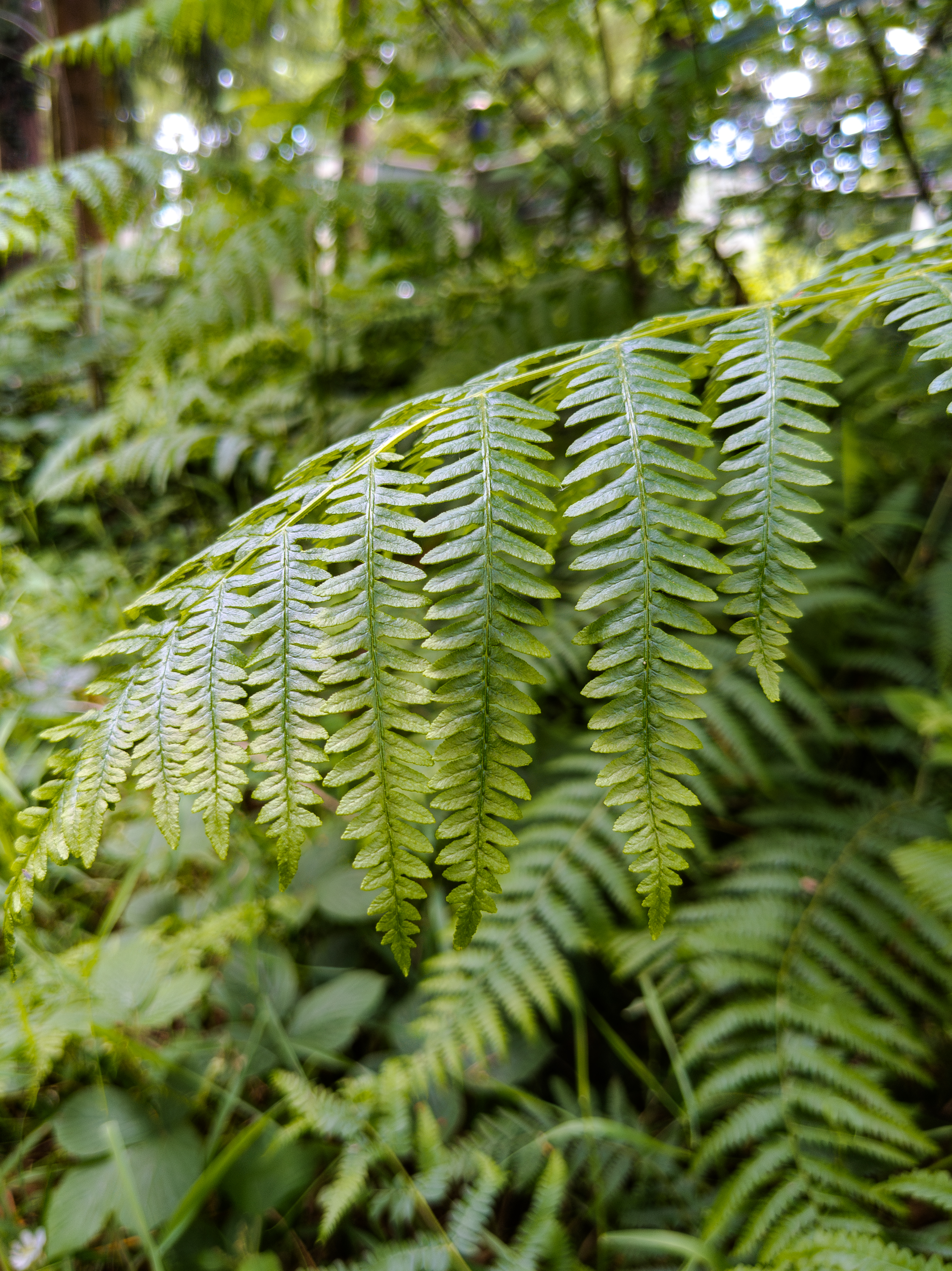
Pteridium aquilinum

===== Other Notable Species =====
- Onosma rigidum
- Pteridium aquilinum (Bracken Fern)
- Hedera helix (Ivy)

==== Fauna ====
The habitats in the Metaxades area are not particularly significant. The forested areas mainly consist of young oak forests growing on flat terrain. The Erythropotamos River, in its current form, resembles a large canal with minimal riparian vegetation. Interesting habitats are created only in locations where forested areas mix with small mountain crops.

===== Arthropods =====
====== Saltatoria ======
- Leptophyes albovittata
- Poecilimon miramae
- Platycleis (Insertana) inserta
- Metrioptera (Roeseliana) fedtschenkoi ambitiosa
- Pholidoptera fallax

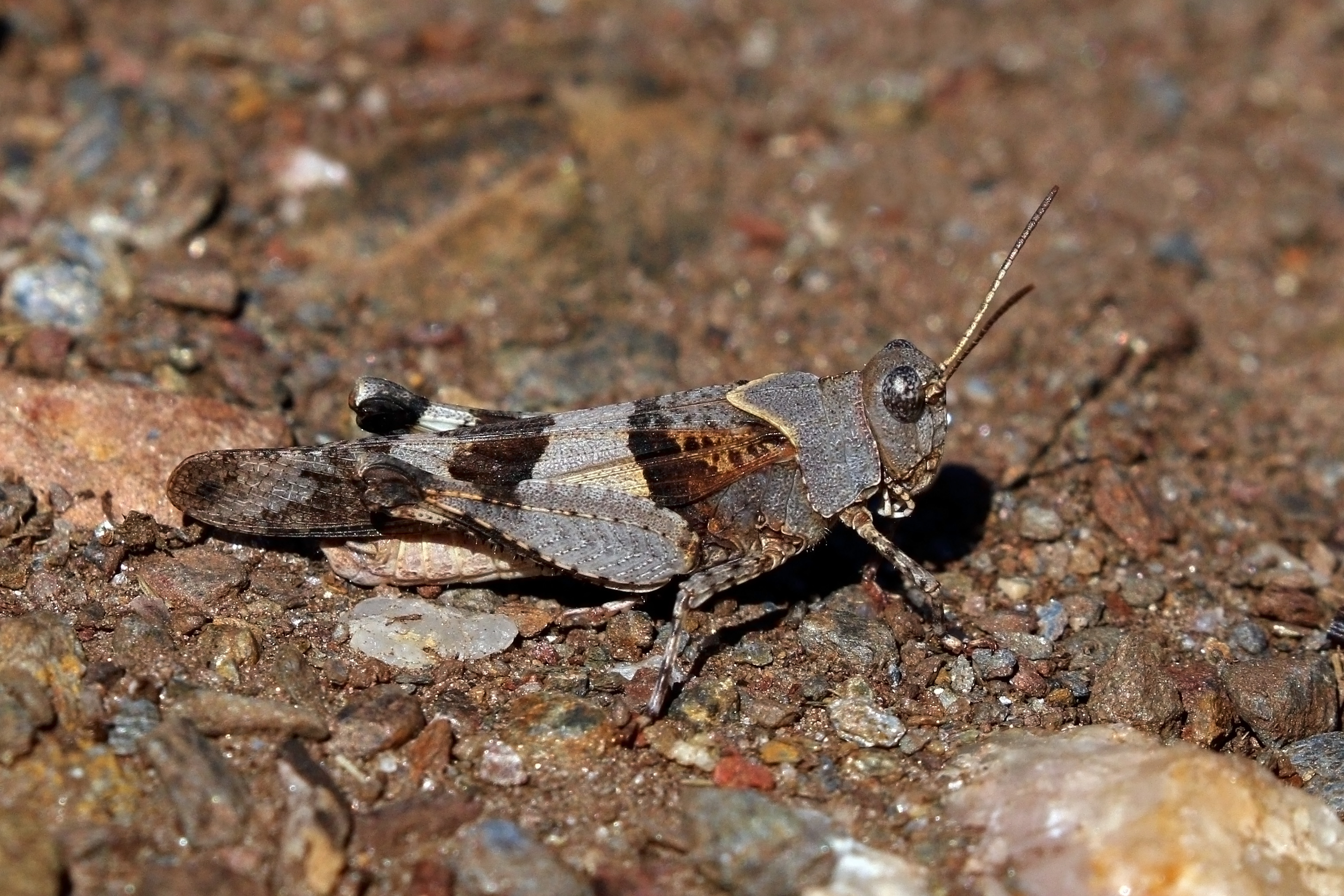
Oedipoda caerulescens

====== Acrididae ======
- Oedipoda caerulescens

====== Lepidoptera ======
- Pieris napi
- Pieris krueperi
- Vanessa cardui
- Melitaea didyma
- Maniola jurtina
- Epinephele tithonus
- Coenonympha pamphilus
- Pararge aegeria
- Lasiommata megera

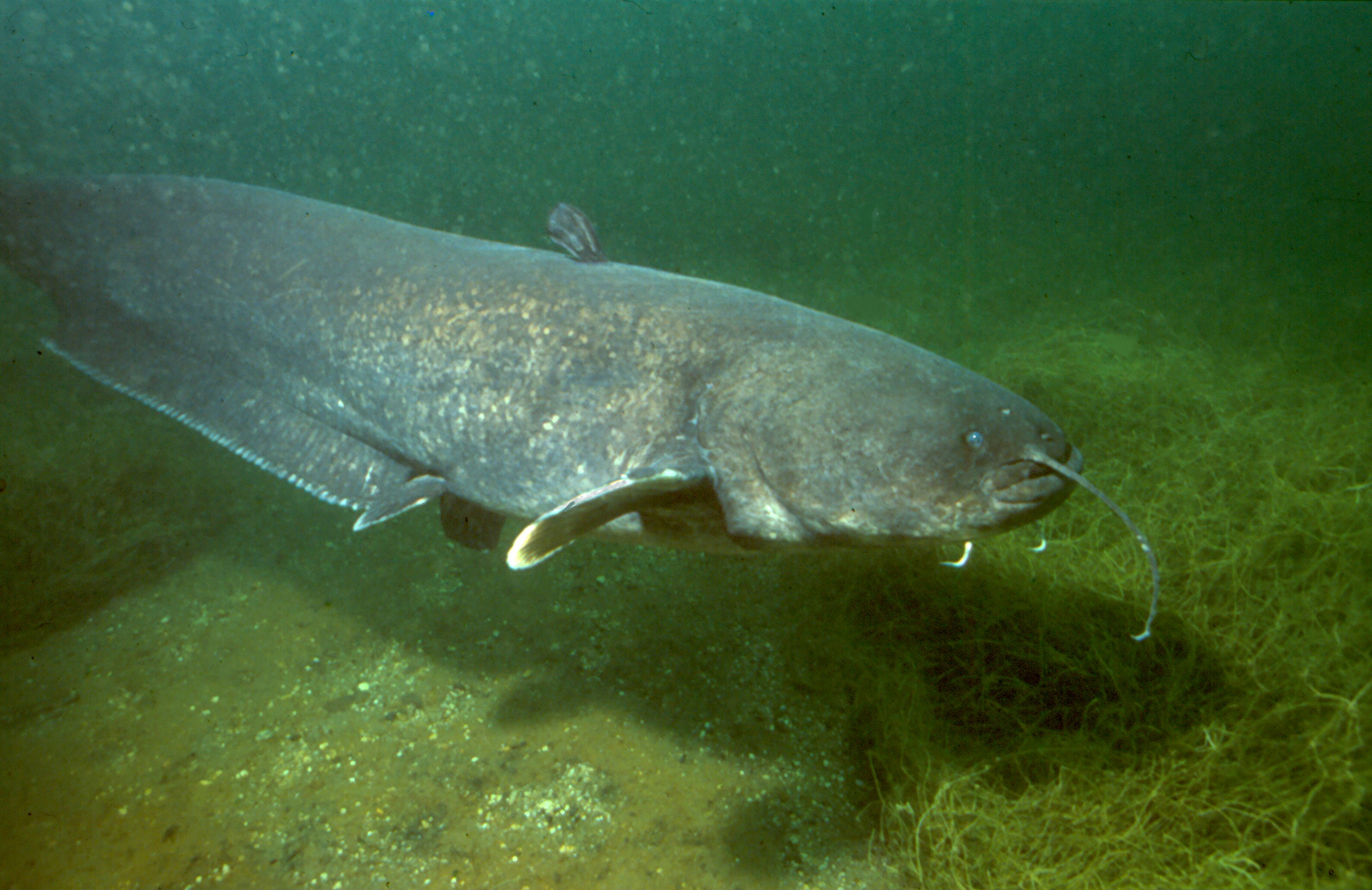
Silurus glanis

===== Fish =====
The fish species in the Erythropotamos River and its tributaries exhibit limited diversity due to summer drying.

- Leuciscus cephalus macedonicus (Macedonian Chub)
- Gobio gobio (Gudgeon)
- Barbus cyclolepis (Barbel)
- Rhodeus sericeus amarus (Bitterling)
- Cyprinus carpio (Common Carp)
- Cobitis stroumicae (Stroumbi Loach)
- Silurus glanis (Wels Catfish)
- Anguilla anguilla (European Eel)

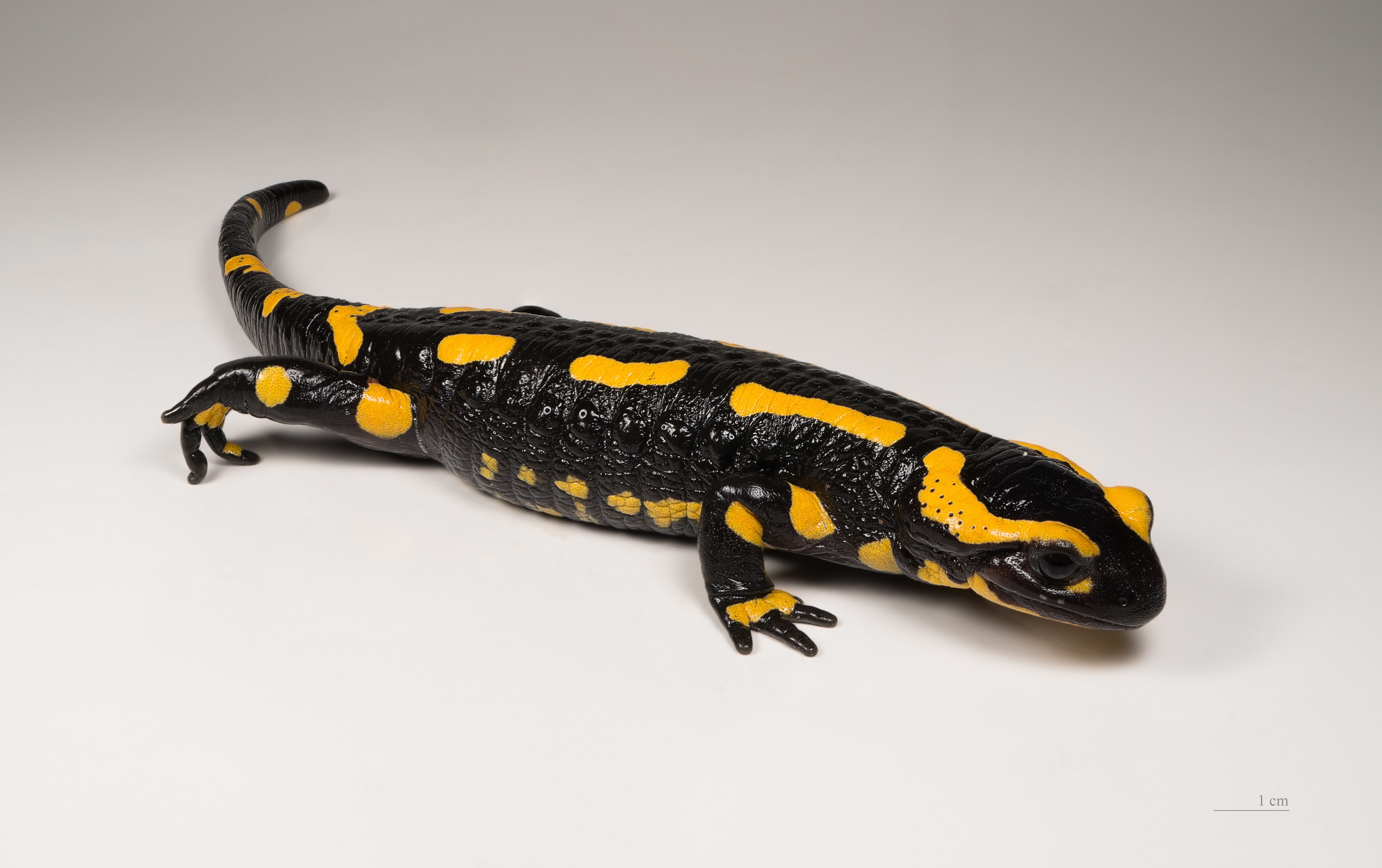
Salamandra salamandra

===== Amphibians =====
- Salamandra salamandra (Fire Salamander)
- Triturus vulgaris (Smooth Newt)
- Bombina variegata (Yellow-bellied Toad)
- Bufo bufo (Common Toad)
- Bufo viridis (Green Toad)
- Hyla arborea (European Tree Frog)
- Pelobates syriacus (Syrian Spadefoot)
- Rana ridibunda (Marsh Frog)

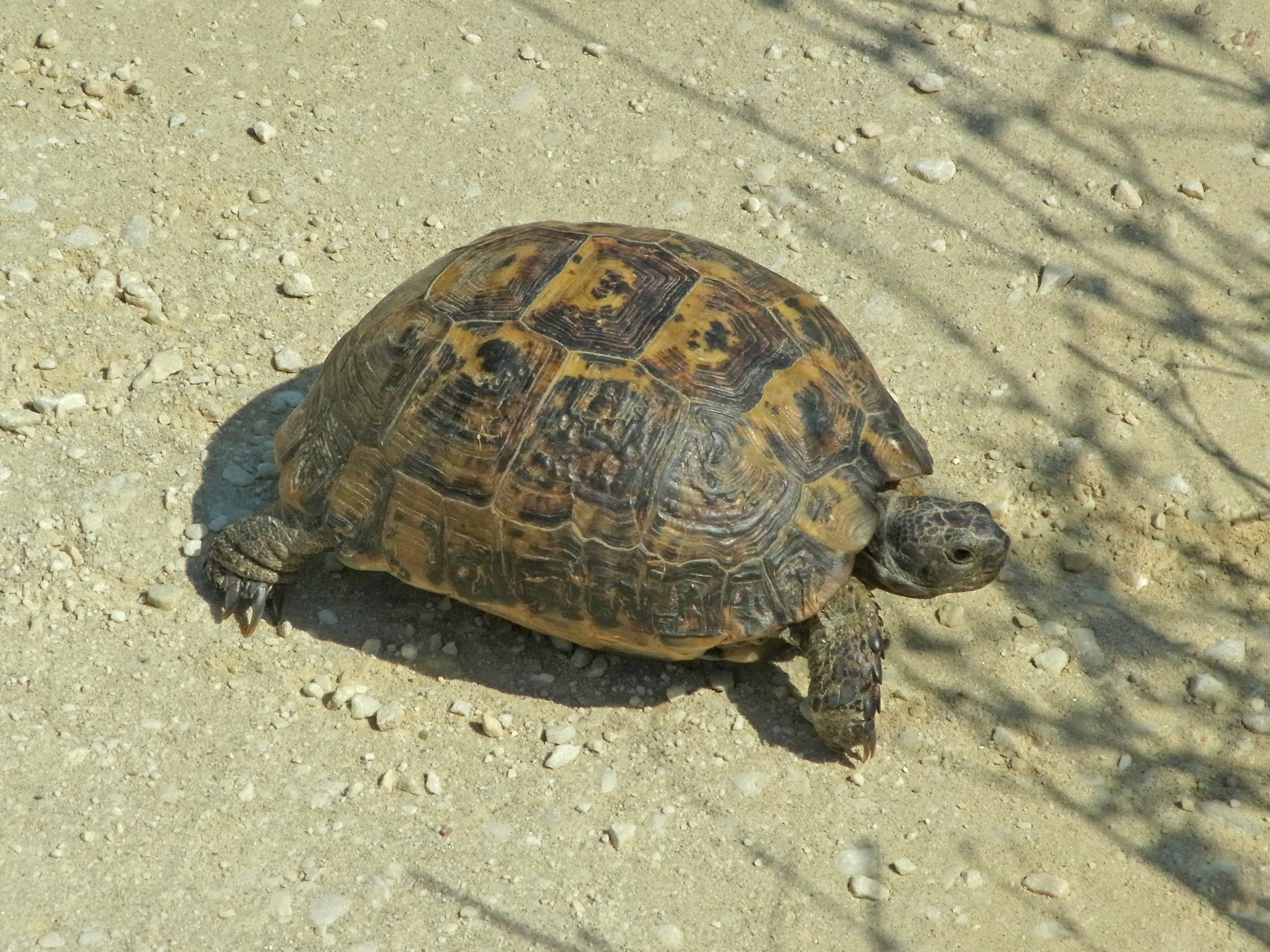
Testudo graeca

===== Reptiles =====
The Metaxades area presents a high diversity of reptiles due to its varied habitats, including forested hills, plains, and riparian ecosystems.

====== Tortoises ======
- Testudo hermanni (Hermann's tortoise)
- Testudo graeca (Greek tortoise)

====== Turtles ======
- Mauremys caspica (Caspian)
- Emys orbicularis (European Pond)

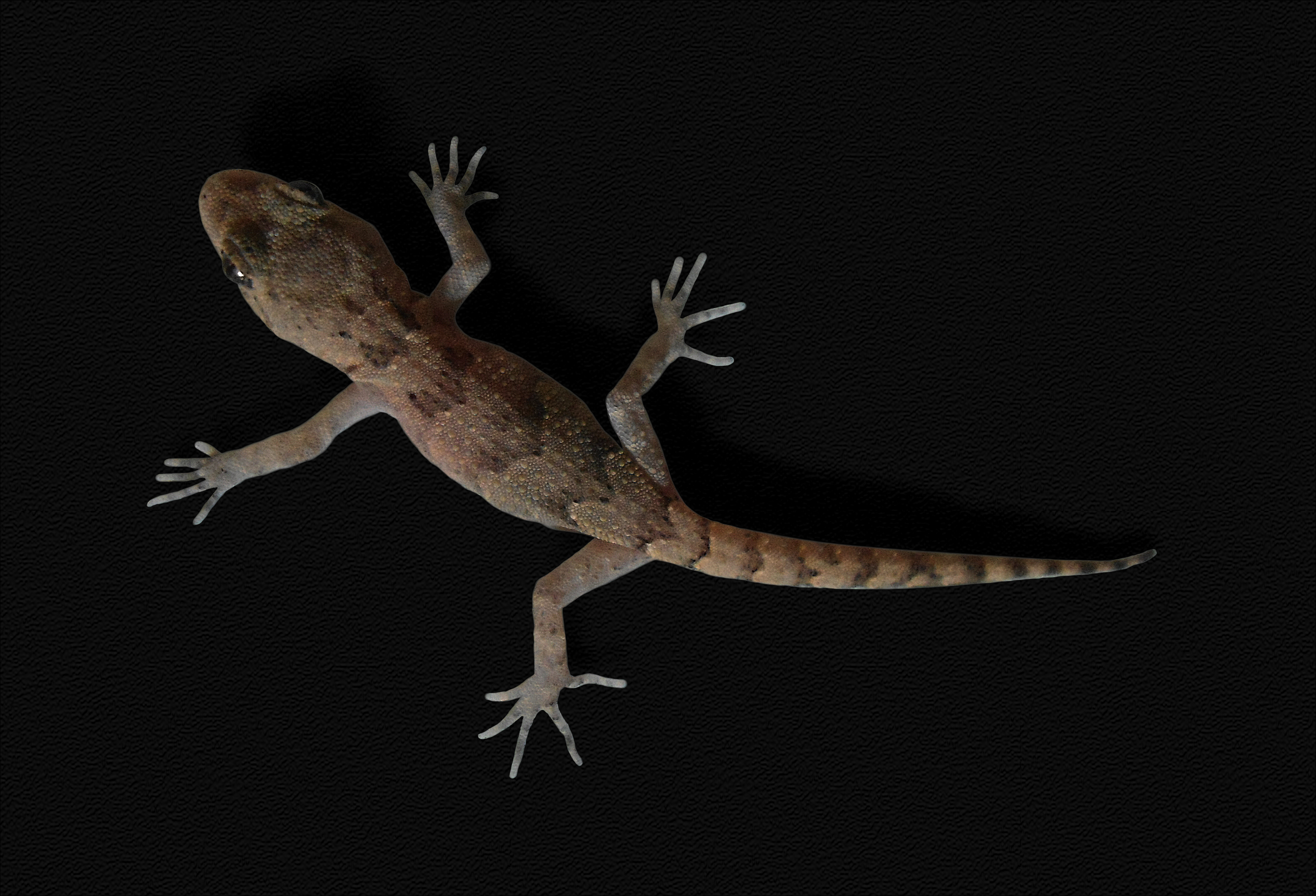
Cyrtopodion kotschyi

====== Lizards ======
- Podarcis erhardii (Erhard's Wall)
- Podarcis taurica (Balkan Wall)
- Podarcis muralis (Common Wall)
- Lacerta viridis (Green)
- Lacerta trilineata (Balkan Green)
- Anguis fragilis (Slowworm)
- Ophisaurus apodus (European Legless)
- Cyrtopodion kotschyi (Kotschy's Gecko)

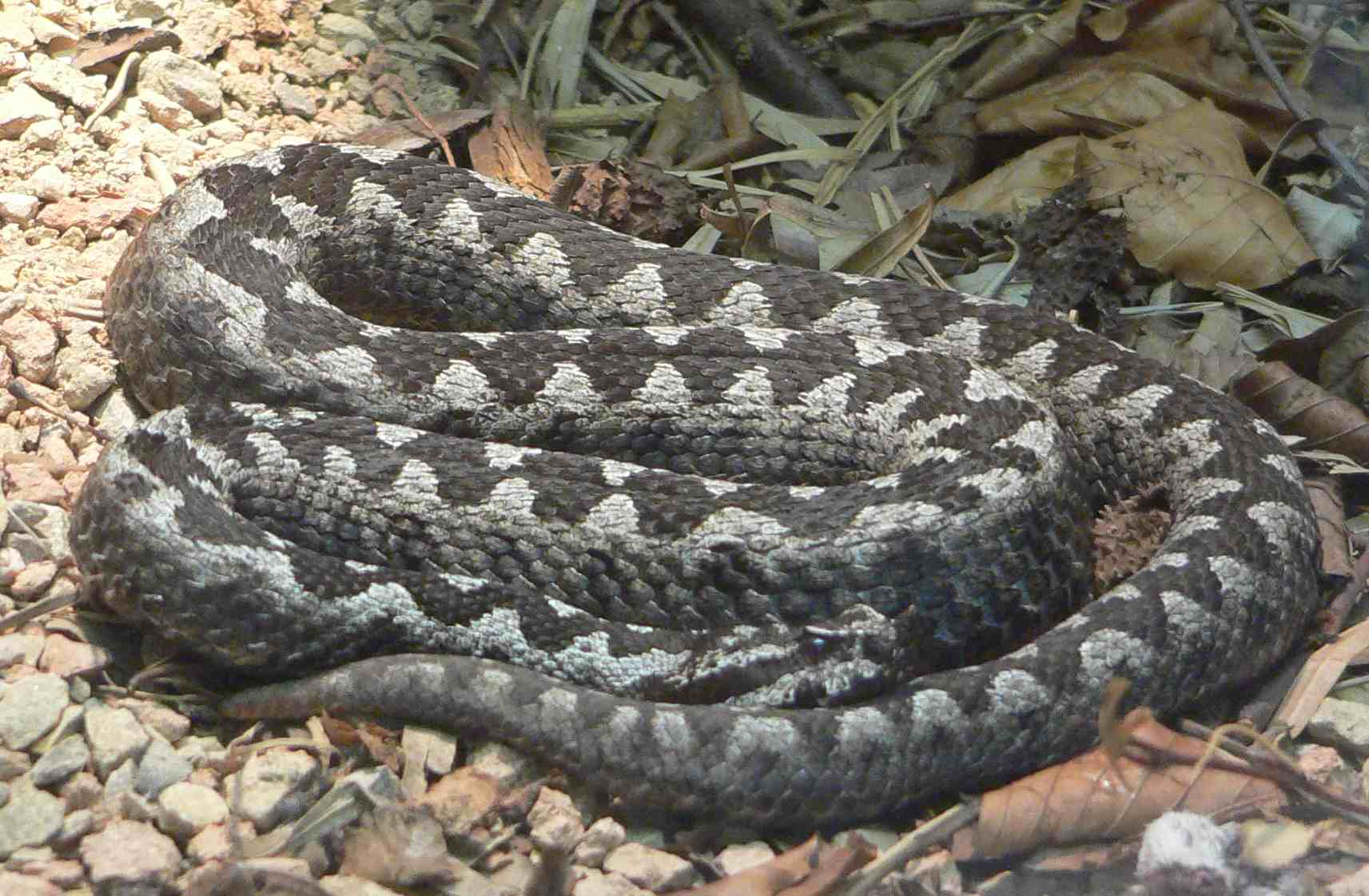
Vipera ammodytes, a poisonous snake in the Metaxades area

====== Snakes ======
- Malpolon monspessulanus (Montpellier)
- Coluber jugularis (Large Whip)
- Natrix natrix (Grass snake)
- Natrix tessellata (Dice)
- Vipera ammodytes (Nose-horned Viper)

===== Avifauna (Birds) =====
A very diverse bird population inhabits the region, with species from the following families:

====== Podicipedidae ======
- Tachybaptus ruficollis (Little Grebe)

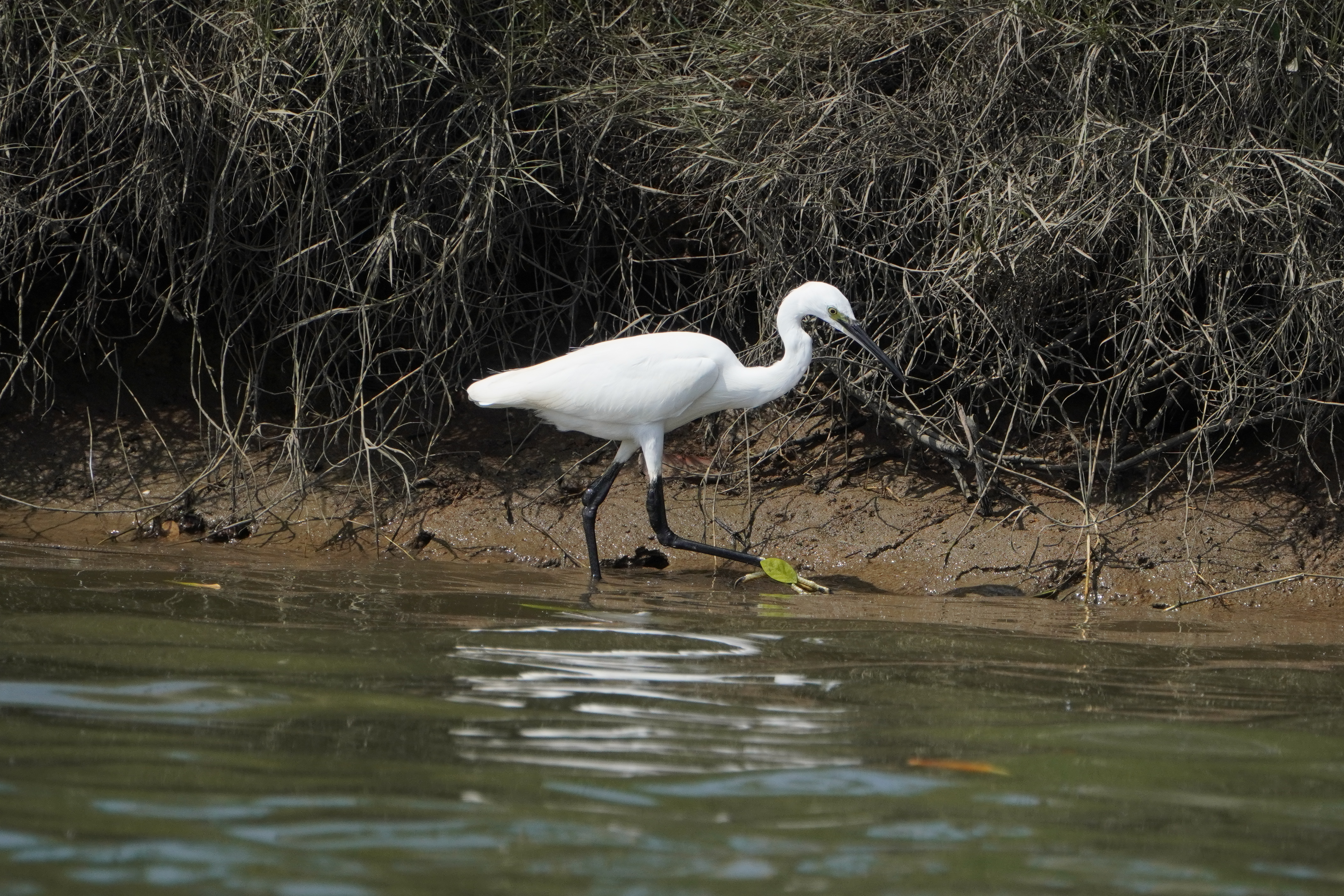
Egretta garzetta

====== Ardeidae ======
- Ixobrychus minutus (Little Bittern)
- Nycticorax nycticorax (Black-crowned Night Heron)
- Egretta garzetta (Little Egret)
- Ardea cinerea (Grey Heron)

====== Ciconiidae ======
- Ciconia nigra (Black Stork)
- Ciconia ciconia (White Stork)

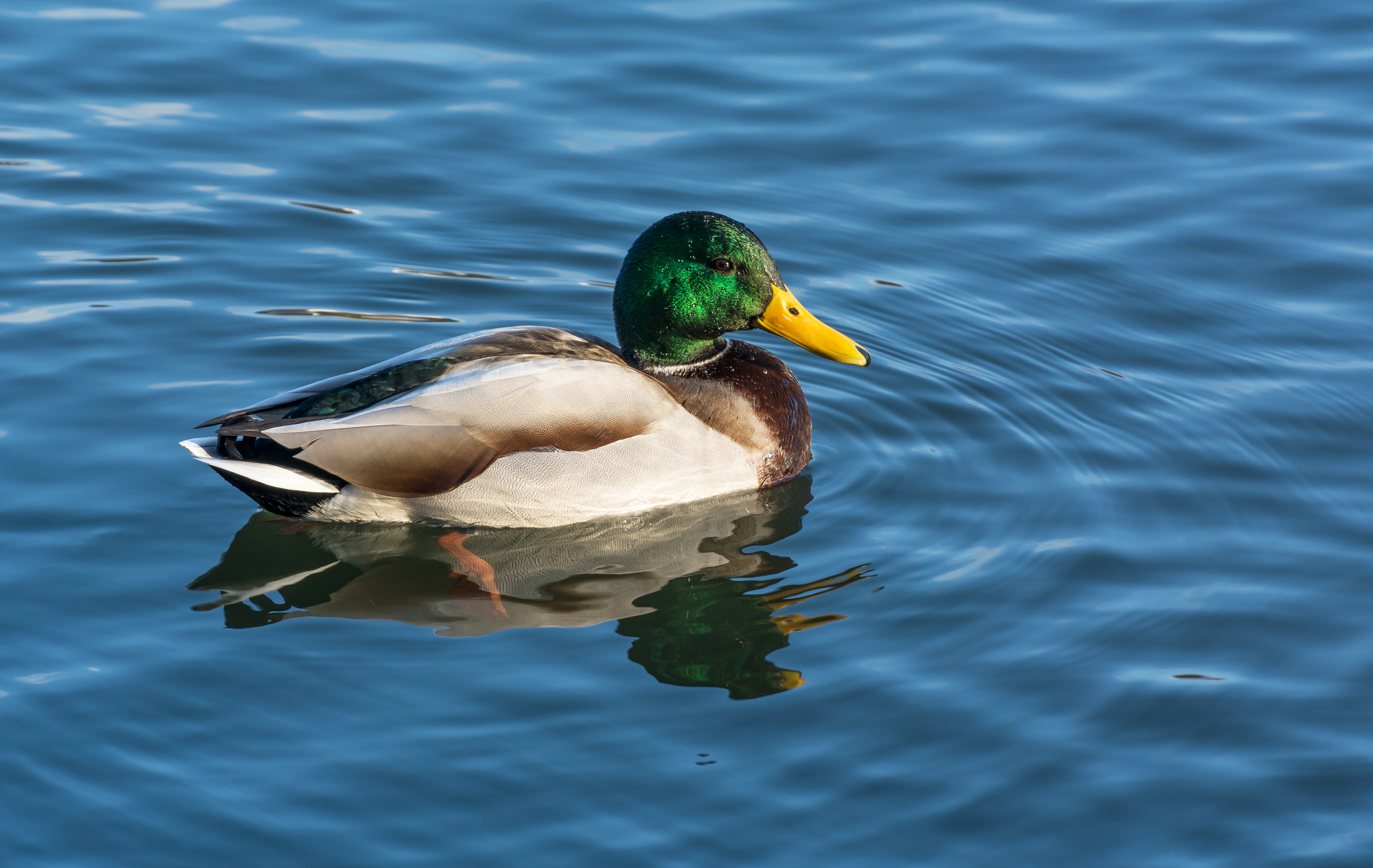
Anas platyrhynchos

====== Anatidae ======
- Anas platyrhynchos (Mallard)

====== Accipitridae ======
- Pernis apivorus (European Honey Buzzard)
- Milvus migrans (Black Kite)
- Neophron percnopterus (Egyptian Vulture)
- Gyps fulvus (Griffon Vulture)
- Aegypius monachus (Cinereous Vulture)
- Circaetus gallicus (Short-toed Snake Eagle)
- Circus aeruginosus (Western Marsh Harrier)
- Circus cyaneus (Hen Harrier)
- Accipiter gentilis (Northern Goshawk)
- Accipiter nisus (Eurasian Sparrowhawk)
- Accipiter brevipes (Levant Sparrowhawk)
- Buteo buteo (Common Buzzard)
- Aquila pomarina (Lesser Spotted Eagle)
- Aquila chrysaetos (Golden Eagle)
- Hieraaetus pennatus (Booted Eagle)

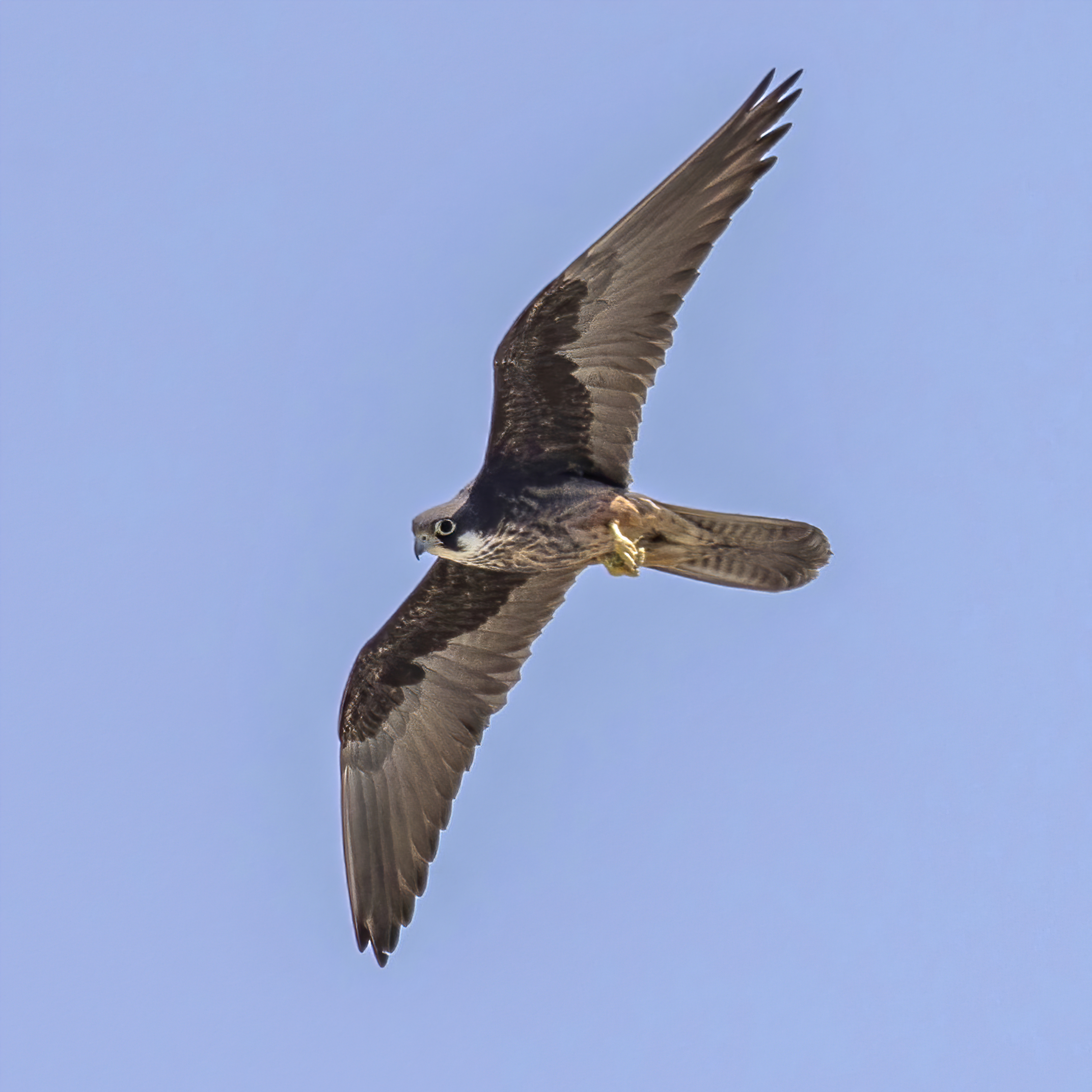
Falco eleonorae

====== Falconidae ======
- Falco tinnunculus (Common Kestrel)
- Falco subbuteo (Eurasian Hobby)
- Falco eleonorae (Eleonora's Falcon)
- Falco peregrinus (Peregrine Falcon)

====== Phasianidae ======
- Alectoris chukar (Chukar Partridge)
- Coturnix coturnix (Common Quail)

====== Rallidae ======
- Rallus aquaticus (Water Rail)
- Gallinula chloropus (Common Moorhen)

===== Other notable bird species =====
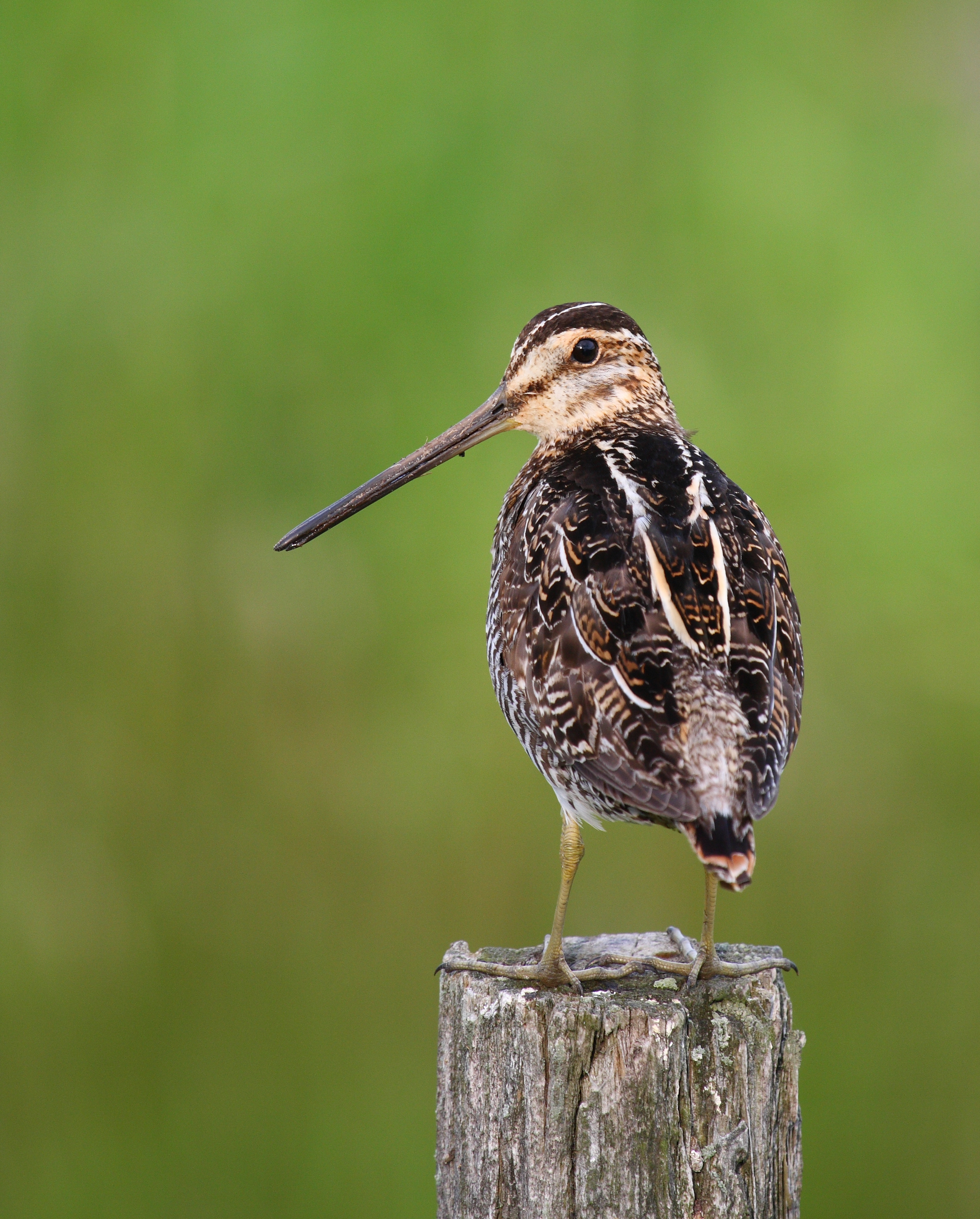
Gallinago gallinago

====== Waders and Shorebirds ======
- Charadrius dubius (Little Ringed Plover)
- Charadrius hiaticula (Common Ringed Plover)
- Vanellus vanellus (Northern Lapwing)
- Gallinago gallinago (Common Snipe)
- Scolopax rusticola (Eurasian Woodcock)

====== Gulls ======
- Larus ridibundus (Black-headed Gull)
- Larus cachinnans (Caspian Gull)

====== Pigeons and Doves ======
- Columba livia (Rock Dove)
- Columba palumbus (Common Wood Pigeon)
- Streptopelia decaocto (Eurasian Collared Dove)
- Streptopelia turtur (European Turtle Dove)

====== Cuckoos and Nightjars ======
- Cuculus canorus (Common Cuckoo)
- Caprimulgus europaeus (European Nightjar)

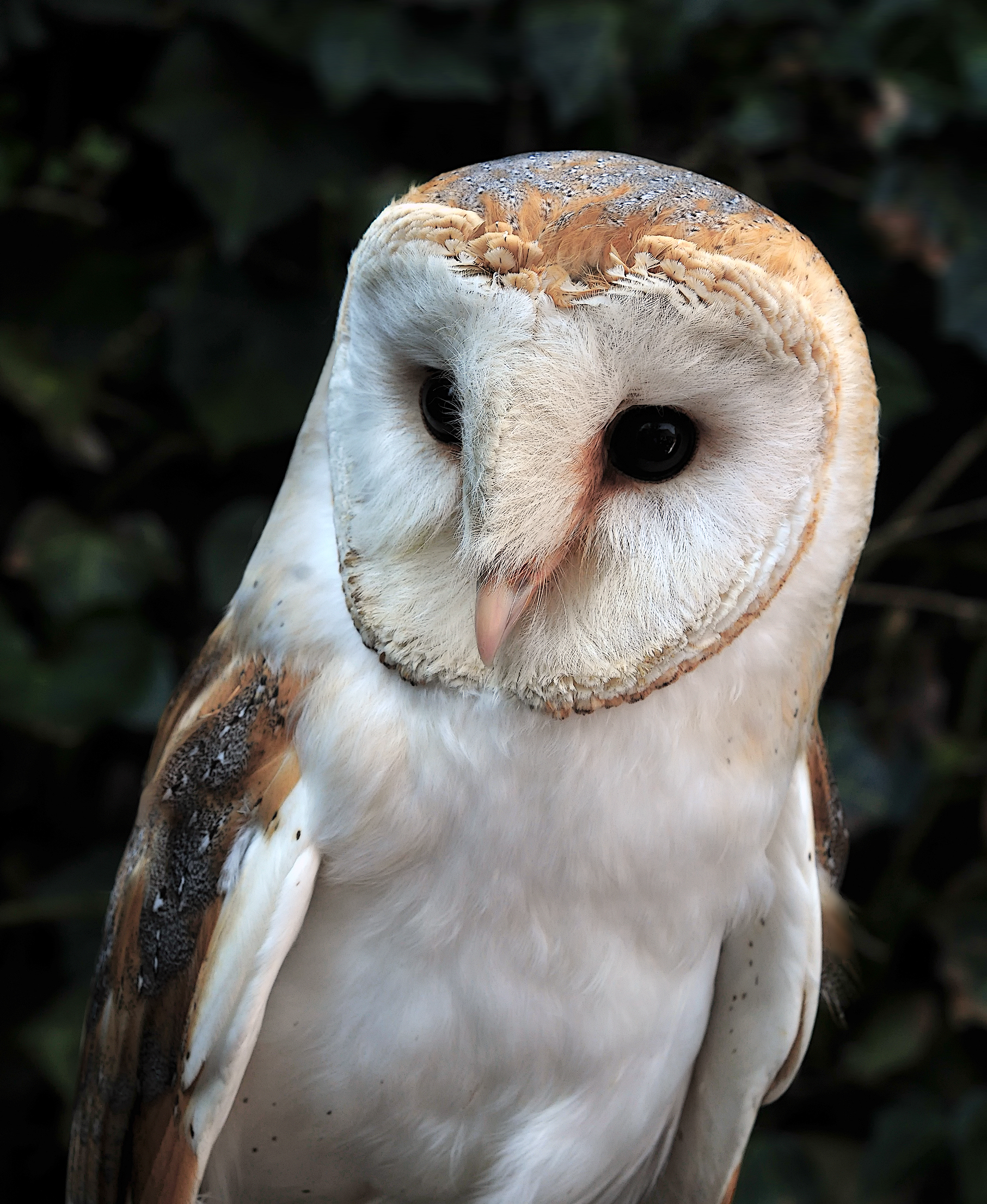
Tyto alba

====== Owls ======
- Tyto alba (Barn Owl)
- Otus scops (Eurasian Scops Owl)
- Bubo bubo (Eurasian Eagle-Owl)
- Athene noctua (Little Owl)
- Strix aluco (Tawny Owl)
- Asio otus (Long-eared Owl)

====== Swifts and Bee-eaters ======
- Apus apus (Common Swift)
- Apus pallidus (Pallid Swift)
- Apus melba (Alpine Swift)
- Merops apiaster (European Bee-eater)

====== Rollers and Kingfishers ======
- Coracias garrulus (European Roller)
- Alcedo atthis (Common Kingfisher)

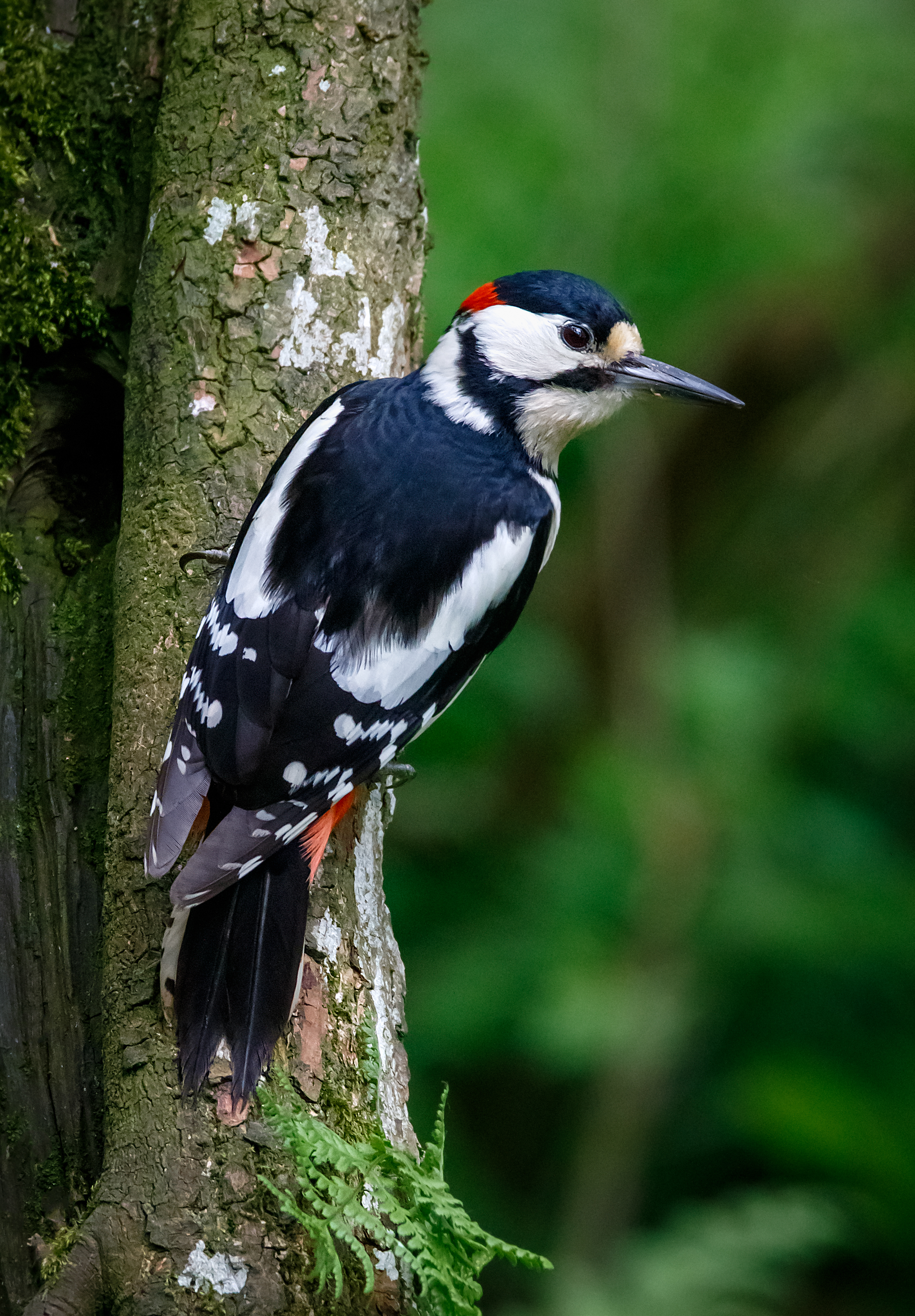
Dendrocopos major

====== Hoopoes and Woodpeckers ======
- Upupa epops (Eurasian Hoopoe)
- Picus canus (Grey-headed Woodpecker)
- Picus viridis (European Green Woodpecker)
- Dendrocopos major (Great Spotted Woodpecker)
- Dendrocopos syriacus (Syrian Woodpecker)

====== Larks ======
- Melanocorypha calandra (Calandra Lark)
- Calandrella brachydactyla (Greater Short-toed Lark)
- Galerida cristata (Crested Lark)
- Lullula arborea (Woodlark)
- Alauda arvensis (Eurasian Skylark)

====== Swallows and Martins ======
- Riparia riparia (Sand Martin)
- Hirundo rupestris (Eurasian Crag Martin)
- Hirundo rustica (Barn Swallow)
- Hirundo daurica (Red-rumped Swallow)
- Delichon urbicum (Common House Martin)

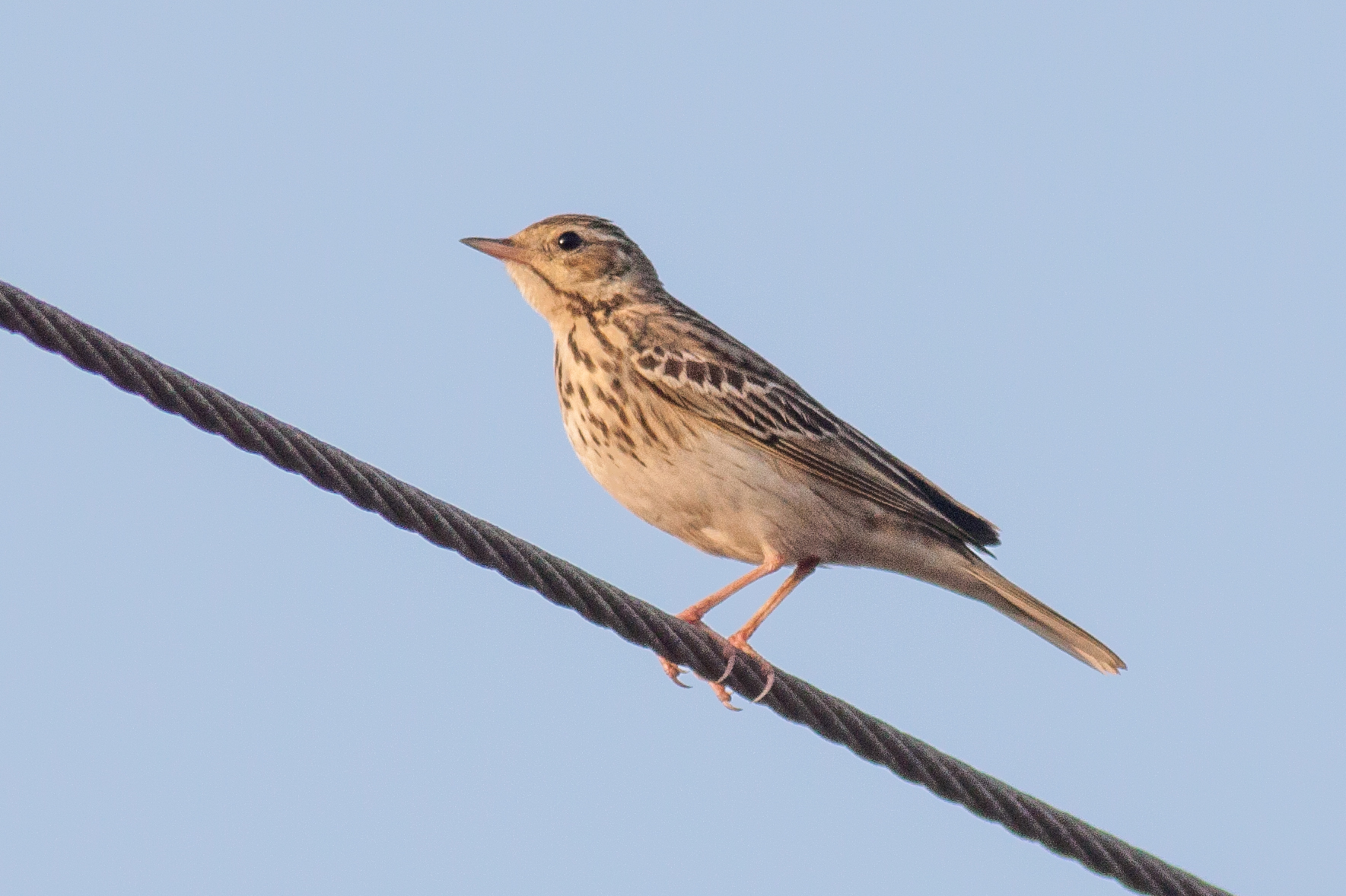
Anthus trivialis

====== Pipits ======
- Anthus campestris (Tawny Pipit)
- Anthus trivialis (Tree Pipit)
- Anthus pratensis (Meadow Pipit)

====== Wagtails and Wrens ======
- Motacilla flava (Western Yellow Wagtail)
- Motacilla cinerea (Grey Wagtail)
- Motacilla alba (White Wagtail)
- Troglodytes troglodytes (Eurasian Wren)

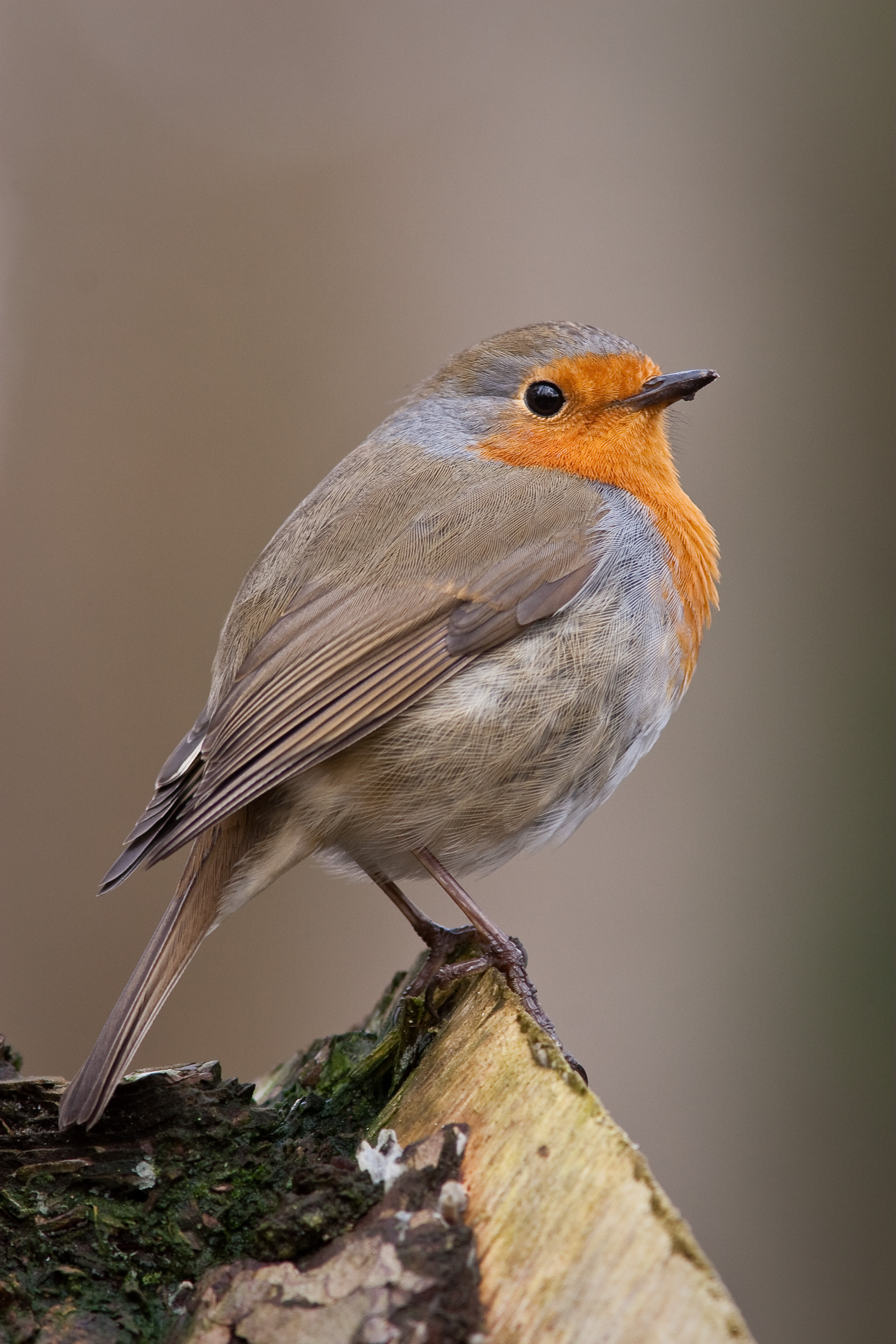
Erithacus rubecula

====== Accentors and Robins ======
- Prunella modularis (Dunnock)
- Erithacus rubecula (European Robin)

====== Nightingales and Redstarts ======
- Luscinia megarhynchos (Common Nightingale)
- Phoenicurus ochruros (Black Redstart)
- Phoenicurus phoenicurus (Common Redstart)

====== Chats and Wheatears ======
- Saxicola torquata (European/African Stonechat)
- Saxicola rubetra (Whinchat)
- Oenanthe isabellina (Isabelline Wheatear)
- Oenanthe oenanthe (Northern Wheatear)
- Oenanthe hispanica (Black-eared Wheatear)

====== Thrushes ======
- Turdus merula (Common Blackbird)
- Turdus pilaris (Fieldfare)
- Turdus philomelos (Song Thrush)
- Turdus iliacus (Redwing)
- Turdus viscivorus (Mistle Thrush)

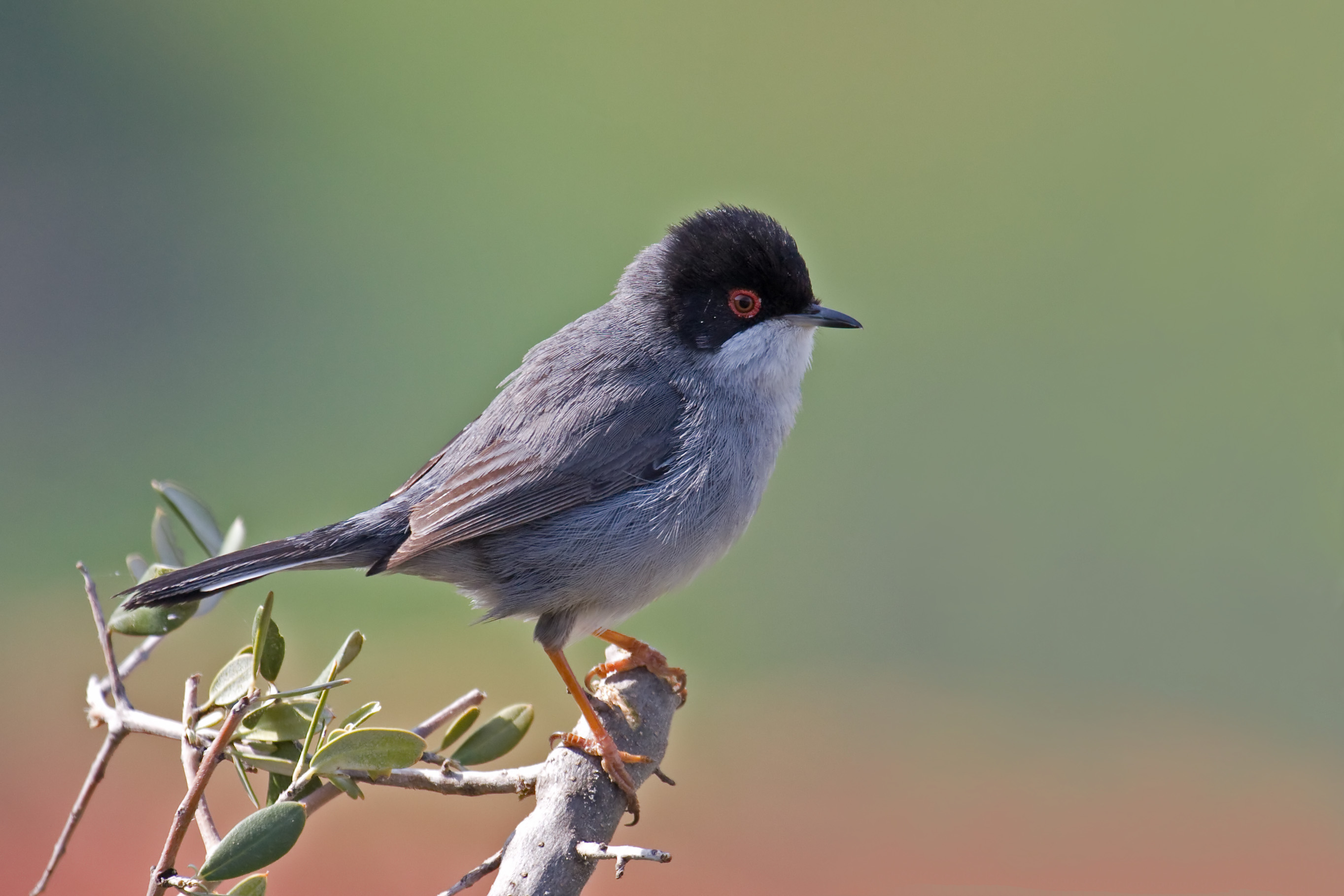
Sylvia melanocephala

====== Warblers (Various Families) ======
- Cettia cetti (Cetti's Warbler)
- Hippolais pallida (Eastern Olivaceous Warbler)
- Hippolais icterina (Icterine Warbler)
- Sylvia cantillans (Subalpine Warbler)
- Sylvia melanocephala (Sardinian Warbler)
- Sylvia hortensis (Orphean Warbler)
- Sylvia communis (Common Whitethroat)
- Sylvia borin (Garden Warbler)
- Sylvia atricapilla (Eurasian Blackcap)
- Phylloscopus bonelli (Western Bonelli's Warbler)
- Phylloscopus collybita (Common Chiffchaff)

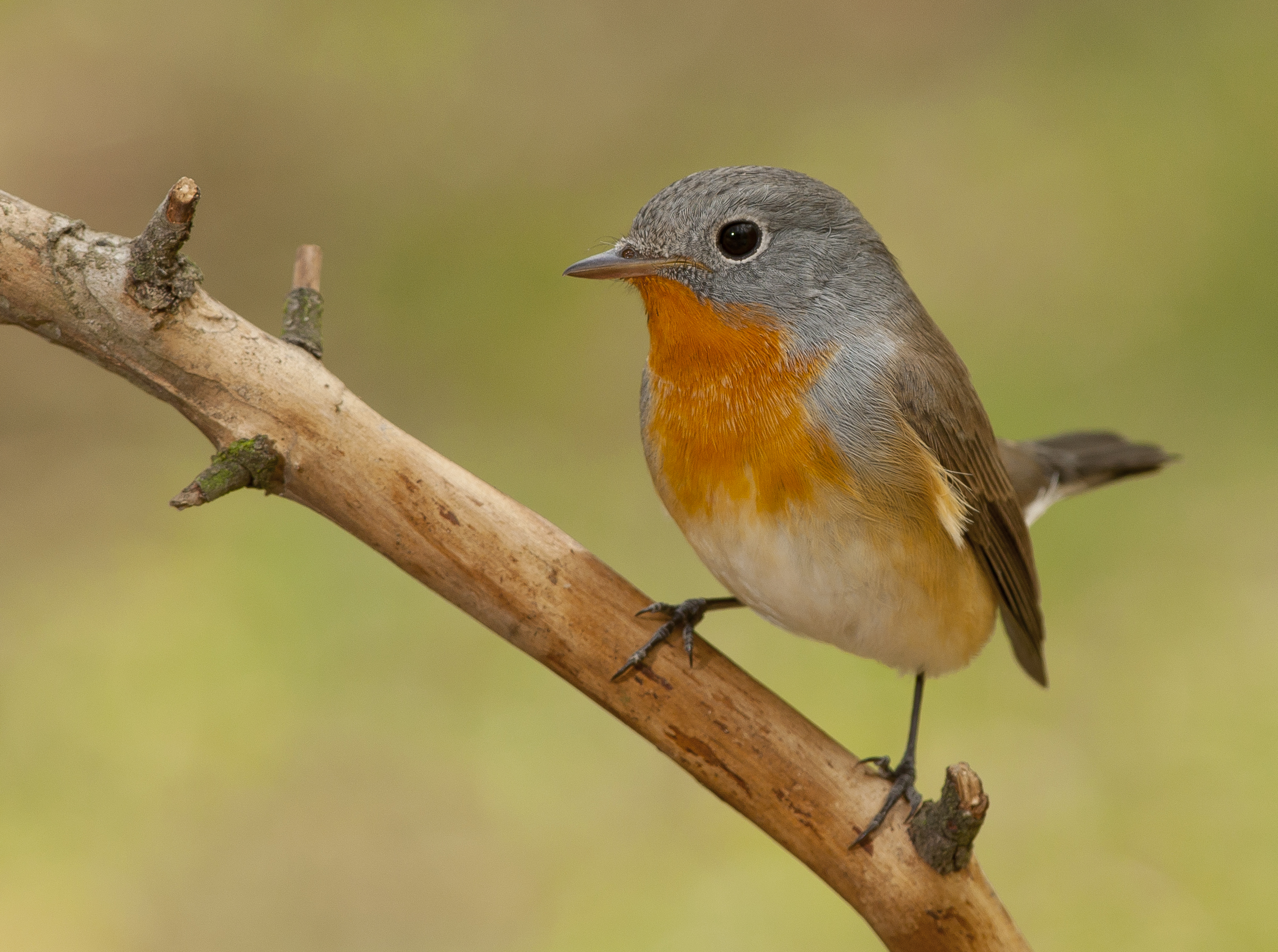
Ficedula parva

====== Flycatchers ======
- Muscicapa striata (Spotted Flycatcher)
- Ficedula parva (Red-breasted Flycatcher)
- Ficedula albicollis (Collared Flycatcher)
- Ficedula hypoleuca (European Pied Flycatcher)

====== Tits, Nuthatches, and Treecreepers ======
- Aegithalos caudatus (Long-tailed Tit)
- Parus lugubris (Sombre Tit)
- Parus ater (Coal Tit)
- Parus caeruleus (Eurasian Blue Tit)
- Parus major (Great Tit)
- Sitta europaea (Eurasian Nuthatch)
- Certhia familiaris (Eurasian Treecreeper)

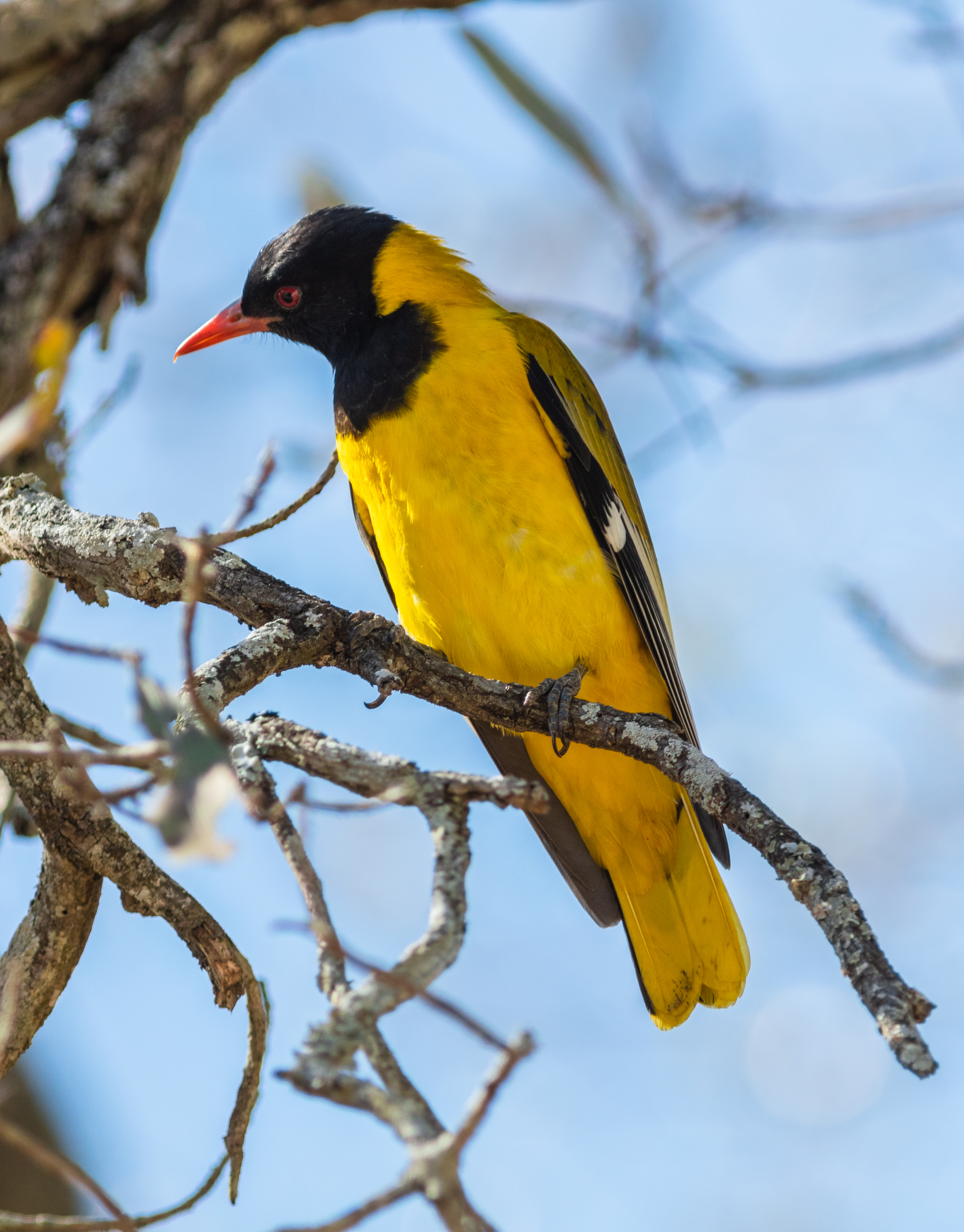
Oriolus oriolus

====== Orioles and Shrikes ======
- Oriolus oriolus (Eurasian Golden Oriole)
- Lanius collurio (Red-backed Shrike)
- Lanius minor (Lesser Grey Shrike)
- Lanius senator (Woodchat Shrike)

====== Crows, Jays, and Magpies (Corvids) ======
- Garrulus glandarius (Eurasian Jay)
- Pica pica (Eurasian Magpie)
- Corvus monedula (Western Jackdaw)
- Corvus frugilegus (Rook)
- Corvus corone (Carrion Crow)
- Corvus corax (Common Raven)

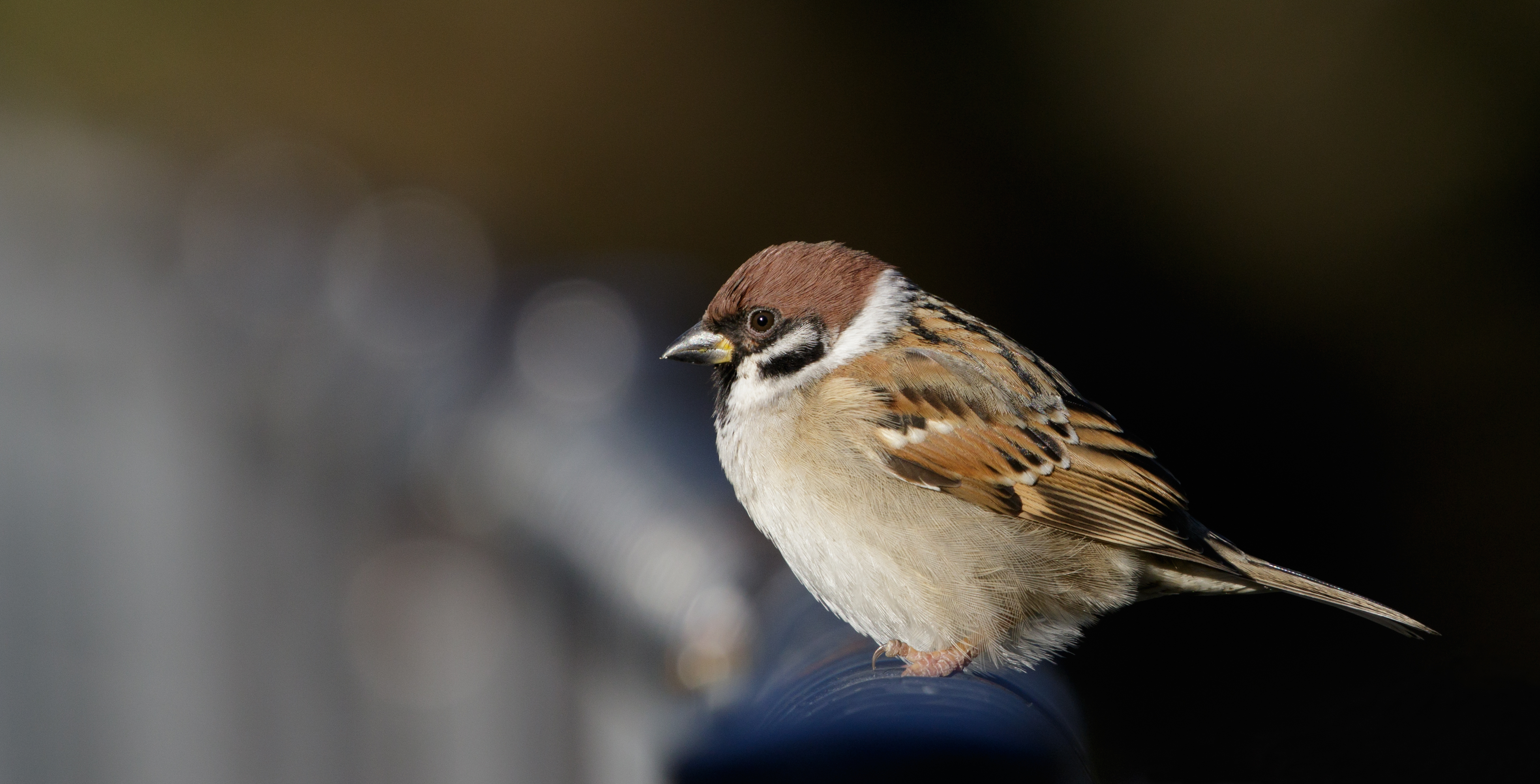
Passer montanus

====== Starlings and Sparrows ======
- Sturnus vulgaris (European Starling)
- Passer domesticus (House Sparrow)
- Passer hispaniolensis (Spanish Sparrow)
- Passer montanus (Eurasian Tree Sparrow)

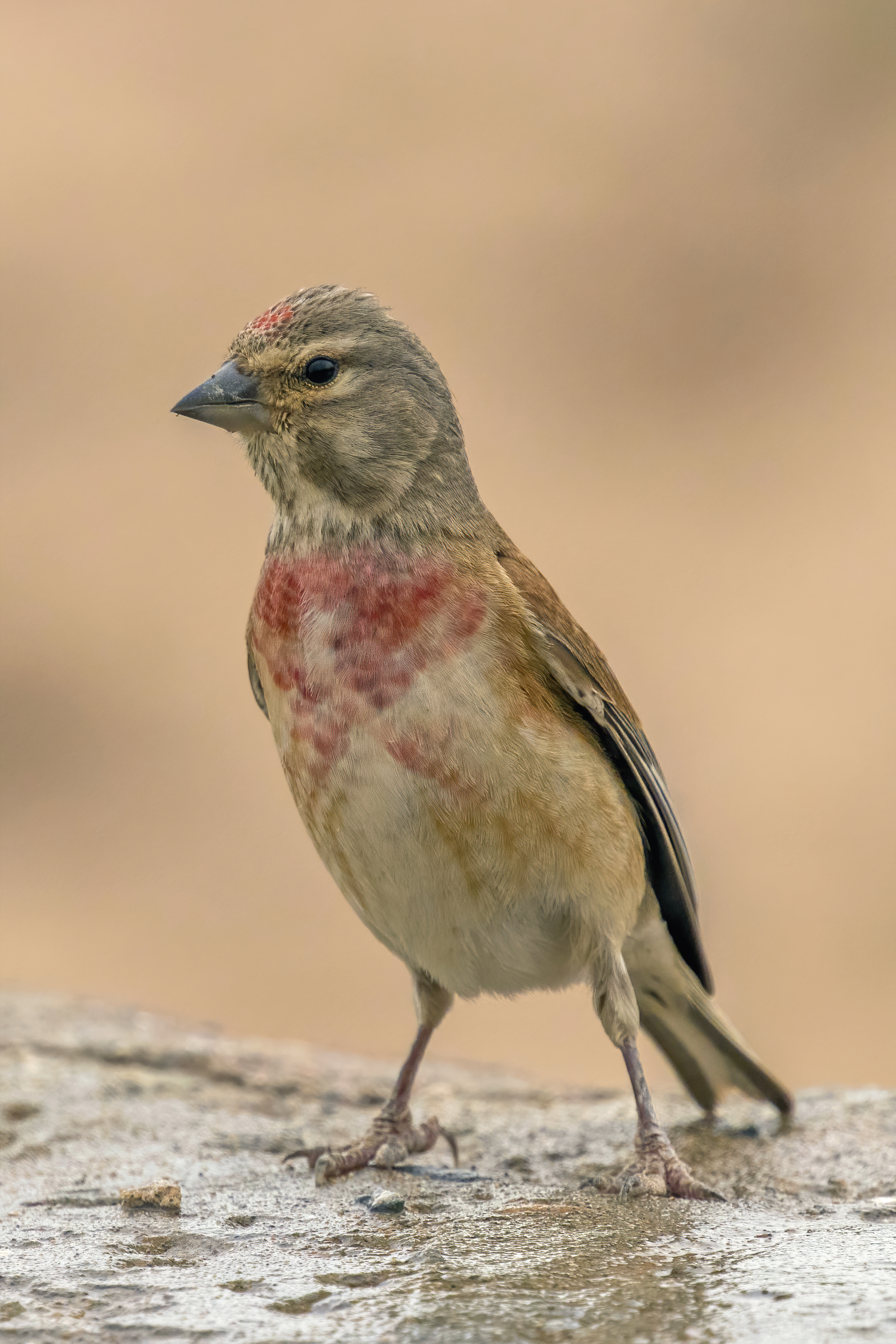
Carduelis cannabina

====== Finches and Allies ======
- Fringilla coelebs (Common Chaffinch)
- Fringilla montifringilla (Brambling)
- Serinus serinus (European Serin)
- Carduelis chloris (European Greenfinch)
- Carduelis carduelis (European Goldfinch)
- Carduelis spinus (Eurasian Siskin)
- Carduelis cannabina (Common Linnet)
- Coccothraustes coccothraustes (Hawfinch)

====== Buntings ======
- Emberiza citrinella (Yellowhammer)
- Emberiza cirlus (Cirl Bunting)
- Emberiza hortulana (Ortolan Bunting)
- Emberiza caesia (Cretzschmar's Bunting)
- Emberiza schoeniclus (Common Reed Bunting)
- Emberiza melanocephala (Black-headed Bunting)
- Miliaria calandra (Corn Bunting)

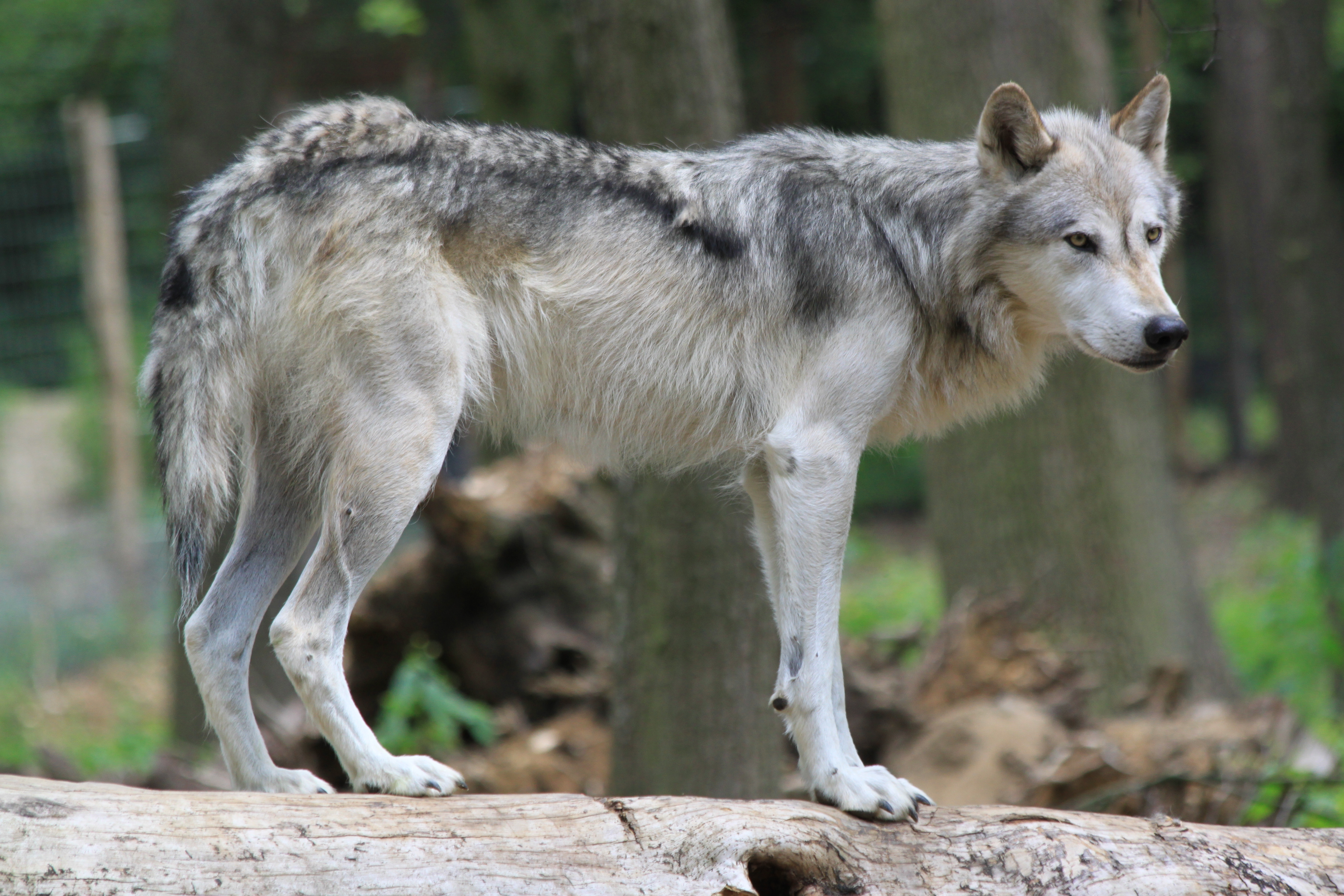
Canis lupus

===== Mammals =====
The mammals in the general area of Metaxades include:

====== Leporidae ======
- Lepus europaeus (European Hare)

====== Canidae ======
- Canis lupus (Grey Wolf)
- Vulpes vulpes (Red Fox)

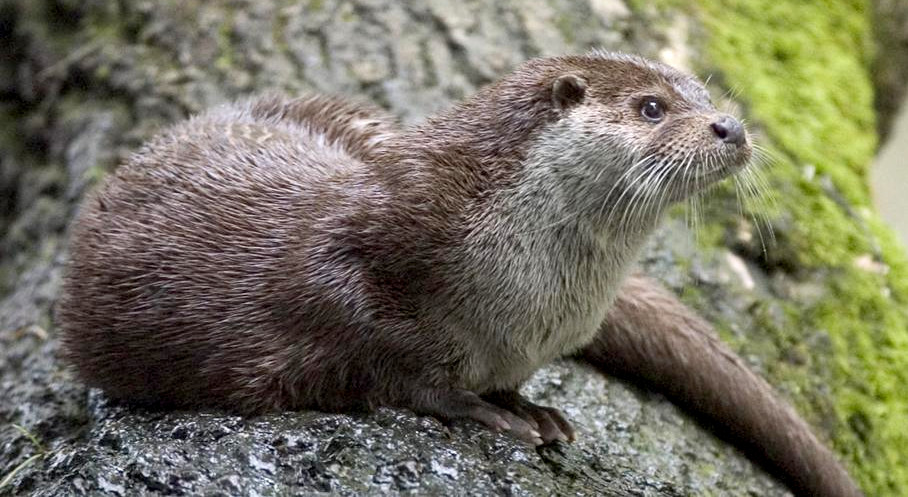
Lutra lutra

====== Mustelidae ======
- Mustela nivalis (Least Weasel)
- Martes foina (Beech Marten)
- Meles meles (European Badger)
- Lutra lutra (European Otter)

====== Erinaceidae ======
- Erinaceus concolor (Southern White-breasted Hedgehog)

====== Soricidae ======
- Crocidura leucodon (Bicolored Shrew)
- Crocidura suaveolens (Lesser White-toothed Shrew)
- Neomys anomalus (Mediterranean Water Shrew)

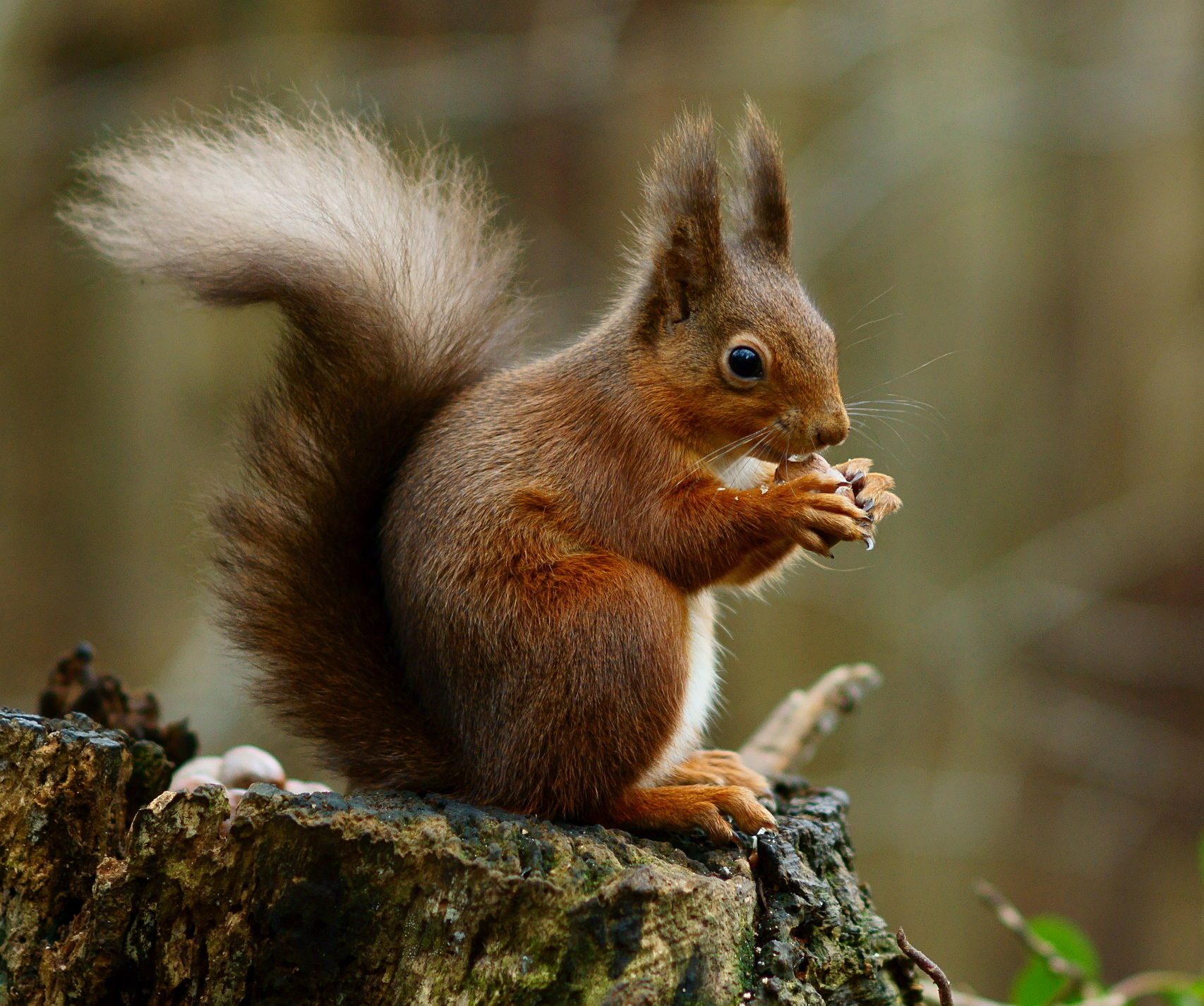
Sciurus vulgaris

====== Sciuridae ======
- Sciurus vulgaris (Red Squirrel)

====== Spalacidae ======
- Spalax leucodon (Lesser Blind Mole-Rat)

====== Gliridae ======
- Dryomys nitedula (Forest Dormouse)

====== Arvicolidae ======
- Microtus arvalis (Common Vole)
- Pitymus subterraneus (European Pine Vole)
- Microtus epiroticus (Epirotean Vole)

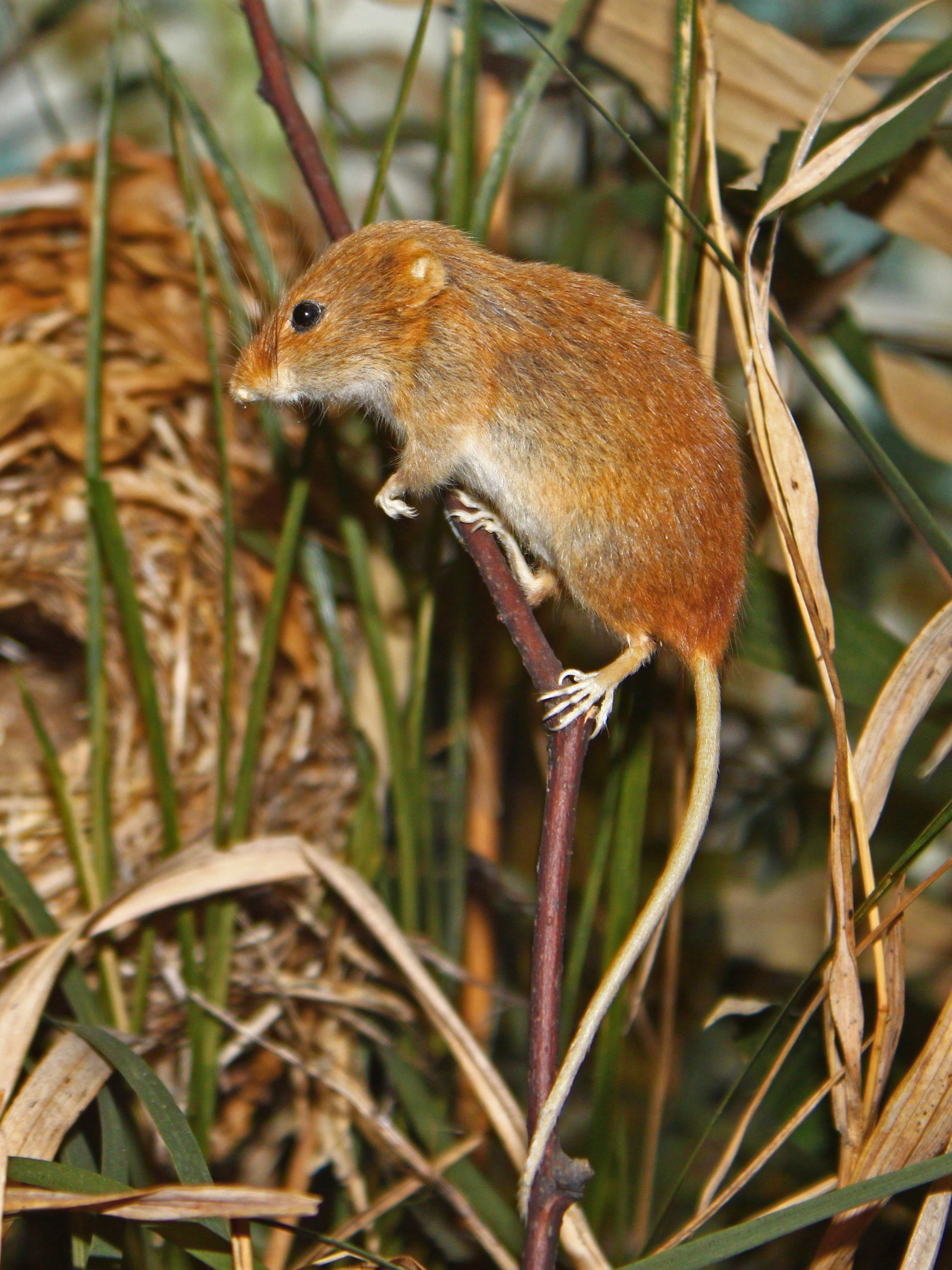
Micromys minutus

====== Muridae ======
- Micromys minutus (Eurasian Harvest Mouse)
- Apodemus sylvaticus (Wood Mouse)
- Apodemus flavicolis (Yellow-necked Mouse)
- Mus abbotti (Abbott's Mouse)
- Rattus norvegicus (Brown Rat)

==== Endemic and Threatened Species ====
===== Flora =====
- Onosma rigidum (rare in Greece, found only in Evros and Chios)
- Salix xanthicola (shrub, endemic to Thrace)

===== Fish =====
====== Locally vulnerable ======
- Leuciscus cephalus macedonicus
- Cobitis stroumicae

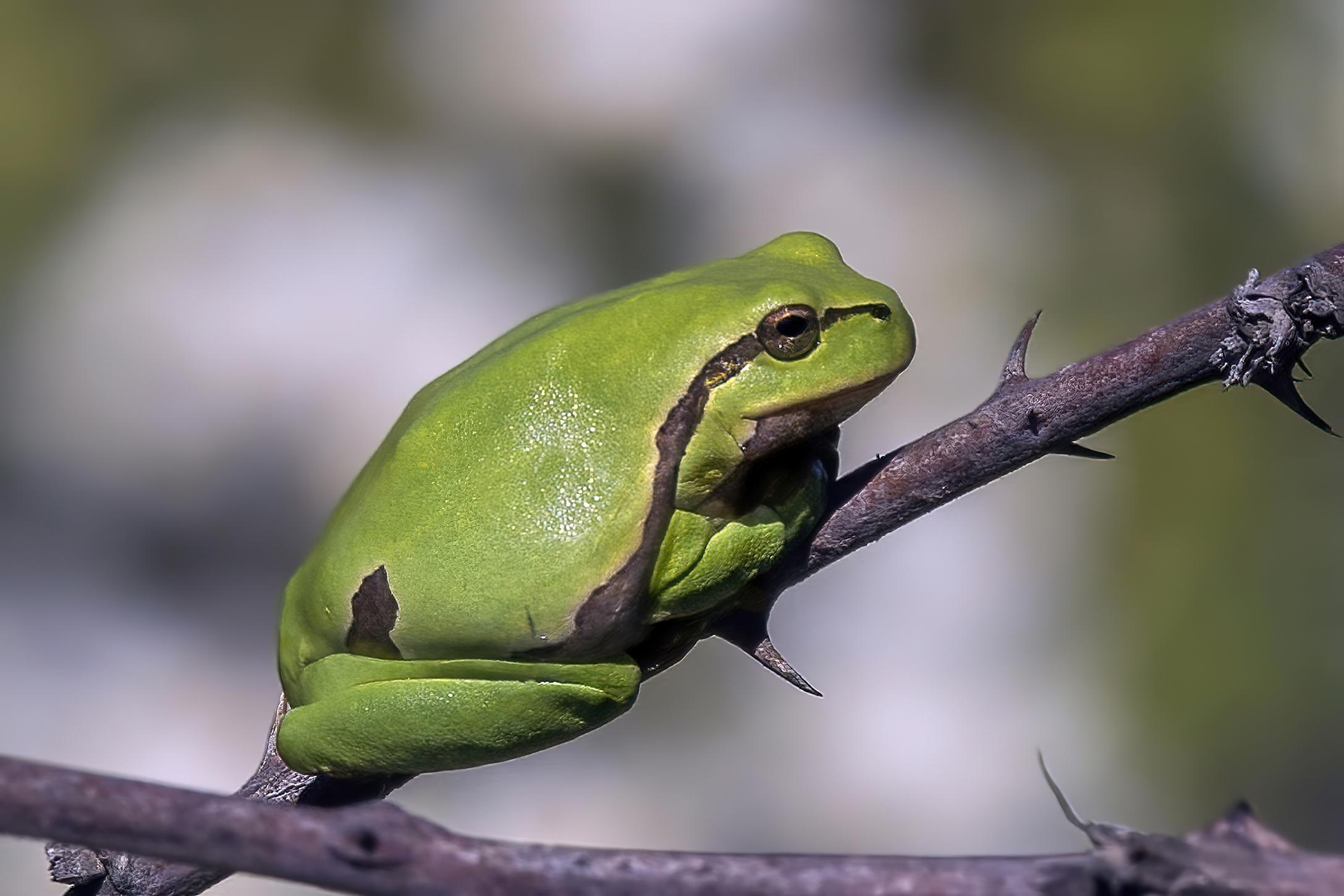
Hyla arborea

===== Amphibians =====
Threatened in Europe, but not in Greece.

- Salamandra salamandra
- Triturus vulgaris
- Pelobates syriacus
- Bombina variegata
- Bufo bufo
- Bufo viridis
- Hyla arborea

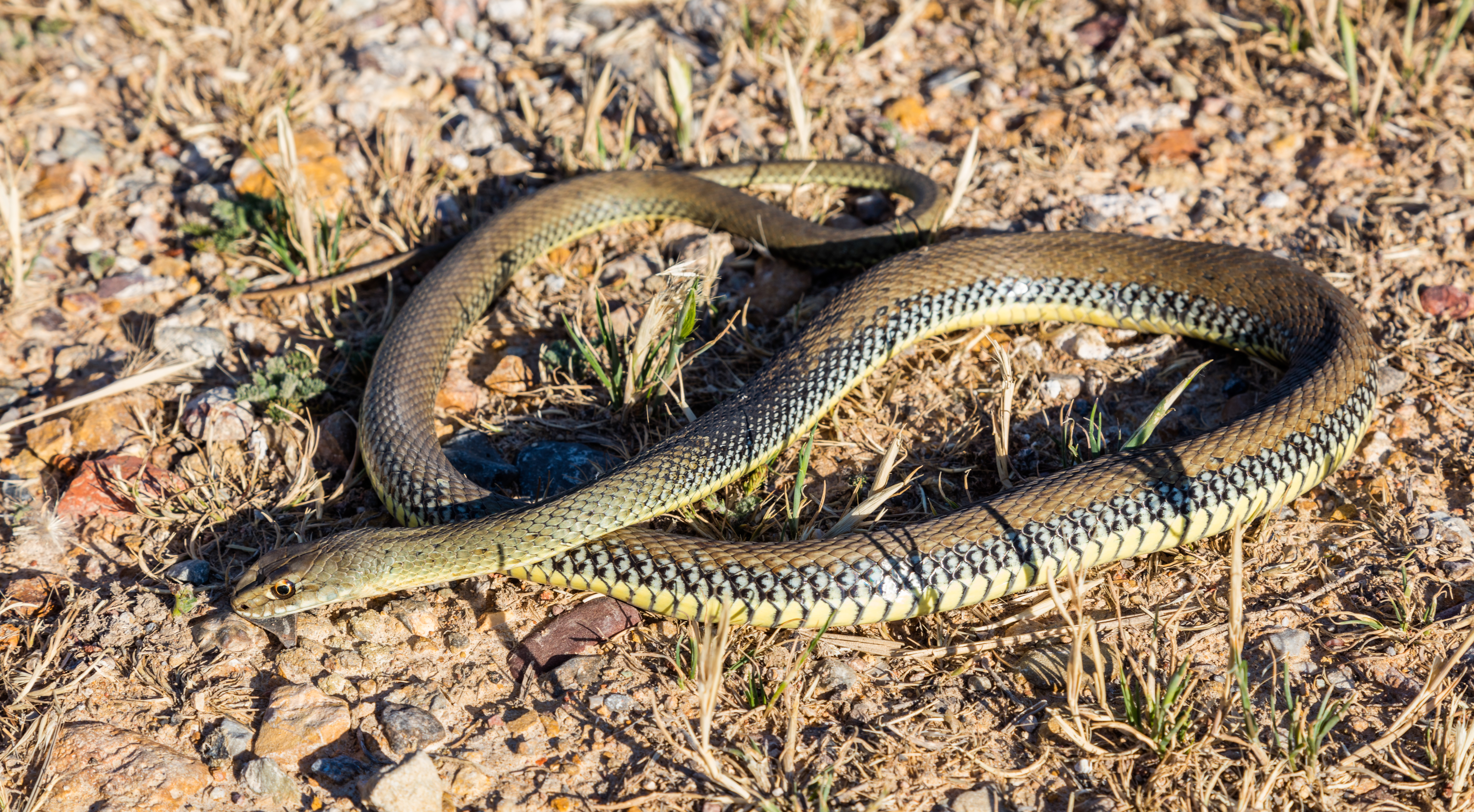
Malpolon monspessulanus

===== Reptiles =====
Many protected but not threatened in Greece, some endangered in Europe.

- Emys orbicularis
- Mauremys caspica
- Testudo hermanni
- Testudo graeca
- Cyrtopodion kotschyi
- Lacerta viridis
- Lacerta trilineata
- Podarcis taurica
- Podarcis erhardii
- Podarcis muralis
- Coluber jugularis
- Natrix natrix
- Natrix tessellata
- Malpolon monspessulanus
- Vipera ammodytes

===== Red Book Status Species =====
Based on the "Red Book of Threatened Vertebrates of Greece", 3 species that appear in the area are classified as endangered, 7 species have vulnerable populations at risk of becoming endangered, 3 species are classified as rare, and 4 species are insufficiently known, which means they are rare but lack sufficient data for further classification.

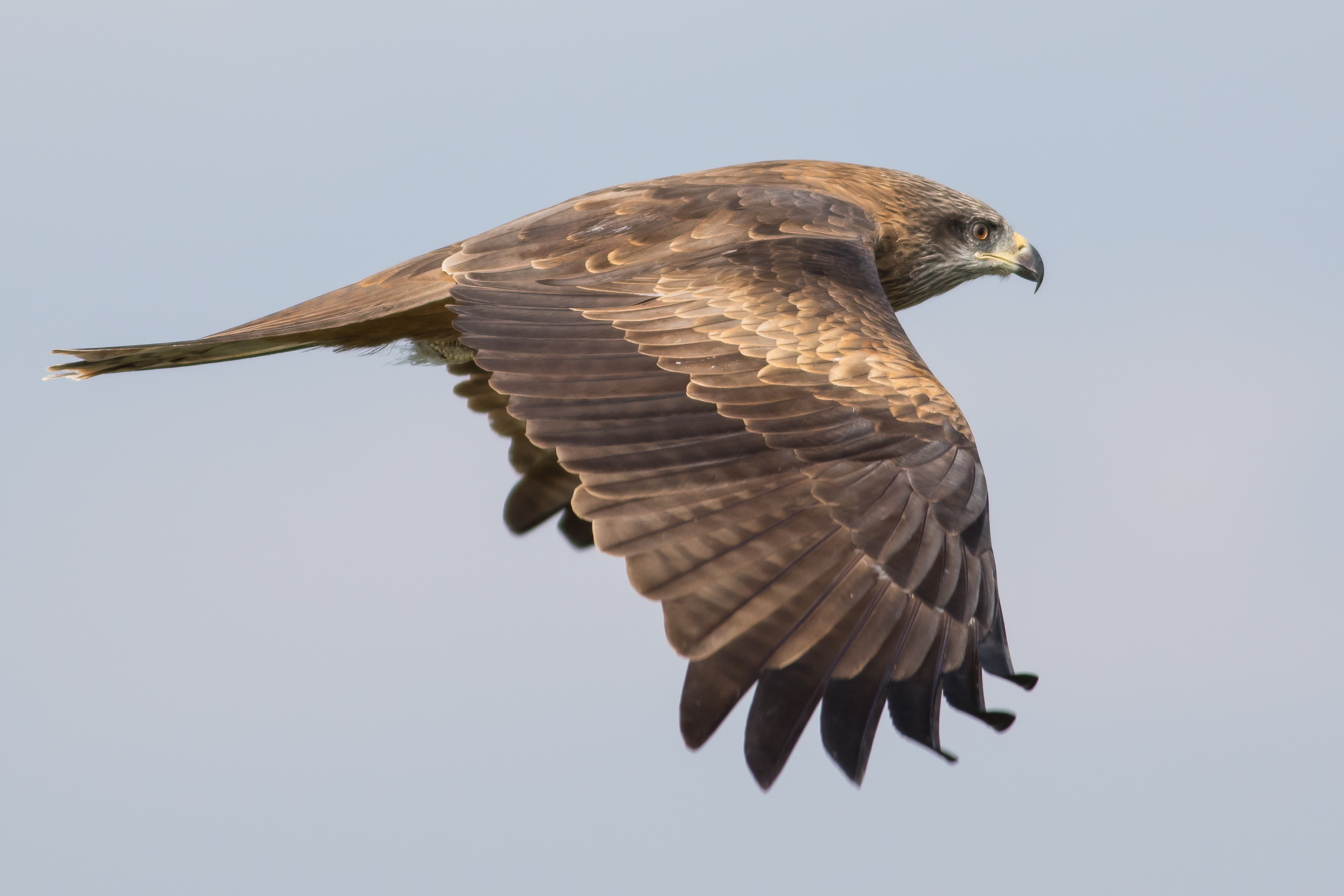
Milvus migrans, an extremely rare bird that may occur in the Metaxades area

====== Endangered ======
- Ciconia nigra
- Milvus migrans
- Aegypius monachus

====== Vulnerable ======
- Neophron percnopterus
- Gyps fulvus
- Circus aeruginosus
- Aquila pomarina
- Aquila chrysaetos
- Hieraaetus pennatus
- Coracias garrulus

====== Rare ======
- Picus canus
- Oenanthe isabellina

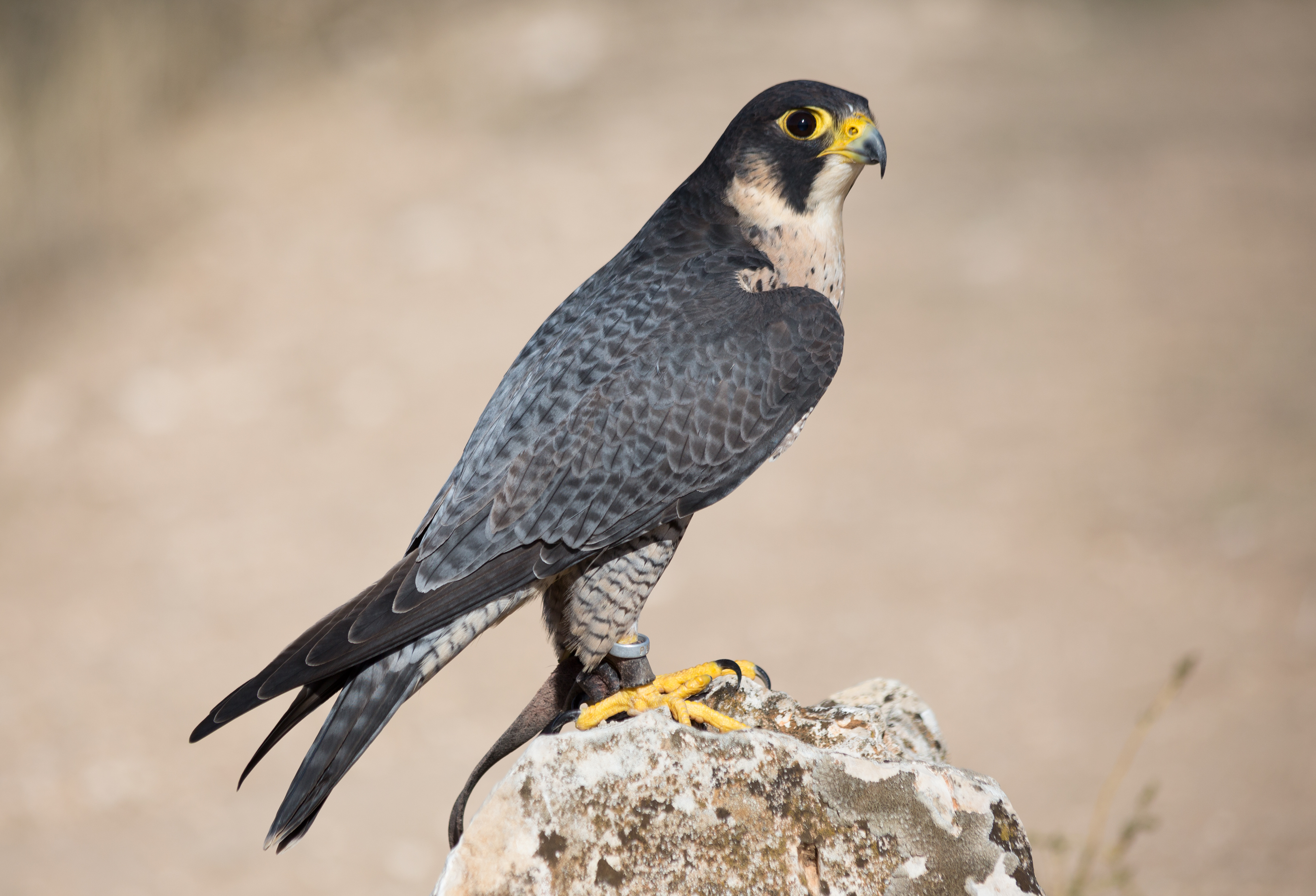
Falco peregrinus

====== Insufficiently Known ======
- Nycticorax nycticorax
- Falco eleonorae
- Falco peregrinus
- Coturnix coturnix
- Lanius minor

===== Mammals =====
Endemic or threatened mammal species include:

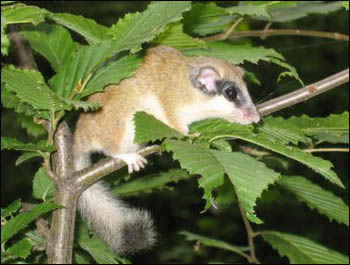
Dryomys nitedula

====== Vulnerable ======
- Canis lupus
- Lutra lutra
- Spalax leucodon

====== Rare ======
- Dryomys nitedula

====== Insufficiently Known ======
- Neomys anomalus

== Demographics ==
Today, the village is inhabited exclusively by Greeks, most of whom are elderly. There are a few young people, with most children attending school and most adults working either in the fields or in nearby villages or cities.

The demographic makeup includes descendants of approximately four families from Epirus who settled in the village and bear the surname "Arvanitidis". Historically, the residents spoke the Thracian dialect of Greek and did not live in segregated neighborhoods based on their origins.

=== Decline of residents ===
Metaxades, like all the other villages in the region and the Evros prefecture in general, is experiencing a serious and seemingly irreversible decline in population, along with a significant drop in birth rates compared to death rates, a reflection of the broader demographic crisis in Greece.

==== Systemic neglect ====
The demographic problem of Metaxades extends beyond demographic figures. Everyday hardships such as frequent power outages, the lack of adequate maintenance and improvement of the road network, the gradual shutdown or merging of essential public services (such as schools, citizens' service centers, post offices, and rural health clinics), along with the absence of job opportunities, make life in the region increasingly difficult. The overall sense of abandonment by the state reinforces feelings of decline and frustration among residents, making it even harder to reverse the trend.

Other reasons include the great distance from administrative centers, the adverse weather conditions faced by the inhabitants during the winter, in addition to the collapse of secondary production and the problems in the reconstruction of primary production.

All these lead to a consequent reduction in job positions and insurmountable difficulties in living, leading the border inhabitants of the Evros Prefecture to urbanization and internal and external migration. Naturally, all these occur without the involvement of the Greek state, as there are no organized efforts to create incentives that would keep the inhabitants in the rural villages.

==== Migration ====
After the turmoil of the wars, Metaxades, like other villages in Greece, suffered severe damage. The traditional economic system of the area, based on agriculture and animal husbandry, was no longer viable. Combined with the development of factories in major cities, many villagers emigrated abroad or to the big cities of Greece to find employment. This led to a decrease in population and a decline in the production of goods.

Migration began in the 1960s and continues to this day. Migrants mainly headed to the countries of Western Europe, such as Germany, Belgium, and the Netherlands, but also to the United States and Australia. There was also significant migration within the country, such as to Athens and Thessaloniki.

Migration from the Evros had a significant impact on the social and economic life of the area. Communities that lost a large part of their population face various challenges today, such as infrastructure degradation and loss of cultural identity.

=== Population censuses ===
According to the population census of 2021, the municipal unit of Metaxades has a total of 2.387 inhabitants, while the village itself has 494 inhabitants .

Year	Men	Women	Total
1920	589	704	1.293
1928	744	741	1.485
1940	849	881	1.730
1951	–	-	1.541
1961	–	-	1.691
1971	–	-	1.177
1981	–	-	1.244
1991	–	-	1.026
2001	–	-	874
2011	–	-	719
2021	–	–	494

=== Notable people ===
- Giannis Mantoudis (1881–1962), former mayor of the community of Metaxades (1920–1923)
- Athanasios Papapanagiotou (1886–?), doctor and the first Member of Parliament for Evros with the Party of Democratic Union (1926–1928)
- Sotiris Terzoudis (1961–), former Chief of the Hellenic Fire Service (2018)
- Christos Kissoudis (1982–), traditional folk dance teacher, choir director, and president of the community of Metaxades (2019–)

== In popular culture ==
- The Greek dramatic film Christmas Tango (2011), directed by Nikolas Koutelidakis, was partly filmed in Metaxades.
- The popular Greek folk song "Vasilkouda" or "Sto Chorion Metaxades" recounts the life of Giannis Mantoudis, also known as "Giannis the Mayor", a notable figure from Metaxades who experienced multiple marriages and personal hardships, ultimately finding happiness with his fourth wife, Vasiliki Bakaloudi (Vasilkouda).

== Sources ==
- Fine, John V. A. (1994) [1987]. The Late Medieval Balkans: A Critical Survey from the Late Twelfth Century to the Ottoman Conquest. Ann Arbor, Michigan: University of Michigan Press. ISBN 978-0-472-10079-8.
- Gregory, Timothy E.; Ševčenko, Nancy Patterson (1991). "Adrianople". In Kazhdan, Alexander (ed.). The Oxford Dictionary of Byzantium. Oxford and New York: Oxford University Press. p. 23. ISBN 0-19-504652-8.
- Imber, Colin (2002). The Ottoman Empire, 1300–1650: The Structure of Power (First ed.). Basingstoke: Palgrave Macmillan. ISBN 978-0-3336-1386-3.
- İnalcık, Halil (1994). Kuruluş Dönemi Osmanlı Sultanları (in Turkish). İSAM. ISBN 978-605-5586-06-5.
- Roshwald, Aviel (2013). "Part II. The Emergence of Nationalism: Politics and Power – Nationalism in the Middle East, 1876–1945". In Breuilly, John (ed.). The Oxford Handbook of the History of Nationalism. Oxford and New York: Oxford University Press. pp. 220–241. doi:10.1093/oxfordhb/9780199209194.013.0011. ISBN 9780191750304.
- Smith, Roger W. (Spring 2015). "Introduction: The Ottoman Genocides of Armenians, Assyrians, and Greeks". Genocide Studies International. 9 (1). Toronto: University of Toronto Press: 1–9. doi:10.3138/GSI.9.1.01. ISSN 2291-1855. JSTOR 26986011. S2CID 154145301.
- Zachariadou, Elizabeth (1970). "The Conquest of Adrianople by the Turks". Studii Veneziani. 12: 211–217.
