= 2021 Evros floods =

- Date: 12 January 2021–February 2021
- Location: Greece, Turkey
- Cause: Overflooding of the Erythropotamos and Evros rivers, climate change
- Deaths: 1
- Property damage: Damaged houses, businesses, roads and bridges

During the period of 12 January and February 2021, the rivers Erythropotamos (Greek: Ερυθροπόταμος) and Evros (Greek: Έβρος) also known as Maritsa (Bulgarian: Марица, Turkish: Meriç) overflowed twice because of heavy rainstorms resulting in severe floods of the areas around the rivers, that led to 1 death and serious damages to private and public property. The floods were described by the media and residents as "one of the biggest disasters the area has ever faced".

Residents of the area were forced to abandon their cars and homes because of the rising, powerful floodwaters. The residents of the southern area of the village Polia were forced to evacuate because of a broken embankment in the area, and were taken by bus to a hotel in Didymoteicho temporarily, to prevent injuries and deaths.

== Weather events ==
In early January, right after the Epiphany, it started raining for days. Not all areas were affected. On January 10 though, a large area of Thrace was affected by heavy and long rainfall. Τhe village of Mikro Dereio and the rivers starting to overflow on 12 January. The city of Alexandroupoli had a precipitation of 408mm while the village of Metaxades had a precipitation of 203mm in January 2021.

After the rainfall the temperature remained below freezing, causing some of the flooded areas not to dry. With the temperatures being cold for days, a heavy snowstorm started in the area.

A few days later, after the snow started to melt, a new heavy rainfall started in the region of Evros on 1 February 2021, triggering aggravated floods in the areas of Soufli and Alexandroupoli.

== Timeline of events on 12 January ==
In the morning hours of 12 January 2021, the village of Mikro Dereio was flooded and evacuated. Many houses including the central square of the village were flooded and local authorities were present in the area for hours. Residents managed to get inside the village church to save themselves. Schools in Mikro Dereio were closed on the spot. At the same time, an iron bridge was destroyed by the water pressure in the village Loutra near Alexandroupoli. The bridge used to connect the two sides of the village. Warning signs were placed by the authorities of the Municipality of Alexandroupoli.

Few hours later, Bulgaria opened up the Ivaylovgrad Dam, releasing large amounts of water in the Evros river.

Around 14:00, the river of Erythropotamos started exceeding the expected levels and reached the top of the embankment around the river. In the meantime, the fields around Metaxades started to flood.

Around 15:00, a bus carrying passengers from Alexandroupoli to Orestiada was trapped at the Feres agency, unable to go anywhere because of all the roads being blocked due to floods.

Teachers that worked in Alexandroupoli were unable to return to their home, and that resulted in them staying in Feres and Tychero all day.

Around 16:00, Erythropotamos overflowed and embankments broke, causing severe damage to fields and properties around the area of many villages of the Didymoteicho municipality.

A few minutes later, the General Regional Police Directorate of Eastern Macedonia & Thrace announced the cessation of traffic on the National Road Ardaniou - Ormeniou (A21), from the settlement of Provatona to the District of Dadia.

Around 17:00, the village of Poros was evacuated because of the overflow of the stream "Tsai" which led to the decision by the mayor of Alexandroupoli, Giannis Zampoukis. Around 19:00, the Bulgarian Ministry of Foreign Affairs announced that in the next few hours an increase in the water level of the rivers Arda and Erythropotamos is expected following the gradual and controlled release of water from the Ivaylovgrad Dam.

A few minutes later, The Police Department of Alexandroupoli decided to temporarily stop the traffic.

Around 20:30, the river level of Erythropotamos has exceeded the vigilance limit and has reached 5.81 meters with an alarm limit of 7 meters. At this time, many villages in the area of Erythropotamos flooded with severe damages in buildings and fields from powerful water pressure. The aqueduct in the area of Alepochori went underwater and this led to the water being cut off for Alepochori and Polia. Other villages experienced the same water issue but it wasn't critical damage.

In the meantime, the residents of the southern area of the village Polia were forced to evacuate their houses because of a broken embankment in the area, allowing floods to speed up, and were taken by a bus to a hotel in Didymoteicho temporarily, to prevent injuries and deaths.

Around 23:00, the road between the villages Polia and Avdella was cut in half due to water pressure. Under that road were optical fibers for internet and telephones, which were cut apart. That led to telecommunications being unavailable in Alepochori.

== Timeline of events on 1 February ==
From the early hours of 1 February 2021, heavy rainfall started to hit the region of Evros. Because of a previous snowstorm, snow was melting all over the region. The snow melting in combination with the heavy rainfall caused new serious floods in many areas.

Around 10:30, military vehicles and vehicles of the municipality of Alexandroupoli went to the settlement of Apalos in order to transport the children of the Kindergarten, where the power cut off and the ground floor started to flood, to the church of the village so that the parents could pick them up.

At the same time, the municipality of Alexandroupoli announced the suspension of the operation of all school units in Apalos. The settlements of Antheia and Maistros face serious problems as the water level is constantly rising.

Around 11:00, streets in Soufli and Agnantia flooded and the authorities was present in areas needing help.

Around 12:00, in High School of Antheia, students and teachers were trapped inside. Also, traffic was stopped on the National Road Ardaniou - Ormeniou (A21), from the village Thymaria to Provatonas.

Around 13:00, students were trapped in the school of Apalos, and for this reason a rescue operation was set up by the fire brigade. During the operation, however, the 46-year-old Chief Firefighter Zafeiropoulos Ioannis, driver of a fire truck that participated in the efforts and "stuck" in the rainwater, as he was walking away, was swept away by the rushing waters and was found dead near the airport streams. Two other colleagues were in the vehicle, who managed to get out safely. His death caused pan-Hellenic shock and mourning.

Around 16:00, the national road and many streets were flooded. Many fields were destroyed and some houses were damaged.

Later that day, announcements from the mayor of Alexandroupoli were made about the suspension of schools in Apalos and Antheia due to dangers and due to damages on buildings.

== Aftermath ==
The two big floods led to serious damages in villages and fields. Walls of warehouses and garages were completely torn down by the force of the water. Houses were flooded inside and destroyed furniture and personal items of residents. Many farmers had significant loss due to field and agricultural vehicle damage.

Some areas of the embankments in Alepochori and Polia were broken, leaving the area vulnerable for future floods. The broken embankments also restrict farmers and residents from visiting specific areas because of destroyed paths.

Some machines in the aqueducts were damaged due to being under water during the floods, which led to the water being cut off for about a week. As a result, the inhabitants of some settlements were forced to carry buckets of water from water sources in the wider area of their places of residence. A few days later, in consultation with the authorities, the mayors and the presidents of the cities and settlements, bottles of water were sent to each resident.

Some roads were destroyed, which have led to major traffic inconveniences. Under the road that collapsed in Avdella, there were optical fibers which were responsible for the internet connection and for the interconnection of the landlines in the villages of Alepochori and Polia. This led to severe optical fiber damage that took about two months to repair, leaving children unable to attend e-learning (which was mandatory of a general COVID-19 lockdown that was going on since November) for weeks until a solution was to be found.

The most tragic event of the floods is the death of the 46-year-old firefighter Ioannis Zafeiropoulos, who was the father of three children and participated in an operation to free students from school due to the floods. He gave up his last breath, in his attempt to free students in a school in the area of Apalos.
