= Church of Saint Athanasius (Metaxades) =

Church building in Greece

- Post-Byzantine Church of Saint Athanasius
- Interactive map of Church of Saint Athanasius
- Location: Metaxades
- Coordinates: 41°25′02″N 26°13′32″E
- Builder: Unknown
- Material: Limestone
- Completion date: Unknown, probably 1695
- Restored date: Multiple times
- Dedicated to: Saint Athanasius

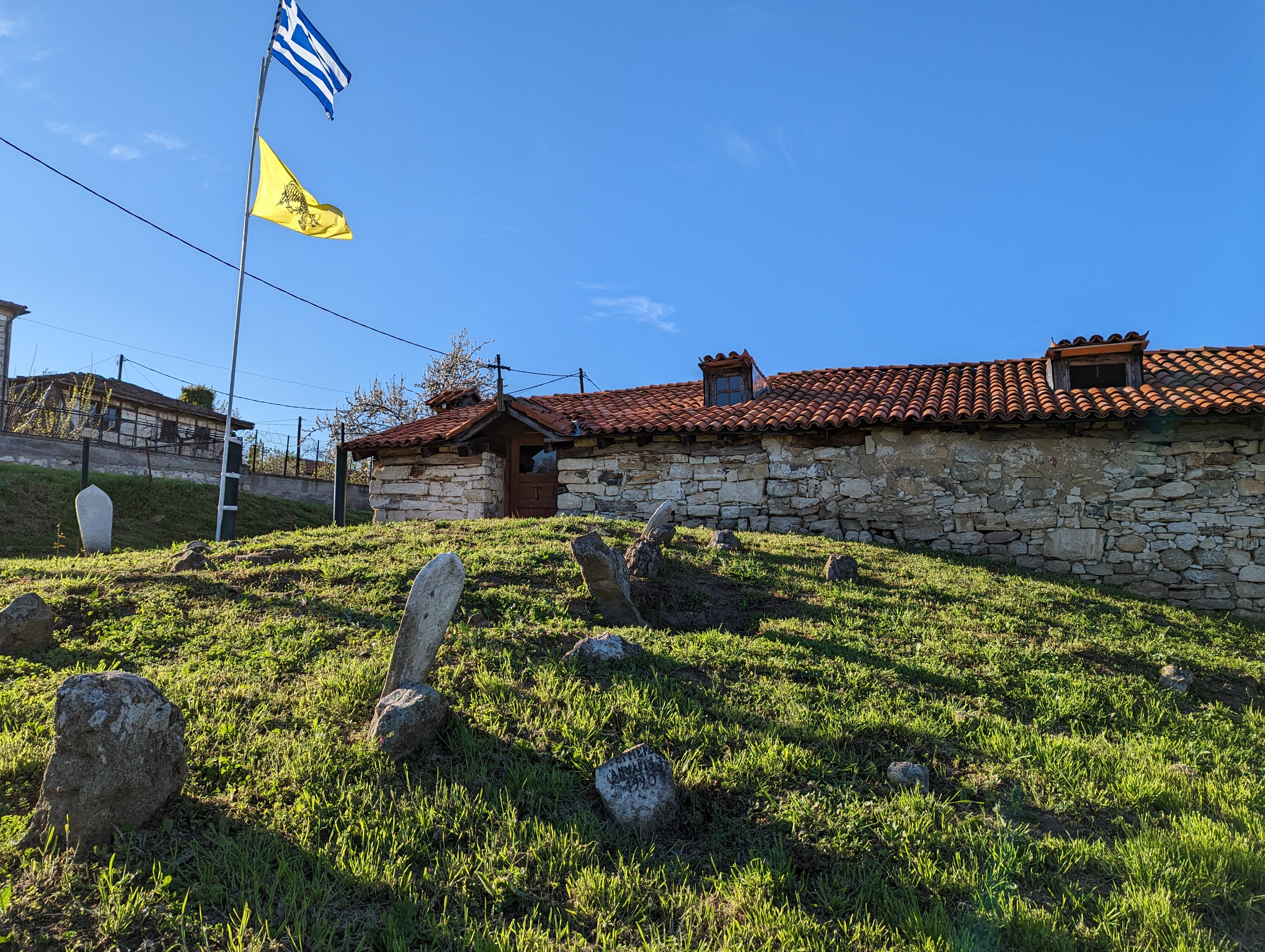
Church of Saint Athanasius

The Church of Saint Athanasius is a post-Byzantine church located in Metaxades, Greece. It is located on the southeast side of the village and was probably built around 1695. It is one of the three post-Byzantine churches in the area, of which the other two are the Church of Saint Athanasius located in Alepochori and the Church of Saint Pantaleon in Paliouri.

== History ==
The church is almost unknown in the scientific literature, the cemetery, however, which extends to its north and east, is considered the oldest and best preserved in Evros, with the oldest inscription bearing the date 1691.

According to other sources, the frescoes of the temple were probably created by a refugee from Constantinople, before or after the Fall, and that the temple may be much older, from the 11th century. Evidence that verifies these dates is the icon of Virgin Mary of Metaxades from the 15th century and the Cross from the 16th century, which testify to the long history of the church that connects it to the history of the Byzantine Empire.

Today, an important part of its hagiographies has been destroyed by time and by human interventions, while the walls of the temple began to recede and from the roof, where water enters. In 2020, a team of the Ministry of Culture and Sports visited the site for the restoration and restoration project of the three post-Byzantine churches in the Metaxades area. In 2023 the projects joined the Recovery Fund.

== Architecture ==
The church is semi-subterranean, introverted and no external feature reveals its use as a place of religious worship. It is a rectangular building, which the visitor enters by a ladder with a depth of 1.40m. The folklorist Georgios Megas analyzes the reasons that justify the architectural choices in the buildings of this period, saying that the shape of the churches is a result of the residents' fear of provoking the wrath of the Ottomans, as they often fell victim to the janissaries and delibasis that ravaged the region of Thrace with Constantinople as a springboard.
