= Filakto railway station =

Railway station in Filakto, Evros, Greece

Φυλακτό Filakto

General information
- Location: Filakto; Evros; Greece
- Coordinates: 41°03′10″N 26°16′46″E
- Owner: GAIAOSE
- Line: Alexandroupoli–Svilengrad railway
- Platforms: 1
- Tracks: 1
- Train operators: Hellenic Train

Construction
- Structure type: at-grade
- Platform levels: 1
- Parking: No
- Cycle facilities: No

Other information
- Status: Unstaffed
- Website: https://www.ose.gr/en/

History
- Electrified: No

Services
Preceding station	Hellenic Train	Following station
Tychero towards Alexandroupoli	G6 Alexandroupoli-Ormenio	Lagyna towards Ormenio
Location
- Location within Greece

Filakto railway stop (Greek: Σιδηροδρομική Στάση Φυλακτού, romanized: Sidirodromiki stasi Filakto) is a railway stop that serves the village of Filakto, Evros in Eastern Macedonia and Thrace, Greece. Located close to the village center, Today TrainOSE operates just 1 daily Regional trains to Alexandroupoli and Ormenio. The train stop is unstaffed

== History ==
The station lies on the line built by the Chemins de fer Orientaux (CO), from Istanbul to Vienna. A 112 km branch from Pythio to Alexandroupoli (then known as Dedeağaç) was opened in 1874. When the railway was built, it was all within the Ottoman Empire. After World War I and the subsequent Greek-Turkish War from 1919 to 1922, and finally peace in the form of the Lausanne treaty, the Chemins de fer Orientaux (CO) ended up having a network straddling Turkey and Greece, Didymoteicho became part of Greece and the line administrated by Greece.

In 1920 it became part Hellenic State Railways. In late 1970 the Hellenic State Railways was reorganised. On 31 December 1970, Hellenic State Railways ceased to exist; the following day all railways in Greece (with the exception of private industrial lines and E.I.S.) were transferred to Hellenic Railways Organisation S.A., a state-owned corporation, responsible for most for Greece's rail infrastructure and passenger services.

In 2009, with the Greek debt crisis unfolding OSE's Management was forced to reduce services across the network. Timetables were cut back, and routes closed as the government-run entity attempted to reduce overheads. Services from Orestiada to Alexandroupoli were cut back to three trains a day, reducing the reliability of services and passenger numbers. On 13 February 2011, due to the Greek financial crisis and subsequent budget cuts by the Greek government, all international services were suspended. As a result, all cross-border routes were closed and international services (to Istanbul, Sofia, etc.) ended. Thus, only two routes now connect Didymoteicho with Thessaloniki and Athens (and those with a connection to Alex / Polis), while route time increased as the network was "upgraded".

In 2014 TrainOSE replaced services to/from Dikaia with buses In 2017 OSE's passenger transport sector was privatised as TrainOSE, currently a wholly owned subsidiary of Ferrovie dello Stato Italiane infrastructure, including stations remained under the control of OSE. In July 2022, the station began being served by Hellenic Train, the rebranded TrainOSE.

Following the Tempi crash, Hellenic Train announced rail replacement bus's on certain routes across the Greek rail network, starting Wednesday 15 March 2023.

In August 2025, the Greek Ministry of Infrastructure and Transport confirmed the creation of a new body, Greek Railways (Greek: Σιδηρόδρομοι Ελλάδος, romanized: Ellinikí Sidiródromi Monoprósopi) to assume responsibility for rail infrastructure, planning, modernisation projects, and rolling stock across Greece. Previously, these functions were divided among several state-owned entities: OSE, which managed infrastructure; ERGOSÉ, responsible for modernisation projects; and GAIAOSÉ, which owned stations, buildings, and rolling stock. OSE had overseen both infrastructure and operations until its vertical separation in 2005. Rail safety has been identified as a key priority. The merger follows the July approval of a Parliamentary Bill to restructure the national railway system, a direct response to the Tempi accident of February 2023, in which 43 people died after a head-on collision.

== Facilities ==
The Filakto train strop is only equipped with only bus 'like' shelter on a single short platform, with no digital display screens or timetable poster boards. Has no toilet facilities; as a result, the station is currently little more than an unstaffed halt. However infrequent buses do call at the stop.

== Services ==
As of 2020, the train stop is only served by one daily pair of regional trains Alexandroupoli–Ormenio. There is also a bus stop at the station.

As of October 2024 all services are run as a rail-replacement bus service.

== Station Layout ==
Ground level		Exit
Level; Ε1	Side platform, doors will open on the right/left
Level; Ε1	Platform 1Α	→ towards Ormenio (Lagyna) →
Level; Ε1	Platform 1Β	→ towards Alexandroupoli (Tychero) ←
