= Tychero =

Town in East Macedonia and Thrace, Greece

Tychero Τυχερό
- Municipal unit
- Location within the regional unit

- Location within Greece
- Coordinates: 41°01′N 26°17′E
- Country: Greece
- Administrative region: East Macedonia and Thrace
- Regional unit: Evros
- Municipality: Soufli

Area
  - Municipal unit: 220.4 km^{2} (85.1 sq mi)
- Elevation: 40 m (130 ft)

Population (2021)
  - Municipal unit: 2,647
  - Municipal unit density: 12.01/km^{2} (31.11/sq mi)
  - Community: 1,483
- Time zone: UTC+2 (EET)
  - Summer (DST): UTC+3 (EEST)
- Vehicle registration: EB

Tycheró (Greek: Τυχερό, [tiçeˈro]) is a town and a former municipality in the Evros regional unit, East Macedonia and Thrace, Greece. Since the 2011 local government reform it is part of the municipality Soufli, of which it is a municipal unit. The municipal unit has an area of 220.411 km^{2}. Tychero is situated near the river Evros, which forms the border with Turkey here.

== History ==
Under Ottoman rule Tychero was known as Bıdıklı (Greek: Μπίντικλι). After the Balkan Wars (1912-1913) it became part of Bulgaria, and it became part of Greece in 1920. It was renamed to Tychio, which was changed to the current name Tychero in 1953. In February 2006 Tychero was struck by a flood of the Evros river. The town is populated by Arvanites originally from Ibriktepe, now in Turkey.

== Subdivisions ==
The municipal unit Tychero is subdivided into the following communities (constituent villages in brackets):

- Fylakto
- Lefkimmi
- Lyra
- Provatonas (Provatonas, Tavri, Thymaria)
- Tychero

== Population ==
Year	Community	Municipal unit
1991	2,004	4,188
2001	2,031	4,103
2011	2,311	4,010
2021	1,483	2,647

== Transport ==
=== Road ===
The Greek National Road 51/E85 (Alexandroupoli - Orestiada - Ormenio) passes west of the town. Tychero is located south of Soufli, south-southwest of Orestiada, northwest of İpsala (Turkey), north of Feres and northeast of Alexandroupoli.

=== Rail ===
The settlement is served by a railway station on the Alexandroupoli–Svilengrad line.
