= Lagyna railway station =

Railway station in Greece

Λαγυνά Lagyna

General information
- Location: Lagyna; Evros; Greece
- Coordinates: 41°05′10″N 26°18′05″E
- Owner: GAIAOSE
- Line: Alexandroupoli–Svilengrad railway
- Platforms: 3
- Tracks: 3 (1 disused)
- Train operators: Hellenic Train

Construction
- Structure type: at-grade
- Platform levels: 1
- Parking: No
- Cycle facilities: No

Other information
- Status: Unstaffed
- Website: http://www.ose.gr/en/

History
- Electrified: No

Services
Preceding station	Hellenic Train	Following station
Filakto towards Alexandroupoli	G6 Alexandroupoli-Ormenio	Soufli towards Ormenio
Location
- Location within Greece

Lagyna railway station (Greek: Σιδηροδρομικός Σταθμός Λαγυνά, romanized: Sidirodromikós stathmós Lagyna) is a railway station that serves the village of Lagyna, Evros in Eastern Macedonia and Thrace, Greece. Located close to the village centre, the station was (when) by the Chemins de fer Orientaux, (now part of OSE). Today Hellenic Train operates just 4 daily Regional trains to Alexandroupoli and Ormenio. The station is unstaffed however there are waiting rooms available. Didymoteicho is one of the northernmost operational railway stations in Greece.

== History ==
The inhabitants came as refugees in 1922 from the village of Küplü (Küplü = big hare, Turkish: Küplü) of Eastern Thrace. The Lagyna railway station was built in the middle of the 20th century.

In late 1970 the Hellenic State Railways was reorganised. On 31 December 1970, Hellenic State Railways ceased to exist; the following day, all railways in Greece (with the exception of private industrial lines and E.I.S.) were transferred to Hellenic Railways Organisation S.A., a state-owned corporation, responsible for most for Greece's rail infrastructure and passenger services.

In the 1990s, OSE introduced the InterCity service to the Alexandroupoli–Svilengrad line Which reduced travel times across the whole line.

In 2009, with the Greek debt crisis unfolding OSE's Management was forced to reduce services across the network. Timetables were cut back, and routs closed as the government-run entity attempted to reduce overheads. Services from Orestiada to Alexandroupoli were cut back to three trains a day, reducing the reliability of services and passenger numbers. On 13 February 2011, all international services were suspended due to the Greek financial crisis and subsequent budget cuts by the Greek government. As a result, all cross-border routes were closed, and international services (to Istanbul, Sofia, etc.) ended. Thus, only two routes now connect Didymoteicho with Thessaloniki and Athens (and those with a connection to Alex / Polis), while route time increased as the network was "upgraded".

In 2014 TrainOSE replaced services to/from Dikaia with buses In 2017 OSE's passenger transport sector was privatised as TrainOSE, currently, a wholly owned subsidiary of Ferrovie dello Stato Italiane infrastructure, including stations, remained under the control of OSE. In July 2022, the station began being served by Hellenic Train, the rebranded TrainOSE.

Following the Tempi crash, Hellenic Train announced rail replacement bus's on certain routes across the Greek rail network, starting Wednesday 15 March 2023.

In August 2025, the Greek Ministry of Infrastructure and Transport confirmed the creation of a new body, Greek Railways (Greek: Σιδηρόδρομοι Ελλάδος, romanized: Ellinikí Sidiródromi Monoprósopi) to assume responsibility for rail infrastructure, planning, modernisation projects, and rolling stock across Greece. Previously, these functions were divided among several state-owned entities: OSE, which managed infrastructure; ERGOSÉ, responsible for modernisation projects; and GAIAOSÉ, which owned stations, buildings, and rolling stock. OSE had overseen both infrastructure and operations until its vertical separation in 2005. Rail safety has been identified as a key priority. The merger follows the July approval of a Parliamentary Bill to restructure the national railway system, a direct response to the Tempi accident of February 2023, in which 43 people died after a head-on collision.

== Facilities ==
The original station buildings are rundown and almost abandoned. As of (2020) the station is unstaffed.

== Services ==
As of 2020, Lagyna is only serviced by one daily pair of Regional trains, Alexandroupoli–Ormenio.

Between July 2005 and February 2011 the Friendship Express (an international InterCity train jointly operated by the Turkish State Railways (TCDD) and TrainOSE linking Istanbul's Sirkeci Terminal, Turkey and Thessaloniki, Greece) passed through Lagyna, but did not call at the station.

As of October 2024 all services are run as a rail-replacement bus service.

== Station layout ==
L Ground/Concourse	Customer service	Tickets/Exits
Level; Ε1	Side platform, doors will open on the right
Level; Ε1	Platform 3	In non-regular use
Level; Ε1	Island platform, doors open on the right/left
Level; Ε1	Platform 1	→ towards Alexandroupoli (Filakto) ←
Level; Ε1	Island platform, doors to the left
Level; Ε1	Platform 2	→ towards Ormenio (Soufli) →
