= Pylaia, Evros =

Pylaia Πυλαία
- Community
- Location within Greece
- Coordinates: 40°56′N 26°7′E
- Country: Greece
- Administrative region: East Macedonia and Thrace
- Regional unit: Evros
- Municipality: Alexandroupoli
- Municipal unit: Feres

Population (2021)
  - Community: 102
- Time zone: UTC+2 (EET)
  - Summer (DST): UTC+3 (EEST)
- Vehicle registration: EB

Pylaia (Greek: Πυλαία) is a village in the municipal unit of Feres, in the southern part of the Evros regional unit, northeastern Greece. In 2021 its population was 102 for the community, including the villages Melia and Koila. It is located 6 km northwest of Feres and northeast of Alexandroupoli.

== See also ==
- List of settlements in the Evros regional unit
