= Peplos railway station =

Railway station in Greece

Πέπλος Peplos

General information
- Location: Peplos; Evros; Greece
- Coordinates: 40°57′34″N 26°16′36″E
- Owner: GAIAOSE
- Line: Alexandroupoli–Svilengrad railway
- Platforms: 2
- Tracks: 2
- Train operators: Hellenic Train
- Bus routes: Alexandroupoli Port, Dikaia
- Connections: Bus

Construction
- Structure type: at-grade
- Platform levels: 1
- Parking: Yes
- Cycle facilities: No

Other information
- Status: Unstaffed
- Website: http://www.ose.gr/en/

History
- Opened: 1896
- Electrified: No

Services
Preceding station	Hellenic Train	Following station
Feres towards Alexandroupoli	G6 Alexandroupoli-Ormenio	Tychero towards Ormenio
Location
- Location within Greece

Peplos railway station (Greek: Σιδηροδρομικός Σταθμός Πέπλος, romanized: Sidirodromikós stathmós Peplos) is a railway station that serves the town of Peplos, Evros in Eastern Macedonia and Thrace, Greece. Located around 900 metres (3,000 ft) east of the town centre, the station opened by the Chemins de fer Orientaux, (now part of OSE). Today Hellenic Train operates one daily pair of Regional trains to Alexandroupoli and Ormenio. The station is an unstaffed halt; however, there are waiting rooms available if open.

== History ==
The station was opened in 1874, two years after the line from Alexandroupoli (then Dedeagac) to Istanbul via Edirne was completed. Built by the Chemins de fer Orientaux (CO), from Istanbul to Vienna. The railway reached Ftelia in 1873, when the line from Istanbul to Edirne and Bulgaria was opened. When the railway was built it was all within the Ottoman Empire. Feres (Ottoman: Feretzik) was one of the stations on this line.

During World War I, the railway was an important link as the Ottoman Empire, Bulgaria, and Austria-Hungary were all Central Allies. Following the defeat of the Ottoman Empire, its remaining imperial possessions were divided. The sections from Alexandroupoli to Svilengrad, except for a short section of about 10 kilometres (6.2 mi) in Turkey serving Edirne Karaagaç station and for 3 kilometres (1.9 mi) between the Greek border and Svilengrad station in Bulgaria come under the control of the French-Hellenic Railway Company (CFFH), a subsidiary of the CO, when the CFFH was incorporated in July 1929.

Under the Treaty of Lausanne of 1923, a new border between Greece and Turkey was established at the Evros river, just east of Peplos railway station, which the result that the railway from Istanbul to Bulgaria entered Greece at Pythio, then re-entered Turkey at Edirne (Karaağaç railway station), re-entered Greece at Marasia, and finally entered Bulgaria between Ormenio and Svilengrad. This arrangement continued until 1971 when two new lines were opened. In Turkey, the Edirne Cut-off was opened to allow trains from Istanbul to Bulgaria to run through Edirne entirely on Turkish territory so that trains such as the Orient Express no longer passed through Ormenio. In Greece, a line was opened to allow trains from Pythio to Bulgaria to stay on Greek territory and avoid Edirne. In 1954 the CFFH was absorbed by the Hellenic State Railways. In 1971, the Hellenic State Railways was reorganised into the OSE taking over responsibilities for most of Greece's rail infrastructure. In the 1990s, OSE introduced the InterCity service to the Alexandroupoli–Svilengrad line Which reduced travel times across the whole line.

In 2009, with the Greek debt crisis unfolding OSE's Management was forced to reduce services across the network. Timetables were cut back, and routes closed as the government-run entity attempted to reduce overheads. Services from Feres to Alexandroupoli were cut back to three trains a day, reducing the reliability of services and passenger numbers. With passenger footfall in sharp decline. On 11 February 2011, all cross-border routes were closed, and international services (to Istanbul, Sofia, etc.) were ended. Thus, only two routes now connect Feres with Thessaloniki and Athens (and those with a connection to Alex / Polis), while route time increased as the network was "upgraded". Services to/from Ormenio were replaced by bus. In 2014 TrainOSE replaced services to/from Dikaia with buses

In 2017 OSE's passenger transport sector was privatised as TrainOSE, currently a wholly owned subsidiary of Ferrovie dello Stato Italiane infrastructure, including stations, remained under the control of OSE. In July 2022, the station began being served by Hellenic Train, the rebranded TrainOSE.

Following the Tempi crash, Hellenic Train announced rail replacement bus's on certain routes across the Greek rail network, starting Wednesday 15 March 2023.

In August 2025, the Greek Ministry of Infrastructure and Transport confirmed the creation of a new body, Greek Railways (Greek: Σιδηρόδρομοι Ελλάδος, romanized: Ellinikí Sidiródromi Monoprósopi) to assume responsibility for rail infrastructure, planning, modernisation projects, and rolling stock across Greece. Previously, these functions were divided among several state-owned entities: OSE, which managed infrastructure; ERGOSÉ, responsible for modernisation projects; and GAIAOSÉ, which owned stations, buildings, and rolling stock. OSE had overseen both infrastructure and operations until its vertical separation in 2005. Rail safety has been identified as a key priority. The merger follows the July approval of a Parliamentary Bill to restructure the national railway system, a direct response to the Tempi accident of February 2023, in which 43 people died after a head-on collision.

== Facilities ==
The station is location on two levels, with the booking office, on one floor and waiting rooms on a lower level, there is a brick-built shelter on platform 1, but platform 2 is simply a raised platform Surface, with no equipment or facilities. For the last two decades the station has remained unstaffed

== Services ==
As of 2020, the station is only served by one daily pairs of regional trains Alexandroupoli–Ormenio.

As of October 2024 all services are run as a rail-replacement bus service.

The station is also severed by a limited number of regional buses: (as of 2024) Alexandroupoli Port 07:55, Dikaia 16:27 and Alexandroupoli Port 20:57.

== Station layout ==
L Ground/Concourse	Customer service	Tickets/Exits
Level; L1	Side platform, doors will open on the right
Level; L1	Platform 1	towards Ormenio (Tychero) ←
Level; L1	Island platform, doors will open on the right
Level; L1	Platform 2	towards Alexandroupolis (Feres) →
