= Church of Saint Athanasius (Alepochori, Evros) =

Monument in Alepochori, Evros, Greece

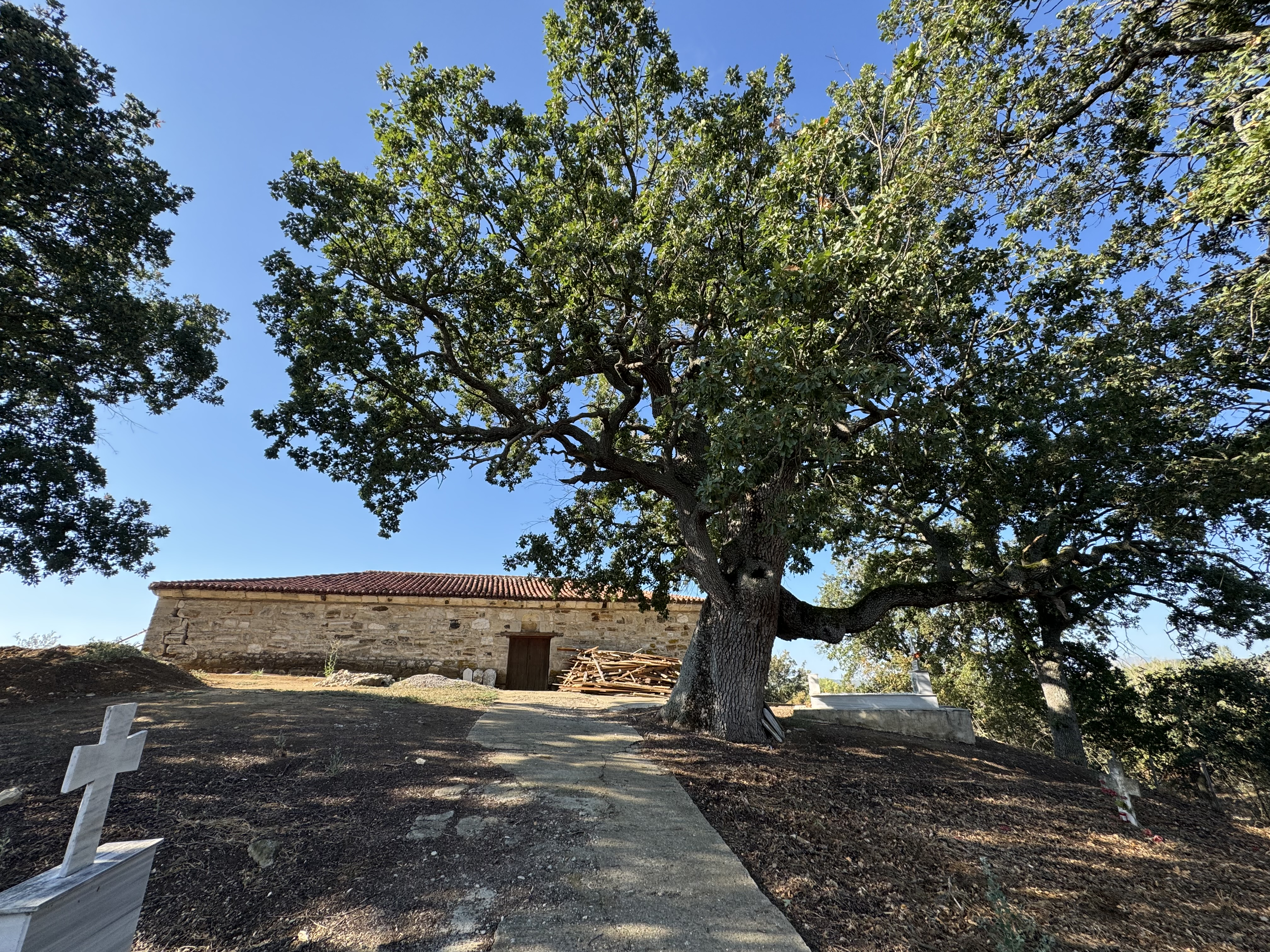
- Interactive map of Church of Saint Athanasius
- Location: Alepochori, Evros
- Coordinates: 41°26′55″N 26°12′24″E
- Type: Greek Orthodox church
- Material: Limestone
- Length: 17,12m
- Width: 7,30m
- Completion date: 1729; 297 years ago
- Dedicated to: Saint Athanasius

The Church of Saint Athanasius (Greek: Άγιος Αθανάσιος) is a small historical church located at the southern end of the village Alepochori in the Evros regional unit, built in the post-Byzantine era and specifically in 1729. It is best known for the fresco of a dog-headed Saint Christopher, something rare in Greece. Today it's a historical landmark. The inside of the church is closed to the public.

== Location ==
It is located in Alepochori, Evros, Greece. It is about 130 meters from the southernmost plot, in the area of the cemetery, on a small hill. Today it functions only as a cemetery, while in the past it also functioned as a parish church of the village. There are 3 post-Byzantine historical churches in the local area. Along with the post-Byzantine church of Saint Athanasius in Alepochori, there is Saint Athanasius in Metaxades (1695) and Saint Pantaleon in Paliouri (~18th century).

== History ==
It was built in 1729 by the Greek Orthodox community in the village secretly during the Ottoman era. Most of the church was built under the ground as a result of fear not to provoke the Ottomans, as the Greek community often fell victim to janissaries and delibasis who looted area of Thrace. It was used as a "secret school" during the Ottoman era, so the Greek alphabet and the Orthodox faith was learned to the minors.

It was designated as a historical monument in 1953. The old church operated till 1952, when a new church was built for the village.

== Design ==
It is made of limestone (the local stone from Metaxades), it is single-aisled and without Columns. Quite low and part of it in the ground. It has two entrances: one on the north side, while the main entrance is on the west side. The west side door was for women and the north door was for men.

It is built without windows, on which a wooden tiled roof is based, four-pitched, with a perimeter overhang of about 0.35m wide. The soil in the immediate vicinity of the church is covered with vegetation. According to the literature, the church was built in one phase, while its wall paintings dates back to 1729, according to a founding inscription, which is saved intact above the northern entrance of the main church (inside). Internally the church is divided, with by a plastered wooden partition, in a narthex and main part of church, which is separated from the sanctuary by a wooden iconostasis with two gates.

There are two entrances, with wooden double doors, one in the narthex on the west side and one in the main part of the church on the north side. The sanctuary ends in the semicircular apse with a hemispherical dome. In the north and the south wall of the sanctuary is formed by a niche with arch. In the dome of the apse there is an opening with a sloping upward direction, blind (with closed end), which served in the past, probably, the ventilation of the sanctuary. The wooden iconostasis is decorated with embossed elements, partially gilded and with written plant and geometric depictions. According to the literature, this is the original iconostasis of the church. In front of the iconostasis there are two stone carved Candlesticks. The floor of the building is paved with large, irregular slate slabs, joined with cement mortar.

== Rare representation of Saint Christopher ==
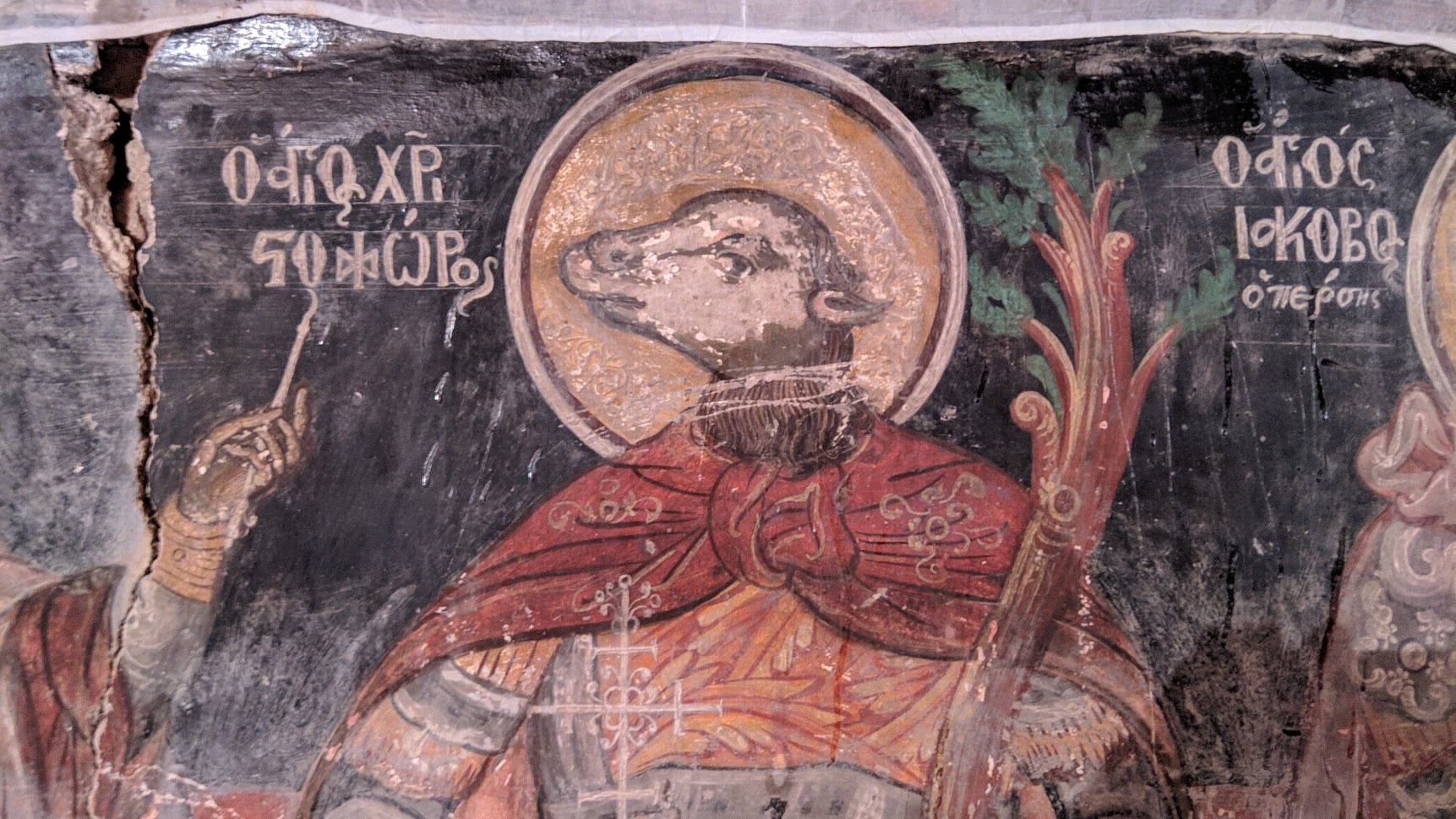
The fresco of Saint Christopher as Cynocephelus

The most characteristic thing about the monument that stands out is the mural, that of Saint Christopher which is presented with an animal-shaped head. Saint Christopher is sometimes represented as a Cynocephalus, with the head of a dog. There are only a very few in Greece. It is depicted with a long and sharp muzzle, a long mane on the neck and small sharp ears. Always in a standing position, in one hand he holds a rod and in the other the cross of Martyrdom. A similar representation of the Saint is exhibited in the Byzantine and Christian Museum of Athens.

== Old tombstones ==
Around the church there are burials with interesting tombstones from the 18th century, but also newer to modern. The old tombstones come from the Christian inhabitants during the occupation of the Ottoman Empire and the Bulgarians after.

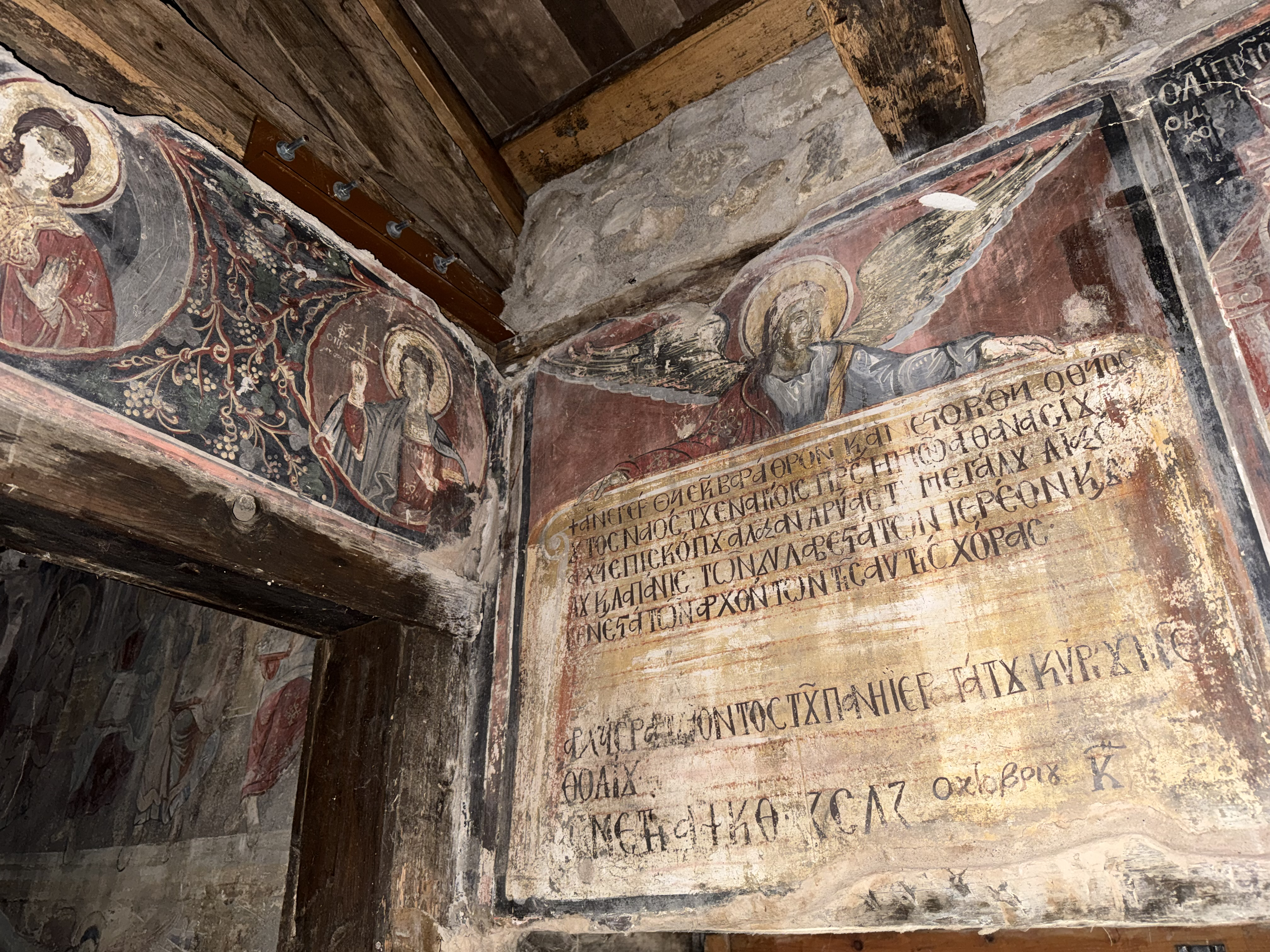
The inscription above the entrance of the Church
