= Lefteris Hapsiadis =

Lefteris Hapsiadis Λευτέρης Χαψιάδης
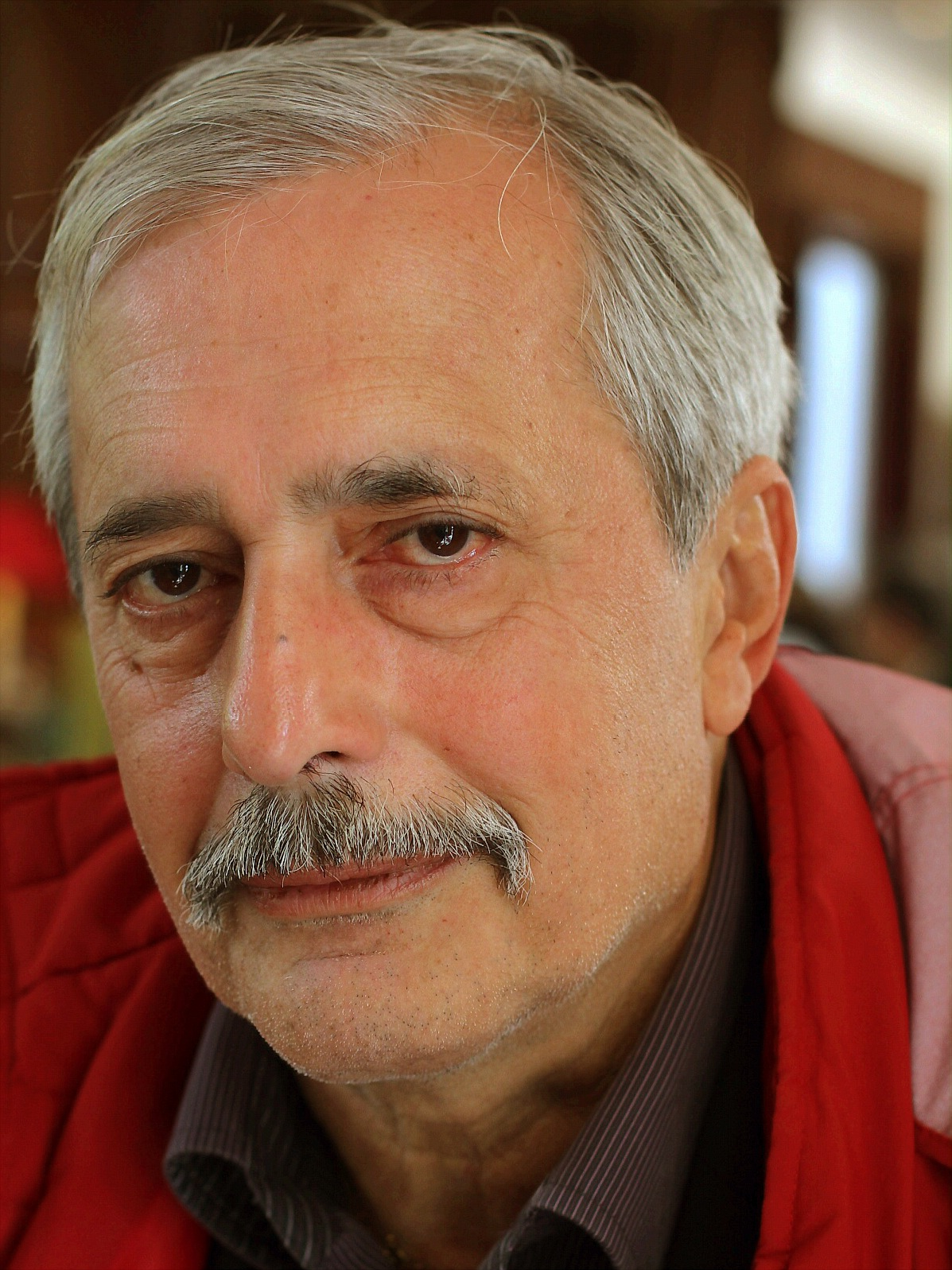

Background information
- Born: 23 October 1953; Feres, Greece
- Died: 2 October 2023 (aged 69) Alexandroupoli, Greece
- Genres: Laïka, Contemporary laïka, rebetiko, traditional pop
- Years active: 1983–2023

Lefteris Hapsiadis (Greek: Λευτέρης Χαψιάδης, 23 October 1953 – 2 October 2023) was a Greek contemporary songwriter, poet, and writer of novels.

His literary work included a plethora of poems, three novels, as well as lyrics for 525 songs (registered with AEPI) in the contemporary Greek rebetika, laïka (pop music) and elafra (light music) genres. He had collaborated with various music composers and had occasionally worked as a record producer. Among those, he had often worked with Christos Nikolopoulos with whom he had had a number of popular records (including Μία είναι η ουσία - One matter counts, and Κάποια, κάπου, κάποτε - Some woman, somewhere, sometime). Together they also created and produced a CD with 12 songs (December 1986), for which they were able to assemble 11 popular Greek performers, including Giorgos Dalaras, Haris Alexiou, Stratos Dionysiou, Giannis Parios, and Manolis Mitsias. Nikolopoulos performed one of the songs in the CD as well, his first public singing performance ever. The CD was launched as "Τραγούδια για τους φίλους μου" - Songs for my friends. Other quite well known performers of Hapsiadis pop songs were Stelios Kazantzidis, Glykeria and Manolis Aggelopoulos.

== Biography ==
Lefteris Hapsiadis was born in 1953 in Feres, and lived during his early life in Koila, both agglomerations located in the Greek Prefecture (Νομός) of Evros. This is the most north-eastern region of Greece, bordering on Turkey in the east, and Bulgaria in the north. Hapsiadis referred to Koila as his "Paradise on Earth", and he spent a major part of his life there. His family origin is from Pontos; this is the area in the north of present-day Turkey, along its Black Sea coast. Hapsiadis has been loyal to his Pontos origins and he has often collaborated in various artistic initiatives to preserve the cultural heritage of the land of his ancestors. An example includes the production of three CD records in the Pontos dialect, performed by Kazantzidis and Xrysanthos (an authentic Pontos singer), in the late eighties, early nineties. Hapsiadis was fairly knowledgeable of the Pontos Greek dialect that he learned from his parents and grandmother in Koila.

Hapsiadis attended high school in Alexandroupolis, the administrative capital of Evros. For this purpose his entire family moved to town from Koila. During that period his father owned a kiosk, typical of Greek city landscapes, selling printed press items, like newspapers, magazines, pocket books, postcards, etc. Working at the kiosk as well gave him the opportunity to read a lot and grow his appetite for the Greek lyrics of rebetika, a.k.a. the songs of manges, members of a sort of inner city and urban slums gangs in the early 20th century. When most of his age peers enjoyed pop and rock, Hapsiadis was discovering little known events and details surrounding rebetika songs, their performers and lyrics. He developed a habit of collecting rebetika lyrics and writing them down in a notebook as his favorite pastime. That helped him a lot in being accepted in the circles of key rebetika industry players, in later years.

For six months, he attended college classes in Patras, in the department of Biology before he dropped out and got entirely absorbed inside the professional world of rebetika in the Greek capital, Athens. He met Giorgos Dalaras, and through him he later came close to quite a few key actors in the Greek pop music industry. Names include Lefteris Papadopoulos, a widely known Greek lyrics writer, the composer Christos Nikolopoulos, and various popular Greek pop singers like Stelios Kazantzidis, Stratos Dyonisiou and Manolis Aggelopoulos. He also became close friends with Vassilis Vassilikos, a prominent novels writer. Vassilikos became internationally known by his "Z" novel, a story about the assassination of Grigoris Lambrakis, a left-wing political activist in the mid-1960s. That novel was later made into a movie as part of a trilogy by Greek Director Costa Gavras, with Yves Montand in the leading role. In his first novel, Hapsiadis devoted a chapter to a dramatic period of Vassilikos' life, right after the loss of his spouse Mimi, in Rome, Italy.

Lefteris Hapsiadis died on 2 October 2023, at the age of 69 from COVID-19 during the COVID-19 pandemic in Greece.

== Songs ==
Per the generally accepted public opinion his most popular song lyrics were Mia einai i ousia (Μια ειναι η ουσία, "One matter counts") that he wrote upon a Nikolopoulos music score during the mid-80s. The song was originally performed by Haris Alexiou and later, following accrued popularity, by quite a few other performers, including Giorgos Dalaras.

Μία είναι η ουσία:
δεν υπάρχει αθανασία
Αχ και του παράδεισου η κοιλάδα
δεν χωράει την Ελλάδα
Να 'σουνα, Θεέ μου, πότης
να σωθεί η ανθρωπότης,
στο μεθύσι σου απάνω
να μαχαίρωνες το Χάρο.
Άιντε ν' αρρωστήσει ο Άγιος-Πέτρος
να τη βγάλουμε και φέτος.

Translation:

There is one reality
There is no immortality
Oh, the valley of paradise
is not large enough for the whole of Greece
I wish, God, you were a drunk
to save the whole human race
During your drunkenness
to stab Charon to death
let's hope St-Peter gets sick
so that we'll make it for yet another year

The lyrics playfully deal with immortality, whereby the author admits that nothing is "immortal" and begs Almighty God to eliminate Death for good, after the former had a few drinks first. The lyrics are used in a passage in his second book, when the author dies and struggles to get into Paradise, but comes across a rather annoyed St-Peter, who didn't seem to have liked his "Mia einai i Ousia" song at all.

Another popular song of his, performed by Giorgos Dalaras, was Kappoia, kapou, kapote (Κάποια, κάπου, κάποτε).

Κάποια, κάπου, κάποτε ήταν η ζωή μου
η αρχή το τέλος μου κι όλη η ύπαρξή μου
Τώρα μες τα όνειρά μου ψάχνω τη μορφή της
μα και κείνη χάθηκε σαν την υπόσχεσή της
Κάποια, κάπου, κάποτε μου ‘χτιζε παλάτια
ήταν όμως γυάλινα κι έγιναν κομμάτια
Τώρα μες τα όνειρά μου ψάχνω τη μορφή της
μα και κείνη χάθηκε σαν την υπόσχεσή της

Translation:

Some woman somewhere, sometime was my whole life
My beginning, my end, and my whole existence
Now I am looking for her face in my dreams
but she disappeared just like her promises
Some woman somewhere, sometime was building castles for me
however, they were made of glass and broke in pieces
Now I am looking for her face in my dreams
but she disappeared just like her promises

Among his songs there are two referring to the Prefecture of Evros, the towns of Alexandroupolis and Orestiada, in the far north. It is generally known in Greece that the border regions of the country, especially Greece's eastern border with Turkey, are the least desirable areas for young Greeks to serve their country during their military service. In addition, until recent years, Greek conscripts were treated as second rank citizens in the towns and villages of Evros, as many among them would admit to this day. Unless they enjoyed a military rank of some sort, conscripts wouldn't be typically admitted inside many public venues, and many local businessmen would prefer to live without them entering their businesses. Hapsiadis was inspired by this to write two emotional songs, Alexandroupoli meria, originally performed by Dimitris Mitropanos, and Oresteiada, performed by Stelios Dionysiou and Ploutarchos.

=== Songs for my friends ===
(Tracks of the CD Τραγούδια για τους φίλους μου)
by Nikolopoulos and Hapsiadis, 1986

1. Μοιάζουμε (We resemble each other) with Manolis Mitsias
2. Αν τέλειωνε η ζωή (If life ended) with Stratos Dionysiou
3. Πως μπορεί (How is it possible) with Eleni Vitali
4. Ετσι σ'αγάπησα (I loved you this way) with Dionysis Theodosis
5. Φοβάμαι (I'm afraid) with Dimitra Galani
6. Κάποια, κάπου, κάποτε (Some woman, somewhere, some time) with Giorgos Dalaras
7. Καλύτερα ελεύθερος (Better be free) with Yannis Parios
8. Το διαβολάκι (Little devil) with Haris Alexiou
9. Τώρα που έφυγες (Now that you've gone away) with Litsa Diamanti
10. Οι δρόμοι τής ανατολής (The streets of the East) with Christos Nikolopoulos
11. Με χρώματα κι'αρώματα (With colors and odors) with Mary Vassou
12. Οταν χορεύεις μάτια μου (When you're dancing, my love) with Manolis Aggelopoulos

== Novels ==
In addition to poems and song lyrics Hapsiadis recently wrote three novels. He only lately decided to focus on writing novels and had his first three written after 2005, more than twenty years after he started writing lyrics. All of them are largely autobiographical with many details about events that actually took place and form part of the history of modern rebetika. His first two novels were "Η ζωη μου τραγούδι το τραγούδι ζωη" (My life (is) a song, the song (is) life) and "Ο αλήτης άγγελος" (An angel vagabond). In his second novel, although most of his writing describes real life events, locations and names of real persons, the author presents them as the building blocks of a "fiction" storyline. His third novel was presented to the public on 23 October 2010. It is called "13+1 Γιατί;" (Γιατί=why in Greek) completes a trilogy in which rebetiko holds a central role.

As a self-taught author, Hapsiadis creates unusual plots wherein key Greek music industry players participate as personages. In all his novels to-date his heroes maintain their real life names; however, in his second novel, Hapsiadis uses the name Lelos instead of his own given Christian name of Lefteris to represent himself as the leading actor. All three novels are written in simple everyday spoken Greek. He usually places verses inside the text, often for reasons of historic significance to the context he describes. All his novels expose events with actual historic data. He often offers his own insights in the evolution of rebetika from the times of Markos Vamvakaris and Vassilis Tsitsanis (pre- and post-World War II) to the present day. The events he addresses, many of which he himself witnessed as participant, are presented in quite a bit of detail. With a few scarce exceptions, Hapsiadis avoids criticism of his book personages, however, on occasions, he is being quite critical of himself and his own weaknesses.

== Honors ==
During his 25-year-long career as a lyrics writer, Hapsiadis achieved a number of Golden and Platinum record awards and occasionally he has been publicly recognized for his contribution to the Greek Popular Music by the Prefecture of Evros and Municipalities of Alexandroupolis and Feres with organized concerts dedicated to his song-lyrics successes.

== See also ==
- Mangas
- Rembetiko – a film by Costas Ferris
