= Alepochori, Evros =

Alepochori Αλεποχώρι
- Community
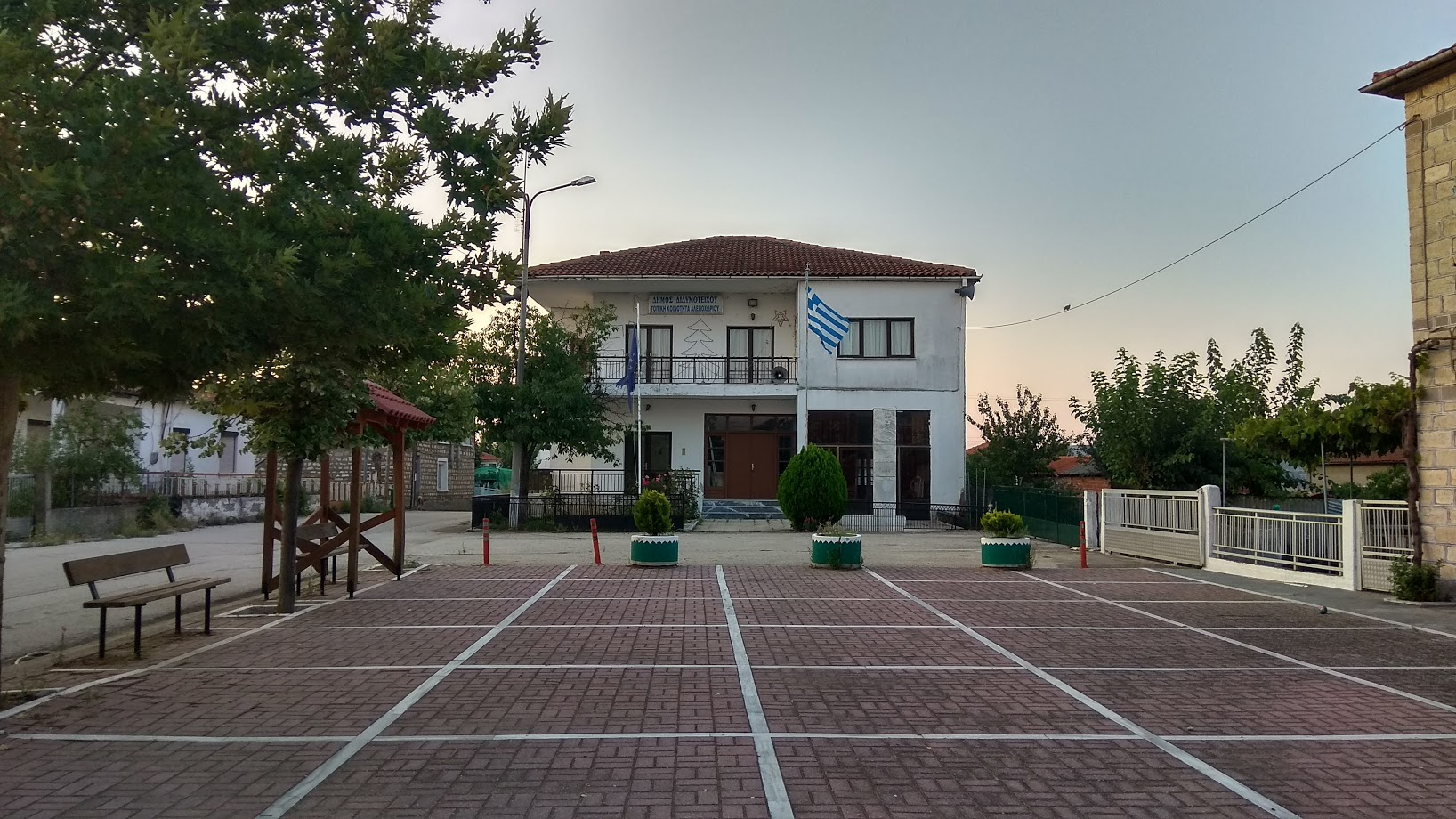
- The village square, with the Community building in the background.

- Location within Greece
- Coordinates: 41°27′08″N 26°12′29″E
- Country: Greece
- Administrative region: East Macedonia and Thrace
- Regional unit: Evros
- Municipality: Didymoteicho
- Municipal unit: Metaxades

Area
  - Community: 27.6 km^{2} (10.7 sq mi)
- Elevation: 70 m (230 ft)

Population (2021)
  - Community: 250
  - Density: 9.1/km^{2} (23/sq mi)
- Time zone: UTC+2 (EET)
  - Summer (DST): UTC+3 (EEST)
- Postal code: 68010

Alepochori is a village in the Evros regional unit, East Macedonia and Thrace, Greece. The village is considered very old and its inhabitants are native Greeks.

== Geographical data ==
The village is located right on the Greek–Bulgarian border (300 m from the last houses). The village was recognized as a community in 1929, coming from the community of Metaxades, while in 1956 the settlement of Polia was annexed to it. In 1997, the community was not recognized anymore and was annexed to the Municipality of Metaxades. Since 2010 and till today, it is a community of the Municipality of Didymoteicho.

== Name ==
Various legends are said that in the village there was a Turkish Aga who took the brides on the first night of their marriage, in his own house. The villagers slyly managed to send someone to the Constantinople to protest to the sultan, who acquitted them and fired Aga. Leaving the village, the Aga called the inhabitants "foxes" and so the village got its name.

== History ==
Alepochori is one of the first and oldest settlements of the region of Evros. Its first inhabitants numbered 300 and the houses 50. In short, it already existed in the Byzantine era but cholera caused the villagers to rebuild the village down the hill. A few years later, it was conquered by the Ottomans. In 1770 the village was set on fire and looted by the Turks because of a failed revolution attempt by the Greeks in Morea. But the residents of the surrounding villages helped to rebuild the village. It was liberated in 1920.

=== The village during the Byzantine Empire ===
From the historical testimonies that exist as well as from the tradition in the village it seems that Alepochori is one of the oldest villages in the area of Didymoteicho. Tradition has it that the village was very large with about 800 houses.

At the edge of the village near "tsisme" lived a monk all alone. The inhabitants preserved him by offering him food. At that time there was a big bazaar in the place "Gialadarki". There was a big fountain there. The water came with "kiougia" from the area of today's chapel of Agia Paraskevi. The kiosks were found with recent excavations. One day a woman from the village did not get food to the monk. Then he cursed her and with her the whole village. After a couple of days, the residents were hit by cholera and many people died. Most are buried in the "Ampelia" where cemeteries are still preserved. Many residents left and only seven families remained. Gradually, however, the village grew again. Two cobbled streets survive to this day and led to the old church and to the "tsisme".

=== The village during the Ottoman Empire ===
During the Turkish occupation, the village was called: "Bas Kara Bunar" which means "Black Deep Well". According to the elders, the water of the wells that existed was black and bitter. Outside the Christian-inhabited village, which was very large because tiles, stones and kiosks for water (which testify to its size) were constantly being discovered, and about a kilometer away there was a Turkish village where Bey was staying with his guard, among other Turks. The Turkish village was exactly where the border line that separates the village from Bulgaria is today. The old village that was at the crossroads, from Ortakioi to Didymoteicho.

The oppression by the Turks had been on a daily basis, with all the known consequences (devşirme, confiscation of goods, taxes, etc.). One of the worst troubles of the inhabitants by the Turks was that: In the old days the bride who would get married on Sunday night was taken by a Turk. He kept her for three days and then gave her to the groom. This fact had become the fear and terror and the most humiliating act of any young couple getting married. The bride was going through hours of mass rape and humiliation of her personality. This lasted for many years. At some point, however, the young people of the village could not stand any more.

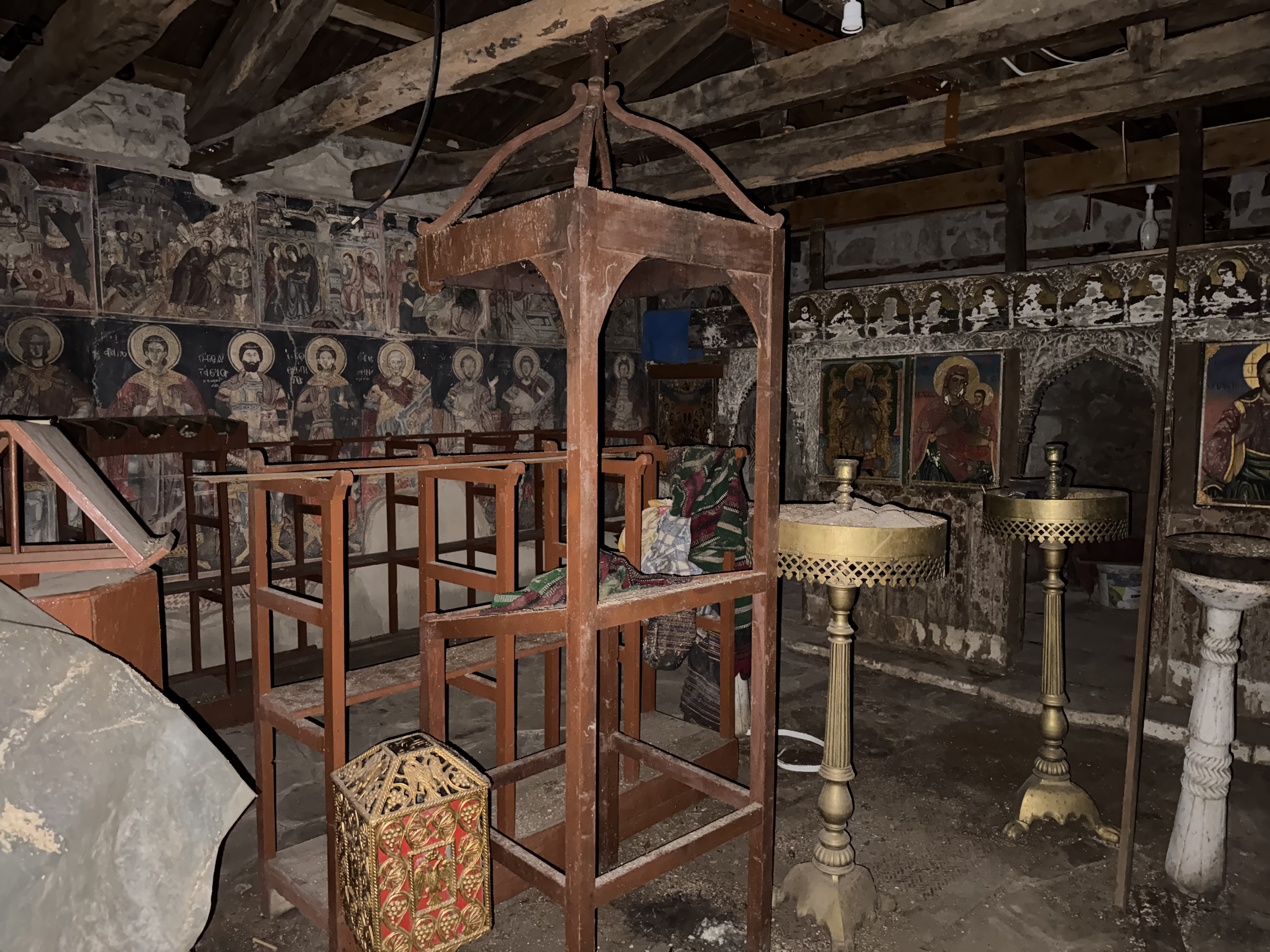
The Post-Byzantine Church of Saint Athanasius, built in 1729, was constructed secretly underground to protect it from Ottoman authorities.

A committee of three young men agreed and decided to start from the village and reach Constantinople, where the sultan's headquarters were located. Through the Turkish outposts and villages entering Eastern Thrace after many days they arrived in Constantinople. On the day they arrived in Constantinople, tradition says, there was an event attended by the sultan. The edges of the road were full of people. They went to an "Armeni" (According to the Greek vernacular, Armenedes were the traders and craftsmen scattered from their cradle, within the Ottoman Empire) in Constantinople and asked for help on what to do to get rid of this habit. The "Armenis" advised them to take a brazier with burning coals, and to put them on their heads and turn around. "The sultan will call you and you will talk to him," he told them. Indeed, the sultan called them and asked them why they had the braziers on their heads. They said to him, "My king, as the fire burns in the brazier, so our head burns." And they told him what was going on and what they were going through.

The Sultan then became enraged and ordered a Turkish officer with a strong guard to visit the village and if what was told to him really happened to punish them. At the time when the young people were getting ready to leave, after thanking him, he asked them to answer his question, how they managed to reach the City, without being noticed by the Turkish guards. They told him that they had come with many precautions, hiding and misleading the soldiers in various sly ways. Then the sultan called them "tilkiler" (foxes) and since then the village has been given the Turkish name: "Tilkikkoy".

When the young men returned to the village, they told the villagers everything and waited for the arrival of the Turkish officer with his guard to investigate the matter. He came disguised as a tobacco merchant and told them that "we in our villages do this and that to the Greeks". They were discouraged and told him they were doing even worse things to the Greeks. The representative returned to Edirne and reported to the sultan everything that was going on. The sultan sent an army and burned the whole village of Gunekli. There were no Turks left. Only the Greeks who built Alepochori (Tilkikkoy) remained, that is, a village of the wicked (tilki = fox). Only one Turk survived the massacre and he started the village of Avdella.

There are two other versions. One states that two elderly Turks managed to escape. "Aksakal" which means "white generation" and "Abdullah". They left and founded the villages of "Aksakal" (Polia) and "Abdoula" (Avdella), respectively. However, there is another version. That the Turkish government had settled refugees in the Didymoteicho area from the East and Pakistan (the so-called Matzirides), who founded Turkish villages such as Kiani (Tsiausli), Savra (Subaskioi), Avdoulaki (today's Avdella) Elafochori, Polia and others.

So for many years the village was called "Tilkikkoy" and after the liberation it took the Greek name "Alepochori". There is also the second version that it got its name from the many foxes that existed in the area, but the strongest one is the first that has been transmitted by word of mouth for many years. In historical records, specifically in the year 1910, there is also the name "Kaylıklıköy", however it seems to have been a temporary name. During the Turkish occupation, everything was covered by terror and by slavery. Slavery in the village lasted for many years. It was conquered by the Turks around 1350 when Edirne was conquered.

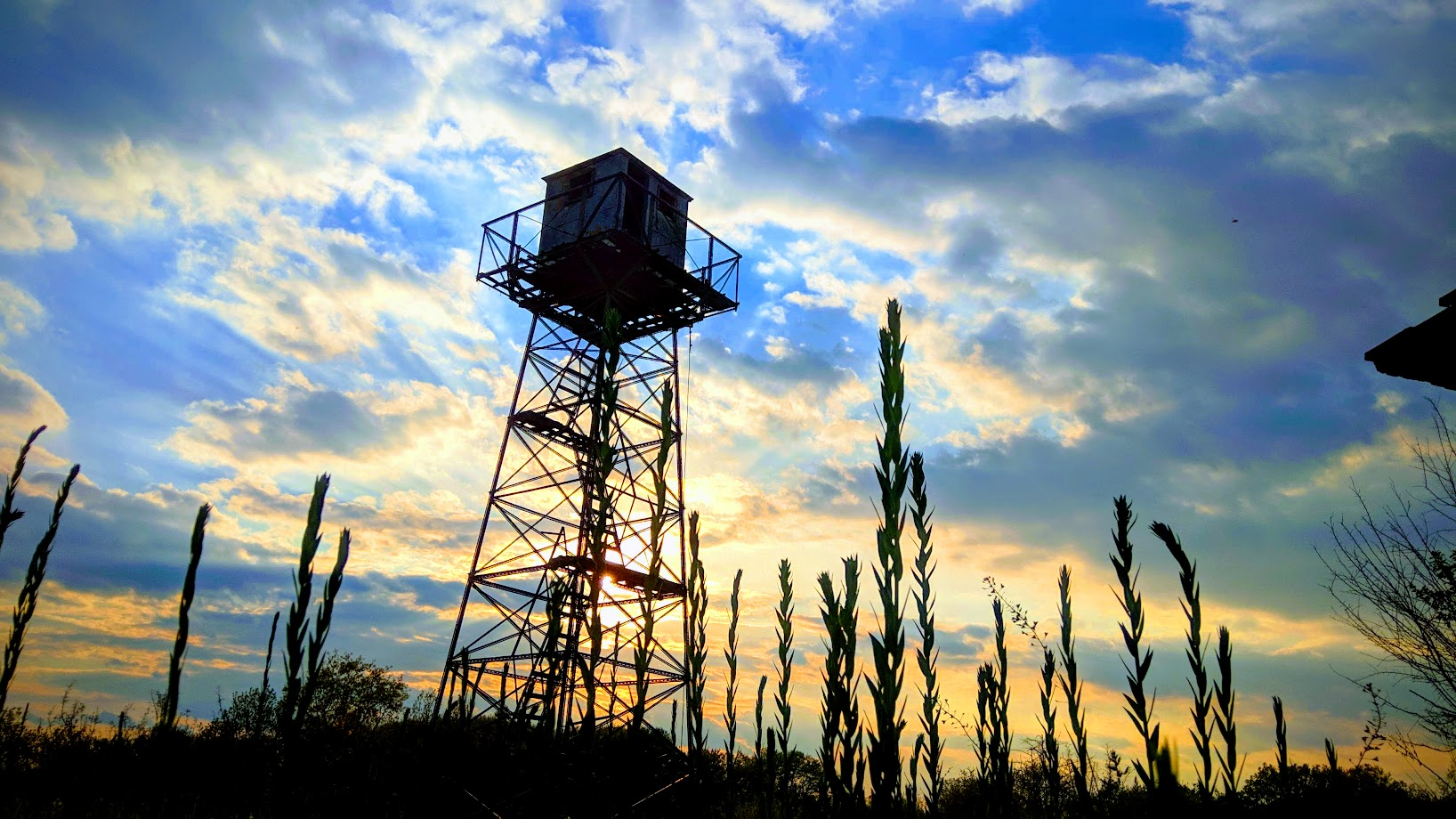
The village’s primary military outpost, situated right next to the Greek-Bulgarian border, was operational until the fall of communist Bulgaria and is now left abandoned.

=== More recent history of the village ===
Since the 18th century the urban Greek element has been booming economically and spiritually, which can be strongly found in the life of the society and in ecclesiastical architecture and art. In 1893 the school of the village operated for the first time. Later the village was conquered by the Bulgarians.

On 18 March 1914, 15 captives from Belopolyane were slaughtered by the Turks in the village of Alepochori. They took the captives from Akalan (now Belopolyane) to a ravine near the village of Alepochori, where the barbarians' work began. They were slaughtered one by one just like in the slaughterhouse. In front of others. Moments of terror, full of sadness and barbarism. Blood flowed from the hands of the executors, the people continued to be slaughtered even then, as if by a miracle, they shouted loudly to the living "leave!". Just when the 16th was about to be slaughtered, then everyone was scattered in the forest.

In 1920, after the liberation of Thrace, it began to take its modern form. For example, in mid-June 1920, 5–6 Bulgarians and 17 komitatzids attempted to attack the village, from which they stole 64 sheep and goats, 7 cows, 5 oxen and a donkey, while at the same time they brutally abused some residents of the village. In 1922, after the Asia Minor catastrophe, many refugee families came (168 people or 22 families). They built their houses and were given lands for cultivation, from the area. Today, there are only a few refugees in the village. Most have left for Thessaloniki and Athens. The Italian and German occupation left its mark on the village.

Several young men from the village fought in the mountains of Albania in the 1940 war as they did in the Asia Minor catastrophe. A resident of the village, 13 years old at the time, vividly described the day of 28 October 1940: "That day the village was buzzing. The doors and windows were opening and closing banging. People were running in the streets, in the fields, in the pastures, the bell was ringing to alert the villagers about the bad news of the war. There was a general mobilization. They took the classes, recruited horses, cows, sheep, goats for the army, for the front."

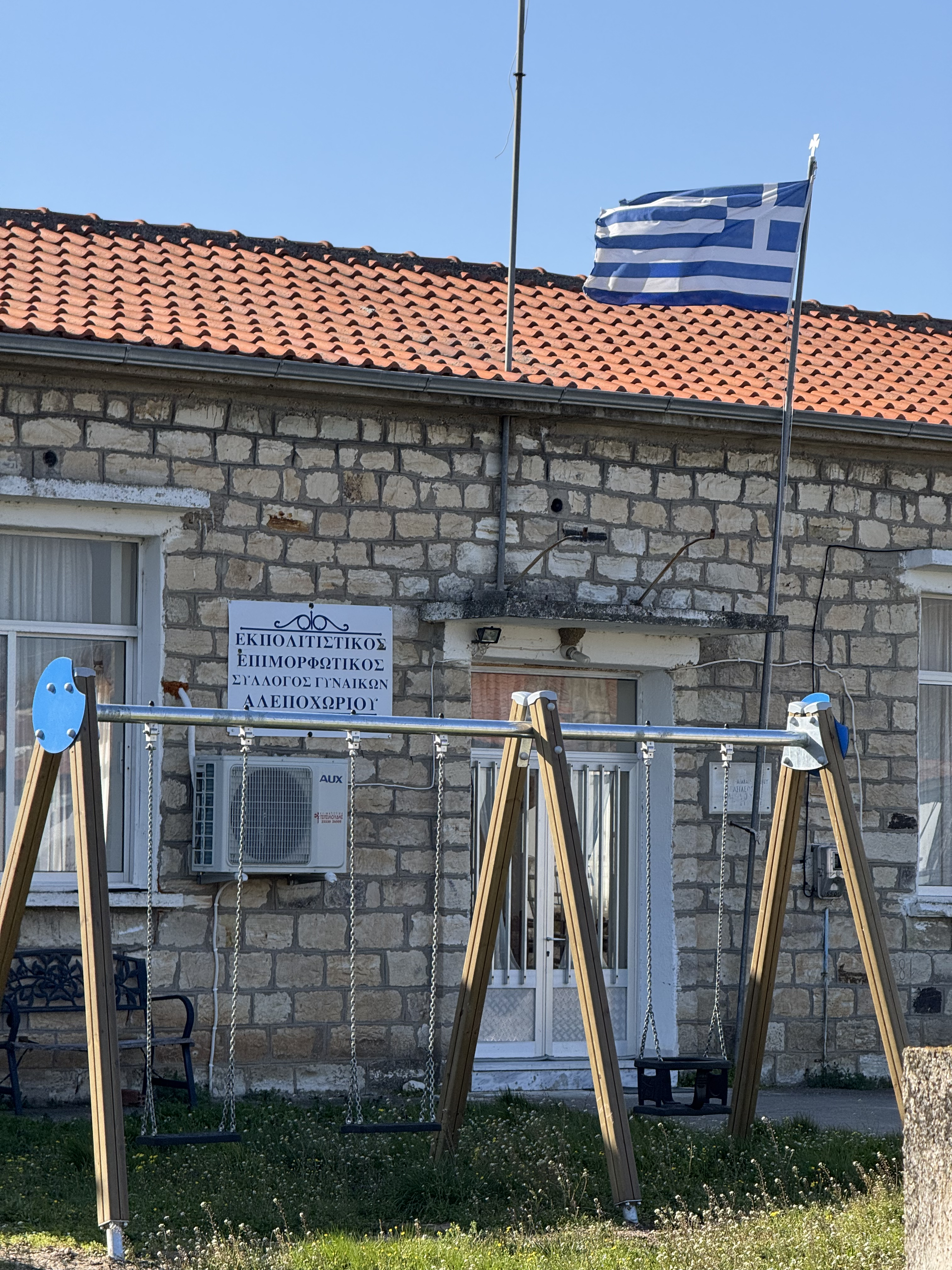
The old school of Alepochori in Evros was built in 1951, funded by a royal fundraising drive initiated by King Paul of Greece. The six-classroom school was abandoned in the late 20th century. In 2009, the building was repurposed to house the Women’s Cultural and Educational Association of Alepochori, which relocated there from its former premises.

The main occupations of the inhabitants around 1940 were agriculture and animal husbandry, with wheat, barley, corn and sesame as the main crops. Today, the same crops continue and canary and bean cultivation was added in 1952.

The community was governed by temporary public workers and there was compulsory participation of men in community projects from the age of 18–20 years, with women not participating. Men and women shared farm and livestock work, with children starting to help from the age of 12–13 years.

The family structure was multi-member and traditional, with the first-born children taking the names of the husband's parents and the subsequent children taking the names of the wife's parents. Marriages were age-based and couples usually stayed at the groom's father's home. The dowry consisted mainly of land, while the inheritance was passed by will, usually after the death of the father, with girls receiving a smaller share than boys.

The village suffered greatly during the 1946–1949 civil war because it was next to Bulgaria. It became the scene of many conflicts in the civil conflict. Many times it was evacuated, it had several victims in the civil war. On 17 June 1947, a group of guerrillas entered Alepochori and burned down the house of a field guard, while he reportedly recruited 35 like-minded people. At the same time, the group was followed by 15 families of the village adjacent to the Communist Party of Greece. But 7 of the alleged deportees returned to the village. They, fearing the possibility of their violent recruitment, had gone into hiding. Shortly after Christmas, a large group of rebels stormed northern Alepochori, near the Bulgarian border, and took food, loaded onto oxcarts and transported it to the G'okche Bunar site, near the border with Bulgaria. On 15 May 1949, the surrounding area of Metaxades was occupied by the guerrillas and so the inhabitants of the villages of Paliouri, Polia, Avdella and Alepochori had settled in Metaxades. After the civil war, the villagers tried to rebuild the village and succeeded. The existing borders were set after the conditions of the Greek state with Bulgaria–Turkey. The former Alepochori community consists of about 25,000 Acres, of which 12,000 are arable and the rest are Forests. With struggles by residents, much of the public space changed status and became community. Two major reforestations took place in 1960 and 1990. Many residents have contracts to buy land from Turkish chifliks.

In the 1960s, several residents immigrated inside the country (Athens–Thessaloniki) and two other countries (Germany, Belgium, America, Australia etc.).

On 5 February 2006 the ET3 show "Kiriaki sto Chorio" or "Sunday in the Village" came to the village and an episode was filmed where local traditions, customs and local food were presented nationwide and internationally, through ET3 and ERT World. The episode featured traditional dances and was attended by various associations in the area.

On 12 January 2021 with the general floods in the Prefecture of Evros in 2021, the river Erythropotamos overflowed and caused serious damage to fields, machinery and houses in the surrounding area, as the dams of the river broke.

== Historical monuments ==
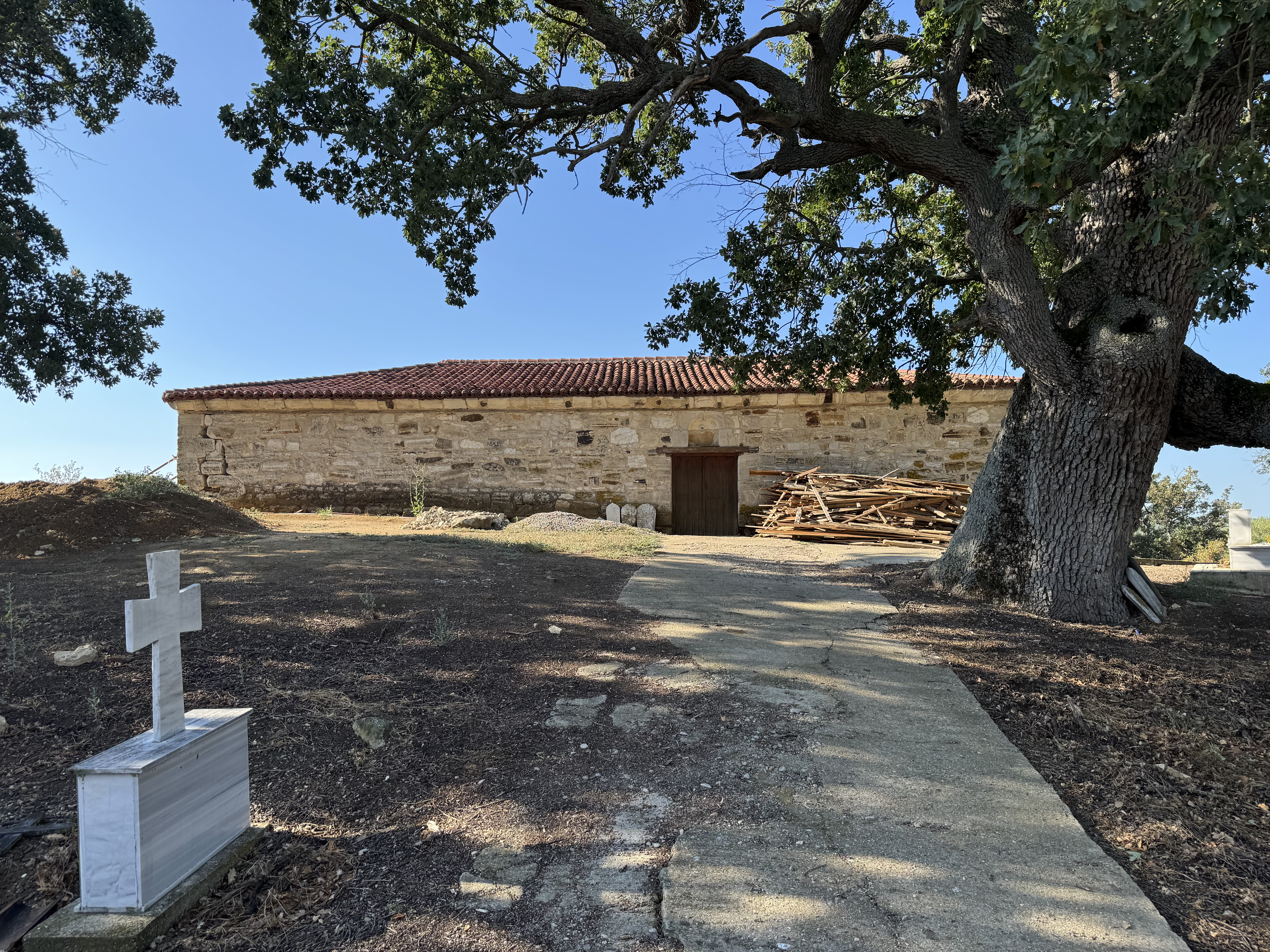
The Post-Byzantine Church of Saint Athanasius, built in 1729. Located in the village's cemetery.

=== Post-Byzantine church of Saint Athanasius ===
The oldest church in the village is the Post-Byzantine church of Saint Athanasius. It was built in 1729 without windows and a bell tower, but with rare beauty murals. It is also characteristic that in the gynaeconite, which is located at the back of the church and was separated from the main church by a lattice, there are representations of "crimes", of punishment, that is, of sinners in the second presence.

Of interest are the many tombstones in the area around the church, as well as the representation of the tree of life at the entrance of the cemetery. Humble in appearance and height and registered in part in the earth, so as not to provoke the Ottomans. They say it was the "secret school" of the area and the time it was built. It is decorated with frescoes and a wood-carved iconostasis of the same era. It also impresses with an extremely rare representation of an animal-shaped St. John's wort. This is Saint Christopher who is presented as a man with a dog's head. A similar representation of the Saint is exhibited in the Byzantine and Christian Museum of Athens. It is made of limestone, is single-aisled and without columns. It has two entrances: one on the north side, while the main entrance is on the west side. The west side door was for women and the north door was for men. Folklorist Georgios Megas analyzes the reasons that justify the architectural choices in the buildings of this period, saying that the shape of the churches is a result of the fear not to provoke the Ottomans, as they often fell victim to janissaries and delibasis who looted area of Thrace. He describes, in a brilliant style, the fact that Thrace is the courtyard of the Capital, in which the above were inflicted, causing damage and spreading terror.

== Occupations of the inhabitants ==
The main occupations of the inhabitants from the very old years were agriculture and animal husbandry.

Agriculture: The area was wheat-producing. Plowing was done with oxen and a plow. The farmer had on his shoulder the tray with the seed, sowed and then swarmed with the wooden swarm. The harvesting was done with the scythe and after the thymes were done, the threshing was followed by the "dukana" (wooden object with sharp stones, later with the "batosa" (machine that worked with the help of a tractor) and finally with the harvesters. There was a watermill in the village next to Erythropotamos and there the residents made their flour and the food for the Animals. Today agriculture has changed form. After the two great reforestations that took place, modern machines are used to cultivate the land and crops have also changed (cotton, sunflowers, beets, corn, potatoes).

Livestock farming: There used to be a lot of animals in the village. In this there were and still are large and rich Pastures. Each house had cows, oxen, buffaloes, sheep, goats, pigs, and hens. Today, livestock is almost non-existent. Cows are few and far between, the donkey is an endangered species. Also, the flocks of sheep and Goats were left with little.

Silkworm: For several years, the inhabitants were engaged in silkworms. But as soon as the mulberries were uprooted from the Erythropotamos valley, this activity stopped. The "hoods" were grown in the cairns of the houses and sold to the Merchants in Didymoteicho and Soufli. So they had an income for the finances of the house.

Vineyard: The vineyard existed and still exists today. The vineyards are located on the NE side of the village, on a slope and beautify the area. Alepochori is famous for its wine and tsipouro.

Loom: The main occupations of the women were the loom (cotton, wool, hair polishing, grinding, browning, painting, weaving). A kind of weavers were both "kourelou" and "karamilota".

Hunting: In Alepochori there are large hunting grounds. In Byzantine times, emperors came to hunt when they visited Didymoteicho. Today there is a lot of hunting (hares, foxes, wolves, wild boars, deer, wild ducks and others) and famous hunters.

In the old village there was "Albano". It was the place where "Albanis" cleaned the soles of the feet of large animals (oxen, cows, horses) and covered them (he placed them on horseshoes).

The refugees had brought their own arts. They made "paddles", "scaffolding", "signs" and various tools for the cart. Later the blacksmiths appeared.

== Life of the inhabitants ==
Studying the Byzantine History, we see that the way of life of the inhabitants of Alepochori is almost the same as the way of life of the Byzantines. After all, that makes sense, because the village geographically and historically existed during this period.

Time was divided into two major periods. From 23 April, St. George's Day until 26 October, St. Dimitris' Day. The first was "summer time" while the second was "winter time".

Throughout the summer, the inhabitants were engaged in work in the fields (spring sowing, orchards, corn, cotton).

All the fields resounded with songs and joys as they always did the work with song. Carving, reaping, threshing, straw was later one of their main occupations.

On Easter days and generally all holidays, they attended church regularly. They wore their festive clothes and many met after a long time in the churches. Despite their fatigue, on the afternoons of the big holidays, everyone gathered in the village square and danced and sang in groups. It was usually the place where young people met.

The festival, which used to be celebrated on "May 2", in Agios Athanasios, was considered a big celebration. Later, after the construction of the new church, the festival was celebrated and is still celebrated today on "August 23" (nine days of the Virgin Mary).

On the eve, all the friends from the neighboring villages were waiting. They always cooked meat (mainly sheep) and the next day in the village square, they were constantly partying. They also shopped from the "shopkeepers" who came to the village. In September and October, a big festival was held in the vineyards where the "harvest" took place. There was no house that did not have a vineyard and did not make its own wine.

"Ai Dimitr", and the "winter season" begins. The animals were locked up in the houses. They paid the cowherd, "Doumouchtis" and the other shepherds, while even that day they had a lot of fun. Every household in Agios Dimitrios slaughtered a large rooster.

From there, winter preparations began. The men were engaged plowing, sowing, cutting wood for the fireplace, while the women made preparations for the winter (loom, frumenty, rousnitsia, groats, couscous, pickles).

In the winter, the nights were of great value. They gathered every night in a house and there they did various jobs (knitting, embroidery, wool), they sang and told fairytales. The storytellers were sought after by both children and adults.

The rest of the winter was pleasant and the big celebrations then continued on carnival. In all the houses there was a stone that wrote the name of the householder and the date of construction of the house, a characteristic of the Byzantines.

They believed a lot in legends, traditions, manners, customs, beliefs, prejudices and ghosts. When they got sick they had to go through a foreign field. In order not to cry, the small children went through "wedges". There was someone in the village who was healing the "saralik" (yellowness). He cut the lower part of his tongue and did not let the patient sleep for three days. They believed a lot in the "stio" (ghost). In an elm, in the place "gialadarki", the "stio" appeared late at night. They believed in the "uramades", that is, that they peed on the part of the devil and had to be healed. Doctors and herbs replaced the doctors who did not exist.

== Categories of houses in the village ==
The main feature of the house of Alepochori is the "two-story stone" house. If we look at the houses in the village that exist until today, we will divide them into four categories:

=== The old stone house ===
Two-story house built of stone from the quarries of Metaxades. At the bottom of the house there was a small hallway, a room next to which there was the warehouse and on the opposite side the barn. The inner staircase led to the upper floor where there was the "haiati" (large living room) and two other rooms and at the back there was the "samalouka" (barn). These houses were built by craftsmen of the village who carved the stone. Each stone was glued to the other with mud (soil and straw). Between the stones they placed thick wood to tie the house and make it earthquake-proof. The floor upstairs was Wooden. The windows, doors are all wooden, with oak wood from the forest of the village. Apart from the craftsmen, almost the whole village helped with the construction. In the foundations, a rooster was always slaughtered, and when they reached the roof, the master builder made a wreath of flowers and shouted a wish for all those who brought a gift. The interiors were designed to serve all needs (sleep, storage, cocoons, Animals, engagements, weddings).

The refugee house

In 1922, after the Asia Minor catastrophe, the refugees who came to the village built their own neighborhood with their own architecture. Their houses were smaller and built with "birch" (mud with straw, dried in the sun and made like stone). From the outside, they were smeared with mud (soil, manure) so that they would not get corroded by the rain.

The newer house

After 1950 the houses retained the architecture of those before, but with a revised layout and cement being used instead of wood inside the wall. Examples of such houses are often preserved in the village today.

The modern house

In recent years, the houses being built are made of Bricks with modern designs and all the comforts. Each house was built on a large plot of land. The plot used to be blocked by dry grass. In the yard there was the oven that needed a lot of work and art to build. Outside the yard was the toilet, made of wood. At one end were the woods for winter and summer. In the yard there was also the "kmasi" (place for the pig). If there were sheep or Goats, there was the "mantri-saia". The Animals that were in the stable were the oxen for plowing, the cows, the buffalo, the donkeys and in the yard they surrounded the dog, the cat, the hens, the ducks, the little pigs.

== Around the village ==
=== Chapel of Saint Paraskevi ===
The Greek Orthodox chapel of Saint Paraskevi is less than 1 km from the last houses of the eastern side of the village. It was built in 1954 as a very small chapel (where only one person could fit) and was then extended 2 times. People go there to barbecue, to picnic or to relax under the cool shades of the trees and the sound of a nearby water source.

=== The old outpost (Hellenic Outpost 48) ===
The old outpost of the village was probably built around the 60s. It's located a few meters from the Greek-Bulgarian border. Today it doesn't function as anything.

=== Erythropotamos river ===
The river of Erythropotamos is located around 1 km from the southern end part of the village. The source of the river is in the eastern Rhodope Mountains and ends into the Evros river. During the winter it's dangerous because of very high water levels and during the summer it's usually dry.

=== Fishing pond of Alepochori ===
The fishing pond is located approximately 4 km west from the village. It's a dam supposed to protect the surrounding area from floods. It is forbidden to swim in there and it's very dangerous to try because of the sand under the water and the possible snakes.

== Population censuses ==
The population grew rapidly until 1940. In the 1940s, due to war, occupation and civil war, it declined. There was an increase in the 1950s to the 1960s, but it began to decline dramatically but slowly from the 1960s onwards. In 2020 it is believed that the population of the village was probably around 100 to 120 inhabitants.

Year	Alepochori	Local Community
1920	351	–
1928	489	–
1940	651	–
1951	399	–
1961	549	876 (In 1956 the village of Polia was annexed)
1971	502	840
1981	464	696
1991	427	609
2001	308	474
2011	237	365
2021	157	250
