= Tychero railway station =

Railway station in Greece

Τυχερό Tychero

General information
- Location: Tychero; Evros; Greece
- Coordinates: 40°53′28″N 26°11′05″E
- Owner: GAIAOSE
- Line: Alexandroupoli–Svilengrad railway
- Platforms: 3 (1 disused)
- Tracks: 3 (1 disused)
- Train operators: Hellenic Train

Construction
- Structure type: at-grade
- Platform levels: 1
- Parking: No
- Cycle facilities: No

Other information
- Status: Unstaffed

History
- Opened: 1872
- Electrified: No
- Former names: Bıdıklı, Tychio (pre-1953)

Services
Preceding station	Hellenic Train	Following station
Peplos towards Alexandroupoli	G6 Alexandroupoli-Ormenio	Filakto towards Ormenio
Location
- Location within Greece

Tychero railway station (Greek: Σιδηροδρομικός Σταθμός Τυχερό, romanized: Sidirodromikós stathmós Tychero) is a railway station that serves the town of Tychero, Evros in Eastern Macedonia and Thrace, Greece. Located 1.1 kilometres (0.68 mi) northeast of the town centre, the station opened in 1872 by the Chemins de fer Orientaux, (now part of OSE). Today TrainOSE operates just 4 daily Regional trains to Alexandroupoli and Ormenio. The station is unstaffed however there are waiting rooms available, if open.

== History ==
The station was opened in June 1872 when the line from Alexandroupoli (then Dedeagac) to Istanbul (then Constantinople) via Edirne was completed. Tychero (Ottoman: Bıdıklı) was one of the stations on this line. Until 1909 there was no connection between the lines Istanbul–Alexandroupoli and Thessaloniki–Alexandroupoli (opened in 1896) at Alexandroupoli; A connection existed between Feres and Potamos (near current Avas). When the railway was built it was all within the Ottoman Empire. After World War I and the subsequent Greek-Turkish War from 1919 to 1922, and finally peace in the form of the Lausanne treaty, the Chemins de fer Orientaux (CO) ended up having a network straddling Turkey and Greece, Didymoteicho became part of Greece and the line administrated by Greece.

In 1920 the Line and station became part Hellenic State Railways. Through the 1950s-70s, the station would see between 300 and 350 tons of the famed "Golden Head" Tychero melons leave via rail.

In late 1970 the Hellenic State Railways was reorganised. On 31 December 1970, Hellenic State Railways ceased to exist; the following day, all railways in Greece (with the exception of private industrial lines and E.I.S.) were transferred to Hellenic Railways Organisation S.A., a state-owned corporation, responsible for most for Greece's rail infrastructure and passenger services.

In the 1990s, OSE introduced the InterCity service to the Alexandroupoli–Svilengrad line Which reduced travel times across the whole line.

In 2009, with the Greek debt crisis unfolding OSE's Management was forced to reduce services across the network. Timetables were cut back, and routes closed as the government-run entity attempted to reduce overheads. Services from Orestiada to Alexandroupoli were cut back to three trains a day, reducing the reliability of services and passenger numbers. On 13 February 2011, all international services were suspended due to the Greek financial crisis and subsequent budget cuts by the Greek government. As a result, all cross-border routes were closed, and international services (to Istanbul, Sofia, etc.) ended. Thus, only two routes now connect Didymoteicho with Thessaloniki and Athens (and those with a connection to Alex / Polis), while route time increased as the network was "upgraded".

In 2009, with the Greek debt crisis unfolding OSE's Management was forced to reduce services across the network. Timetables were cut back, and routes closed as the government-run entity attempted to reduce overheads. Services from Feres to Alexandroupoli were cut back to three trains a day, reducing the reliability of services and passenger numbers. With passenger footfall in sharp decline. On 11 February 2011, all cross-border routes were closed, and international services (to Istanbul, Sofia, etc.) were ended. Thus, only two routes now connect Feres with Thessaloniki and Athens (and those with a connection to Alex / Polis), while route time increased as the network was "upgraded". Services to/from Ormenio were replaced by bus. In 2014 TrainOSE replaced services to/from Dikaia with buses In September 2014 a rail replacement bus was implemented across the line so that priority could be given for the transportation of the seasons suger beets crop.

In 2017 OSE's passenger transport sector was privatised as TrainOSE, currently a wholly owned subsidiary of Ferrovie dello Stato Italiane infrastructure, including stations, remained under the control of OSE. In 2020 a 25 year old refugee was struck and killed by a train outside of Tychero railway station while following the tracks south. In July 2022, the station began being served by Hellenic Train, the rebranded TrainOSE.

Following the Tempi crash, Hellenic Train announced rail replacement bus's on certain routes across the Greek rail network, starting Wednesday 15 March 2023.

In August 2025, the Greek Ministry of Infrastructure and Transport confirmed the creation of a new body, Greek Railways (Greek: Σιδηρόδρομοι Ελλάδος, romanized: Ellinikí Sidiródromi Monoprósopi) to assume responsibility for rail infrastructure, planning, modernisation projects, and rolling stock across Greece. Previously, these functions were divided among several state-owned entities: OSE, which managed infrastructure; ERGOSÉ, responsible for modernisation projects; and GAIAOSÉ, which owned stations, buildings, and rolling stock. OSE had overseen both infrastructure and operations until its vertical separation in 2005. Rail safety has been identified as a key priority. The merger follows the July approval of a Parliamentary Bill to restructure the national railway system, a direct response to the Tempi accident of February 2023, in which 43 people died after a head-on collision.

== Facilities ==
The station buildings original 19th century buildings have recently been repaired and restored (with help from EU funding). however the waiting rooms are (as of 2020) closed, as is the booking office. As a result, the station is currently unstaffed halt.

== Services ==
As of 2020, the station is only served by one daily pair of regional trains Alexandroupoli–Ormenio. There is also a bus stop at the station.

As of October 2024 all services are run as a rail-replacement bus service.
