= Feres railway station =

Railway station in Greece

Φέρες Feres

General information
- Location: Feres; Evros; Greece
- Coordinates: 40°53′28″N 26°11′05″E
- Owner: Greek Railways
- Manager: Greek Railways
- Line: Alexandroupolis–Svilengrad railway
- Platforms: 2
- Tracks: 4 (2 disused)
- Train operators: Hellenic Train
- Bus routes: Alexandroupoli Port, Dikaia
- Connections: Bus

Construction
- Structure type: at-grade
- Platform levels: 1
- Parking: Yes (limited)
- Cycle facilities: Yes

Other information
- Status: Unstaffed
- Website: Official website

History
- Opened: 1896?
- Electrified: No
- Former names: Ferecik

Services
Preceding station	Hellenic Train	Following station
Alexandroupoli Terminus	G6 Alexandroupoli-Ormenio	Peplos towards Ormenio
Location
- Location within Greece

Feres railway station (Greek: Σιδηροδρομικός Σταθμός Φερών, romanized: Sidirodromikós stathmós Ferón) is a railway station that serves the town of Feres, Evros in Eastern Macedonia and Thrace, Greece. Located 1.4 kilometres (0.87 mi) west of the town centre, the station opened in 1896 by the Chemins de fer Orientaux, (now part of OSE). Today Hellenic Train operates just 4 daily Regional trains to Alexandroupoli and Ormenio. The station is unstaffed however there are waiting rooms available, if open. Feres is the first stop after Alexandroupolis, as the railway heads north.

== History ==
The station was opened in 1874 as Feretzik two years after the line from Alexandroupoli (then Dedeagac) to Istanbul via Edirne was completed. Built by the Union Railway Company (The Compagnie du Chemin de Fer Ottoman Jonction Salonique-Constantinople (JSC), from Constantinople to Vienna. The railway reached Feres in 1873, when the line from Constantinople to Edirne and Bulgaria was opened.

It was the terminus and the point where it was connected to the Edirne – Dedeagats network of the Eastern Railway Company (Chemins de fer οrientaux — CO ), which also had the privilege of operating the ports of Alexandroupolis and Thessaloniki.

Until 1909 there was no connection between the lines Istanbul–Alexandroupoli and Thessaloniki–Alexandroupoli (opened in 1896) at Alexandroupoli; a connection existed between Feres and Potamos (near current Avas), which obligated passenger's to pay a toll.

During World War I the railway was an important link as the Ottoman Empire, Bulgaria, and Austria-Hungary were all Central Allies. Following the defeat of the Ottoman Empire, its remaining imperial possessions were divided. The sections from Alexandroupoli to Svilengrad, except for a short section of about 10 kilometres (6.2 mi) in Turkey serving Edirne Karaagaç station and for 3 kilometres (1.9 mi) between the Greek border and Svilengrad station in Bulgaria come under the control of the French-Hellenic Railway Company (CFFH), a subsidiary of the CO, when the CFFH was incorporated in July 1929.

In 1920, as a result of the Treaty of Neuilly, the town was given to Greece. The Treaty of Lausanne of 1923, a new border between Greece and Turkey was established at the Evros river, just east of Ftelia railway station, which had the result that the railway from Istanbul to Bulgaria entered Greece at Pythio, then re-entered Turkey at Edirne (Karaağaç railway station), re-entered Greece at Marasia, and finally entered Bulgaria between Ormenio and Svilengrad. This arrangement continued until 1971, when two new lines were opened. In Turkey, the Edirne Cut-off was opened to allow trains from Istanbul to Bulgaria to run through Edirne entirely on Turkish territory so that trains such as the Orient Express no longer passed through Ormenio. In Greece, a line was opened to allow trains from Pythio to Bulgaria to stay on Greek territory and avoid Edirne. In 1954 the CFFH was absorbed by the Hellenic State Railways. In 1971, the Hellenic State Railways was reorganised into the OSE taking over responsibilities for most of Greece's rail infrastructure. In the 1990s, OSE introduced the InterCity service to the Alexandroupoli–Svilengrad line Which reduced travel times across the whole line.

In 2009, with the Greek debt crisis unfolding OSE's Management was forced to reduce services across the network. Timetables were cut back, and routes closed as the government-run entity attempted to reduce overheads. Services from Feres to Alexandroupoli were cut back to three trains a day, reducing the reliability of services and passenger numbers. With passenger footfall in sharp decline. On 11 February 2011, all cross-border routes were closed, and international services (to Istanbul, Sofia, etc.) were ended. Thus, only two routes now connect Feres with Thessaloniki and Athens (and those with a connection to Alex / Polis), while route time increased as the network was "upgraded". Services to/from Ormenio were replaced by bus. In 2014 TrainOSE replaced services to/from Dikaia with buses

In 2017 OSE's passenger transport sector was privatised as TrainOSE, currently, a wholly owned subsidiary of Ferrovie dello Stato Italiane infrastructure, including stations, remained under the control of OSE. In July 2022, the station began being served by Hellenic Train, the rebranded TrainOSE.

Following the Tempi crash, Hellenic Train announced rail replacement bus's on certain routes across the Greek rail network, starting Wednesday 15 March 2023.

In August 2025, the Greek Ministry of Infrastructure and Transport confirmed the creation of a new body, Greek Railways (Greek: Σιδηρόδρομοι Ελλάδος, romanized: Ellinikí Sidiródromi Monoprósopi) to assume responsibility for rail infrastructure, planning, modernisation projects, and rolling stock across Greece. Previously, these functions were divided among several state-owned entities: OSE, which managed infrastructure; ERGOSÉ, responsible for modernisation projects; and GAIAOSÉ, which owned stations, buildings, and rolling stock. OSE had overseen both infrastructure and operations until its vertical separation in 2005. Rail safety has been identified as a key priority. The merger follows the July approval of a Parliamentary Bill to restructure the national railway system, a direct response to the Tempi accident of February 2023, in which 43 people died after a head-on collision.

== Facilities ==
The station is location at ground level, at the start of a T junction. with off-road parking. The brick-built station building is now disused, as a result there are no platform facilities and the station is unstaffed. Both active platforms are simply a raised platform Surface, with no equipment. Despite the ground level, the station is not wheelchair assessable.

== Services ==
As of 2020, the station is only served by one daily pair of regional trains Alexandroupoli–Ormenio.

As of October 2024 all services are run as a rail-replacement bus service.

The station is also severed by a limited number of regional buses: (as of 2024) Alexandroupoli Port 08:04, Dikaia 16:21 and Alexandroupoli Port 21:06.

== Station layout ==
L Ground/Concourse	Customer service	Tickets/Exits
Level; Ε1
Level; Ε1	Platform 1	Disused
Level; Ε1	Platform 2	In non-regular use
Level; Ε1	Side platform, doors on the right/left
Level; Ε1	Platform 3	to Alexandroupolis (Terminus) ←
Level; Ε1	Island platform, doors open on the right/left
Level; Ε1	Platform 4	to Ormenio (Peplos) →
