= Peplos, Evros =

Peplos Πέπλος
- Community
- Location within Greece
- Coordinates: 40°57′N 26°16′E
- Country: Greece
- Administrative region: East Macedonia and Thrace
- Regional unit: Evros
- Municipality: Alexandroupoli
- Municipal unit: Feres
- Elevation: 53 m (174 ft)

Population (2021)
  - Community: 1,035
- Time zone: UTC+2 (EET)
  - Summer (DST): UTC+3 (EEST)
- Postal code: 680 13
- Vehicle registration: EB

Peplos, as seen from the road

Peplos (Greek: Πέπλος) is a town and a community of Feres municipal unit, Evros regional unit, East Macedonia and Thrace, Greece. Since the 2011 local government reform it is a part of the municipality Alexandroupoli. The town's population is around 1,000 people.

== History ==
The Evros region where Peplos is located is in the historical region of Thrace. It was ruled by various major empires throughout history, including the Roman Empire and then the Byzantine Empire. Along with the rest of the Greek mainland it was conquered by the Ottomans in the 14th and 15th centuries. It remained under Ottoman rule until the Balkan Wars, when it was conquered by Bulgaria in 1913. Following World War I it was ceded to Greece in the Treaty of Neuilly in 1920.

=== Balkan Wars ===
Before the First Balkan War Peplos (then known as Merhamli) was in the Ottoman Adrianople Vilayet. In 1912 the Balkan League including Bulgaria and Greece went to war with the Ottomans, and Bulgaria invaded Ottoman Western Thrace. A battle between Bulgarian and Ottoman forces occurred at Peplos in November 1912, known as the Battle of Merhamli. This battle was a decisive victory for the Bulgarians, who would go on to win the war along with the rest of the Balkan League. The next year Bulgaria went to war against the rest of the Balkan League (and Romania and the Ottomans) in the Second Balkan War. Following the two Balkan Wars Peplos was in Bulgarian hands until the First World War. The settlements was created with the migration of Arvanites from Turkey in 1923. They largely originate from the inhabitants of the villages of Qytezë and Sultanköy.

== Transport ==
Peplos has a railway station of the same name on the Alexandroupolis–Svilengrad railway. The nearest main road is Greek National Road 2 (EO2), which leads to the A2 motorway (Egnatia Odos) in Kipoi, and Greek National Road 51 (EO51) in Ardani.
