= Thymaria, Evros =

Village in Western Thrace, Greece

Coordinates: 40.994°N 26.267°E

Thymaria (Greek: Θυμαριά; Turkish: Köpekli) is a village in Greece, approximately 23 km south of Soufli. It is part of the municipal unit Tychero. It has a population of 361 (1991 census).

== History ==
The village of Thymaria was established in 1921 by Greek refugees from a village on the Turkish side of the river Evros named Çiftlikköy.

== Sources ==
- Thracian electronic treasure(Greek)
