= Filakto =

Type of amulet worn by Eastern Christians

A filakto (Greek: φυλακτό) is an Eastern Christian sacramental that is pinned to one's clothing in order to ward off Satan. Always adorned with a Christian cross, they are usually made by monastics, who fill them with materials considered holy. Filakto can be edged with small beads or made of cloth.

It is typically given to newborns to protect them from evil, and many adults continue to wear it. When worn by babies, the filakto is typically pinned to the clothes at the left shoulder blade. Adults can wear it anywhere, or carry it in a pocket.

== Contents ==
Typical contents for a filakto include:

- matter from objects blessed for altar use:
  - cotton soaked in holy anointing oil
  - shavings of wax from candles burned upon a church's altar
  - rags from a priest's vestments
- parts of plants used in ceremonies:
  - olive branches
  - flower petals from the Holy Friday kouvouklion (that carries the Epitaphios)
  - blessed palms
- soil from a saint's grave

== See also ==
- Cross necklace
- Phylactery
