= Feres, Evros =

Feres Φέρες
- Municipal unit
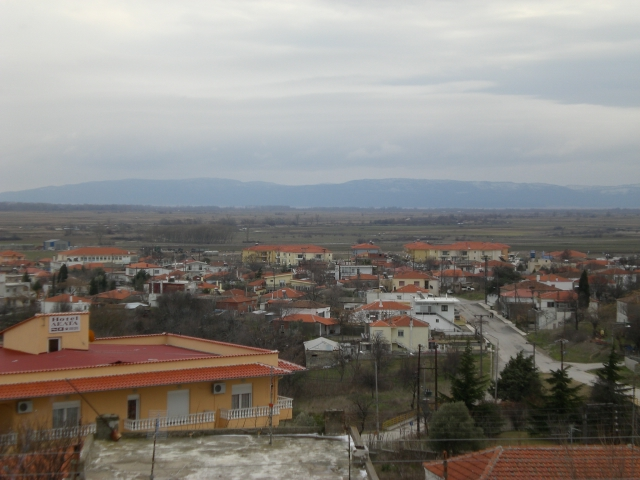
- Feres with Panagia Cosmosotera church

- Location within the regional unit

- Location within Greece
- Coordinates: 40°53′30″N 26°10′15″E
- Country: Greece
- Administrative region: East Macedonia and Thrace
- Regional unit: Evros
- Municipality: Alexandroupoli
- Municipality established: 1986

Area
  - Municipal unit: 411.2 km^{2} (158.8 sq mi)
- Elevation: 43 m (141 ft)

Population (2021)
  - Municipal unit: 6,500
  - Municipal unit density: 16/km^{2} (41/sq mi)
  - Community: 4,228
- Time zone: UTC+2 (EET)
  - Summer (DST): UTC+3 (EEST)
- Postal code: 685 00
- Vehicle registration: EB
- Website: www.feres.gr

Feres (Greek: Φέρες) is a town and a former municipality in the Evros regional unit, East Macedonia and Thrace, Greece. Since the 2011 local government reform it is part of the municipality Alexandroupolis, of which it is a municipal unit. The municipal unit has an area of 411.160 km^{2}. Population 6,500 (2021). Feres is linked with the EO2 road, the A2 motorway towards Thessaloniki and Igoumenitsa, and the EO51 road towards Alexandroupolis and Ormenio. The Evros river forms the border with Turkey to the east.

== History ==
Feres grew out of the Theotokos Kosmosoteira monastery, erected in 1152 by the sebastokrator Isaac Komnenos, a son of the Byzantine emperor Alexios I Komnenos as his residence and final resting place. At the time, the site is described as deserted and densely overgrown, and was known as Bera.

The monastery, which was surrounded by a double set of walls, became the core of a larger settlement. A church dedicated to St. Prokopios was built outside the monastery walls for the local villagers. In the partition of the Byzantine Empire after the Fourth Crusade, the pertinentia de Bira fell to the individual Crusaders' share, and came under the control of Geoffrey of Villehardouin, who sent his nephew Anseau de Courcelles to take over the monastery and his other fiefs in the region.

In 1324, the Bulgarian tsar Michael Shishman invaded Byzantine Thrace and plundered up to the vicinity of Bera, but the local population fled to the fortified settlements. Bera too had by this time become a fortified town and refuge for the local peasants. In 1329/30, the area was raided by Turks. In 1335–1341, the brothers Manuel and John Asanes were held prisoners in the monastery-fortress, and were only released in 1341, when their brother-in-law John VI Kantakouzenos was proclaimed emperor at nearby Didymoteicho, beginning the Byzantine civil war of 1341–1347. Kantakouzenos camped his army in the area in March 1342, but did not attack the fortress because of the presence of the monks, only for it to be seized by an opposing force under John Vatatzes. During the next winter, the fleet of the Aydınid Turks under Umur Bey anchored there, but many of its crews froze to death. John Asanes captured Bera in 1347.

During the Byzantine civil war of 1352–1357, Bera was captured by the forces of John V Palaiologos in 1355. Bera was conquered by the Ottomans under Lala Shahin Pasha in the early 1370s, and by 1433, it is recorded as a town with a mixed Greek and Turkish population. The fortifications had been party destroyed, and the katholikon of the monastery had been converted into a mosque.

The area was taken by Bulgaria in 1913 following Balkan Wars of 1912 and 1913. In 1920, as a result of the Treaty of Neuilly and subsequent agreements, the town was given to Greece. The settlements was created with the migration of Arvanites from Turkey in 1923. They largely originate from the inhabitants of the villages of Qytezë and Sultanköy.

The municipality was created in 1986 and included the settlements of Ardanio, Doriskos, Feres, Kavisos, Monastiraki and Poros. Under the Capodistrian Plan (2539/1997) in 1997, the old communities of Peplos, Pylaia and Tryfilli joined the municipality.

== Transport ==
The settlement is served by a railway station on the Alexandroupoli–Svilengrad line.

== Subdivisions ==
The municipal unit Feres is subdivided into the following communities (constituent villages in brackets):

- Ardanio
- Doriskos (Doriskos, Monastiraki)
- Feres (Feres, Poros)
- Kavisos
- Peplos (Peplos, Vrysoula, Gemisti, Kipoi)
- Pylaia (Pylaia, Koila, Melia)
- Tryfilli (Tryfilli, Itea)

== Population ==
Year	Community population	Municipal unit population
1981	5,309	-
1991	4,657	-
2001	5,422	9,627
2011	5,659	8,551
2021	4,228	6,500

== Notable people ==
- Lefteris Hapsiadis (b. 1953), lyrical person
- Giorgos Valavanidis ( b. 1974), basketball player

== Gallery ==
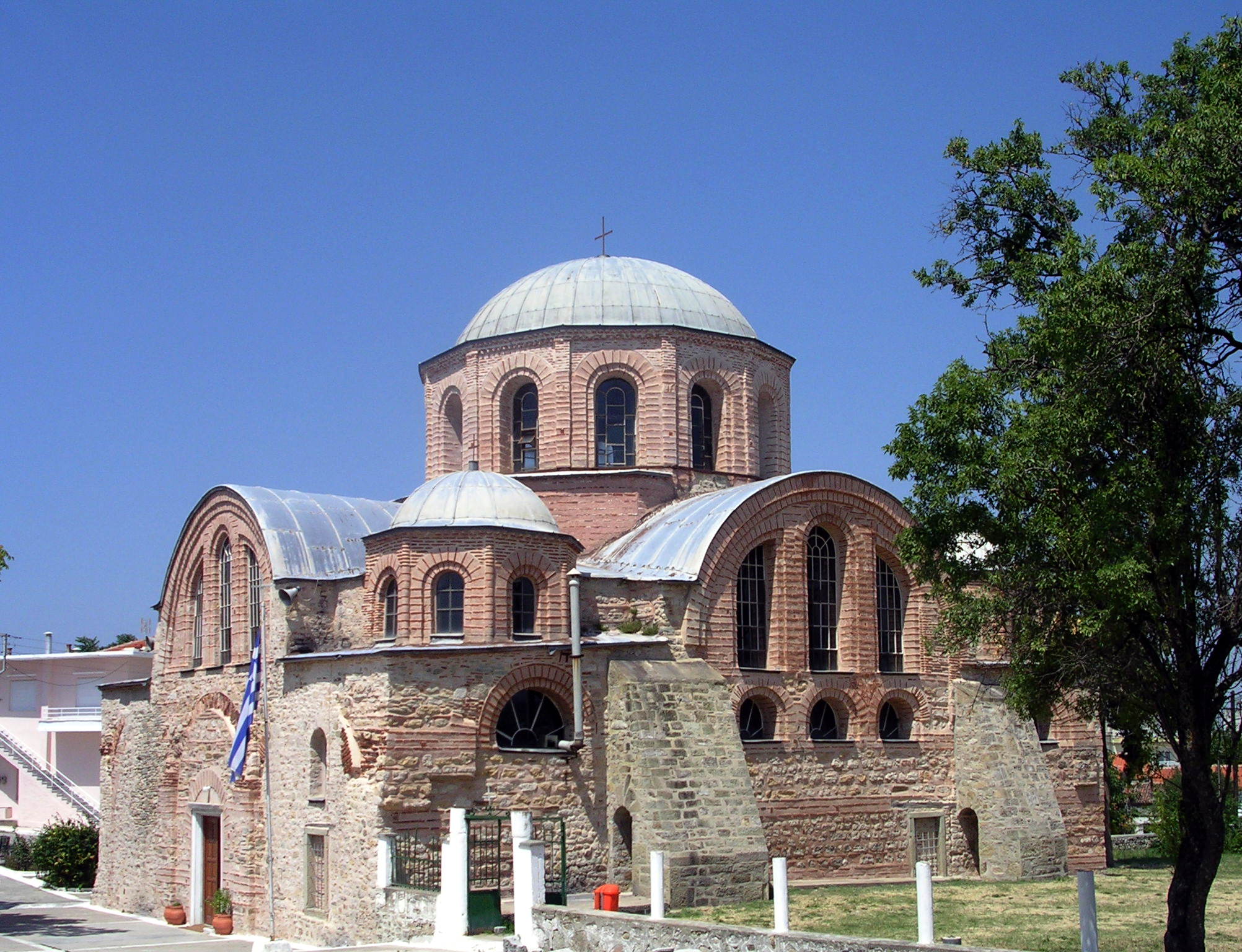
Church of the Monastery of Theotokos Kosmosoteira

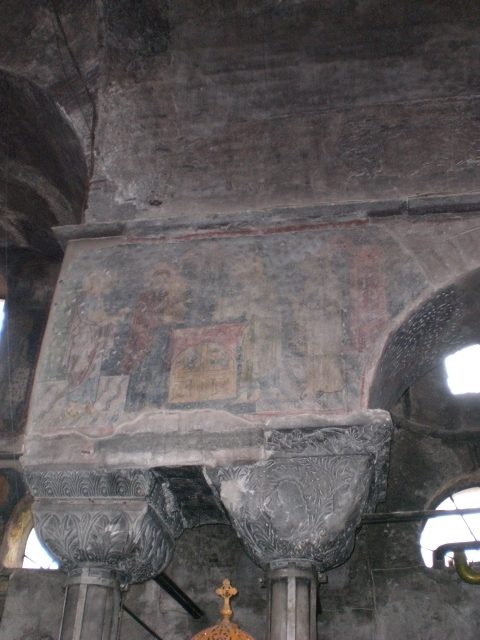
Surviving art in the church

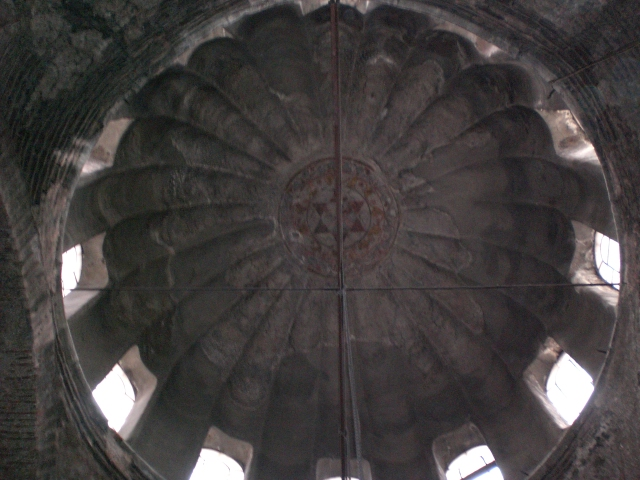
Interior of the church dome

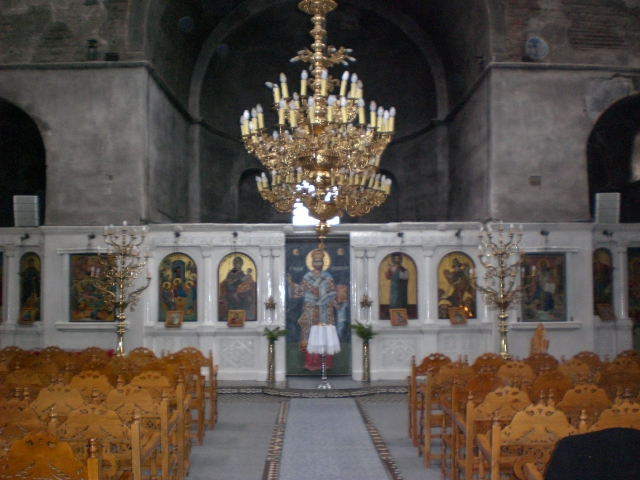
Church interior

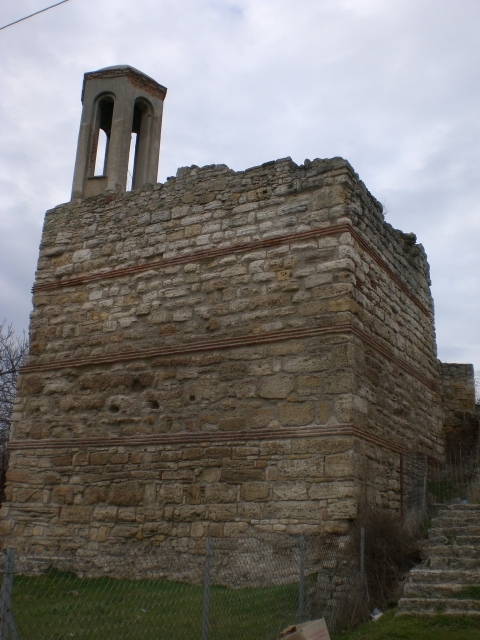
Tower near the church

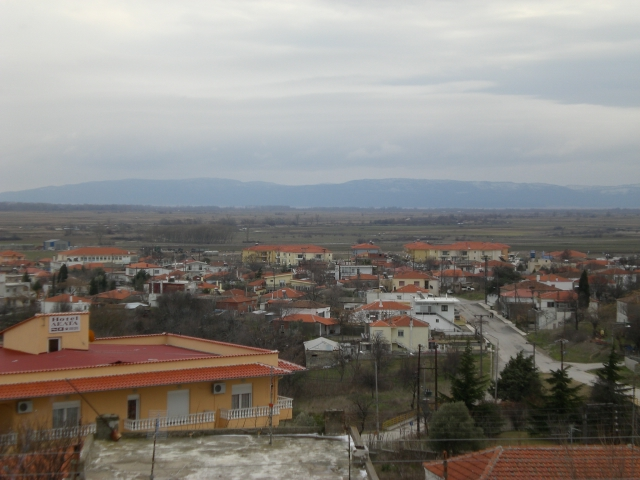
View over Feres from the tower

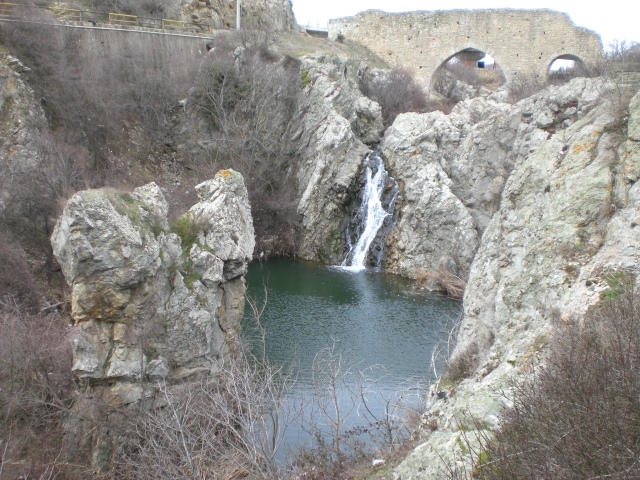
Waterfall and pool

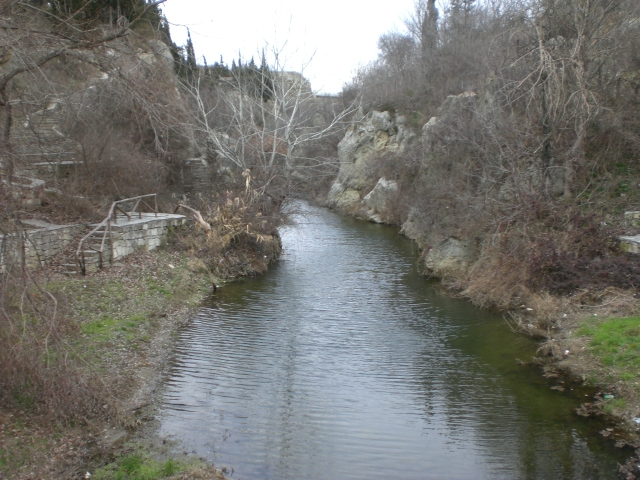
River leading from the waterfall

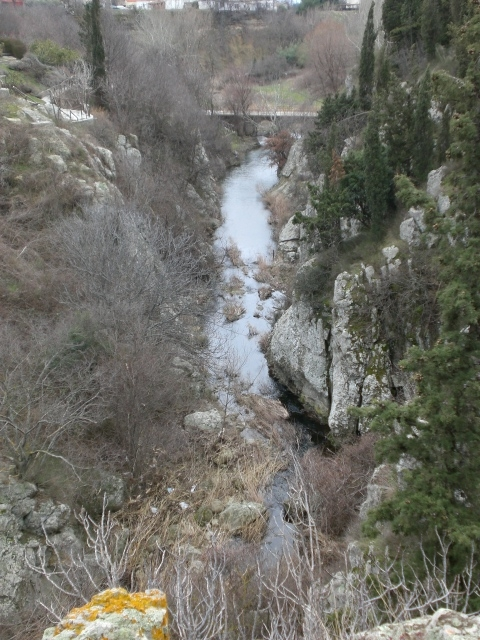
Waterfall close to centre of Feres

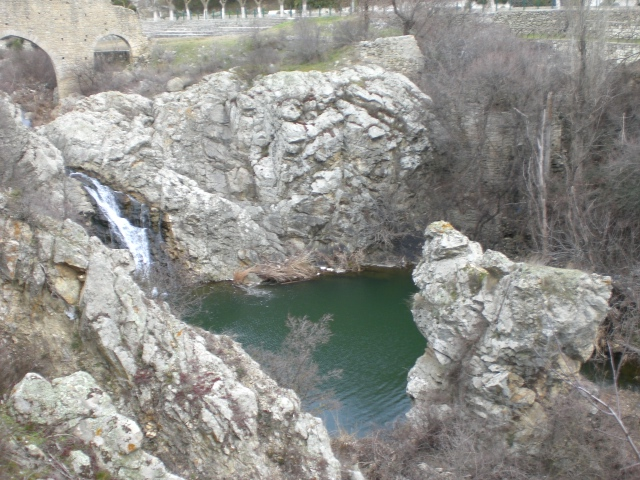
View of waterfall and pool

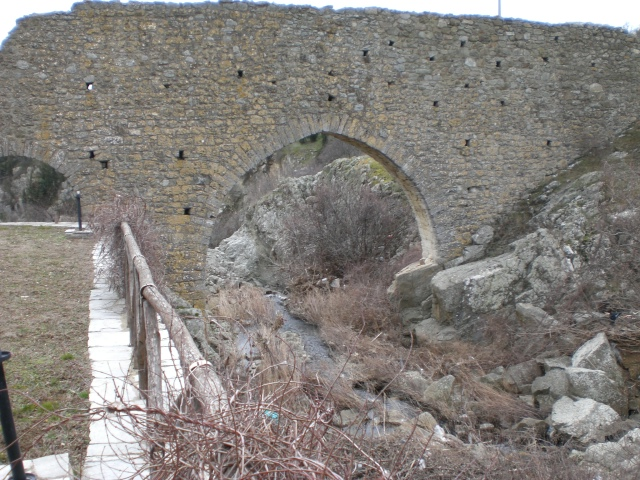
Old bridge close to the waterfall
